= Wasserhaus (Münchenstein) =

Building in Switzerland

Coordinates: 47°31′35″N 7°37′14″E

The residential estate Wasserhaus is in the sub-district Neue Welt, Münchenstein, Basel-Country near Basel (Switzerland)

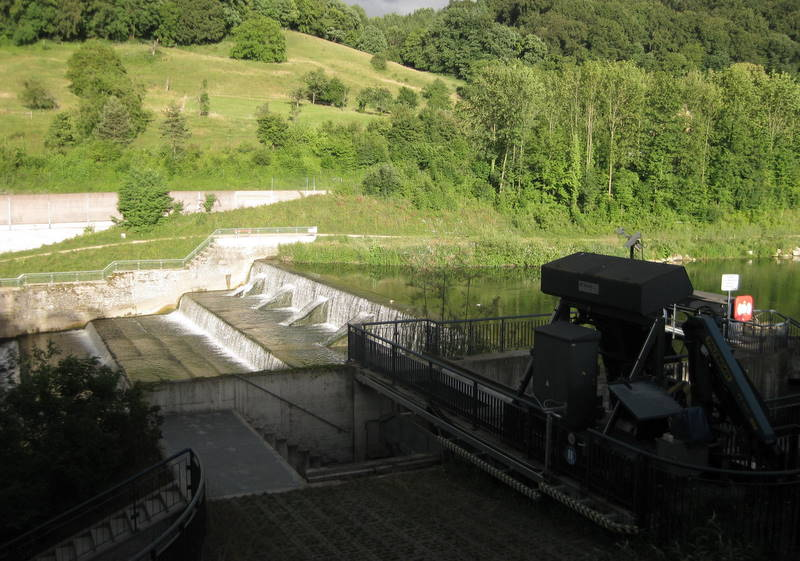
Birs waterfall and power station

The German word "Siedlung" means settlement (housing development or residential area).

== Geographical location ==
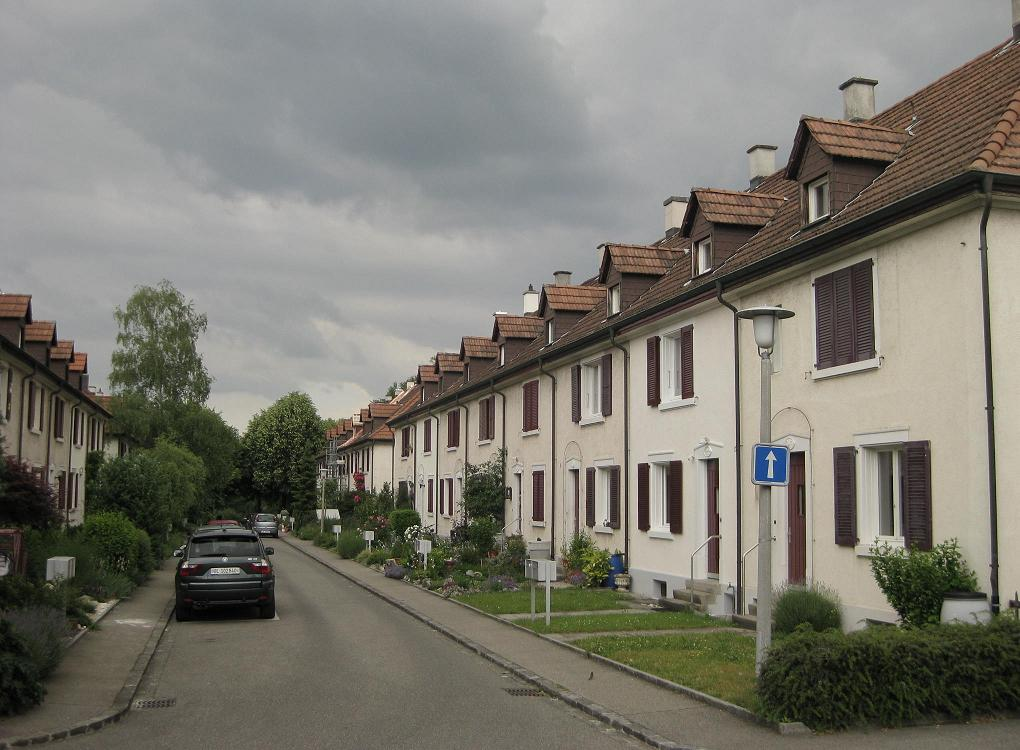
Wasserhaus residential estate

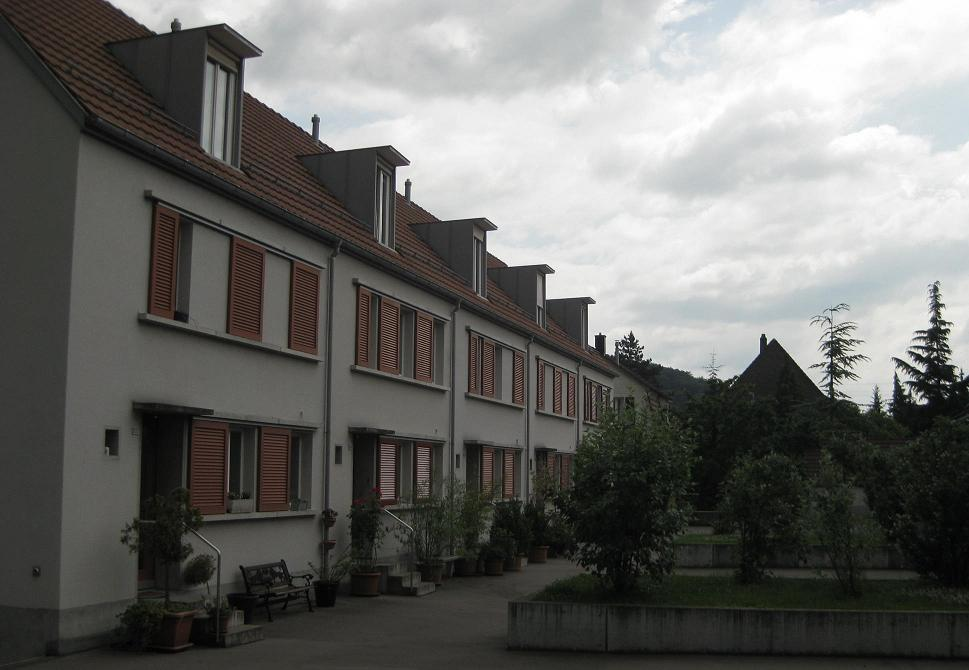
Wasserhaus, the extension

The environmental area called the Neue Welt (new world) evolved in the 17th century as the industry started to establish itself around the upper end of the "St. Alban-Teich". This is an artificially constructed canal built during the 12th century to bring water (water power) to the industry in Basel.

Later, during 1624–25, the canal was prolonged through Brüglingen towards the Birs waterfall in Münchenstein. From here the water is diverged to the canal. Here there is a small power station that has been built onto the waterfall.

The residential estate Wasserhaus lies on the left bank of the river Birs, between the industrial area of the Neue Welt and the waterfall.

== History ==
Up until the end of the First World War, the building of residential areas was confined to areas within the Basel city boundaries. Soon after the First World War, however, the suburban areas started being inhabited and expanded. It was during this period that large residential building blocks were erected in Basel's peripheries. These quarters were renowned for their high quality standards of residence, but also for their modest social attraction.

On the other hand, experiments were made with generously arranged cooperative settlements, primarily terraced houses with individual gardens. The communal housing estate "Freidorf" in Muttenz and "Wasserhaus" in Münchenstein are two prime examples of this evolution. These estates were developed to enhance the social charm in the rural community.

The "Wasserhaus" residential area was built during 1920–21. The estate originated thanks to financial investments from the regional industry. In the beginning the industries themselves administrated the cooperative in the function of housing for their workers. Later the small residential cooperative progressed as an alternative to the public pension schemes. During the 1980s the private pension schemes expanded, and the small cooperative was continually losing its financial advantages. Subsequently the houses were placed on the market and the cooperative folded.

== Architecture ==
The estate was developed by the architect Wilhelm Eduard Brodtbeck (1873–1957) from Liestal (canton Baselland), concluding the plans drawn by Prof. Hans Benno Bernoulli (1876–1959).

Not only the funds and organisation originated from an innovative idea. The architecture was also revolutionary. Built on a vast unrestricted zone, far away from the town boundaries, the original project was foreseen for 100 residential terraced houses. These houses arranged uniformly distributed along two parallel streets in a north–south axis. Each house with a small garden to the street and a spacious rear garden. It was also foreseen to have a, focal and social, centrally situated congregational building as main component.

However, due to financial problems, only a part of the original plans (60 houses) were completed and this without the important central connecting elements. Nevertheless, because of the unique archetype nature and the prototypical neighbourhood, the Wasserhaus estate was taken up in the inventory of the valuable and worthy of protection place of interest. Inventar der schützenswerten Ortsbilder (ISOS)

The original project had also foreseen a large gardening area. These garden plots were later used as building space. An extension was built onto the estate during 1995–98.
