= Neue Welt =

- Municipality
- Location of Neue Welt
- Location within Switzerland Location within Canton of Basel-Land
- Coordinates: 47°31′23″N 7°37′02″E
- Country: Switzerland
- Canton: Basel-Land
- District: Münchenstein
- Time zone: UTC+01:00 (CET)
  - Summer (DST): UTC+02:00 (CEST)
- ISO 3166 code: CH-BL
- Website: website missing

The Neue Welt is a sub-district of Münchenstein, in the canton of Basel-Country in Switzerland.

== Geographical location ==
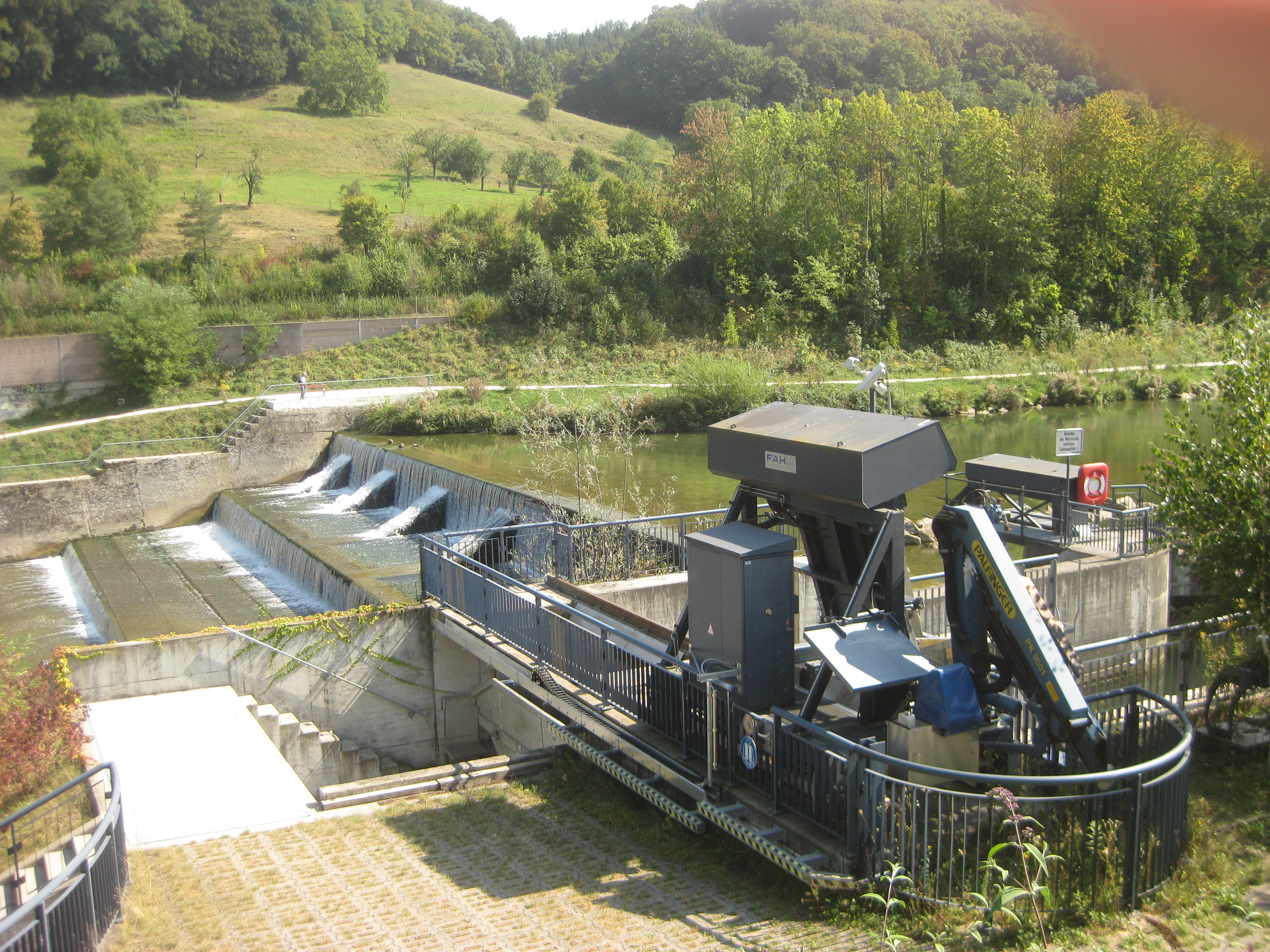
Birs Waterfall and the small power station

The geographical area called the Neue Welt (new world) evolved in the 17th century as the industry started establishing itself around the upper end of the "St. Alban-Teich". This is a canal, artificially constructed by the Basler Kloster St. Alban during the 12th century, so as to bring water and water power to the industry in Basel. Later, during the years 1624–25, the canal was extended through Brüglingen towards the Birs waterfall in Münchenstein and from here the water is diverged.

The Neue Welt is the northernmost district of Münchenstein and lies along the western bank of the River Birs. To its east, it borders on the municipality of Muttenz and to the west, it borders on Dreispitz, a business and economic service neighbourhood that lies half in Basel and half in Münchenstein. To the north, Neue Welt borders St. Jakob an der Birs (now part of Basel); this was the site of the famous Battle of St. Jakob an der Birs, on 26 August 1444.

== History and places of interest ==
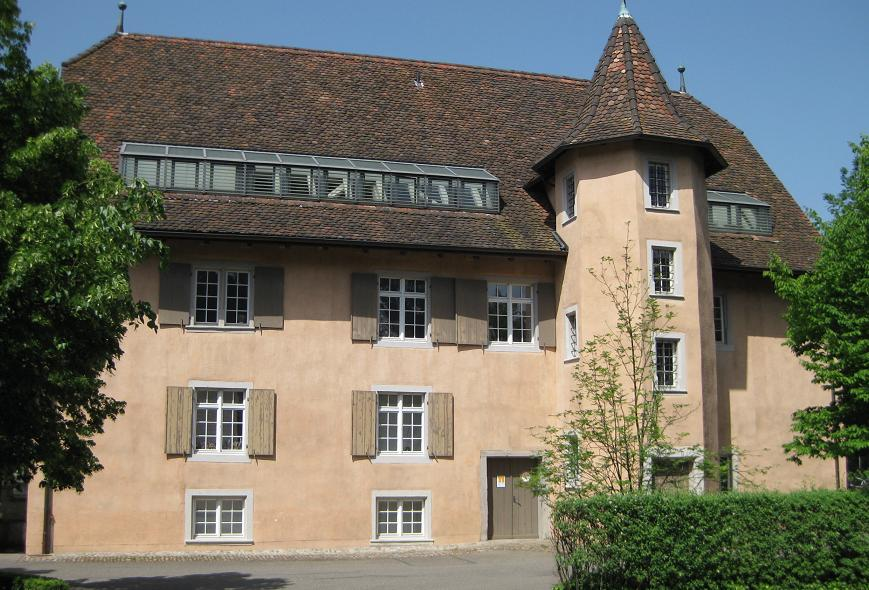
The hammer mill (Hammerschmiede), Neue Welt, refurbished in 1970

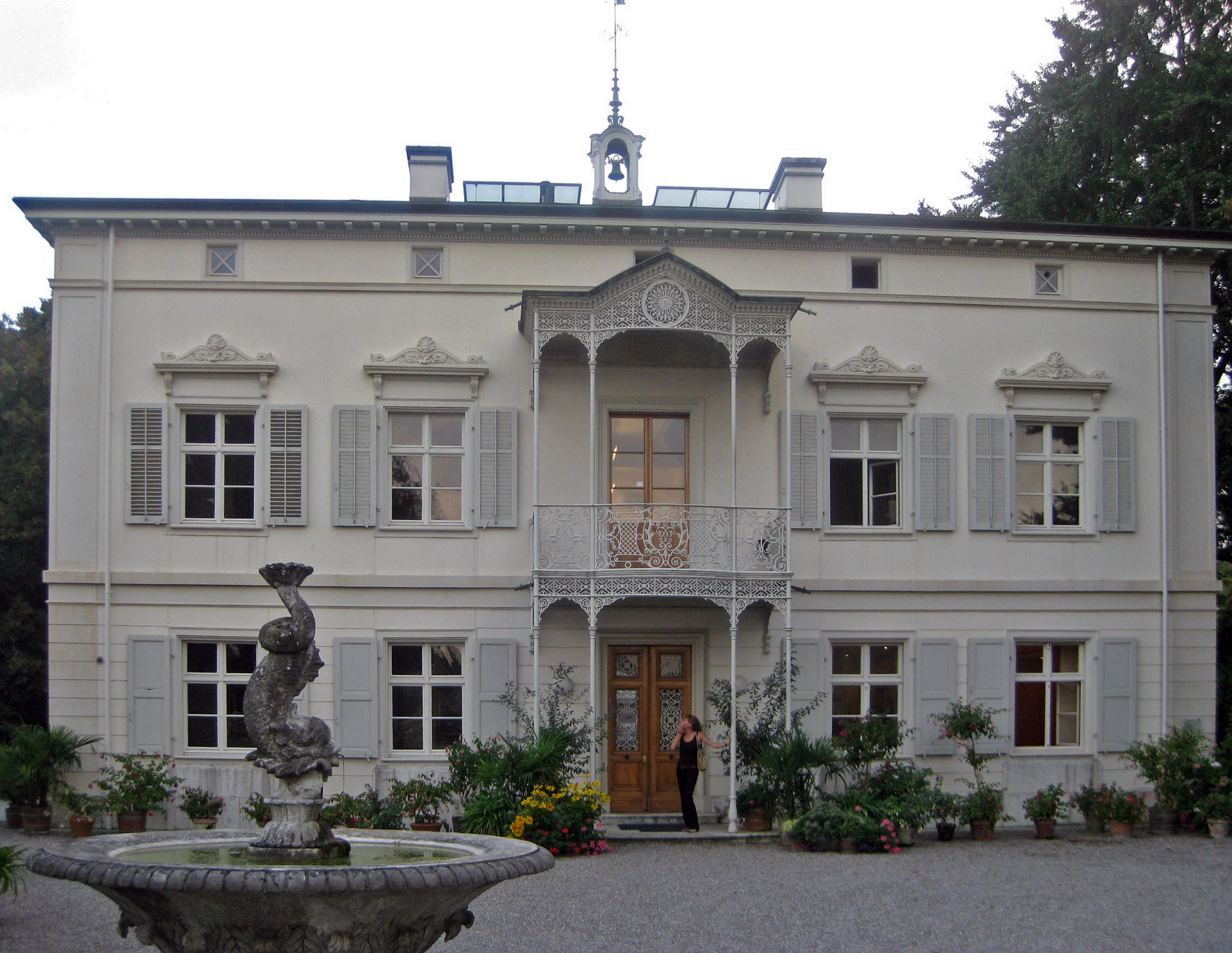
Villa Merian, Münchenstein, main entrance

The hammer mill (Hammerschmiede), built in 1660 by Ludwig Krug, is the oldest building situated on the banks of the canal. In 1822, the hammer mill was refurbished as a cotton-spinning mill by Felix Sarasin (1771–1839). The hammer mill was restored and completely refurbished in 1970 by the Christof Merian Foundation, known by its German aconym CMS, and was placed under monument conservation a year later.

The Villa Merian, with its English Garden, stands upon the elevated plain directly above the watermill and the canal. The Baroque manor house was built in 1711 by Alexander Löffler. In 1801 the manor was rebuilt in early Classicism style and approximately ten years later the manor and its properties were acquired by Christoph Merian-Hoffmann who gave the estate to his son Christoph Merian as wedding present. The Villa Merian is now a coffee house.

A late Gothic mill is situated directly below the Villa Merian. The mill is first mentioned in a deed dated 1259. The operation of the mill continued until 1925. Since 1966 the watermill building is now being used as the Watermill Museum Brüglingen.

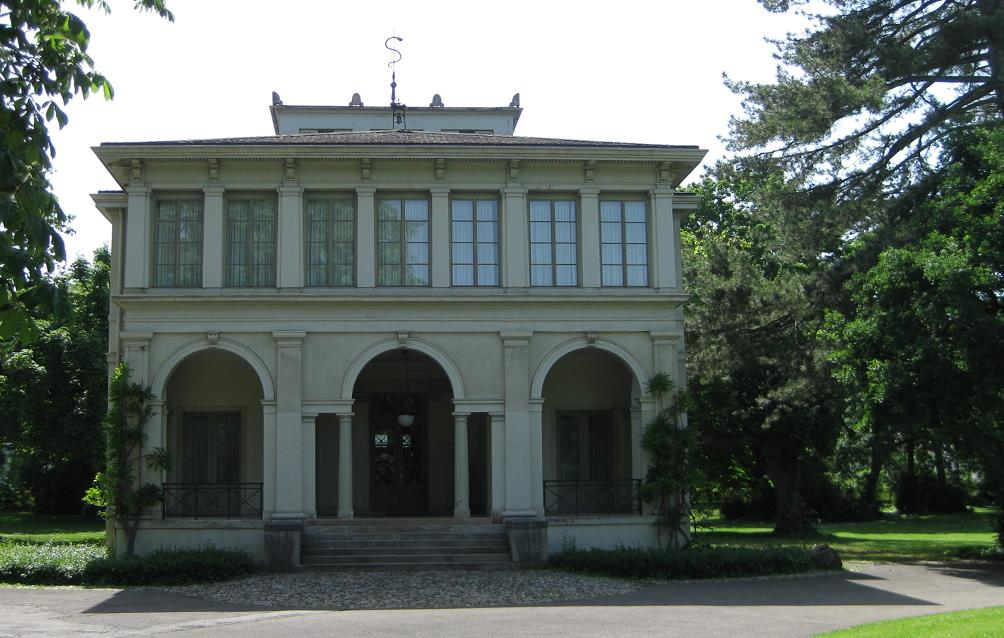
Villa Ehinger (now the Music School), the front side and the main entrance

Felix Sarasin's son Ludwig August Sarasin built his residence Villa Ehinger nearby. Ludwig Sarasin died in 1831; one of his daughters married into the Ehinger family, and that is how the villa acquired its name. The family Ehinger sold the estate and the villa in 1959 to the municipality (Gemeinde) Münchenstein. The municipality later passed the estate onto the canton Basel-Country. In 1973 the Villa Ehinger was refurbished as a music school and the canton built additional schools upon the estate grounds. The Kindergarten "Ehinger", the Primary School "Neue Welt" and Münchenstein grammar school stand on this development together with the "TSM-School Centrum for impeded children". The Kindergarten "Teichweg" is located in the residential area near the canal and the Kindergarten "Neue Welt" is to be found by the entrance to Brüglingen.

At the beginning of the 20th century, the fast-expanding company André Klein, who specialise in the production of "Basler Läckerli", relocated their bakery into the former cotton-spinning mill "Sarasin & Heusler".

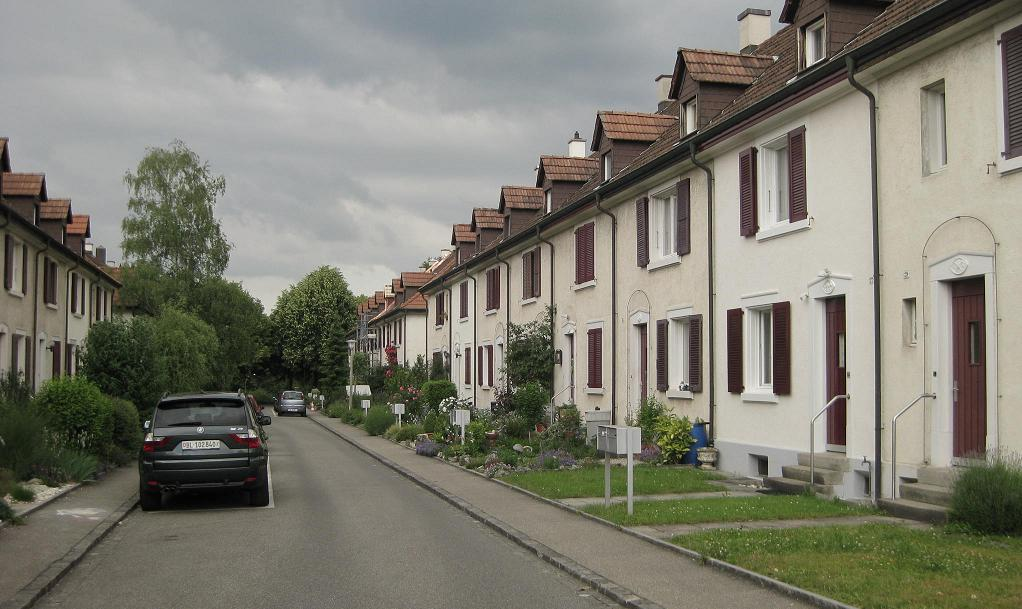
Wasserhaus residential estate

The Wasserhaus residential estate was built during the years 1920–21. The estate was developed by the architect Wilhelm Eduard Brodtbeck from Liestal (canton Basel-Country, Switzerland), concluding the original plans drawn by Prof. Hans Benno Bernoulli, Basel (1876–1959). Due to the unique archetype nature and the prototypical neighbourhood, the Wasserhaus estate was taken up in the Swiss Inventory of Cultural Property of National and Regional Significance. Inventar der schützenswerten Ortsbilder (ISOS).

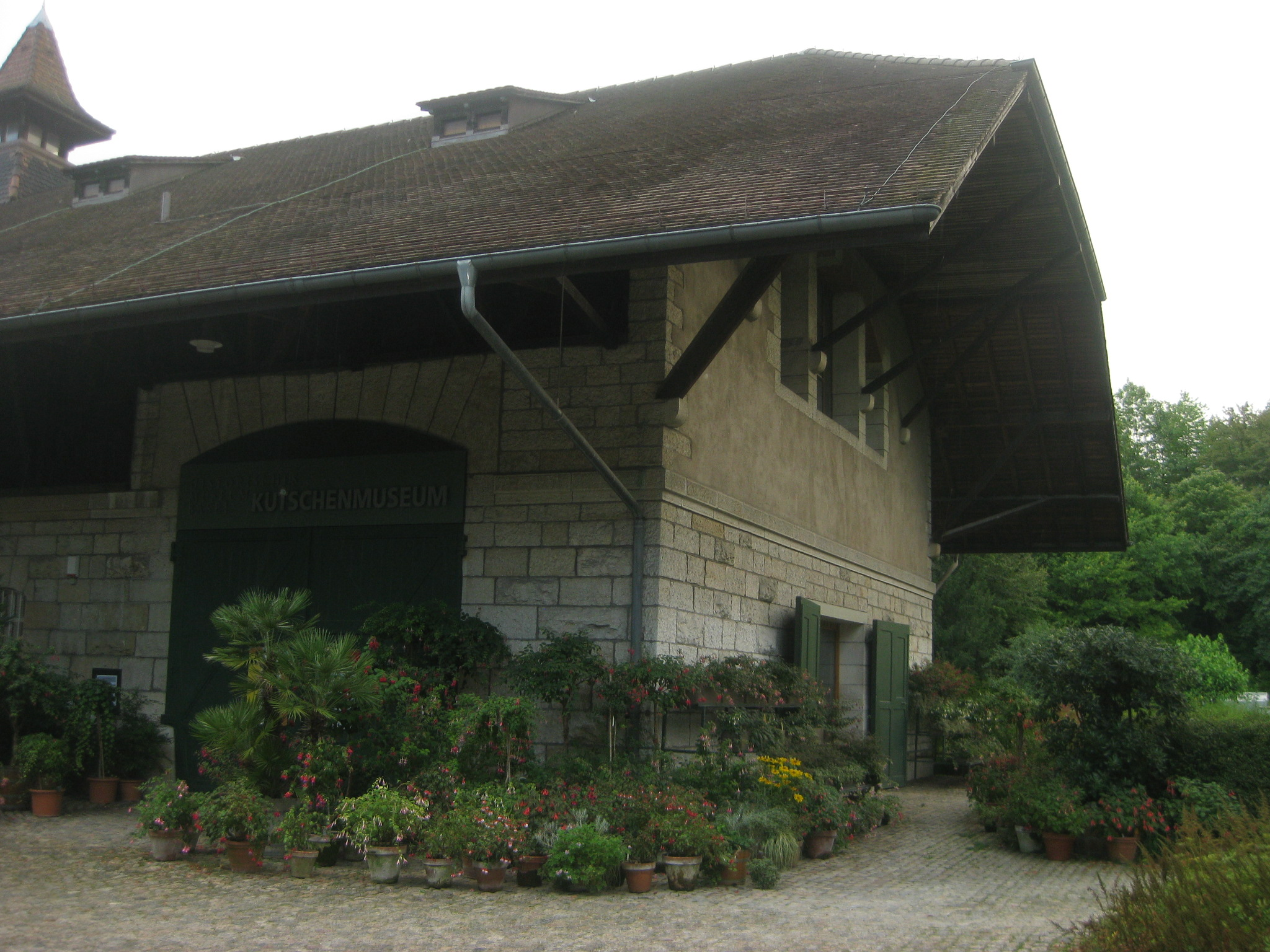
The Coach and Carriage Museum, Brüglingen

In 1980 Münchenstein was the host municipality (Gemeinde) of the 2nd Swiss Exhibition for Garden and Landscaping Grün 80. The exhibition was held on the grounds of the Merian Park in Brüglingen which belongs to the Christoph Merian Stiftung. About 3.5 million visitors came to the exhibition. The area is now officially called Park im Grünen but the local designation Grün 80 has prevailed. The name of the tram and bus stop (10 line (BLT) and busses no. 60/63) has meanwhile been changed from "Neuewelt" to "Neuewelt / Grün 80". The park is open all year round, 24 hours a day, and houses the Coach and Carriage Museum, section of the Basel Historical Museum. The museum can be found in a barn on the elevated plain above Brüglingen.
