= Melchior Berri =

Swiss architect

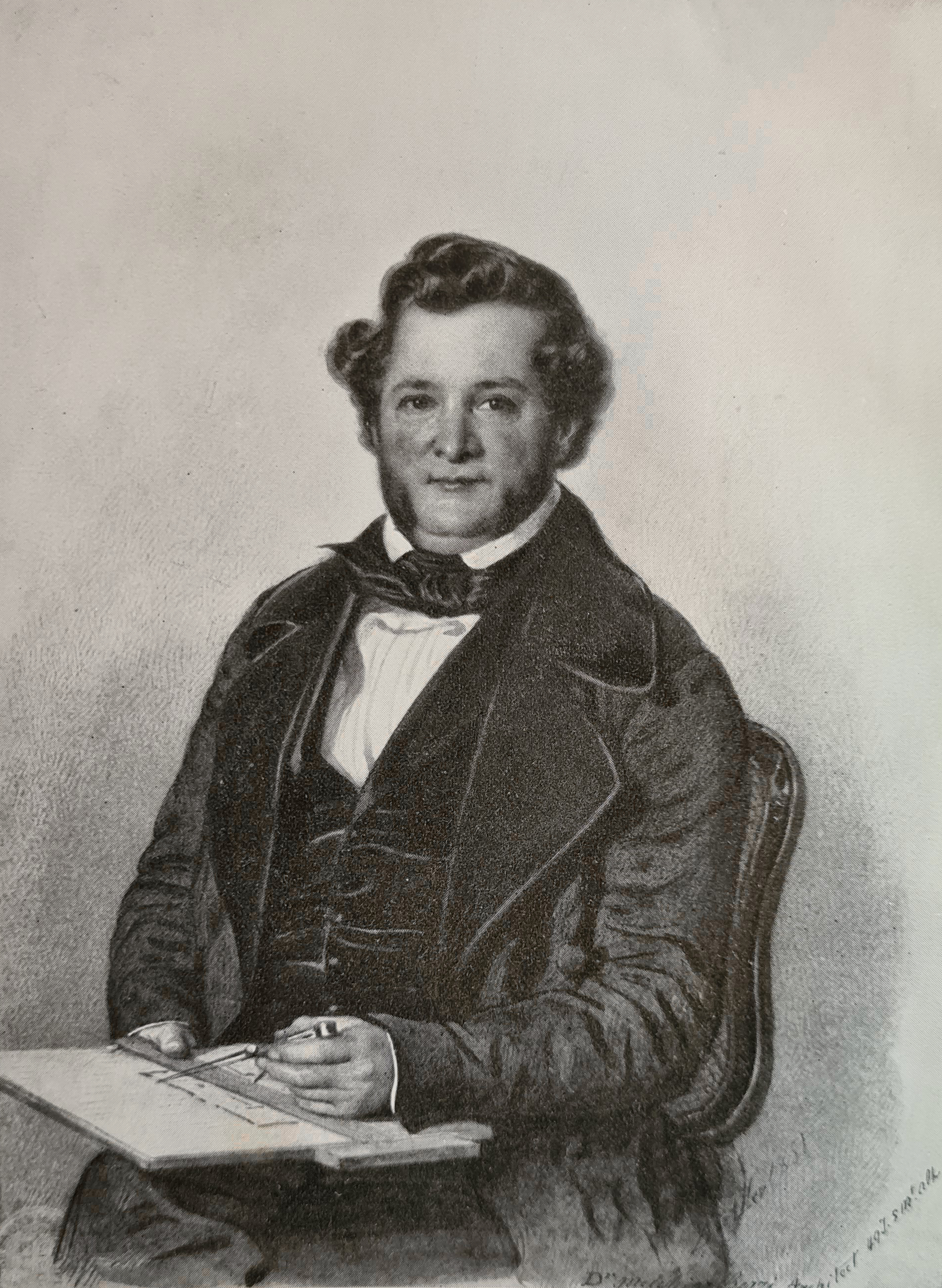
- Portrait of Melchior Berri, by Johann Friedrich Dietler
- Born: 20 October 1801; Basel, Switzerland
- Died: 12 May 1854 (aged 52); Basel, Switzerland

Melchior Berri (20 October 1801 – 12 May 1854) was a Swiss architect.

He was the son of Melchior Berri (parish priest in Münchenstein) and Appollonia Streckeisen. In 1832 he married Margaretha Simone Burckhardt of Basel.

== Biography ==
=== Early life ===
Berri was born on 20 October 1801 in Basel. He grew up as the son of a pastor in Basel and Münchenstein. In his youth he wanted to become a Military engineer for Napoleon. His father had thought for him a career as a stonemason but after the advice of a relative, his family supported his education as an architect. Between 1817 and 1819 he studied in Karlsruhe with Johann Jakob Arnold the nephew of the famous architect Friedrich Weinbrenner. From 1819, he was able to study with Weinbrenner. Afterwards he studied with the architect Jean-Nicolas Huyot in Paris at the Ecole des Beaux Arts between 1823 and 1825. In August 1825, he won a competition which allowed him to continue his studies at the Académie des Beaux-Arts. During his studies in Paris he rented a room. He sometimes visited the cemetery Père Lachaise where he made sketches of the monuments and also attended the coronation of Charles X.

In 1826, he travelled to Italy, where he took an interest, both in Pompeii's buildings and frescos, and in the Renaissance palaces of Rome. In doing so, he developed the technical skills of a stonemason, plasterer, and bricklayer. He also practised drawing landscapes and figures, and studied subjects of technical construction.

=== Career ===
In 1828, Melchior Berri opened a construction business and a school of construction and drawing in Basel. His impact outside of the Basel region is mostly due to the construction of the Basel Museum, his only remaining monumental building, but is also due to his designs for city halls in Zurich and in Bern, as well as his plans for housing development for Lucerne and Basel.

Berri was also a member of Basel-Stadt's Grand Council and its construction commission, and in 1841, he became president of the Verein Schweizerischer Ingenieure und Architekten (SIA; Association of Swiss Engineers and Architects). He obtained international fame as a neo-classical architect and became honorary doctor of two British architectural associations.

Between the stress he was under as both a builder and an artist, but possibly also due to the constraints of his provincial circumstances, Berri became depressed and killed himself in 1854.

== Legacy ==
=== Buildings ===
- Villa Ehinger, Münchenstein – 1829–1832
- Altes Gemeindehaus in Riehen – 1834–1835
- Museum for Natural History and Ethnography, Basel – 1842–1849
- Former Sarasin binding factory (Youth Hostel), Basel – 1850–1851
- Several buildings in the botanical garden in Brügglingen, including the orangery, barn and tenant's house – 1837–1839

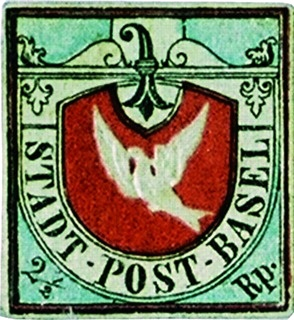
The stamp "Basel Dove"

=== Miscellaneous ===
- Tombs
- First multicolour stamp, Basler Dybli – 1845
- Postboxes (Basler Dybli)
- Fountains (including the Dreizackbrunnen, Basel – 1837)

=== Demolished buildings ===
- City Casino, Basel – 1821–1824; torn down 1949
- Blömlein Theatre, Basel – 1829; torn down 1969
- Railway Gate in the Basel City Wall – 1844; torn down 1880
