= Villa Ehinger (Münchenstein) =

Villa in Switzerland

Coordinates: 47°31′39″N 7°37′00″E

The Villa Ehinger is a building in the Neue Welt, a sub-district of Münchenstein, in the canton of Basel-Country in Switzerland. The villa was designed by Melchior Berri as a commission for Ludwig August Sarasin.

== Geographical location ==
The geographical area called the Neue Welt (new world) evolved as the industry started establishing itself around the upper end of the "St. Alban-Teich". This is a canal, artificially constructed by the Basler Kloster St. Alban during the 12th century, so as to bring water and water power to the industry in Basel. Later, during the years 1624–25, the canal was prolonged through Brüglingen towards the Birs waterfall in Münchenstein and from here the water is diverged.

== History ==
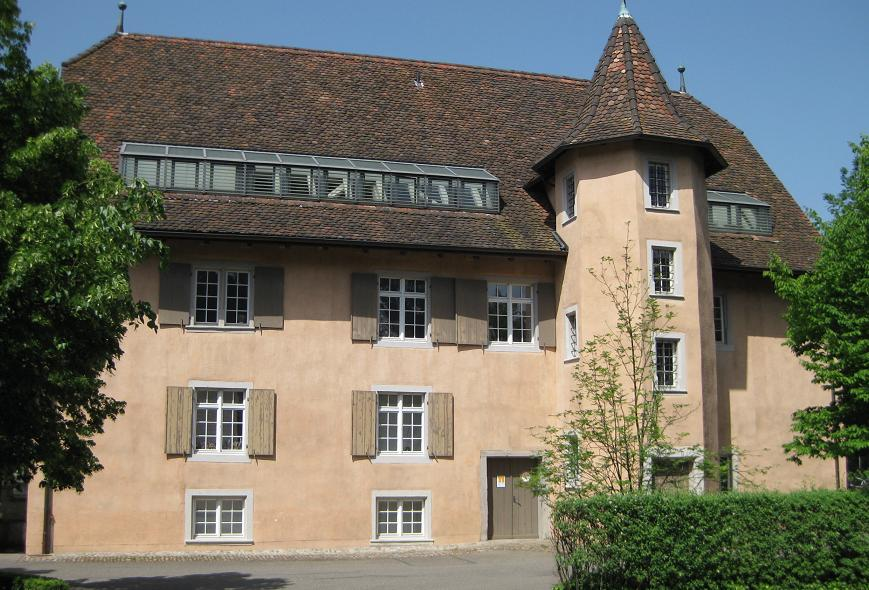
Hammerschmiede, Neue Welt, Münchenstein, refurbished in 1970

The Villa Ehinger is situated in the middle of a Park, above the industry. The neo-classical summer residence became renowned under the name of the ultimate owners. The Villa was originally built in association with the previous hammer mill (Hammerschmiede).

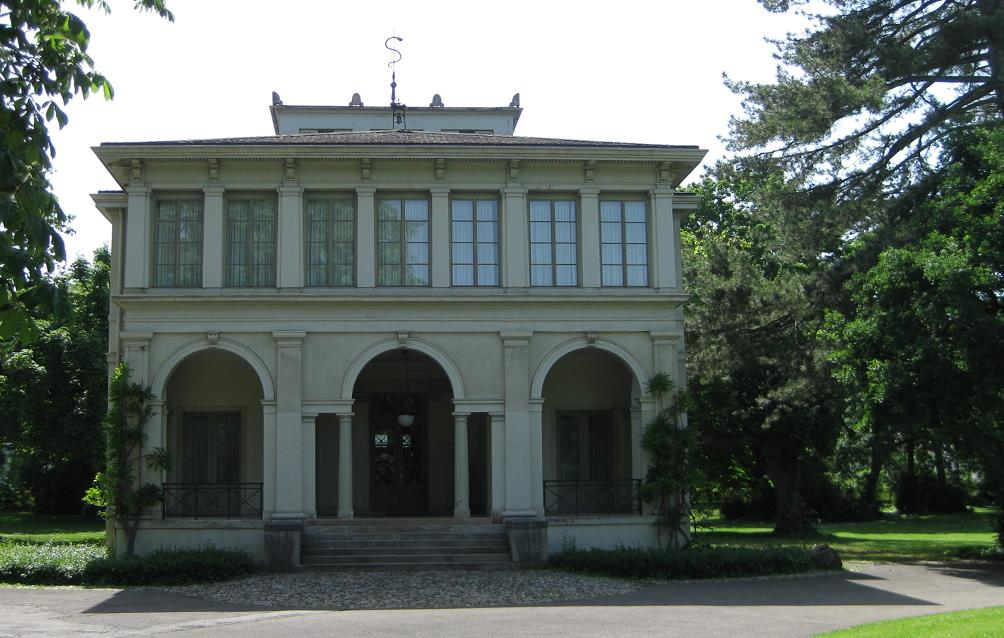
Villa Ehinger, refurbished in 1973

The hammer mill from 1660 is the oldest building situated on the banks of the canal. It was built by Ludwig Krug. In 1822 the hammer mill was refurbished as a cotton-spinning mill by Felix Sarasin (1771–1839). The technical administration was taken on by his son Ludwig August Sarasin (1804–31), who sought for his new residence to be built nearby.

Sarasin's acquaintance with the young architect Melchior Berri led him to commission Berri with the planning and construction of this country house in 1829. Up until then Berri's work had been confined by the existing frontages of the town streets (Basel Casino and other buildings within the town). Here, however, he was free to build a house that was unconfined by other buildings or existing boundaries, a building that should have an English garden surrounding it. Unfortunately Ludwig August Sarasin died in 1831, before the conclusion of the building, in 1932. One of the Sarasin daughters married into the Ehinger Family and that is how the villa came to its name.

== Modern History ==
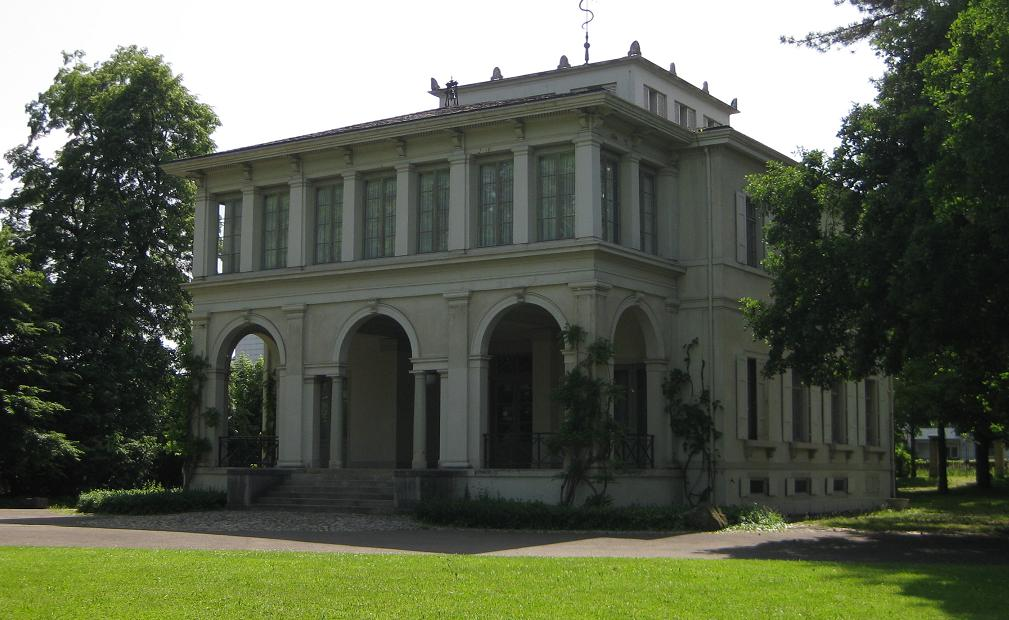
Villa Ehinger

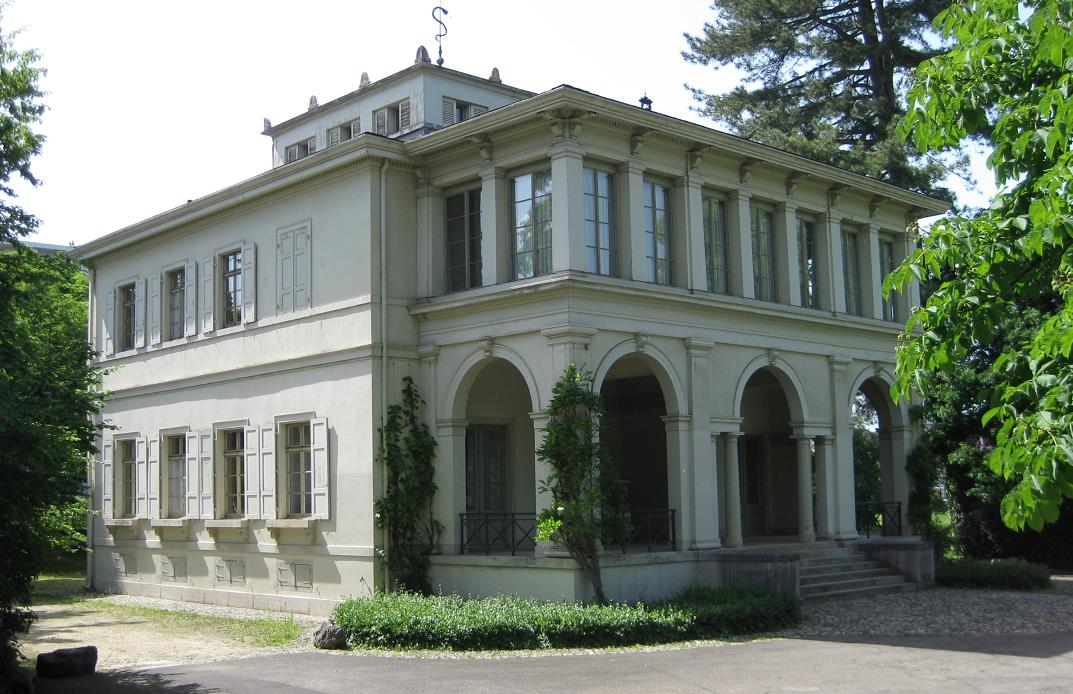
Villa Ehinger

The family Ehinger sold the entire estate including the villa and its grounds to the municipality (Gemeinde) Münchenstein in 1959.

The municipality then passed the estate onto the canton Baselland in 1962. The canton built a grammar (secondary) school on the estate grounds in 1972.

In 1973 the villa was completely restored and refurbished as a music school.

During the refurbishment, significant cultural consideration were paid to the initial Architecture. Special attention was given to ensure that each separate room was given a new function, without changing its individuality within the historical building.

== Architecture ==
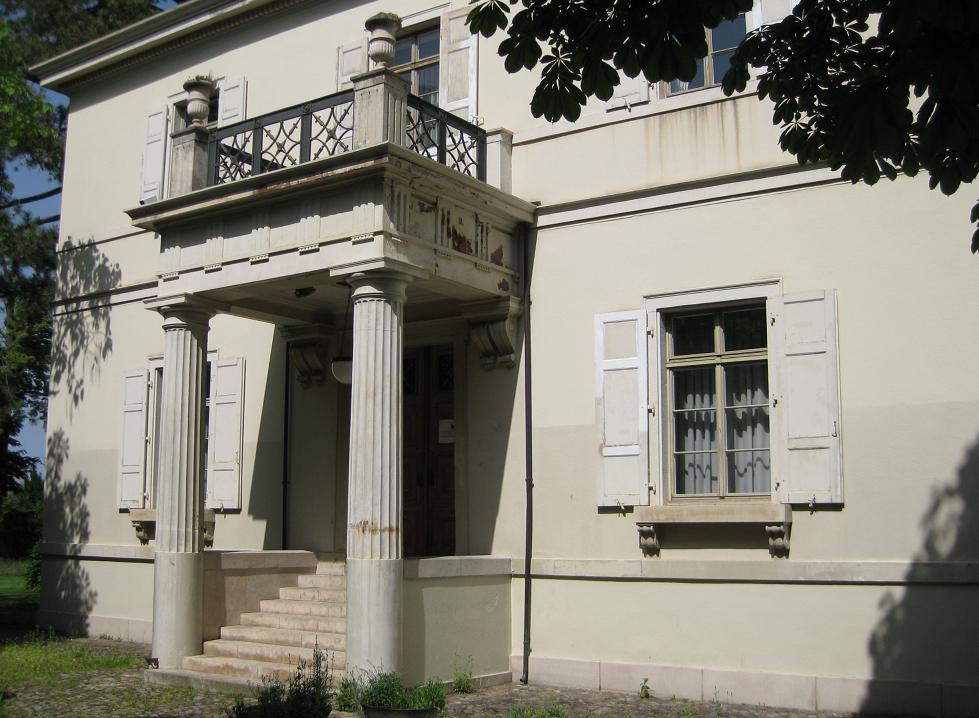
Villa Ehinger. The Portico with Balcony und the Main Entrance

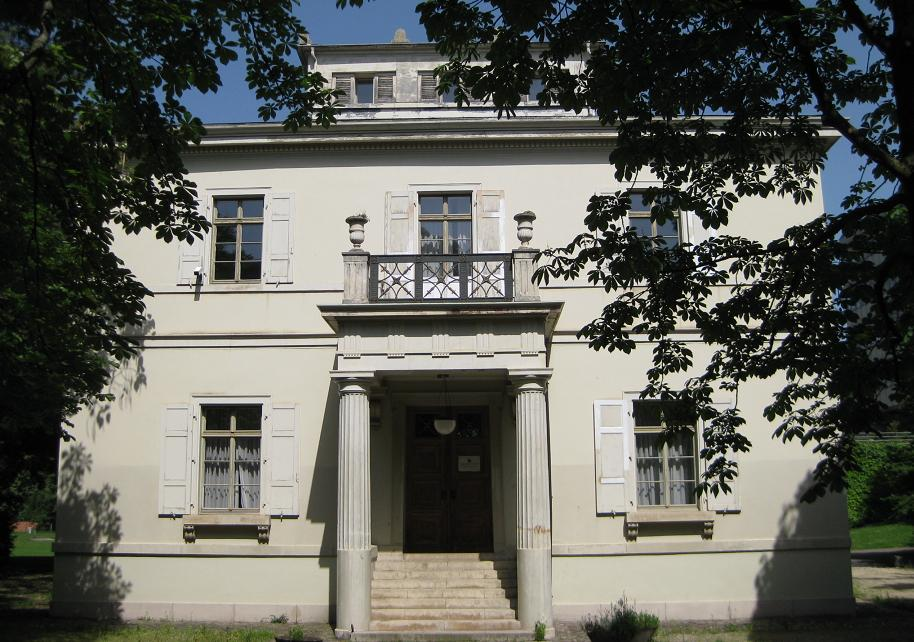
Villa Ehinger, Main Entrance

The villa has a virtually quadratic ground plan. It is a two-storey building. On the western side of the house there is a Portico as entrance. Two Doric columns carry an entablature and the balcony.

Built onto the eastern side of the villa (facing towards the park) there is also a two-storey Loggia, but this is somewhat narrower. The semicircular arched foyer is one of the most significant features of this villa. This foyer/vestibule can be assigned to the themes of Sebastiano Serlio (1475–1554) and Andrea Palladio (1508–1580). In the middle of the pyramidal broach roof is the Palmette (also called anthemion) window storey. The crown is concluded with a roof pinnacle, a rod of Asclepius, to emphasize the apex of the gable. There is a fountain on the southern side of the house that is typical for the epoch.

In the interior, the sections are aligned to the east-west axis. The rooms are grouped around the central Foyer. Not only Berri's stucco ceilings, but also the neo-classical white stove on the first floor and the original drawings of the Portico remain conserved.
