= Münchenstein =

- Municipality
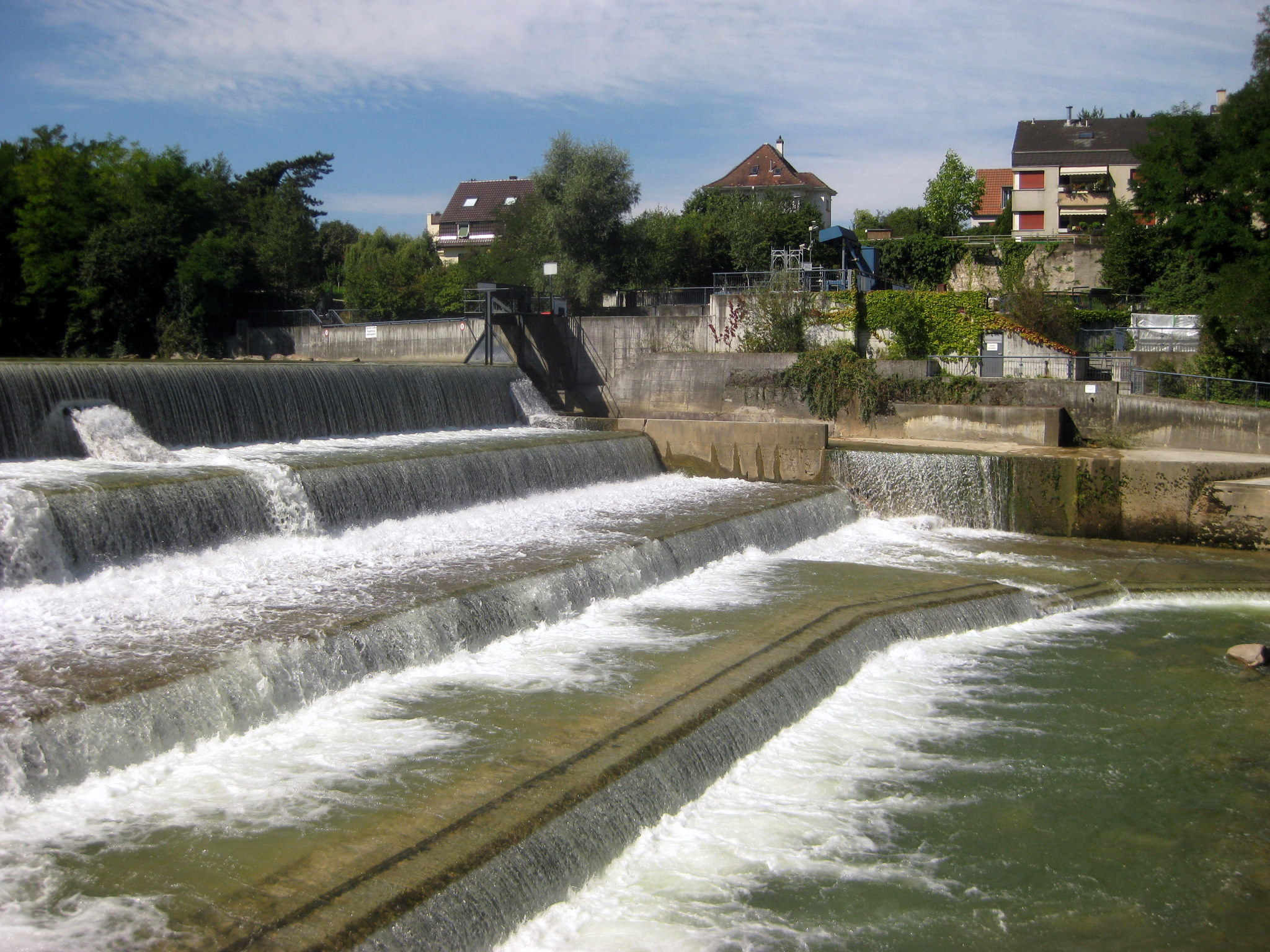

- Flag Coat of arms
- Location of Münchenstein
- Location within Switzerland Location within Canton of Basel-Landschaft
- Coordinates: 47°31′N 7°37′E
- Country: Switzerland
- Canton: Basel-Landschaft
- District: Arlesheim

Area
  - Total: 7.18 km^{2} (2.77 sq mi)
- Elevation: 297 m (974 ft)

Population (June 2021)
  - Total: 12,128
  - Density: 1,690/km^{2} (4,370/sq mi)
- Time zone: UTC+01:00 (CET)
  - Summer (DST): UTC+02:00 (CEST)
- Postal code: 4142
- SFOS number: 2769
- ISO 3166 code: CH-BL
- Surrounded by: Arlesheim, Basel (BS), Muttenz, Reinach
- Website: muenchenstein.ch

Münchenstein (Swiss German: Minggestai) is a municipality in the district of Arlesheim in the canton of Basel-Landschaft in Switzerland.

== Historical records ==
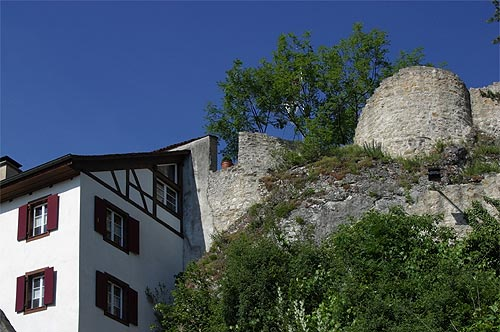
Ruins of Münchenstein Castle.

Münchenstein is first mentioned in 1196 as Kekingen. In 1270, it was mentioned as Geckingen and in 1279 as Munchenstein.

- 1259: The hamlet and the mill, between "Neue Welt" and St. Jakob, are mentioned in a deed as being owned by the Basel Dompropstei (Provost's Church).
- 1270: The village is named in the Bishop of Basel diocese certificate as Geckingen.
- 1295: The mention of the name in the current form "Munchenstein", which means the "rock of the castle of the Münchs". The first part of the name refers to the builders of the castle, and the second part means stone and refers to the foundations of the castle.
- 1324: The Münchs were not able keep the village and castle for long as their own Property, they had to hand over ownership to the Graf von Pfirt, who then lent it to the Münchs in fief. Following the death of the last Graf on Pfirt, Ulrich III., in March 1324 the castle and the village of Münchenstein went as inheritance to the Herzog of Austria, as heiress Johanna von Pfirt (Jeanne de Ferrette) (1300–1351) married with Herzog Albrecht II. von Habsburg (1298–1358).
- 1334: in the certificate of the Basel diocese the name is explained as " Geckingen que nunc Munchenstein appellatur" (Gekingen that is now referred to as Munchenstein).
- 1356: The Basel earthquake was on 18 October 1356. Many villages and castles in the area were badly damaged. The Münchenstein castle was also damaged but soon restored to its original condition.
- 1421: the mutated vowel "ö" is used and the village name is written as Mönchenstein.
- 1470: Due to financial problems the Münchs had to pawn the village and castle to the regency of the city of Basel. The bondage contract was signed on 18 July. The governance/sovereignty of Münchenstein passed into the authority of the city for the first time.
- 1797/98: Revolution and demolition of the castle.
- 1875: The inauguration of the railway line Jurabahn Basel-Delémont on 23 September [1875].

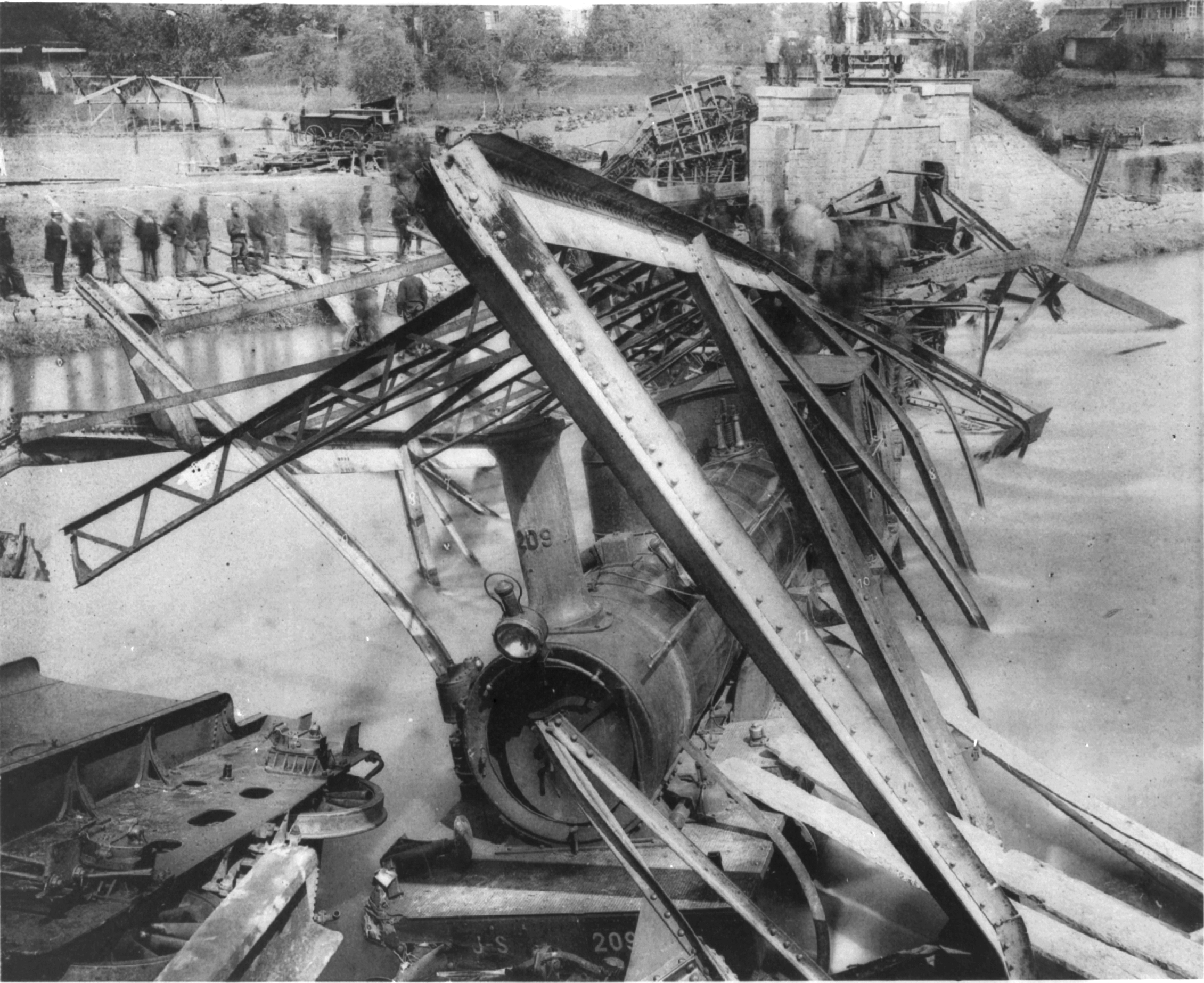
Munchenstein rail disaster in 1891

- 1881: the name Münchenstein is officially introduced in a scripted statute law.
- 1891: The Münchenstein rail disaster (on Sunday 14 June 1891) was among the worst ever to affect Switzerland. A crowded passenger train fell through a girder bridge constructed by Gustave Eiffel, killing 73 and injuring 171 people.
- 1957: Das Neue Haas Grotesk, otherwise known to the world for its subsequent font name, Helvetica, is born in Munchenstein.
- 1980: Münchenstein is the host municipality for the 2nd Swiss exhibition for garden and Landscaping "Grün 80".
- 1997: The Kuspo (a multi functional complex, sport and culture) is completed and opened.
- 2011: Europe's second longest tramline 10 operated by Baselland Transport (BLT) on the way to Dornach derails and crashes into a house at Tramstrasse after the Münchenstein Dorf stop on Wednesday 2 November at 23.35 injuring six and causing damages of over 100,000 Swiss Francs.

== Geography ==
Aerial view (1967)

Münchenstein has an area, as of 2009, of 7.18 square kilometers (2.77 sq mi). Of this area, 1.12 km^{2} (0.43 sq mi) or 15.6% is used for agricultural purposes, while 1.73 km^{2} (0.67 sq mi) or 24.1% is forested. Of the rest of the land, 4.17 km^{2} (1.61 sq mi) or 58.1% is settled (buildings or roads), 0.15 km^{2} (37 acres) or 2.1% is either rivers or lakes and 0.01 km^{2} (2.5 acres) or 0.1% is unproductive land.

Of the built up area, industrial buildings made up 8.6% of the total area while housing and buildings made up 23.7% and transportation infrastructure made up 12.4%. while parks, green belts and sports fields made up 12.5%. Out of the forested land, 23.0% of the total land area is heavily forested and 1.1% is covered with orchards or small clusters of trees. Of the agricultural land, 8.6% is used for growing crops and 5.3% is pastures, while 1.7% is used for orchards or vine crops. Of the water in the municipality, 0.6% is in lakes and 1.5% is in rivers and streams.

The municipality is located in the Arlesheim district, at an elevation of 297 m (974 ft) above sea level. It is divided into three sub-districts, Münchenstein Dorf, Neumünchenstein and Neue Welt/Brüglingen. The river Birs flows through Münchenstein. The northern boundary of the Municipality borders on the canton Basel-City. Further bordering municipalities are Muttenz, Arlesheim and Reinach.

== Coat of arms ==
The blazon of the municipal coat of arms is Argent, a Monk habited unhooded Sable and shoed Gules passant. The emblem is an equivalent of the official seal of Münch family.

== Demographics ==
Münchenstein has a population (as of June 2021) of 12,128. As of 2008, 20.4% of the population are resident foreign nationals. Over the last 10 years (1997–2007) the population has changed at a rate of -0.5%.

Most of the population (as of 2000) speaks German (10,203 or 87.2%), with Italian being second most common (435 or 3.7%) and French being third (193 or 1.6%). There were eight people who spoke Romansh as of the last census.

As of 2008, the gender distribution of the population was 48.7% male and 51.3% female. The population was made up of 9,281 Swiss citizens (78.4% of the population), and 2,560 non-Swiss residents (21.6%) Of the population in the municipality 2,272 or about 19.4% were born in Münchenstein and lived there in 2000. There were 1,716 or 14.7% who were born in the same canton, while 4,888 or 41.8% were born somewhere else in Switzerland, and 2,412 or 20.6% were born outside of Switzerland.

In 2008 there were 65 live births to Swiss citizens and 37 births to non-Swiss citizens, and in same time span there were 92 deaths of Swiss citizens and 7 non-Swiss citizen deaths. Ignoring immigration and emigration, the population of Swiss citizens decreased by 27 while the foreign population increased by 30. There were 12 Swiss men and 11 Swiss women who emigrated from Switzerland. At the same time, there were 41 non-Swiss men and 25 non-Swiss women who immigrated from another country to Switzerland. The total Swiss population change in 2008 (from all sources, including moves across municipal borders) was an increase of 54 and the non-Swiss population change was an increase of 88 people. This represents a population growth rate of 1.2%.

The age distribution, as of 2010, in Münchenstein is; 691 children or 5.8% of the population are between 0 and 6 years old and 1,630 teenagers or 13.8% are between 7 and 19. Of the adult population, 1,379 people or 11.6% of the population are between 20 and 29 years old. 1,454 people or 12.3% are between 30 and 39, 1,988 people or 16.8% are between 40 and 49, and 2,201 people or 18.6% are between 50 and 64. The senior population distribution is 1,684 people or 14.2% of the population are between 65 and 79 years old and there are 814 people or 6.9% who are over 80.

As of 2000, there were 4,336 people who were single and never married in the municipality. There were 5,910 married individuals, 781 widows or widowers and 675 individuals who are divorced.

As of 2000, there were 5,218 private households in the municipality, and an average of 2.2 persons per household. There were 1,755 households that consist of only one person and 232 households with five or more people. Out of a total of 5,276 households that answered this question, 33.3% were households made up of just one person and 36 were adults who lived with their parents. Of the rest of the households, there are 1,712 married couples without children, 1,344 married couples with children. There were 298 single parents with a child or children. There were 73 households that were made up unrelated people and 58 households that were made some sort of institution or another collective housing.

In 2000 there were 1,705 single family homes (or 67.8% of the total) out of a total of 2,514 inhabited buildings. There were 504 multi-family buildings (20.0%), along with 213 multi-purpose buildings that were mostly used for housing (8.5%) and 92 other use buildings (commercial or industrial) that also had some housing (3.7%). Of the single family homes 132 were built before 1919, while 163 were built between 1990 and 2000. The greatest number of single family homes (488) were built between 1919 and 1945.

In 2000 there were 5,441 apartments in the municipality. The most common apartment size was 3 rooms of which there were 1,643. There were 216 single room apartments and 1,466 apartments with five or more rooms. Of these apartments, a total of 5,097 apartments (93.7% of the total) were permanently occupied, while 225 apartments (4.1%) were seasonally occupied and 119 apartments (2.2%) were empty. As of 2007, the construction rate of new housing units was 0.8 new units per 1000 residents. As of 2000 the average price to rent a two-room apartment was about 823.00 CHF (US$660, £370, €530), a three-room apartment was about 1023.00 CHF (US$820, £460, €650) and a four-room apartment cost an average of 1249.00 CHF (US$1000, £560, €800). The vacancy rate for the municipality, in 2008, was 0.52%.

== Historic population ==
The historical population is given in the following chart:

== Education ==
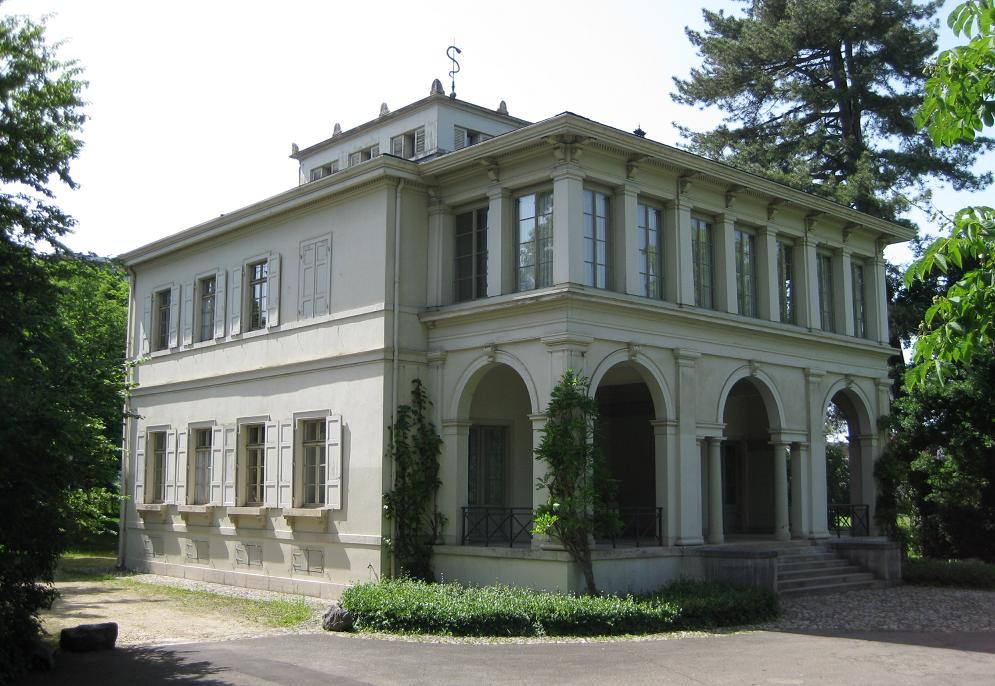
(Villa Ehinger) Music School

Kindergarten: Ameisenhölzli, Bündten, Dillacker, Ehinger, Lange Heid, Neuewelt, Teichweg
Primary Schools: Lange Heid, Pavillon Dillacker, Loog, Löffelmatt, Neue Welt
Secondary Schools: Loog, Lärchen
Other Schools: Gymnasium Münchenstein, Heilpädagogische Schule, the Music School, Rudolf Steiner Schule, TSM-Schulzentrum für Kinder und Jugendliche mit Behinderungen, Volkshochschule Basel Erwachsenenbildung Münchenstein und Erwachsenenbildung Gymnasium Münchenstein, Bildungszentrum Gesundheit BZG Basel-Stadt

In Münchenstein about 4,797 or (41.0%) of the population have completed non-mandatory upper secondary education, and 1,710 or (14.6%) have completed additional higher education (either university or a Fachhochschule). Of the 1,710 who completed tertiary schooling, 60.1% were Swiss men, 25.5% were Swiss women, 8.8% were non-Swiss men and 5.7% were non-Swiss women.

As of 2000, there were 1,000 students in Münchenstein who came from another municipality, while 284 residents attended schools outside the municipality.

Münchenstein is home to the Gemeindebibliothek (municipal library of Münchenstein). The library has (as of 2008) 18,363 books or other media, and loaned out 94,351 items in the same year. It was open a total of 260 days with average of 22 hours per week during that year.

== Heritage sites of national significance ==
The Bruckgut farming estate, the Foundation Herzog, the gardens and pool of St Jakob, the Kutschenmuseum (Carriage Museum), Schaulager, and Villa Merian (Business and Park) are listed as Swiss heritage site of national significance. The entire Brüglingen area is part of the Inventory of Swiss Heritage Sites.

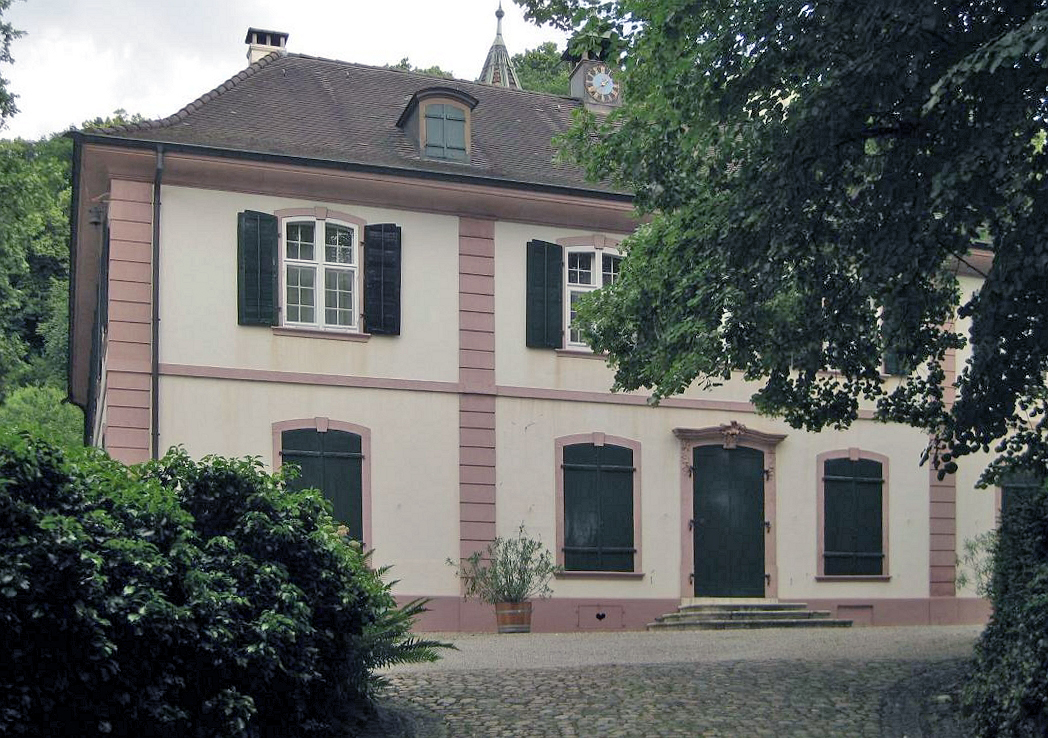
Bruckgut

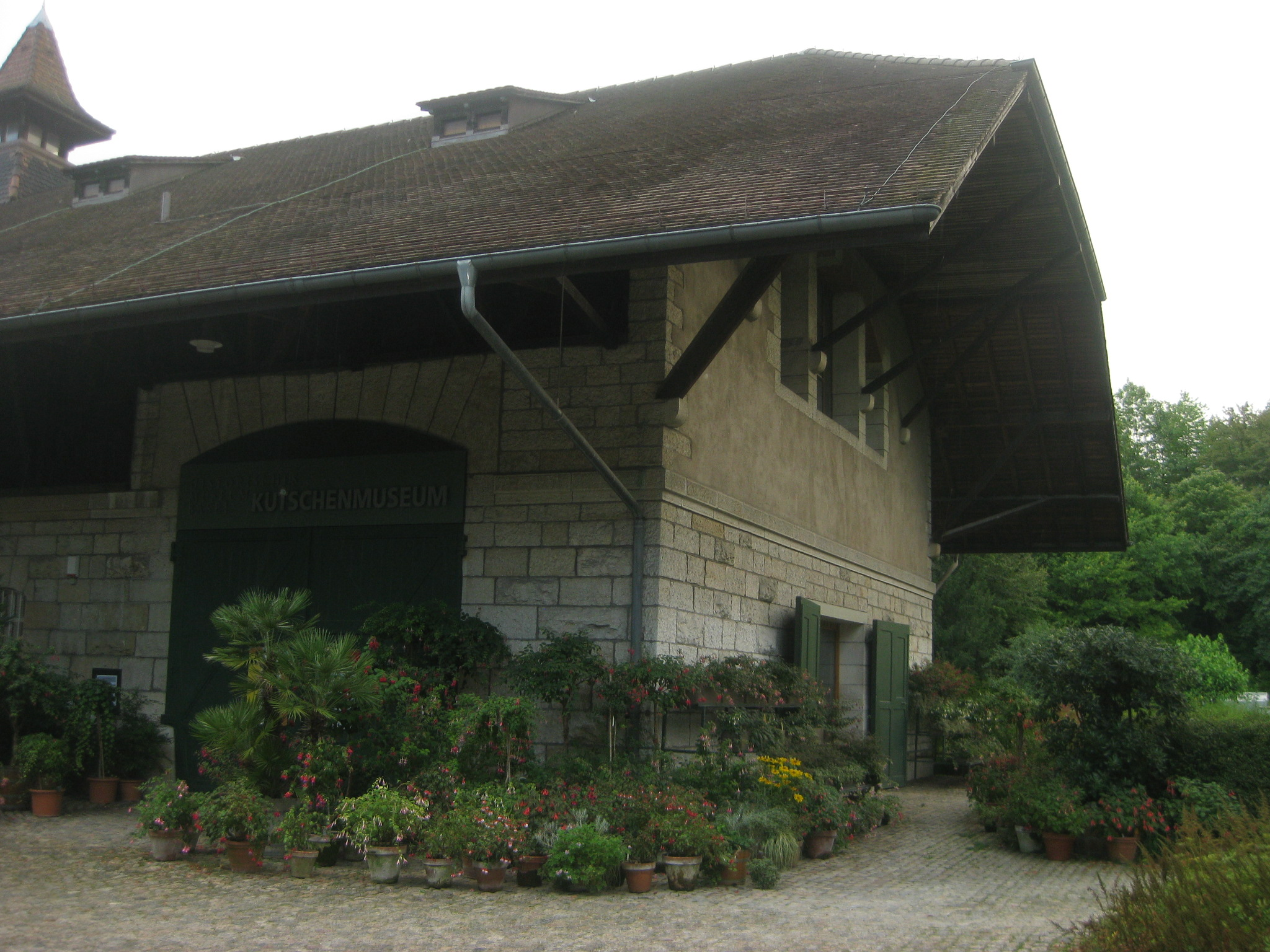
Kutschenmuseum (Carriage Museum)

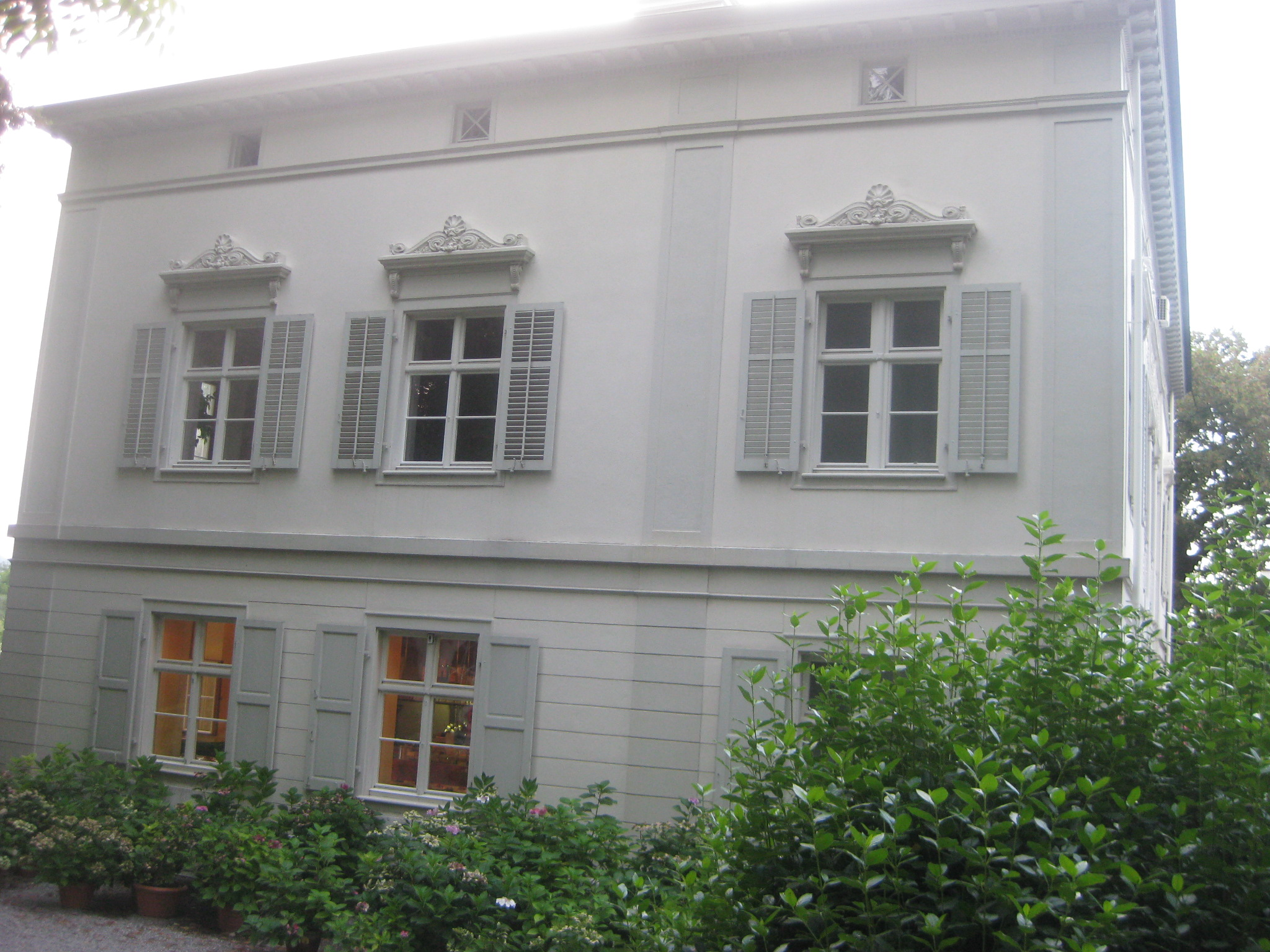
Villa Merian (Business and Park)

=== Museums ===
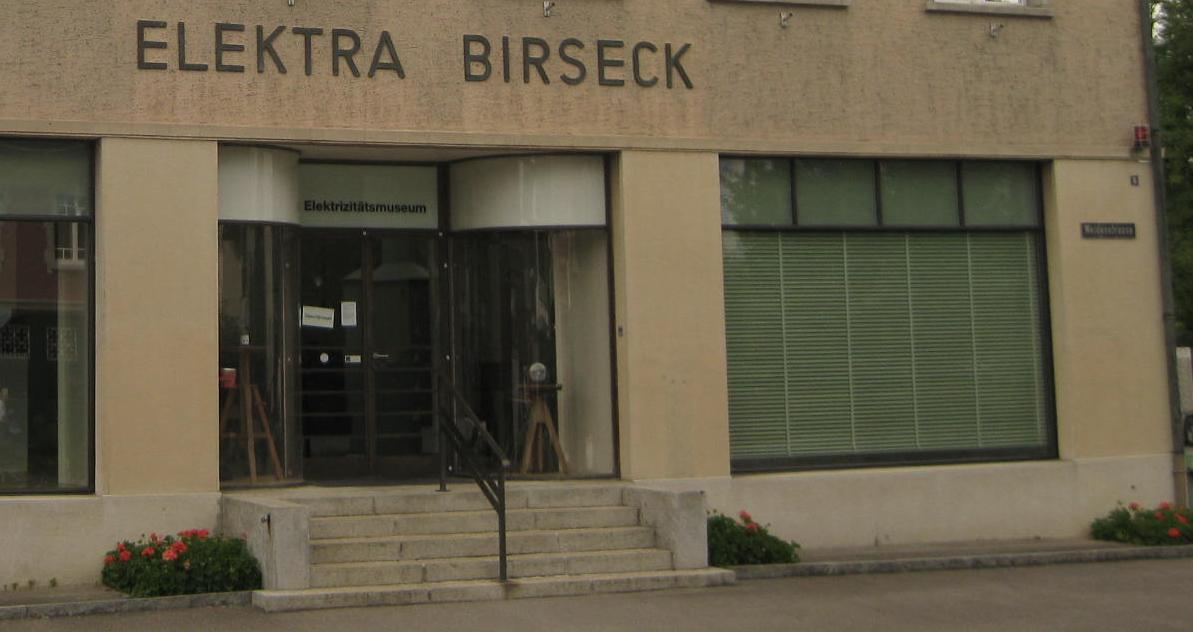
The entrance to the Elektrizitätsmuseum

- Schaulager: a mix between public museum, art storage facility and art research institute. Primarily directed at a specialist audience, it is also open to the general public for special events and the annual exhibitions.
- Kutschenmuseum: (Coach and Carriage Museum), The privately owned Coach and Carriage Museum, section of the Basel Historical Museum can be found in a barn on the elevated plain above Brüglingen in the Park im Grünen/Merian Park.
- Watermill Museum Brüglingen: a late Gothic mill which stands in the lower plain of Brüglingen, in the sub-district Neue Welt.
- Elektrizitätsmuseum: (Museum of Electricity), Elektra Birseck Münchenstein
- Frog Museum: The privately owned Froschmuseum is in the sub-district Newmünchenstein and exhibits well over 13'600 Frogs in differing shapes, sizes and materials.
- Laboratorium für Photographie:

=== Places of interest / Sight seeing ===
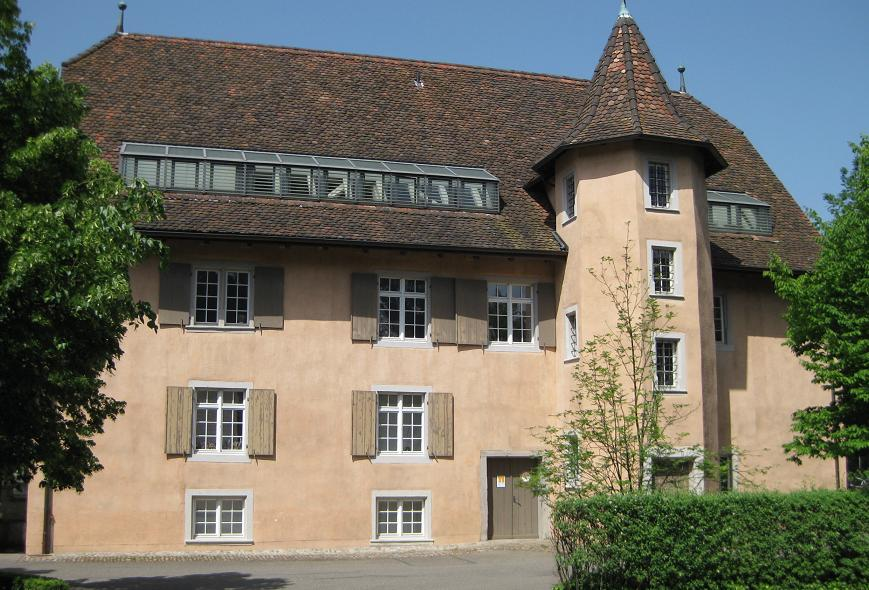
The hammer mill (Hammerschmiede), Neue Welt, refurbished in 1970

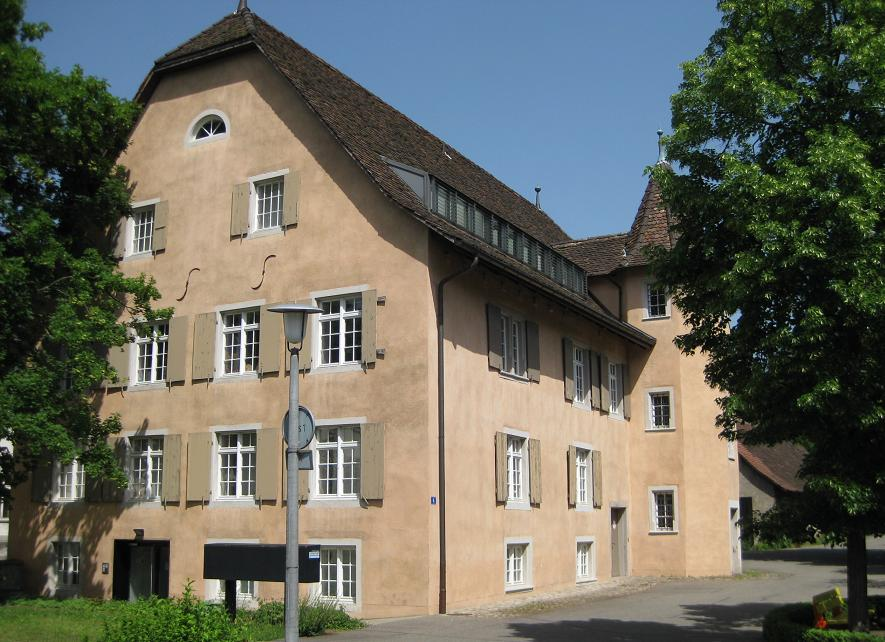
The hammer mill side entrance to the living quarters

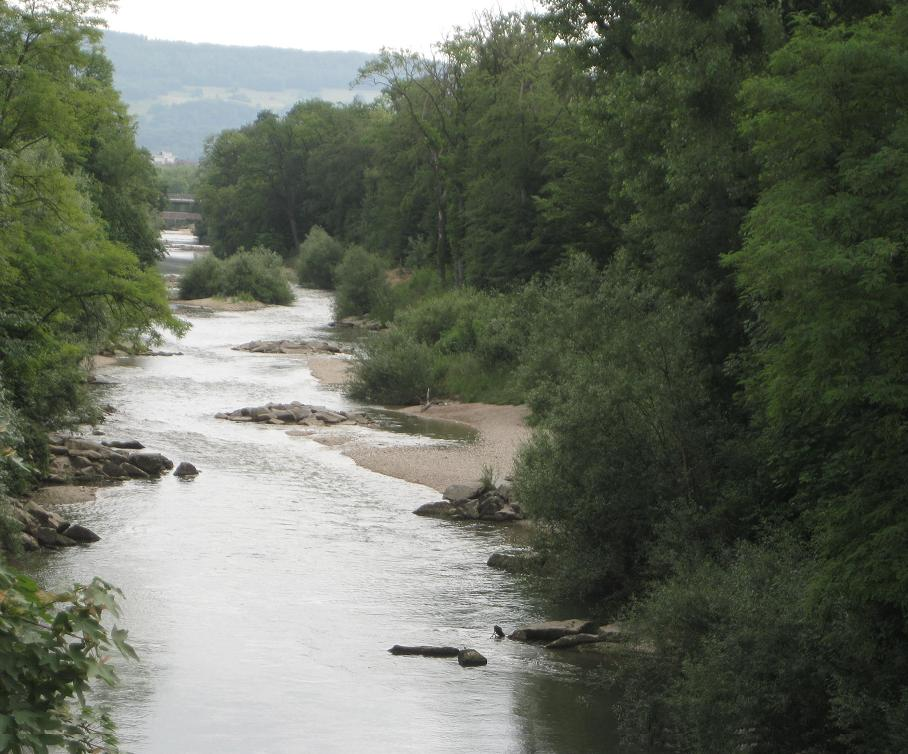
The Birs in Münchenstein

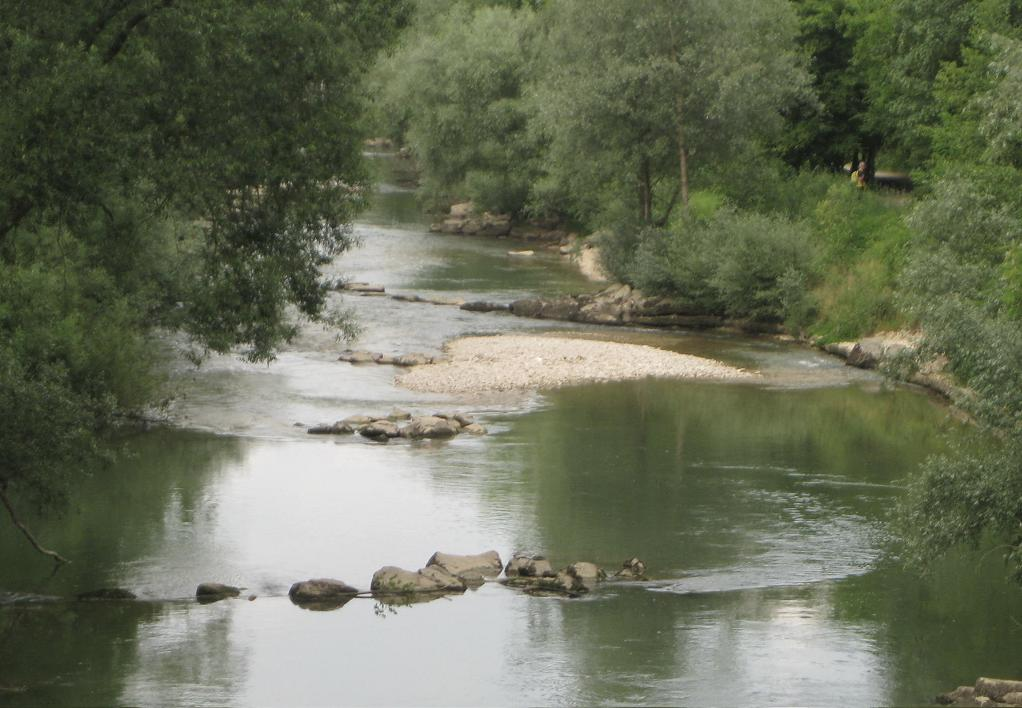
The Birs by the EBM

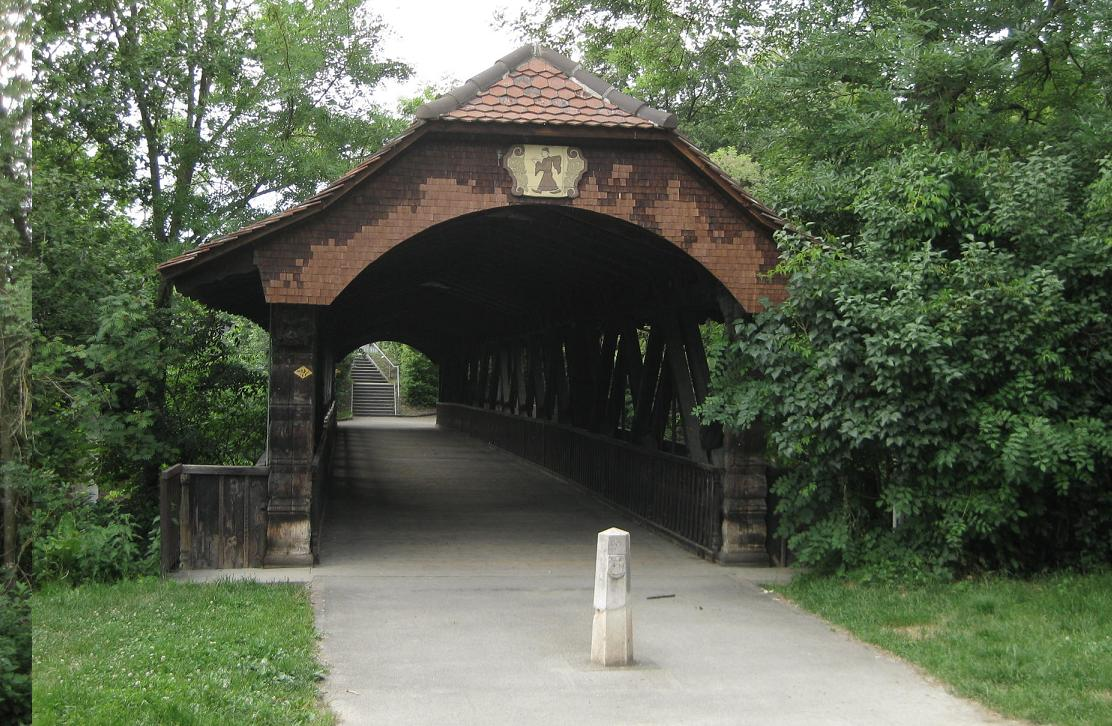
A wooden bridge over the Birs

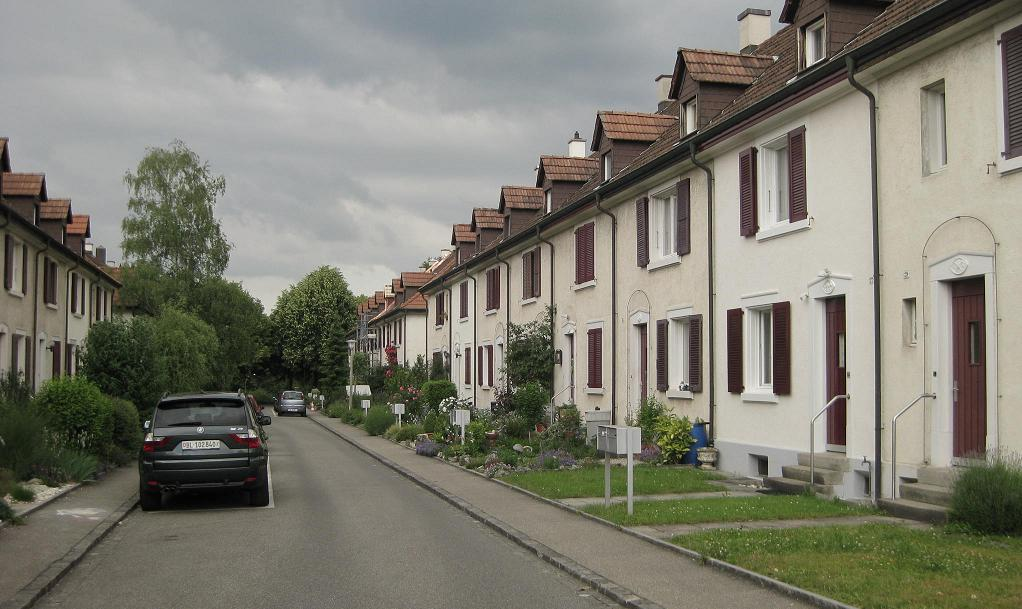
Wasserhaus residential estate

- The remains of the Münchenstein Castle, is a landmark above the village centre. The ruins of the Castle are situated on a long, but narrow rock.
- The village centre and the Trotte (formerly known as the Zehntentrotte) that lies at the foot of the castle rock.
- The Villa Merian (1711, refurbished 1859), with its English Garden, on the elevated plain above Brüglingen
- The sub-district Neue Welt, is the northernmost district of Münchenstein. The Neue Welt lies along the western bank of the river Birs.
- The hammer mill (Hammerschmiede), built 1660 by Ludwig Krug, is the oldest building in the Neue Welt. During 1822 the hammer mill was refurbished as a cotton-spinning mill by Felix Sarasin (1771–1839). The hammer mill was restored and completely refurbished in 1970 by the Chr.Merianische Stiftung and consequently placed under monument conservation a year later.
- The Villa Ehinger (1832), in the Neue Welt, built for Ludwig August Sarasin by the architect Melchior Berri.
- The residential estate Wasserhaus (1920/21), developed by the architect Wilhelm Eduard Brodtbeck (1873–1957) from Liestal (canton Baselland), concluding the plans drawn by Prof. Hans Benno Bernoulli (1876–1959), in the sub-district "Neue Welt".
- St. Jakobshalle (1970) is an indoor arena located on the border between Basel and Münchenstein, which serves as the home area of the Swiss Indoors tennis tournament and the host arena for the Eurovision Song Contest 2025.

== Politics ==
In the 2007 federal election the most popular party was the SP which received 31.98% of the vote. The next three most popular parties were the SVP (25.04%), the FDP (14.99%) and the Green Party (13.81%). In the federal election, a total of 3,708 votes were cast, and the voter turnout was 47.1%.

== Economy ==
As of 2007, Münchenstein had an unemployment rate of 2.48%. As of 2005, there were 153 people employed in the primary economic sector and about 20 businesses involved in this sector. 1,812 people were employed in the secondary sector and there were 126 businesses in this sector. 6,133 people were employed in the tertiary sector, with 490 businesses in this sector. There were 5,729 residents of the municipality who were employed in some capacity, of which females made up 45.2% of the workforce.

In 2008 the total number of full-time equivalent jobs was 7,603. The number of jobs in the primary sector was 27, of which 11 were in agriculture and 16 were in forestry or lumber production. The number of jobs in the secondary sector was 1,695, of which 1,140 or (67.3%) were in manufacturing and 404 (23.8%) were in construction. The number of jobs in the tertiary sector was 5,881. In the tertiary sector; 1,656 or 28.2% were in wholesale or retail sales or the repair of motor vehicles, 621 or 10.6% were in the movement and storage of goods, 211 or 3.6% were in a hotel or restaurant, 246 or 4.2% were in the information industry, 274 or 4.7% were the insurance or financial industry, 1,107 or 18.8% were technical professionals or scientists, 526 or 8.9% were in education and 419 or 7.1% were in health care.

In 2000, there were 7,982 workers who commuted into the municipality and 4,376 workers who commuted away. The municipality is a net importer of workers, with about 1.8 workers entering the municipality for every one leaving. About 16.6% of the workforce coming into Münchenstein are coming from outside Switzerland, while 0.2% of the locals commute out of Switzerland for work. Of the working population, 36.8% used public transportation to get to work, and 32.7% used a private car.

Elektra Birseck Münchenstein (EBM) has their head office in Münchenstein.

== Religion ==
From the 2000 census, 4,234 or 36.2% belonged to the Swiss Reformed Church, while 3,771 or 32.2% were Roman Catholic. Of the rest of the population, there were 138 members of an Orthodox church (or about 1.18% of the population), there were 36 individuals (or about 0.31% of the population) who belonged to the Christian Catholic Church, and there were 444 individuals (or about 3.79% of the population) who belonged to another Christian church. There were 12 individuals (or about 0.10% of the population) who were Jewish, and 390 (or about 3.33% of the population) who were Muslim. There were 69 individuals who were Buddhist, 86 individuals who were Hindu and 14 individuals who belonged to another church. 2,087 (or about 17.83% of the population) belonged to no church, are agnostic or atheist, and 421 individuals (or about 3.60% of the population) did not answer the question.

== Transport ==
Baselland Transport have two tramlines and three bus lines through Münchenstein. The line number 10 is the second longest tramline in Europe.

The Swiss Federal Railways have a station near the village centre.

== Clubs and associations ==
The alliance IGOM (Interessengemeinschaft der Ortsvereine Münchenstein) has 75 recognised clubs and associations.

== Notable people ==
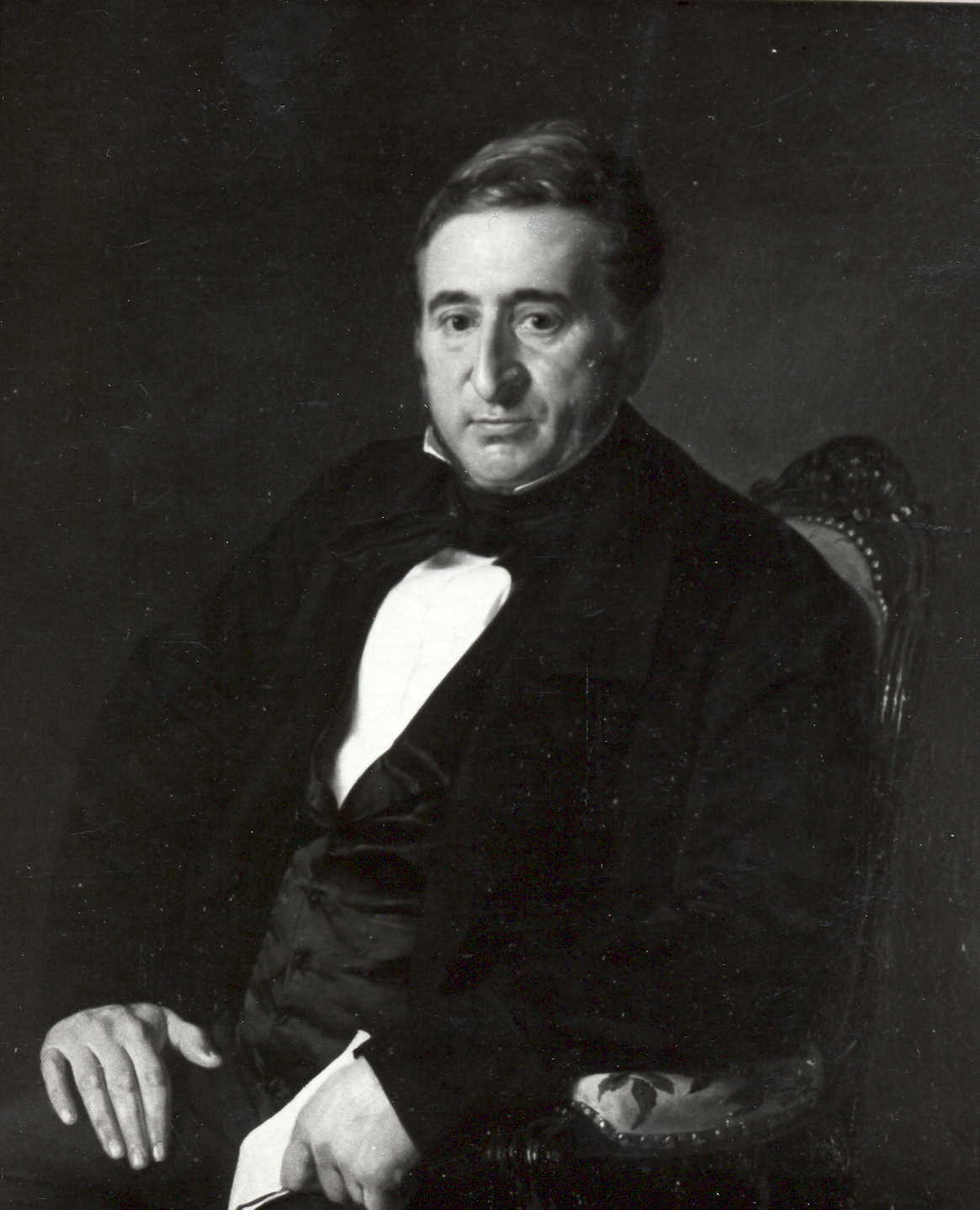
Christoph Merian, 1855

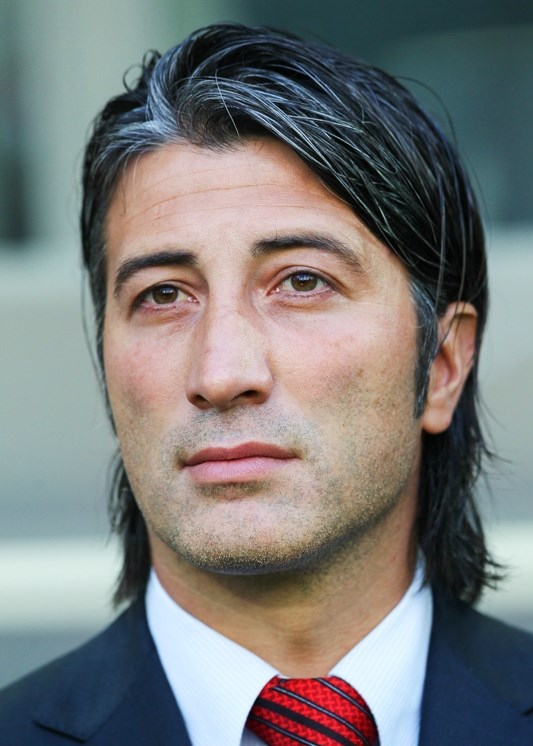
Murat Yakin, 2014

- The family Münch von Münchenstein, an influential family lineages in Basel between 1185 and 1759
- Christoph Merian (1800–1858), banker and businessman, founder of the Christoph Merian Stiftung
- Melchior Berri (1801–1854), Swiss architect
- Carl Geigy (1860–1943), Swiss philanthropist
- Anna Hegner (1881–1963), violinist, composer and music pedagogue, lived in Münchenstein from 1908
- Irène Zurkinden (1909–1987) was a Swiss painter, grew up in Münchenstein
- Philipp Aeby (born 1968) brought up in Münchenstein, the CEO of RepRisk
- Mathis Künzler (born 1978), a Swiss film, television and stage actor, grew up in suburban Münchenstein

Sport

- Murat Yakin (born 1974), a former Swiss football player, with 273 club caps and coach; 49 caps for the Switzerland national team
- Hakan Yakin (born 1977), a Swiss former footballer brought up in Münchenstein with 469 club caps and coach; 87 caps for the Switzerland national team
- Benjamin Huggel (born 1977) is a former Swiss footballer, brought up in Münchenstein with 350 club caps and coach; 41 caps for the Switzerland national team
- Roger Federer (born 1981), tennis player, grew up in Münchenstein
- Marco Chiudinelli (born 1981), tennis player, grew up in Münchenstein
