= Anna Hegner =

Swiss musician (1881–1963)

Anna Hegner (1 March 1881 – 3 February 1963) was a Swiss violinist, music composer and pedagogue. She was well-known as a violin soloist, and played concerts in Basel, Berlin, Leipzig and London. She taught in Frankfurt, Basel and Münchenstein, and founded a string quartet in Freiburg-im-Brisgau. Her notable students include Paul Hindemith. Anna-Hegner-Strasse in Basel was named in her honor.

== Biography ==
Anna Hegner was born in Basel into a respected family of musicians. Her father was Magnus Hegner, and her mother Anna Viccelio. Hegner studied violin with Adolphe Ludwig Stiehle and Hugo Heermann, before attending the Hochsen Conservatory in Frankfurt. Hegner became well known as a violin soloist. She was recognised for her concerts in Basel, Berlin, Leipzig and London. For some time she lived and worked in Frankfurt and was Paul Hindemith's private violin teacher. She taught for three years in Basel. In 1908 she moved to Münchenstein and there she organized classical concerts in the Catholic Church (also performing as soloist) and organized summer concerts in the small gorge behind her house. She was the Basel Symphony Orchestra's first woman leader.

She later lived in Freiburg-im-Brisgau and founded a string quartet there in 1911. Hegner composed many violin pieces and some songs.

She died in hospital in 1963 from the effects of an accident. Soon after her death, Anna-Hegner-Strasse was named after her and for a long time she was the only woman in the Basel area to be honored with a street name.

== Sources ==
Münchenstein Heimatkunde. Verlag des Kantons Basel-Landschaft, Liestal 1995, ISBN 3-85673-522-4.
