= Basel Dove =

Rare Swiss postage stamp, world's first tricolor stamp

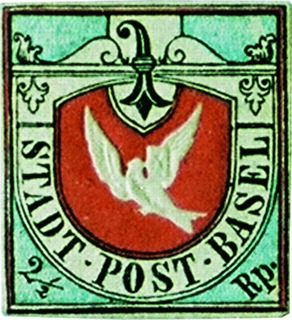
- Country of production: Switzerland
- Location of production: Basel
- Date of production: 1 July 1845
- Nature of rarity: Extremely rare
- No. in existence: Unknown
- Face value: 2½ rappen
- Estimated value: CHF 18,000; CHF 37,500 on cover

The Basel Dove (Basel German: Basler Dybli, German: Basler Taube) is a notable stamp issued by the Swiss canton of Basel on 1 July 1845 with a value of 2½-rappen. The stamp was printed in black, crimson and blue and was the first tricolor stamp in the world and the only postage stamp issued by Basel.

The stamp, designed by the architect Melchior Berri, featured a white embossed dove carrying a letter in its beak, and was inscribed STADT POST BASEL ("City Post Office Basel"). It was valid for use until 30 September 1854, by which time 41,480 stamps had been printed.

At the time, each canton was responsible for its own postal service. There were no uniform postal rates for Switzerland until after the establishment of a countrywide postal service on 1 January 1849. The only other cantons to issue their own stamps were Zürich and Geneva.

== See also ==
- List of notable postage stamps
- Stamps and postal history of Switzerland
