= Hans Benno Bernoulli =

Swiss architect and city planner (1876–1959)

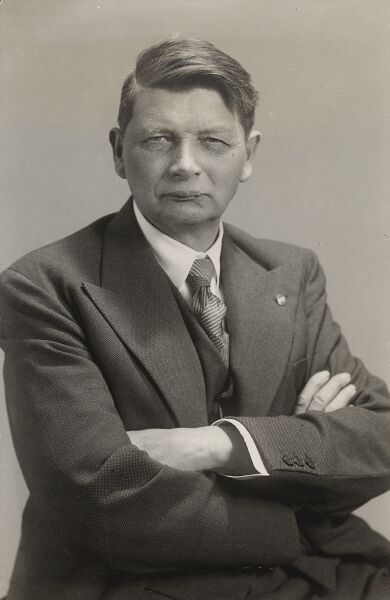
- Born: 17 February 1876; Basel, Switzerland
- Died: 12 September 1959 (aged 83); Basel, Switzerland
- Education: Technical University of Munich
- Occupation: Architect
- Spouse: Anna Ziegler (m. 1904)
- Parent: Theodor Bernoulli
- Buildings: Bernoullihäuser in Zurich and Grenchen SO

Hans Benno Bernoulli (17 February 1876 – 12 September 1959) was a Swiss architect and city planner.

== Family ==
Bernoulli was born in Basel, the son of Theodor Bernoulli, an office clerk. He was descended from the Bernoulli family of mathematicians. The suffragette and feminist Elisabeth Bernoulli (1873–1935) was his sister.

In 1904, he married Anna Ziegler in Berlin.

== Career ==
He studied architecture at the Technical University of Munich and in 1902 started a partnership in Berlin. In 1912, he was appointed "chief architect" for the Basler building industry.

His most important housing development projects were:

- 1914–1929: Bernoullihäuser in Zürich, (Hardturmstrasse). The Bernoulli houses are named after the architect. These houses are a garden city project, from the 1920s and were meant to be sold without profit to the workers. You will find the Bernoulli houses on Zürich tram lines no. 8 and 17 between the stations Bernoulli and Hardturm.
- 1919: Bernoullihäuser in Grenchen SO (Rebgasse 61–67)
- 1920–1923: residential area Im langen Loh in Basel
- 1920–1923: residential estate Wasserhaus in the sub-district Neue Welt in Münchenstein, developed in partnership with Wilhelm Eduard Brodtbeck.
- 1924–1934: Living and residential area Hirzbrunnenareal in Basel

After the Second World War his main projects were in rebuilding the bombed and destroyed cities.

Hans Benno Bernoulli died aged 83 in Basel.

== Publications ==
- Die Stadt und Ihr Boden, Birkhäuser Verlag, 1991
