= Watermill Museum Brüglingen =

Mill museum in Münchenstein, Switzerland

Coordinates: 47.5343°N 7.61419°E

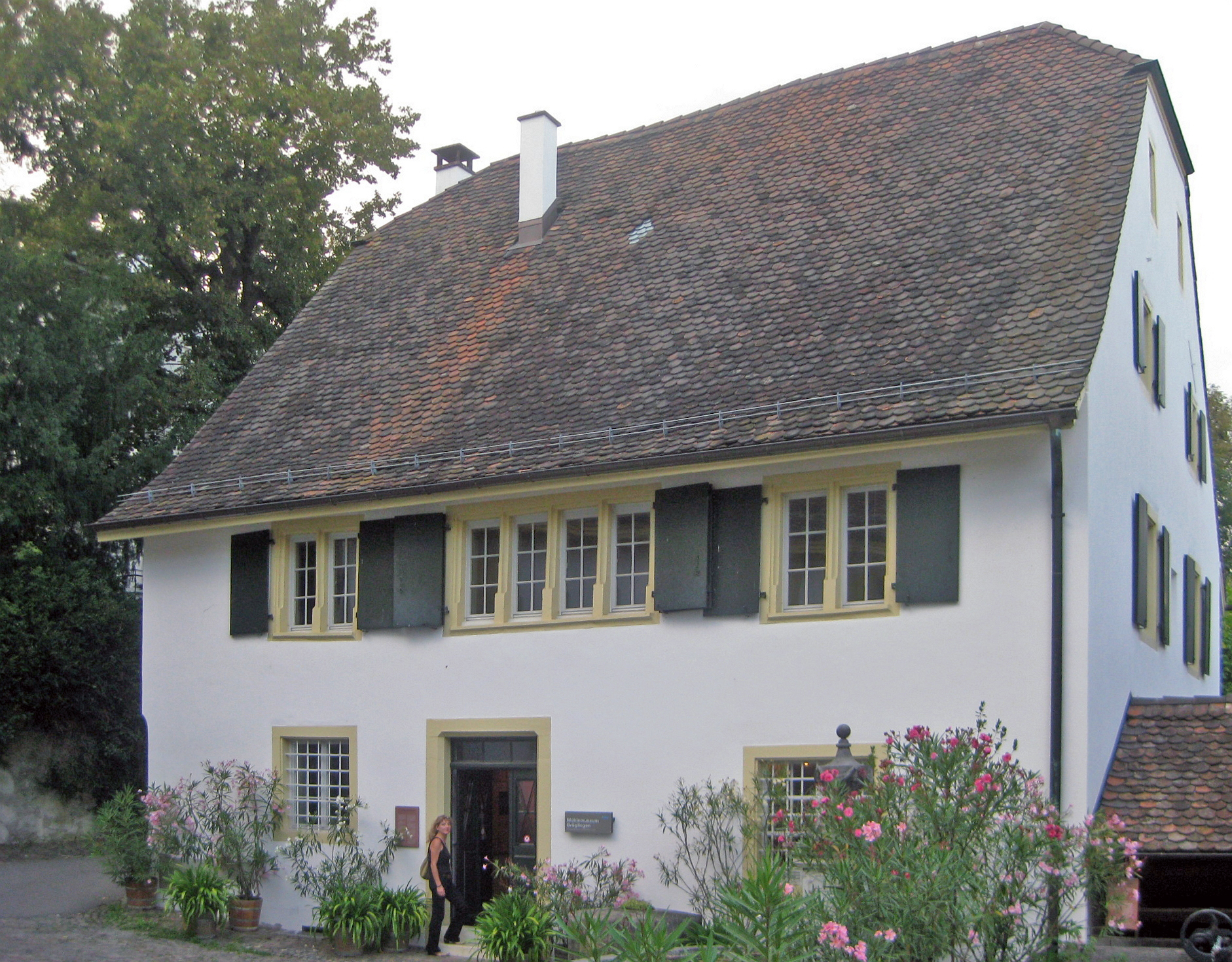
Watermill Museum Brüglingen, Münchenstein, Main Entrance

The Watermill Museum Brüglingen (Mühlemuseum Brüglingen) is housed within the former watermill and stands in the lower plain of Brüglingen, in the sub-district "Neue Welt", Münchenstein, in the canton of Basel-Country in Switzerland.

== Geographical location ==
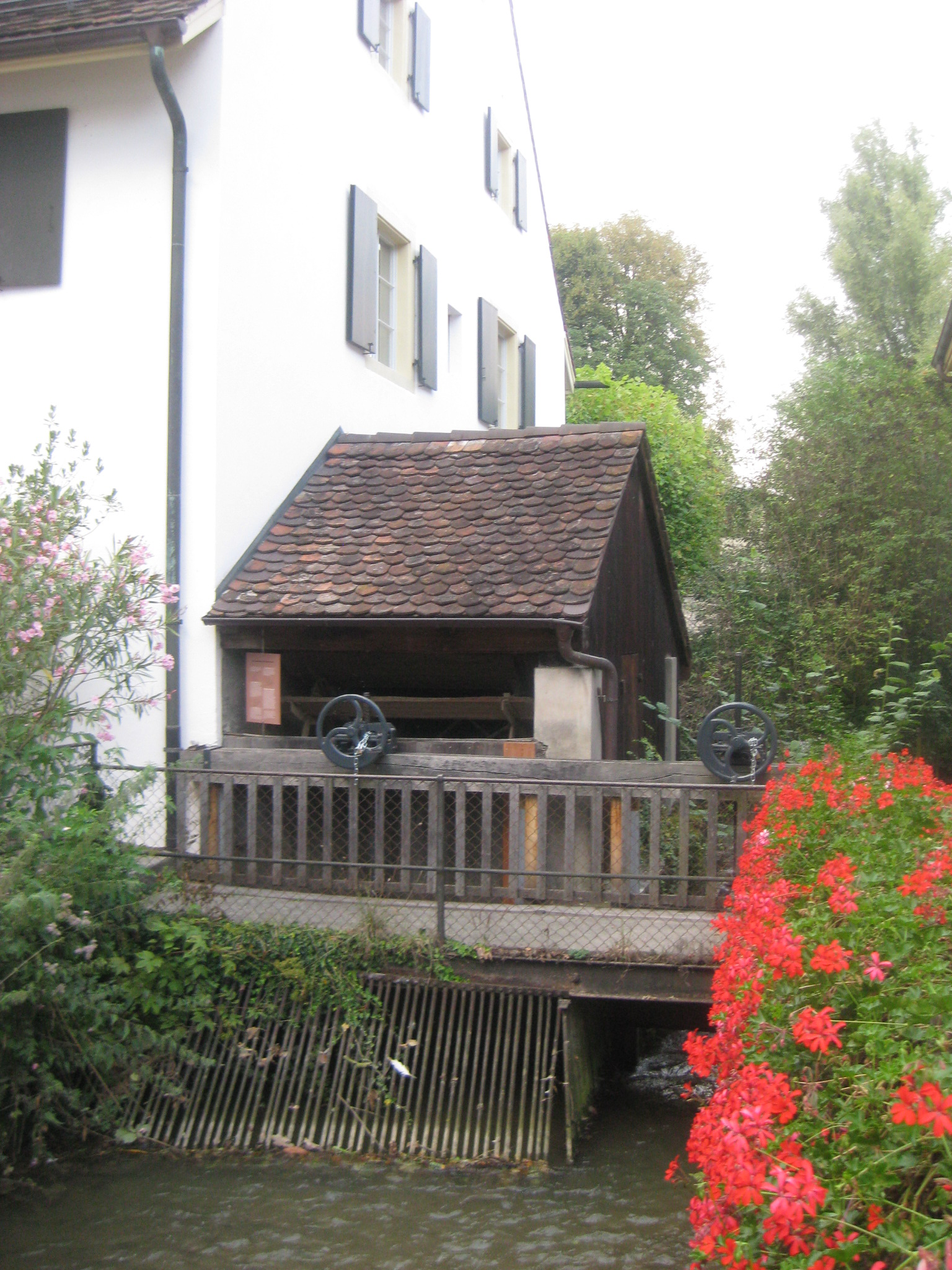
Watermill Museum, Brüglingen, the Water Wheel

The geographical area Brüglingen is a plain region that lies along the western bank of the river Birs between St. Jacob an der Birs (now part of Basel) and Münchenstein. The region called "Neue Welt" (the new world) evolved as the industry started to establish itself around the upper end of the "St. Alban-Teich", an artificial canal constructed during the 12th century to bring water and water power to the industry in Basel.

The late Gothic mill is situated directly below the Villa Merian and its English Garden. The Villa stands upon the elevated area above the Brüglinger plain.

== History ==
The hamlet and the mill between "Neue Welt" and St. Jakob an der Birs are mentioned in a deed in 1259 as being owned by the Basel Dompropstei (Provost's Church). Until the 16th century the mill was worked by a tenant who, in return, held the milling monopoly for the Dompropstei estate. Because the mill was situated upon a small hamlet of the river Birs, its existence was subject to flooding or water shortage.

In the 16th century the mill was rebuilt and during the years 1624/25, the canal was prolonged through Brüglingen and the former watermill stood on the bank of the hamlet that was exploited for this prolongation towards the Birs waterfall in Münchenstein, from where the water is sidetracked. In 1777 the mill was refurbished to the inhabit the miller.

In 1811 Christoph Merians senior bought the Brüglingen farm with the mill. In 1824 he gave it to his son Christoph Merian as wedding present. The Christoph Merian Stiftung refurbished the mill 1824 to a grain mill. Operating the mill continued until 1925, as from when it was used solely for storing grain for the estate.

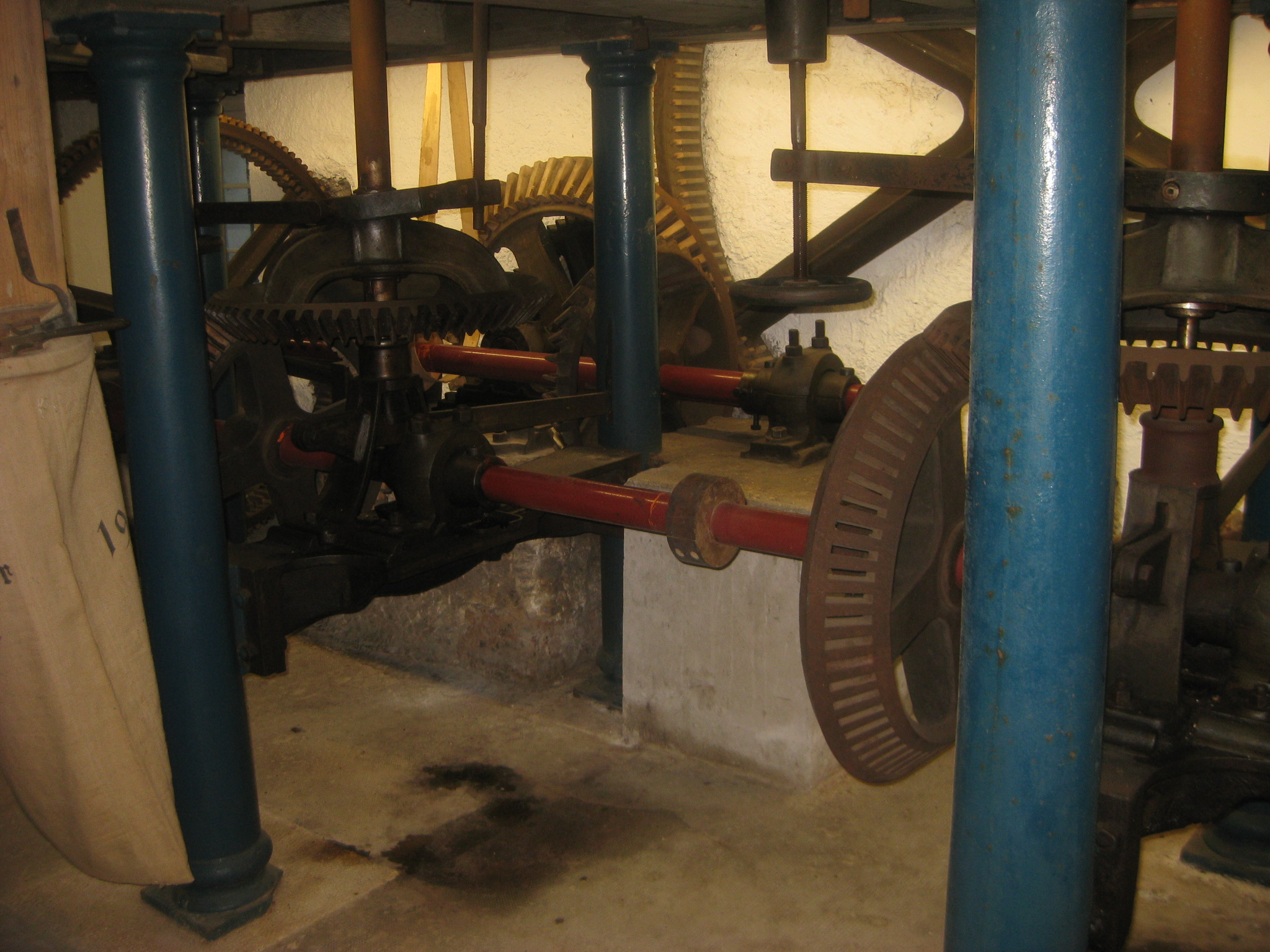
The functional Mill and Grinding Stone

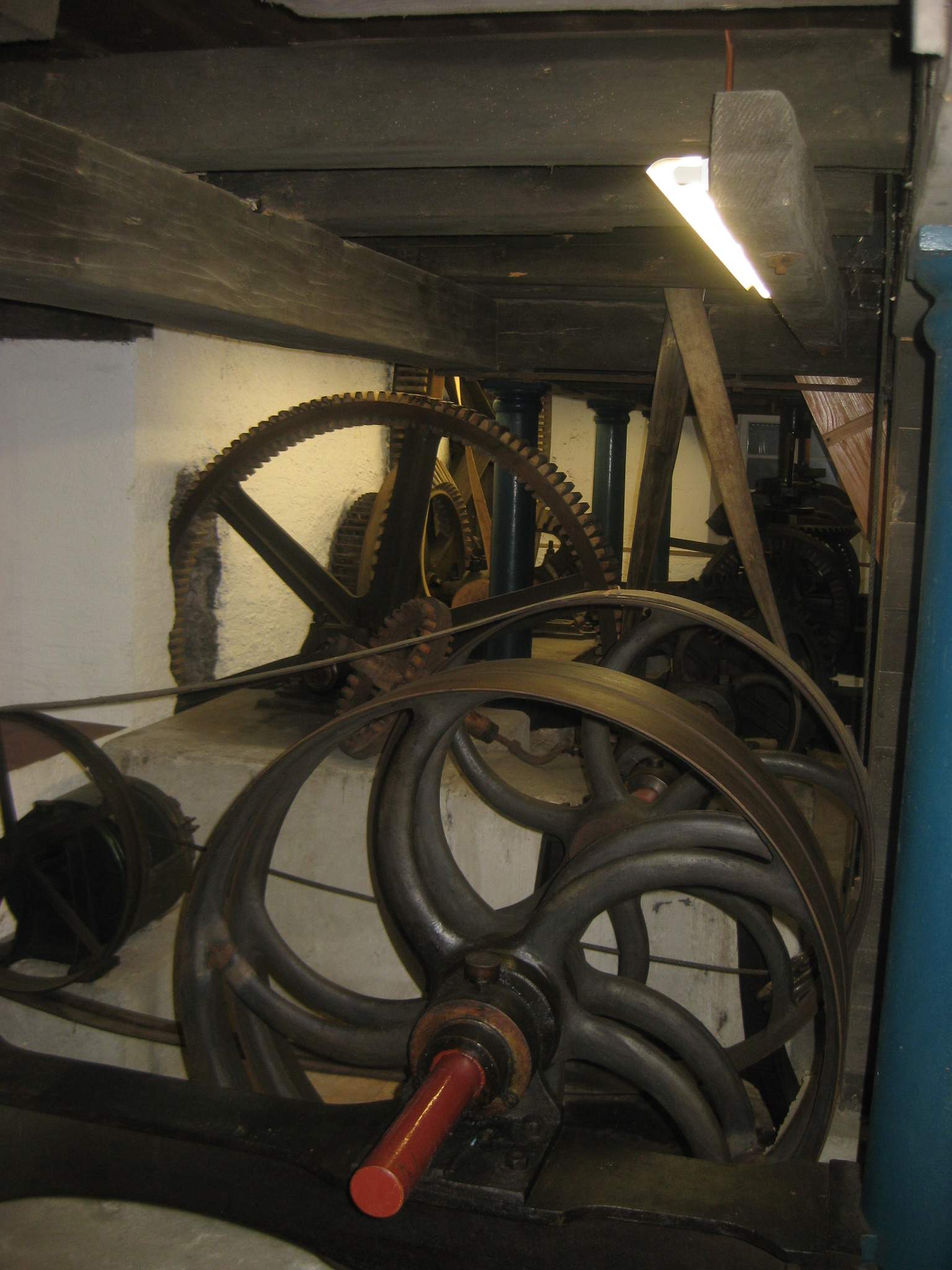
The Grinder

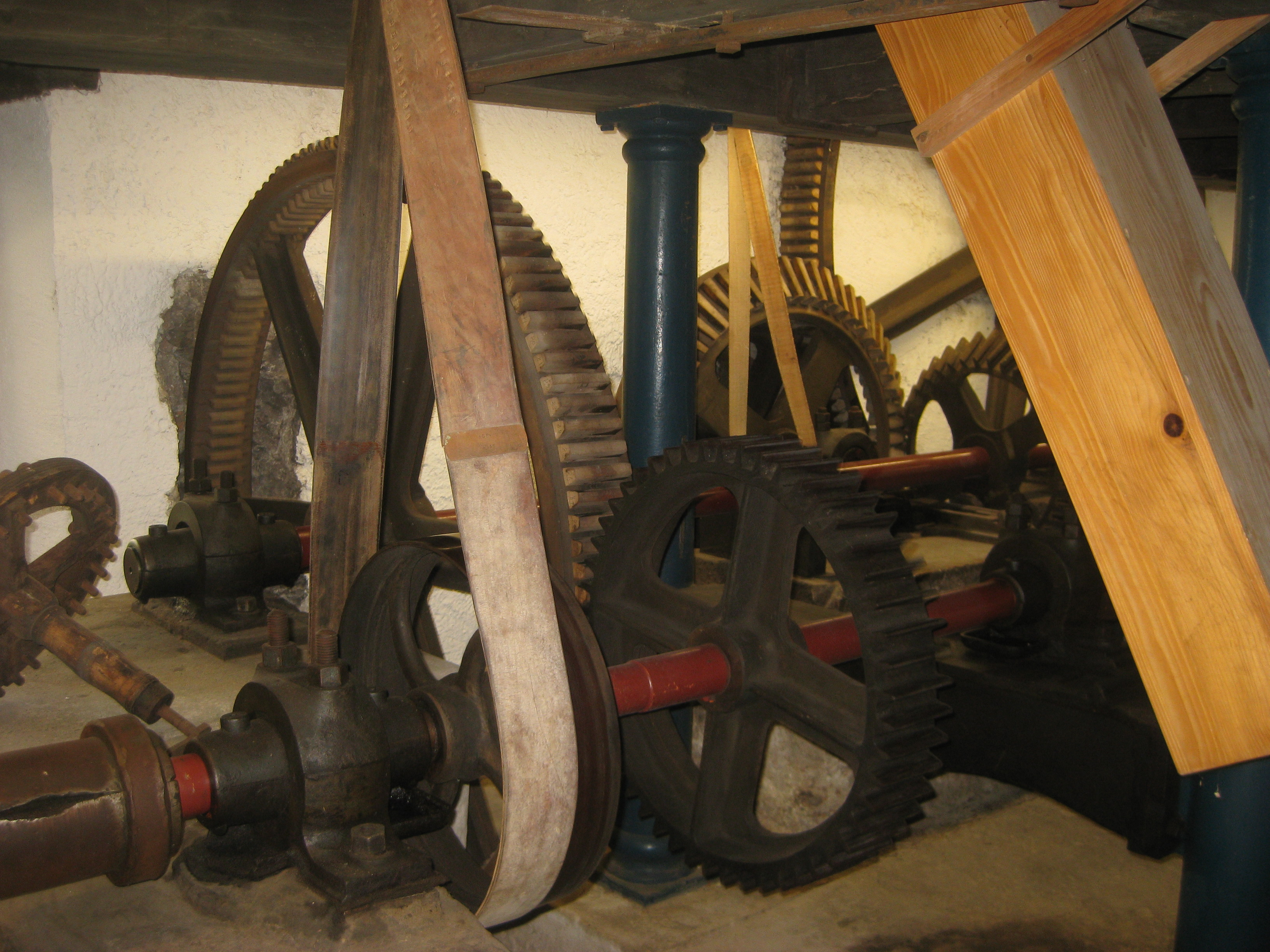
Part of the Grinding Exhibition

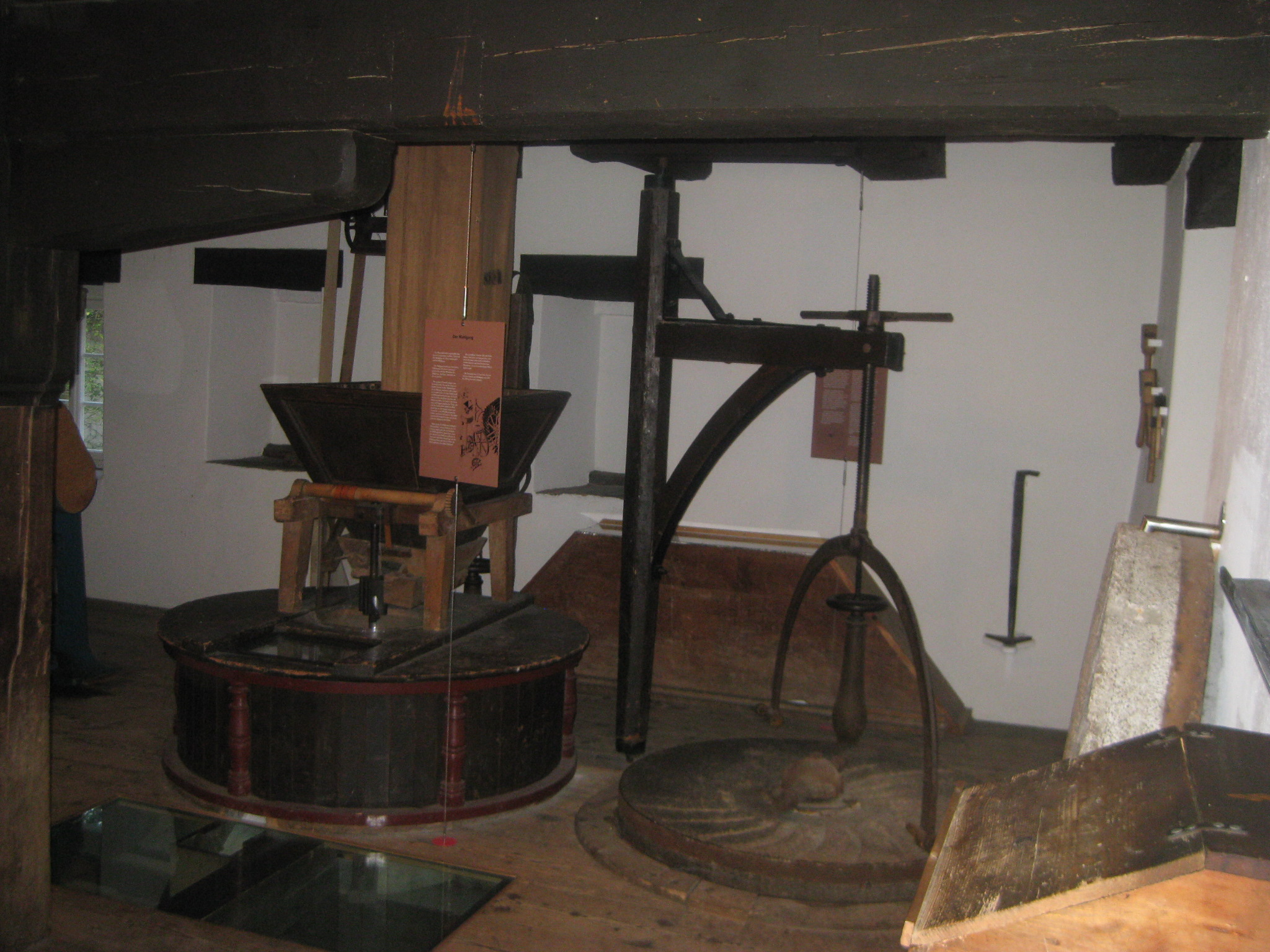
Exhibition

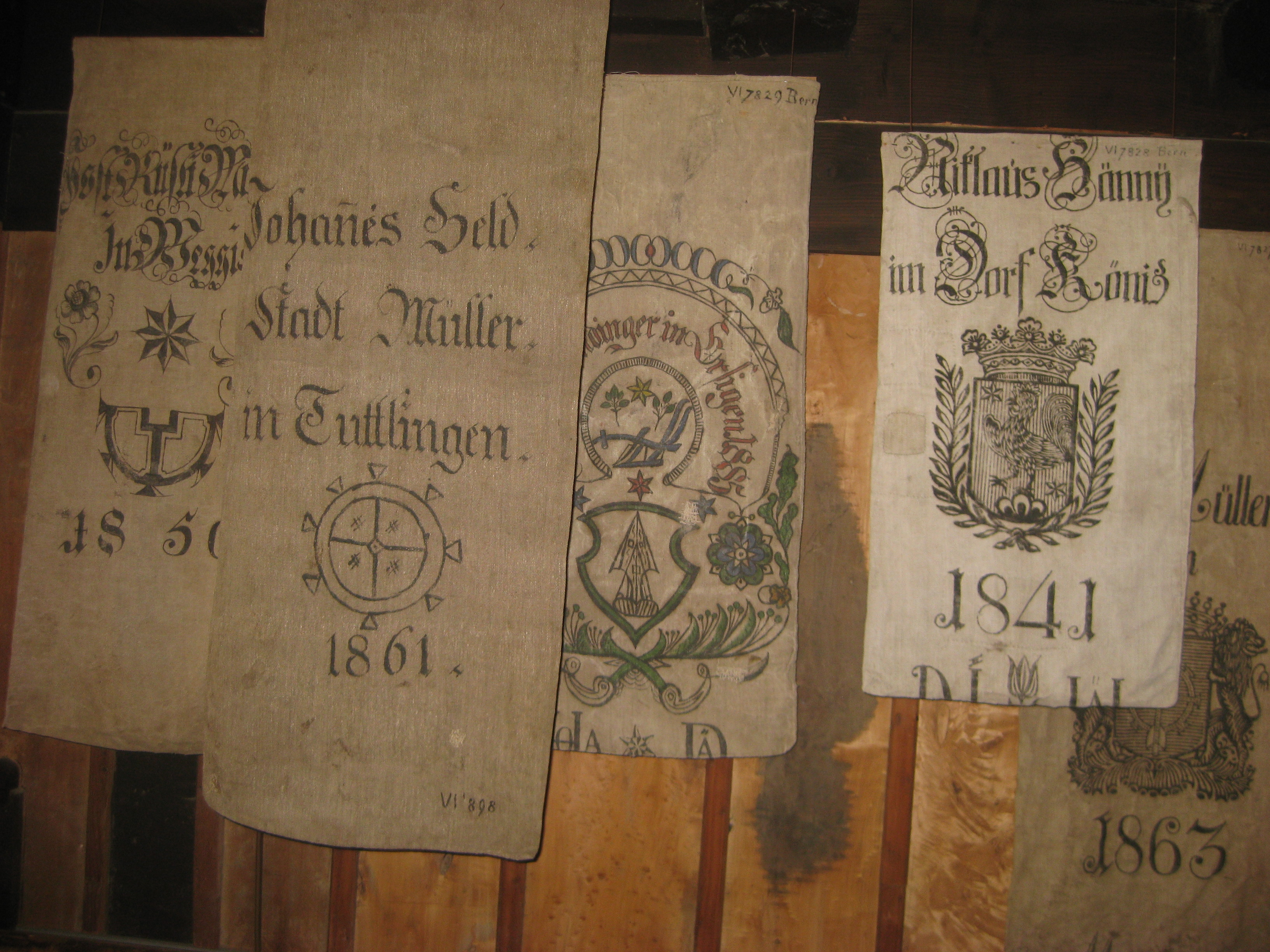
Old Flower Sacks from the 19th Century

The building has been used since 1966 as museum. New museum strategies were entered in 2002 and now the former watermill offers an exhibition on the history of the mill and millers’ daily work from the Bronze Age up to the present day. The mill and the grinder are still functional, therefore the museum shows the entire process from the water wheel to the water powered mechanism of the rotating mill wheel and grinders.

== See also ==
- List of museums in Switzerland
