= Wilhelm Eduard Brodtbeck =

Swiss architect (1873–1957)

Wilhelm Eduard Brodtbeck (25 September 1873 in Liestal – 12 April 1957, in Liestal) was a Swiss architect from Liestal canton Basel-Country.

== Biography ==
=== Early life ===
Wilhelm Eduard, son of Wilhelm senior (architect and cement factory owner) and Susanne Karoline Spinnler, grew up in Liestal.

Primarily Wilhelm Brodtbeck visited schools in Liestal and then at a later age in Basel. He then studied architecture, concluding at the University of Stuttgart und at the University of Karlsruhe. Later he made various studium journeys in Germany, Holland, Austria, Italy and France, hereafter Brodtbeck worked in Lausanne.

He married Susanna Elisabeth Buess from Wenslingen, Basel-Country, in 1904.

=== Career ===
Wilhelm Brodtbeck founded his own architect's office in 1901 in Liestal. As young architect he accomplished a large variety of residential houses. Later he expanded his horizon and realized schools complexes and industrial buildings.

As from 1921, together with his partner Fritz Bohny, he managed the architecture bureau W. Brodtbeck AG. In 1952 Rolf Georg Otto was invited by Brodtbeck to take over the well recognized business. The two founders members withdrew themselves from the daily business. Bohny retired, but Brodtbeck remained in the board of directors as president until his death in 1957. The well renowned firm still exists today under the name Otto und Partner.

== Legacy ==
Throughout the district of Basel, the architect's bureau W. Brodtbeck AG became famous due to their modern style buildings. Be it in partnership work with other companies, W. Brodtbeck AG were able to realise two important projects in Basel city. These are the city of Basel casino (1939–1941) and, for the chemical enterprise Sandoz, the administrative and head office building.

Further important projects from Brodtbeck's architecture bureau are, for example, the school complex "Rotackerschulhaus" in Liestal, the bank "Kantonalbank" in Binningen, the mill complex, including the small power station, in Lausen, Basel-Country, (1923) and the building complex for the salt mines in Schweizerhalle by Muttenz.

To the afore mentioned, addendum, the residential estate Wasserhaus (1920/21) in the sub-district „Neue Welt“ in Münchenstein. The Wasserhaus estate was developed by Brodtbeck concluding the original plans drawn by Prof. Hans Benno Bernoulli, Basel, (1876–1959). Due to the unique archetype nature and the prototypical neighbourhood, the Wasserhaus estate was taken up in the Swiss Inventory of Cultural Property of National and Regional Significance. Inventar der schützenswerten Ortsbilder (ISOS).

== Further Activities ==
=== Honorary Work ===
Wilhelm Brodtbeck worked 20 years in the commission for the municipality („Gemeindekommission") of Liestal and he was member of the board of management of the Basel protected historic site/landmark (Heimatschutzes).

=== Scripts ===
Wilhelm Brodtbeck also wrote poems, pageants and prose:

- "Junges Blut" Gedichte 1899, (poems dated 1899)
- "D Vermögesabgab". Zeitbilder aus der jüngsten Vergangenheit. Festspiel am Kantonalschützenfest beider Basel in Liestal 1923. (Time essays of the latest history, pageant for the festival fair featuring shooting matches of the canton Basel-Country in Liestal 1923).

== Literature ==
Schneider Max, Architekt Wilhelm Brodtbeck-Buess, 1873 bis 1957, in: Baselbieter Heimatblätter 1978, Heft 2, 304
