= Vischer =

Vischer is a surname. Notable people with the surname include:

- Vischer family of Nuremberg, a family of sculptors active in Nuremberg between 1453 and 1549
  - Hermann Vischer, the Elder (died 1487)
  - Peter Vischer the Elder (1455–1529)
  - Hermann Vischer, the Younger (1486–1517)
  - Peter Vischer the Younger (1487–1528)
  - Hans Vischer (1486-1546)
- Andreas Vischer (1877–1930), Swiss surgeon
- Benedikt Vischer (1779–1856), Swiss officer and politician
- Blanca Vischer (1915–1969), Guatemalan film actress
- Eberhard Vischer (1865–1946), Swiss theologian and church historian
- Elisabeth Vischer-Alioth (1892–1963), Swiss suffragist
- Friedrich Theodor Vischer (1807–1887), German novelist and philosopher
- Phil Vischer (born 1966), director and co-creator of VeggieTales
- Rob Vischer, President of the University of St. Thomas
- Wilhelm Vischer (philologist) (1808–1874), Swiss classical philologist
- Wilhelm Vischer (historian) (1833–1886), Swiss historian
- Wilhelm Vischer (jurist) (1861–1928), Swiss lawyer, judge and politician
- Wilhelm Vischer (botanist) (1890–1960), Swiss botanist
- Wilhelm Vischer (theologian) (1895–1988), Swiss pastor and theologian
