= Wilhelm Vischer =

Wilhelm Vischer may refer to:

- Wilhelm Vischer (botanist) (1890–1960), Swiss botanist
- Wilhelm Vischer (historian) (1833–1886), Swiss historian, son of the philologist
- Wilhelm Vischer (jurist) (1861–1928), Swiss lawyer and politician, son of the historian
- Wilhelm Vischer (philologist) (1808–1874), Swiss classical philologist
- Wilhelm Vischer (theologian) (1895–1988), Swiss theologian, grandson of the historian

== See also ==
- Wilhelm Fischer (disambiguation)
