= Albert Oeri =

Swiss editor and politician (1875–1950)

- Born: 21 September 1875; Schaffhausen, Switzerland
- Died: 22 December 1950 (aged 75); Riehen, Switzerland
- Occupations: Journalist; newspaper editor; politician
- Spouse: Hanna Preiswerk (m. 1910)
- Parents: Johann Jakob Oeri (father); Adele Oschwald (mother)
- Relatives: Andreas Vischer (brother-in-law)

Albert Oeri (21 September 1875 – 22 December 1950) was a Swiss journalist and politician. He was editor-in-chief of the Basel newspaper Basler Nachrichten from 1925 to 1949, a Liberal member of the Grand Council of Basel from 1908 to 1948 and a member of the National Council from 1931 to 1949. After 1933 he campaigned against National Socialism, and with his editorials and foreign-policy commentaries he became one of the most important representatives of the spiritual national defence (Geistige Landesverteidigung).

== Biography ==
Albert Oeri was born on 21 September 1875 in Schaffhausen, the son of Johann Jakob Oeri, a secondary school teacher (Gymnasiallehrer), and Adele Oschwald. In 1910 he married Hanna Preiswerk, from Basel. He was a brother-in-law of the surgeon Andreas Vischer.

Oeri went to school in Basel and studied classical philology and history at the universities of Basel, Göttingen and Berlin. In 1899 he obtained his doctorate at the University of Basel. In 1900–1901 he was a secondary school teacher in Gotha.

In 1901 Oeri became an editor of the Allgemeine Schweizer Zeitung. After it was merged into the Basler Nachrichten, he headed the domestic news desk there from 1902 to 1911, was head of the foreign desk from 1911 to 1925 and was editor-in-chief from 1925 to 1949.

From 1908 to 1948 Oeri was a Liberal member of the Grand Council of Basel, where among other things he chaired the committee for a new university law from 1935 to 1937. From 1931 to 1949 he was a member of the National Council. In 1934 Federal Councillor Giuseppe Motta appointed him a member of the Swiss delegation to the League of Nations, where he above all championed Switzerland's policy of neutrality.

After 1933 Oeri campaigned against National Socialism as a journalist, as a National Councillor and as a co-initiator of the Aktion Nationaler Widerstand. With his editorials and his commentaries on foreign policy, he became one of the most important representatives of the spiritual national defence (Oeri-Tagesberichte, 1946; 2nd edition 1999). At the same time, he advocated the admission of refugees and the freedom of the press and of information, and he opposed press censorship. As a result, in 1940 Oeri became a target of the Eingabe der Zweihundert (Petition of the Two Hundred), which called on the Federal Council to take tougher measures against the press and, among other things, to remove Oeri as editor-in-chief of the Basler Nachrichten.

In 1945 the University of Basel awarded Oeri an honorary doctorate in law (Dr. iur. h.c.), and the University of Bern an honorary doctorate in medicine (Dr. med. h.c.). He died in Riehen on 22 December 1950.

== Works ==
- Wann soll die Schweiz dem Völkerbund beitreten?, 1920
- Alte Front, 1933
- Sorge um Europa, edited by J. Gauss, 1977

== Bibliography ==
- Festschrift Albert Oeri, 1945
- U. Fink, Albert Oeri als Publizist und Politiker zwischen den beiden Weltkriegen, 1971
- J. Gauss, Kritische Betrachtungen Albert Oeris zur europäischen Politik seiner Zeit, 1975
- R. Teuteberg et al., Albert Oeri, 1875 bis 1950, 2002
