= Eberhard Vischer =

Swiss church historian (1865–1946)

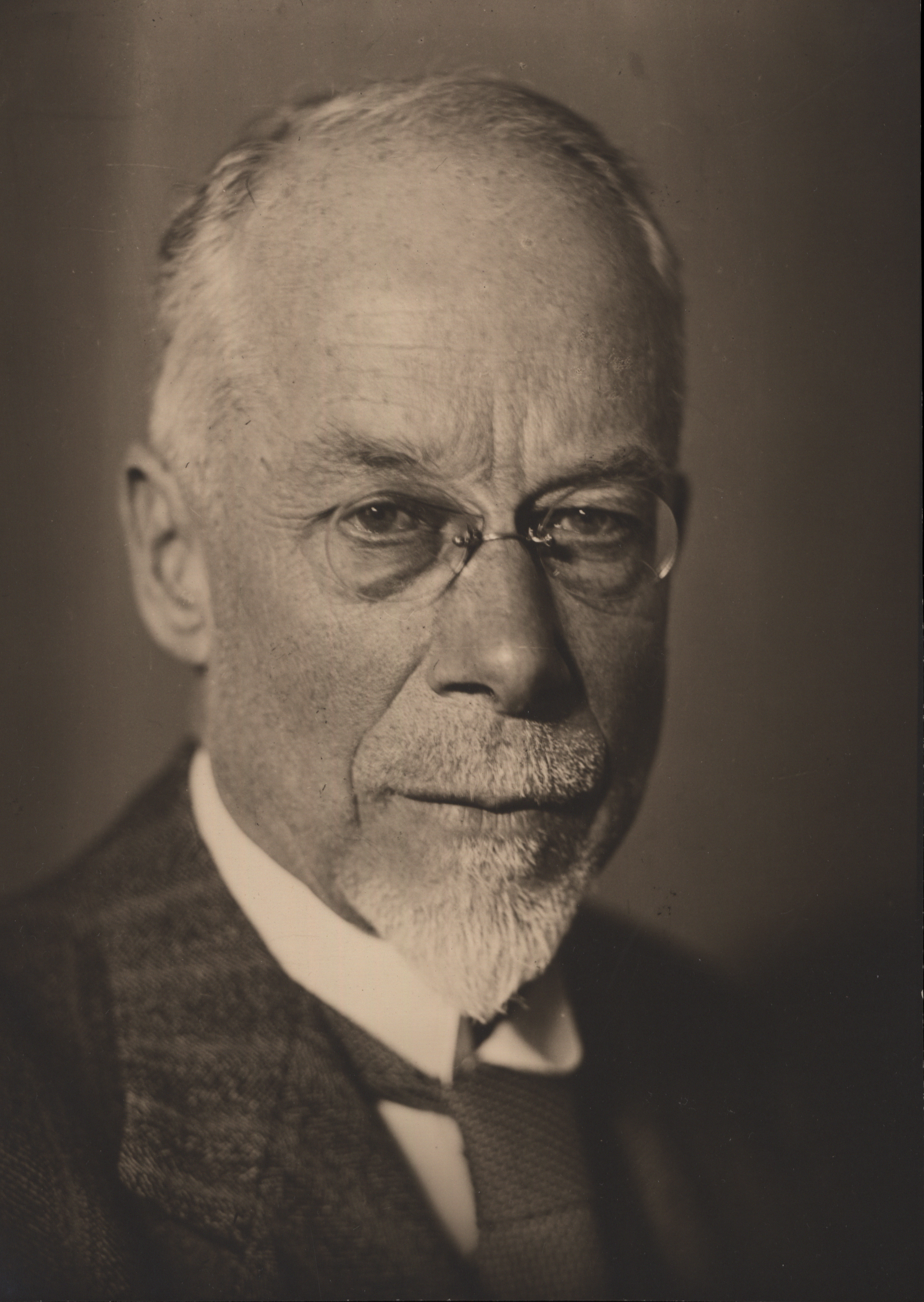
- Born: 28 May 1865; Göttingen, Kingdom of Hanover
- Died: 2 February 1946 (aged 80); Basel, Switzerland
- Occupations: Pastor; theologian; church historian
- Spouse: Valeria Koechlin (m. 1890)
- Children: Wilhelm Vischer
- Father: Wilhelm Vischer
- Relatives: Wilhelm Vischer (brother); Andreas Vischer (brother); Hanns Vischer (cousin); Elisabeth Vischer-Alioth (daughter-in-law)

Eberhard Vischer (28 May 1865 – 2 February 1946) was a Swiss theologian and church historian. After working as a pastor in Arosa and Davos, he was professor of church history and the New Testament at the University of Basel from 1907 to 1937, and its rector in 1912. He campaigned early on for women's suffrage in the church and for the admission of women theology students to the examinations.

== Biography ==
Eberhard Vischer was born on 28 May 1865 in Göttingen, the son of Wilhelm Vischer. His brothers were Wilhelm Vischer and Andreas Vischer, and Hanns Vischer was his cousin. In 1890 he married Valeria Koechlin, daughter of Samuel Eugen Koechlin, a merchant. His son was the theologian Wilhelm Vischer. Another son, Eberhard, a clerk at the Basel court of appeal, married Elisabeth Alioth in 1919.

Vischer passed the Matura at the Pädagogium in Basel, and from 1884 he studied theology in Basel, Giessen and Göttingen. He was ordained in 1888. From 1890 to 1893 he was a pastor in Arosa and from 1893 to 1895 in Davos Dorf. In 1898 he obtained his doctorate and became a Privatdozent. At the University of Basel he was associate professor (ausserordentlicher Professor) from 1902 to 1907 and full professor of church history and the New Testament from 1907 to 1937; in 1912 he was the university's rector.

Vischer was a member of the Grand Council of the canton of Basel-Stadt and, from 1904 to 1946, of the Basel church synod (Kirchensynode). From 1913 to 1943 he presided over the theological concordat examination board (Theologische Konkordatsprüfungsbehörde), and from 1923 to 1943 over the Protestant church aid society (protestantisch-kirchlicher Hilfsverein). From 1918 to 1935 he was a member of the education council (Erziehungsrat) of the canton of Basel-Stadt.

Academically, Vischer was shaped by the church historian Adolf von Harnack; in church politics he belonged to the Positiven, the orthodox wing. Early on he campaigned for women's suffrage in the church and for the admission of women theology students to the examinations. He received honorary doctorates in theology from the University of Giessen in 1904 and the University of Warsaw in 1935. He died in Basel on 2 February 1946.

== Works ==
- Das Werk der schweizerischen protestantisch-kirchlichen Hilfsvereine 1842–1942, 1944

== Bibliography ==
- Vom Wesen und Wandel der Kirche, 1935 (with a list of works)
- Eberhard Vischer, 1946

=== Archives ===
- Basel University Library: personal papers (Nachlass)
