= Christoph Ehinger =

Swiss banker and politician

Member of Grand Council of Basel-Stadt
- In office 1806–1817

Mayor of Basel
- In office 1815–1817

Personal details
- Born: Christoph Ehinger; September 30, 1755 Basel, Switzerland
- Died: April 25, 1833 (aged 77)
- Spouse: Susanna Burckhardt (m. 1788)
- Relations: Burckhardt family (by marriage)
- Children: 2
- Occupation: Banker, politician

Christoph Ehinger (September 30, 1755 – April 25, 1833) was a Swiss banker, politician and member of the Daig. Ehinger was the founder of the private bank Ehinger & Co in Basel, Switzerland in 1810. He served on the Grand Council of Basel-Stadt between 1806 and 1817. He also served as mayor of Basel.

== Life ==
Ehinger was born September 30, 1755, in Basel, Switzerland to Matthias and Anna Maria (née Weiss). The family belongs to the Daig, the well-established upper class of the city, and his father is a councilor. He completed his Matura in Basel followed by a commercial apprenticeship. He returned to Basel after a long-term stay in the Netherlands. In 1810, he founded the private bank Ehinger & Co, which still exists today and is led by descendants of Johann Ludwig Ehinger (his adopted son).

He served on the Grand Council of Basel-Stadt from 1806 to 1817 and as mayor of Basel between 1815 and 1817 (a position he never wanted to hold and was forced to do).

== Personal life ==
On August 8, 1788, Ehinger married Susanna Burckhardt (1766-1843), who was a daughter of Christoph Burckhardt and Anna Maria (née Frey). They had had one legitimate son:

- Ludwig Ehinger (1790-1809), in a relationship with Katharina Caroline Merian, no children.

They also adopted a son:

- Johann Ludwig Ehinger (né Burckhardt; 1789–1838), married Anna Katharina La Roche, seven children who bore the Ehinger name and would take-over the family bank.
