= Yvonne Jacquette =

American painter, printmaker, and educator (1934–2023)

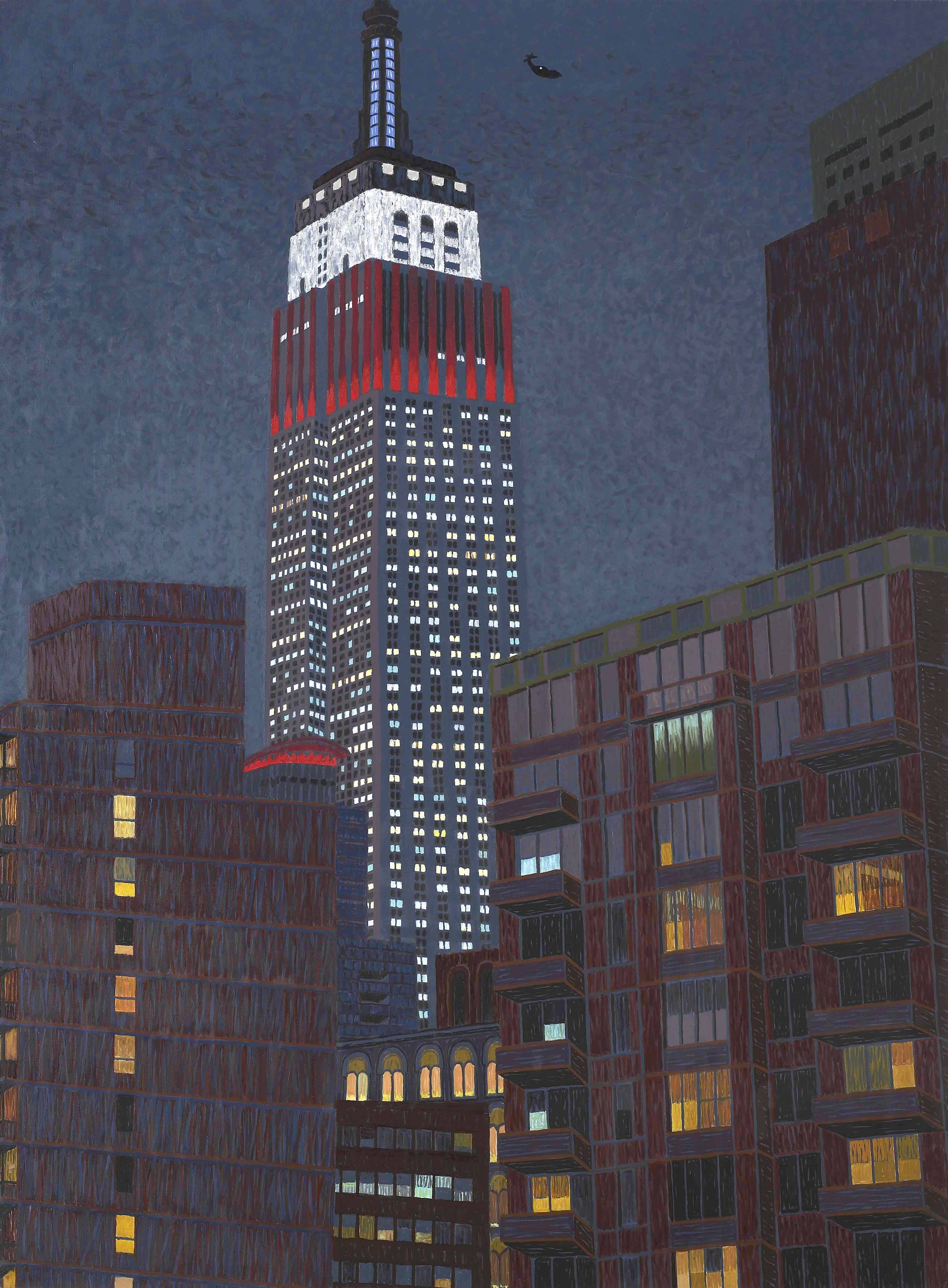
- Empire State Building II, 2009. Oil on canvas, 64 1/8 x 47 7/16 inches
- Born: Yvonne Helene Jacquette; December 15, 1934; Pittsburgh, Pennsylvania, U.S.
- Died: April 23, 2023 (aged 88); New York City, New York, U.S.
- Education: Rhode Island School of Design
- Known for: Painting, printmaking, educator
- Spouse: Rudy Burckhardt (m. 1961; died 1995)
- Children: Tom Burckhardt

Yvonne Helene Jacquette (December 15, 1934 – April 23, 2023) was an American painter, printmaker, and educator. She was known in particular for her depictions of aerial landscapes, especially her low-altitude and oblique aerial views of cities or towns, often painted using a distinctive, pointillistic technique. Through her marriage with Rudy Burckhardt, she was a member of the Burckhardt family by marriage. Her son is Tom Burckhardt.

== Early life and education ==
Yvonne Jacquette was born on December 15, 1934, in Pittsburgh, Pennsylvania, to William and Helen (née Amrhein) Jacquette. Her father was an accountant and management consultant while her mother was a homemaker. Her paternal great-grandfather, Jacques Hubert Jacquot, emigrated from Châlonvillars, France, with the name being changed upon arrival. Her maternal grandparents were both from Palatinate, Germany. She grew up in Stamford, Connecticut. She started studying art at age 10, and by 1947 she attended private instruction by traditionalist painter Robert Roché. Jacquette continued her studies at the Rhode Island School of Design (class of 1955).

== Career ==
Jacquette taught at Moore College of Art and was a visiting artist at the University of Pennsylvania from 1972 to 1976. She taught at Parsons School of Design from 1975 to 1978 and at the University of Pennsylvania from 1979 to 1984.

Her three-part mural "Autumn Expression" (1980) is in the U.S. Post Office in Bangor, Maine. According to the Smithsonian American Art Museum's online bio, Jacquette held various academic positions and was also honored by the American Academy of Arts and Letters in 1990.

In an interview with art critic John Yau in The Brooklyn Rail, Jacquette said of the way she came to begin painting aerial views:

It happened by accident, of course. I didn’t ever plan it, I was going to visit my parents who had just moved to California and I was in a plane with watercolors and I started to see that the clouds were amazing when you’re right in them.

Jacquette married Rudy Burckhardt in 1964. She was a visiting artist at the Siena Art Institute in 2012.

Jacquette lived in New York City, and died on April 23, 2023.

== Work ==
As noted in The Female Gaze, "Jacquette's works began with direct studies made with pastel on paper or photographs taken from airplanes, skyscrapers, or rented single-engine planes. She often took flights primarily to study cloud formations and aerial perspectives. She has been described as the 'Canaletto of the skies.' Her paintings are intensely colored, elaborately detailed panoramas of cities, and the countryside at various day and night. Unique views and radical angles draw attention to the act of perception, anthropomorphizing the buildings that occupy her urbanscapes."

== Awards and commissions ==
2009

- Eric Isenbeurger Annual Prize + Samuel F. B. Morse Medal, 184th Annual Exhibition of Contemporary American Art, National Academy Museum, New York, NY

2005

- Benjamin Altman Prize, National Academy Museum, New York, NY

2003

- Inducted into the American Academy of Arts & Letters, New York, NY

1999

- Mikhail and Ekaterna Shatalov Prize, National Academy Museum, New York, NY

1998

- Andrew Carnegie Prize for Painting, National Academy Museum, New York, NY

1998-97

- Guggenheim Foundation Grant for Painting

1994

- Print Commission, Business Committee for the Arts

1993

- Print Commission, Zimmerli Museum, Rutgers University, New Brunswick, NJ

1990

- Painters Award, American Academy of Arts and Letters, New York

1988

- Elected into the National Academy of Design

1979-82

- Mural Commission, Federal Building and Post Office, Bangor, Maine, (G.S.A. Project)

1976

- Ingram Merrill Award for Painting

== Solo exhibitions ==
2010

- “Yvonne Jacquette, Aerials: Paintings, Prints, Pastels,” Center for Maine Contemporary Art, Rockport, ME
- “Yvonne Jacquette,” DC Moore Gallery, New York, NY

2009-10

- “Yvonne Jacquette: The Complete Woodcuts, 1987–2009,” Mary Ryan Gallery, New York, NY; Springfield Art Museum, Springfield, MO.

2008

- “Picturing New York: Nocturnes by Yvonne Jacquette,” Museum of the City of New York, New York, NY
- “Yvonne Jacquette,” DC Moore Gallery, New York, NY

2006

- “Yvonne Jacquette: Arrivals and Departures,” DC Moore Gallery, New York, NY

2005

- “Yvonne Jacquette: Paintings and Works on Paper,” Springfield Art Museum, Springfield, MO

2003

- DC Moore Gallery, New York, NY

2002–2003

- “Aerial Muse: The Art of Yvonne Jacquette,” Cantor Arts Center at Stanford University, California; Colby College Museum of Art at Waterville, Maine; Utah Museum of Fine Arts at Salt Lake City, Utah; Hudson River Museum at Yonkers, New York

2000

- “Yvonne Jacquette - Evening: Chicago and New York,” DC Moore Gallery, New York, NY

1998

- “Yvonne Jacquette: Maine Aerials,” Art Gallery, University of Southern Maine, Gorham, ME
- “Paintings and Works on Paper by Yvonne Jacquette,” Hollins Art Gallery, Hollins College, Roanoke, VA

1997

- “Yvonne Jacquette: Vantage on High,” DC Moore Gallery, New York, NY

1996

- “Yvonne Jacquette Frescoes,” Caldbeck Gallery, Rockland, ME

1995

- “Yvonne Jacquette: Paintings and Pastels, 1992-1994,” Brooke Alexander, New York, NY

1992

- “Yvonne Jacquette: Frescoes, Monotypes, Pastels and Prints,” Brooke Alexander Gallery, New York, NY

1991

- “Yvonne Jacquette: Aerial Views, Rudy Burckhardt: Photographs,” Jewett Hall Gallery, The University of Maine at Augusta, Augusta, ME
- “Yvonne Jacquette,” Elizabeth Galasso Fine Art Leasing, Ossining, NY

1990

- “Drawings and Monotypes,” O’Farrell Gallery, Brunswick, ME
- “Paintings, Frescoes, Pastels 1988-1990,” John Berggruen Gallery, San Francisco, CA; Brooke Alexander, New York, NY

1988

- “Looking Down: Prints by Yvonne Jacquette,” Joe and Emily Lowe Art Gallery, Syracuse University, Syracuse, NY
- “Yvonne Jacquette: Paintings and Pastels: New York Triptychs,” Brooke Alexander, New York, NY

1986

- “Yvonne Jacquette, Tokyo Nightviews,” Brooke Alexander, New York, NY; Bowdoin College Museum of Art, Brunswick, ME
- “Yvonne Jacquette: Works on Paper,” Barbara Kraków Gallery, Boston, MA

1985

- “Yvonne Jacquette,” Yurakucho Seibu/Takanawa Art, Tokyo, Japan

1984

- “Yvonne Jacquette: Recent Paintings and Works on Paper,” John Berggruen Gallery, San Francisco, CA

1983

- “Currents 22. Yvonne Jacquette: Recent Drawings and Pastels,” St. Louis Art Museum, St. Louis, MO
- “Yvonne Jacquette: Drawings and Pastels 1982-83,” Brooke Alexander, New York, NY

1982

- “Yvonne Jacquette: Paintings and Drawings,” Brooke Alexander, New York, NY

1981

- “Yvonne Jacquette: Paintings and Pastels,” Brooke Alexander, New York, NY

1979

- “Yvonne Jacquette: The Night Paintings,” Brooke Alexander, New York, NY

1976

- “Yvonne Jacquette: Paintings, Drawings and Monotypes,” Brooke Alexander, New York, NY

1974

- “Yvonne Jacquette: 22nd Street,” Brooke Alexander, New York, NY
- “Yvonne Jacquette: Paintings,” Fischbach Gallery, New York, NY

1972

- Tyler School of Art, Philadelphia, PA
- Fischbach Gallery, New York, NY

1971

- “Yvonne Jacquette: Recent Paintings,” Fischbach Gallery, New York, NY

1965

- Swarthmore College, Swarthmore, PA

== Public collections ==
- Arnot Art Museum, Elmira, NY
- Bowdoin College Museum of Art, Brunswick, ME
- Brooklyn Museum, Brooklyn, New York City, New York
- The Cleveland Museum of Art, Cleveland, OH
- Colby College Museum of Art, Waterville, ME
- The Columbus Museum of Art, Columbus, GA
- The Columbus Museum of Art, Columbus, OH
- Concordia College, Seward, NE
- The Delaware Art Museum, Wilmington, DE
- Farnsworth Museum & Library, Rockland, ME
- Fine Arts Museums of San Francisco (FAMSF), San Francisco, California
- Harn Museum of Art, University of Florida, Gainesville, FL
- Herbert F. Johnson Museum of Art, Cornell University, Ithaca, NY
- Hirshhorn Museum and Sculpture Garden, Washington, DC
- Iris and B. Gerald Cantor Center for Visual Arts, Stanford University, Stanford, CA
- Library of Congress, Washington, DC
- McNay Art Museum, San Antonio, Texas
- Metropolitan Museum of Art, New York City, New York
- Miami Art Museum, Miami, FL
- Minneapolis Institute of Arts, Minneapolis, MN
- Museum of Art, Carnegie Institute, Pittsburgh, PA
- Museum of Fine Arts in Santa Fe, Lucy Lippard Collection, Santa Fe, NM
- Museum of Modern Art (MoMA), New York City, New York
- Museum of the City of New York, New York, NY
- New Orleans Museum of Art, New Orleans, LA
- The New York Historical Society, New York, NY
- North Carolina Museum of Art, Raleigh, North Carolina
- Ohio State University, Athens, OH
- Palmer Museum of Art at Penn State, University Park, Pennsylvania
- Pennsylvania Academy of the Fine Arts, Philadelphia, PA
- Philadelphia Museum of Art, Philadelphia, PA
- Portland Museum of Art, Portland, Maine
- Rhode Island School of Design Museum, Providence, Rhode Island
- Rutgers University, New Brunswick, NJ
- The Saint Louis Art Museum, Saint Louis, MO
- Smithsonian American Art Museum, Washington, D.C.
- Springfield Art Museum, Spring Field, MO
- Staatliche Museum, Berlin, Germany
- University of Iowa Museum of Art, Iowa City, IA
- Weatherspoon Art Gallery, Greensboro, NC
- Whitney Museum of American Art, New York City, New York
- Wichita Art Museum, Wichita, KS
- Yale University Art Gallery, New Haven, CT

== Personal life ==
In 1961, she married fellow painter Rudy Burckhardt, who was recently divorced and had one son. They had another son, Tom Burckhardt, in 1964. Jacquette died on April 23, 2023, aged 88 in New York City.

== See also ==
- Landscape art
- Aerial landscape art
- Cityscape
