= Burckhardt family =

Family from Basel, Switzerland

Burckhardt family (de) Bourcard
- Patrician family
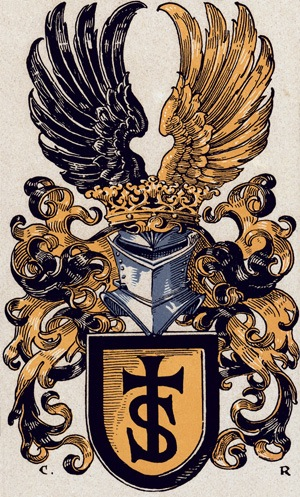
- Burckhardt family coat of arms
- Etymology: derived from German given name Burkhard
- Place of origin: Basel, Switzerland
- Founded: Taking municipal citizenship 1523, Basel, Switzerland; 503 years ago
- Founder: Christoph-dit-Stoffel Burckhardt (1490–1548)
- Titles: Grand Councilor; National Councilor

The Burckhardt family is a Swiss family of the Basel patriciate, descended from Christoph (Stoffel) Burckhardt (1490–1578), a merchant in cloth and silk, who originally emigrated from Münstertal, Black Forest, received Basel citizenship in 1523, and became a member of the Grand Council of Basel-Stadt in the Old Swiss Confederacy in 1553.

The family was represented in the Grand Council continuously from 1553 until the 20th century. In the 17th century and early 18th century, the family was the most powerful family of the canton of Basel. Branches of the family were based in Nantes and in the Kingdom of Naples from the 18th century, where it was ennobled as de Bourcard. The family's famous members include the traveller and orientalist Johann Ludwig Burckhardt, the influential art historian Jacob Burckhardt and the international President of the Red Cross Carl Jacob Burckhardt. The surname is derived from the Germanic dithematic name Burkhard, from burg "protection" and hard "brave, hardy".

== Coat of Arms ==
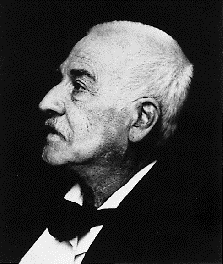
The cultural and art historian Jacob Burckhardt

The Burckhardt coat-of-arms has a shield of yellow background with a black S intertwined with a cross (the “S” is perhaps for Seidenkrämer - silk-merchant), which is surmounted by a crowned helmet with a fluttering black and yellow flag. The original crest was simpler and consisted only of a shield with the S intertwined with the cross. It was modified between 1558 and 1578.

== Original Lineage ==
Christoph Burckhardt married Ottilie Mechler in 1518 and in 1539 Gertrud Brand, daughter of Basel mayor Theodor Brand. There are six lines of the Burckhardt family, from the six sons born of Christoph's second marriage:

1. Bernhard: line extinct in the 17th century
2. Hieronymus:
3. Theodor:
4. Johann Rudolf
5. Samuel:
6. Daniel

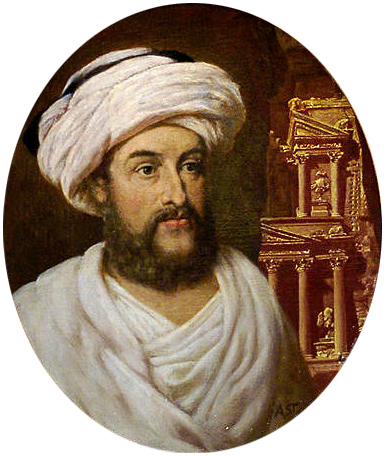
The orientalist Johann Ludwig Burckhardt

Of the six sons, five became merchants in cloth and silk, while Hieronymus entered the Teutonic Order.

In the 17th and 18th century, the Burckhardts intermarried with the other leading families of the Basel patriciate (Iselin, Merian, Sarasin, Staehelin, Vischer, Von der Mühll, Wettstein). Bernhard was elected to the great chamber of the city council in 1603, where the family remained present until 1878. The family reaches the peak of its political influence in the 18th century, but continues to be influential in the 19th century with several Burckhardt mayors and professors at the University of Basel. Prior to 1798, seven members of the family were burgomasters of Basel, and also in the 19th century, four Burckhardt family members were burgomasters.

The family also appears under the name Byrkit, Byrkett and Burket (its pronunciation in the Basel dialect) in the US. A member of this lineage, Jacob F. Burket, was a member on the Supreme Court of Ohio from 1893 to 1904.

== Gallery ==
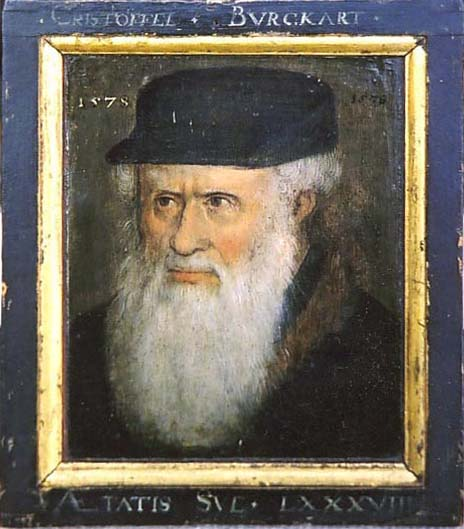
Christoph Burckhardt (1490–1578)

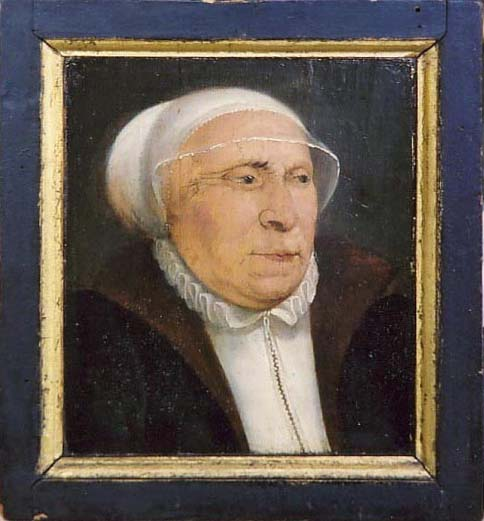
Gertrud Burckhardt née Brand (1516–1600), daughter of Burgomaster of Basel Theodor Brand (1488–1558) and wife of Christoph Burckhardt (1490–1578)

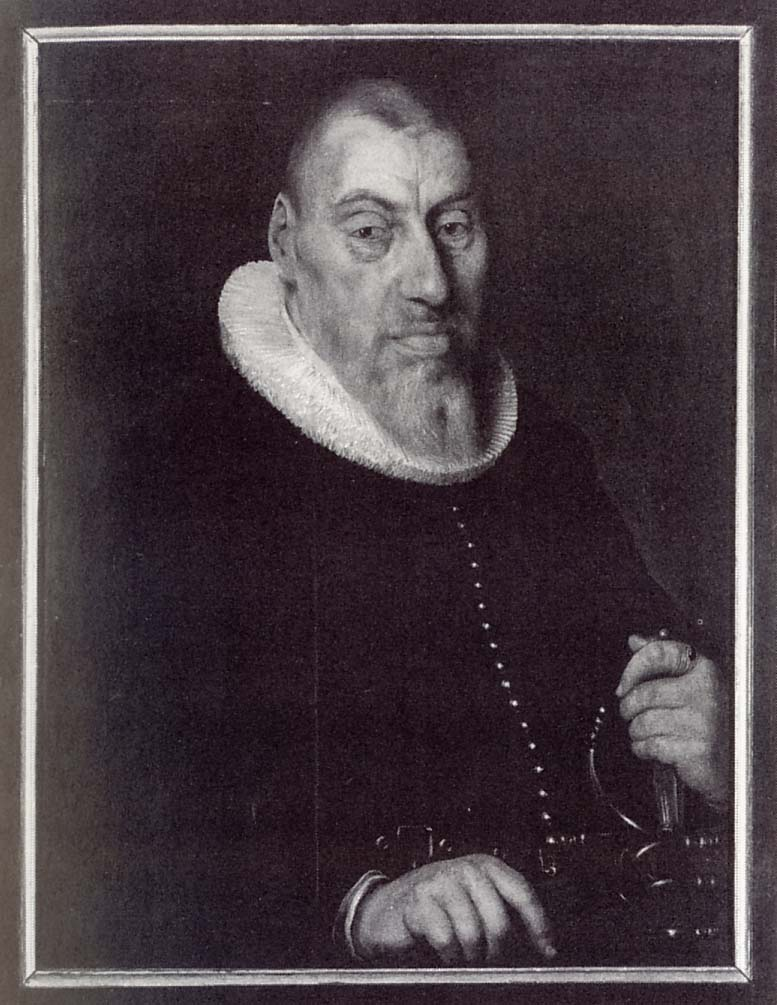
Theodor Burckhardt (1549–1623), son of Christoph Burckhardt (1490–1578) and Gertrud Brand (1516–1600)

== Notable family members ==
- Christoph Burkhardt (1740–1812), Swiss merchant involved in international trade and slave trade
- Jacob Burckhardt (1818–1897), Swiss historian of art and culture, author of "The Culture of the Renaissance"
- Johann Ludwig Burckhardt (a.k.a. Sheik Ibrahim), 1784–1817, Swiss traveler and orientalist who re-discovered the ancient city of Petra
- Carl Jacob Burckhardt, Swiss diplomat and President of the Red Cross
- Gottlieb Burckhardt, 1836–1907, Swiss psychiatrist and founder of modern psychosurgery
- Titus Burckhardt, 1908–1984, Swiss author member of the Traditionalist School
- Rudy Burckhardt, 1914–1999, Swiss-American filmmaker and photographer
- Martin Burckhardt (1921-2007), Swiss architect, politician and patron of the arts
- Tom Burckhardt (born 1964), American artist
