= Wilhelm Vischer (jurist) =

Swiss lawyer and politician (1861–1928)

- Born: 24 February 1861; Basel, Switzerland
- Died: 26 January 1928 (aged 66); Basel, Switzerland
- Occupations: Lawyer; notary; judge; politician
- Spouse: Helene Iselin (m. 1889)
- Father: Wilhelm Vischer
- Relatives: Eberhard Vischer (brother); Andreas Vischer (brother); Hanns Vischer (cousin)

Wilhelm Vischer (24 February 1861 – 26 January 1928) was a Swiss lawyer, judge and politician from Basel. He was a member of the Grand Council of Basel from 1892 to 1928, and its president in 1898–1899, and for some years he was president of the Swiss Liberal Party. He also wrote works on Basel in the Restoration period and on the history of the University of Basel.

== Biography ==
Wilhelm Vischer was born on 24 February 1861 in Basel, the son of Wilhelm Vischer. His brothers were Eberhard Vischer and Andreas Vischer, and Hanns Vischer was his cousin. In 1889 he married Helene Iselin, daughter of Heinrich Iselin, a physician.

Vischer studied law in Basel, Göttingen and Pisa, and obtained his doctorate in Basel in 1886. He then spent some time in England. From 1888 he worked as a lawyer and notary in a law firm. From 1903 to 1916 he was a judge at the criminal court, and from 1925 at the court of appeal. He was president of the Basel chamber of notaries (Basler Notariatskammer).

From 1892 to 1928 Vischer was a member of the Grand Council of Basel, which he presided over in 1898–1899. For some years he was also president of the Swiss Liberal Party. Interested in social policy, he was active among other things from 1894 in the Protestant workers' association (evangelischer Arbeiterverein).

Vischer wrote Basel in der Zeit der Restauration (two parts, 1905–1906) and Die Basler Universität seit ihrer Gründung (1911), and from 1903 he presided for many years over the commission of the Historical Museum. In 1905 he was a member of the board of directors (Verwaltungsrat) of the Basellandschaftliche Hypothekenbank, and from 1913 he was its president. From 1926 to 1928 he was president of the council (Gesellschaftsrat) of the Swiss Historical Research Society (Schweizerische Geschichtforschende Gesellschaft). He died in Basel on 26 January 1928.

== Works ==
- Basel in der Zeit der Restauration, 2 parts, 1905–1906
- Die Basler Universität seit ihrer Gründung, 1911

== Bibliography ==
- E. Vischer, "Wilhelm Vischer", in Basler Jahrbuch, 1929, 1–12

=== Archives ===
- Basel-Stadt State Archives (Staatsarchiv Basel-Stadt), Basel: personal papers (Nachlass)
