= 2008 Basel-Stadt Grand Council election =

The Grand Council of Basel-Stadt election was held on 14 September 2008. It was the first election under the new constitution and a therefore smaller Grand Council of only 100 representatives instead of 130. Because of that all existing parties lost ground, particularly the Social Democratic Party. The Swiss People's Party (SVP) and the Green Party both did relatively well. The Green Liberal Party entered the Grand Council with 5 representatives.

== Results ==
Summary of the 14 September 2008 Basel-Stadt Grand Council election results
Party	Ideology	Vote %^{1}	Vote % ±	Seats	Seats ±
Social Democratic Party	Social democracy	29.7	−3.1	32	−14
Swiss People's Party	National conservatism	13.7	+1.7	14	−1
Green Party	Green politics	13.8	+2.3	13	−3
Free Democratic Party	Classical liberalism	9.9	−1.8	11	−6
Liberal Party	Classical liberalism	8.4	+0.4	9	−3
Christian Democratic People's Party	Christian democracy	9.3	+1.1	8	−3
Green Liberal Party	Green liberalism	5.1	N/A	5	N/A
Evangelical People's Party	Christian democracy	4.4	−0.1	4	−2
Democratic Social Party	Social democracy	3.1	−1.5	3	−3
Active Bettingen	Liberalism	N/A	N/A	1	±0
Swiss Democrats—Federal Democratic Union		2.4	−0.8	0	±0
Homosexual List		0.2	N/A	0	N/A
Total		100.00	–	100	−30
^{1} Excludes Bettingen, which was contested only by Active Bettingen.
Source: Canton of Basel-Stadt
