= 2016 Basel-Stadt Grand Council election =

2016 Grand Council election
← 2012	23 October 2016	2020 →

All 100 seats in the Grand Council of Basel-Stadt (51 seats needed for a majority)
	First party	Second party	Third party
Leader	Brigitte Hollinger	Sebastian Frehner	Patricia von Falkenstein
Party	Social Democrats	Swiss People's	Liberals
Last election	33 seats, 30.7%	15 seats, 15%	10 seats, 9.6%
Seats before	33	15	10
Seats won	34	15	14
Seat change	▲1	Steady	▲4
Percentage	32.5%	14.3%	13.8%
Swing	▲1.8pp	▼0.7pp	▲4.2pp
	Fourth party	Fifth party	Sixth party
Leader	Mück / Zürcher (BastA!), Ackermann / Friedl (Greens)	Luca Urgese	Andrea Strahm
Party	Greens	FDP.The Liberals	Christian Democrats
Last election	13 seats, 11.8%	12 seats, 11.1%	8 seats, 7.3%
Seats before	13	12	8
Seats won	14	10	7
Seat change	▲1	▼2	▼1
Percentage	13.4%	9.2%	5.9%
Swing	▲1.6pp	▼1.9pp	▼1.4pp
	Seventh party	Eighth party	Ninth party
Leader	Katja Christ	Beatrice Mahler	Gabriella Ess Dahinden
Party	Green Liberals	Evangelical People's	Active Bettingen
Last election	5 seats, 5.0%	1, 1.4%	1, 0.7%
Seats before	5	1	1
Seats won	4	1	1
Seat change	▼1	Steady	Steady
Percentage	4.3%	1.4%	0.7%
Swing	▼0.7pp	Steady	Steady

Elections to the Grand Council of Basel-Stadt were held on 23 October 2016. The big winners were the Liberal Party of Basel-Stadt, who increased their popular vote from 9.6% in 2012 to 13.8% and gaining four additional seats. Both centre-left parties, the Social Democrats and the Green Party also gained ground and won one additional seat each. The losers of the elections were the centrist Christian Democratic People's Party, which lost one seat, the Green Liberal Party who lost one seat and the FDP who lost two seats; the right-wing anti-immigration party "Volksaktion" lost both of their seats.

== Opinion polls ==
Date	Institution	SPS	SVP	GPS	FDP	LDP	CVP	GLP	EVP	Other	Lead
23 October 2016	Grand council election, 2016	32.5%	14.3%	13.4%	9.2%	13.8%	5.9%	4.3%	1.4%	5.2%	18.2%
14 October 2016	Tageswoche/bzBasel	30.4%	17.4%	10.6%	10.4%	12.8%	6.5%	4.5%	3.9%	3.5%	13.0%
9 September 2016	Tageswoche/bzBasel	30.3%	16.9%	10.3%	11.5%	12.8%	6.9%	3.8%	3.9%	3.6%	13.4%
28 October 2012	Grand council election, 2012	30.7%	15%	11.8%	11.1%	9.6%	7.3%	5.0%	4.2%	5.3%	15.7%
