= Edith Schloss =

American painter (1919–2011)

- Schloss, c. 1947
- Born: Edith Lina Schloss; July 20, 1919; Offenbach, Weimar Republic (now Germany)
- Died: December 21, 2011 (aged 92); Rome, Italy
- Other name: Edith Schloss-Burckhardt
- Known for: Artist
- Spouse: Rudy Burckhardt (m. 1947; div. 1961)
- Children: 1
- Website: Official website

Edith Schloss (July 20, 1919 – December 21, 2011) was a German-born American artist, art critic and author, primarily known for abstract paintings and assemblages. She received art training first in her native Offenbach, Germany, and then, successively, in Florence, London, Boston, and New York. She spent the early part of her career working during the cold months in Manhattan and during the warm ones in coastal New England and then spent the last five decades of her life in Italy where she wintered in Rome and painted during the rest of the year in Liguria or Tuscany. While living in Italy she collaborated with the avant-garde composer Alvin Curran who later became her partner and lifelong friend.

Schloss's paintings were mostly small landscapes and still lifes in oil or watercolor. In 1947 a critic for Art News called her paintings "light-hearted abstractions" and in 1974 a critic for the New York Times described her watercolors as having a "general aura of poetic fantasy" She also made small boxes with found-object contents. in a review published in Arts Magazine In 1974, a critic described her boxes as "genuinely artless, neither rarefied nor precious".

== Early life and training ==
Schloss was born in Offenbach am Main, Germany, on July 20, 1919, the first-born child in a prosperous Jewish family. Her parents were Ludwig and Martha Schloss. As a child she attended a local Volksschule and also received avant-garde art education in a class run by a man who taught collage but did not, as she later recalled, ever show his students how to draw or paint. When she was eleven years old her family sent her for language instruction to a boarding school for girls in Nancy, France. At about this time she also spent time as a student in a vocational school in Frankfurt where she later remembered seeing Van Gogh's portrait of Doctor Paul Gachet at the Städel art museum. By 1936, as the persecution of German Jews kept her from further study in Germany, her parents sent her to Italy where she worked as an au pair and studied art with her employer, Professoressa Teresita Baldi. Recalling this period she later wrote, "The Uffizi was full of the best fairy tales on earth ... what teenager is not moved by the cool tones and gentle stillness of the Primavera and The Birth of Venus?"

Late in 1938 she left Fascist Italy for England. Then aged 19, she no longer received parental support, had little money, and possessed no more than could fit into one small suitcase. Her ability to travel had been restricted when Germany had invalidated all Jewish passports earlier that year. Determining that she would not return to Germany, Schloss found that she could enter the United Kingdom as a refugee. Arriving in London, she was taken in by a small group of self-exiled German socialists and, in return for room and board, helped its members prepare and distribute their publications. Soon thereafter she found employment, again as an au pair, working for a family in Shrewsbury. At that time she took classes in drawing nudes at the Shrewsbury Technical College. She later moved back to London where she found work minding the children of the German-born illustrator, Walter Trier, and found time to attend art classes and visit museums. She chafed under restrictions the UK government imposed on her as a stateless woman, and in the summer of 1940 obtained support from the American Friends Service Committee to obtain one of the relatively few U.S. immigration visas available to Jews fleeing Germany. Departing from Liverpool on the RMS Antonia, she arrived in Quebec City on September 28 and crossed to the U.S. at St. Albans, Vermont, traveling from there to Boston where she found work as a waitress to support herself while taking classes at the Boston School of Practical Art. While living in Boston she met and began living with another German refugee, Heinz Langerhans. A revolutionary socialist whose views aligned with the group that had helped Schloss in London, Langerhans introduced her to other similarly aligned self-exiled Germans. In 1942 the pair moved to Manhattan, finding apartments successively in Brooklyn and the Upper West Side of Manhattan. In New York she studied at the New School for Social Research and attended lectures at Cooper Union while earning a living in a sequence of jobs in factories, newspapers, a photoengraving business, and again in a restaurant. She also enrolled at the Art Students League, because, as she later said, “anyone who wanted to be anyone” was studying there. At the League her teachers included Harry Sternberg, Will Barnet, Morris Kantor, and John Groth. She later said she learned most from Sternberg who once told her, "Never wait for that famous inspiration. Just go on steadily every day and you’ll get there." On another occasion he said, "Paint the sky red if you see it that way. Dare anything."

By 1944 Schloss and Langerhans were no longer living together. That year she moved into a loft in the Chelsea neighborhood of Manhattan at 116 West 21st Street. The loft's previous tenant was a friend, the photographer Ellen Auerbach. Living nearby were artists Willem and Elaine de Kooning, Nell Blaine, and Jane Freilicher as were a filmmaker, Rudy Burckhardt and two poets, Edwin Denby and James Schuyler. Although he lived elsewhere, the painter Fairfield Porter had a studio on the same block. Porter, who shared socialist views with Langerhans, provided a bridge for Schloss between self-exiled Germans like Langerhans, and the bohemian art world in which Porter moved. A few months after she met Porter he brought her to Willem de Kooning's studio where she met him for the first time. Schloss later wrote about the encounter, saying the experience convinced her to change her approach to painting. In her words, she, "stopped looking out and tried to scoop shapes and colors from within myself."

== Career in art ==
Schloss completed her studies at the Art Students League in 1946 and somewhat tentatively settled into a career in art. In her memoir she said at this time she sometimes saw herself as a painter and other times as a writer. Despite this ambivalence she devoted much time and effort to her art. From the mid-1940s through the next six decades her work would appear in 40 solo exhibitions and some 50 group shows. In August 1946 she participated in her first exhibition, a large annual held by Gloucester Society of Artists in Gloucester, Massachusetts. Reviewing the exhibition, a critic for ARTnews cited her contributions as outstanding. In the fall of 1946 her work appeared in a show organized by an artists' collective called the Jane Street Group. In 1944 Schloss's friend Nell Blaine had become a founding member of the group and on her advice Schloss joined about a year later. Other members included Hyde Solomon, Leland Bell, Louisa Matthíasdóttir, Albert Kresch, and Judith Rothschild. In December, when she participated in an exhibition held at the New York gallery run by the art teacher and abstract artist Carl Ashby, a critic for Art Digest called a painting of hers "appealing both in its surface technique and subject matter". The following year she was given a duo exhibition with her friend Cicely Aikman at the Ashby Gallery. Writing in the New York Times, critic Howard Devree praised a semi-abstract painting called "West Twenty-first Street" but was less enthusiastic about her non-objective work. Overall he found her paintings to be "earnest and vigorous". Reviewing this show, an ARTnews critic described her paintings as "light-hearted abstractions". In 1951 Schloss participated in the watershed 9th Street Art Exhibition. The show included painting and sculpture by 72 artists, including many of her friends from The Club, a group of like-minded artists formed in 1949. Although Schloss and quite a few other participants were not themselves abstract expressionists, others, like the de Koonings, were forerunners of that art movement.

In the late 1940s and early 1950s she participated in duo and trio shows held by an artists' collective called the Pyramid Group. The artists in that group were mostly young and unknown and mostly associated with the Ashby Gallery. In addition to Schloss members included Cicely Aikman, Helen DeMott, Hyde Solomon, Paul Breslin, Al Blaustein, and Gordon Rothenberg. In 1949 an ARTnews critic drew attention to a painting of hers called "Between the World and the Weather" in a Pyramid Group show at the Riverside Museum, describing it as "a lyric abstraction". A 1955 duo exhibition that Schloss held with another Pyramid artist at the Hudson Guild drew favorable comments from a critic for Art Digest. Calling her work "simply and beautifully executed", the critic discussed elements of her style including its "feminine quality" and "delicate but firm handling".

In the early 1950s Schloss also began to participate in exhibitions at an artists' co-op called the Tanager Gallery. She continued her relationship with the Tanager until 1961. In that year a trio exhibition at Tanager with Lawrence Campbell and Gabriel Laderman drew an extensive review in ARTnews. Praising Schloss's "refreshing audacity", the ARTnews critic said the paintings had a "fidelity to form" and "an hypnotic visual allure", adding that they were "beautiful in a unique way". At this time she also began exhibiting with the American Abstract Artists group and continued to do so for the next few years. She made her first appearances in commercial galleries in 1956 when she participated in group shows at the Poindexter and the Kraushaar galleries. In 1959 she was given a solo exhibition at Constance Kane's Workshop Gallery where she showed small wooden boxes along with her paintings. This was probably her first solo in a commercial gallery. In reviewing it, a critic for Art Digest called her still lifes "tastefully decorative, sincere and pleasantly reminiscent of Chardin". The following year she mounted a solo exhibition at the Tanager Gallery and, with her friend Helen DeMott, organized a group exhibition called "American Still Life Painting Today" for a commercial gallery, the Peridot. Art Digest's critic said the two women had made excellent choices and Dore Ashton, in the New York Times, called Schloss's paintings "noteworthy". In 1961 Schloss participated in a major exhibition that was later understood to place assemblage as a significant artistic medium. The show contained 250 works by 150 artists dating from 1913. It attracted a good deal of critical attention including a review in the issue of Life magazine for October 20 of that year. A review by John Canaday of the New York Times used the terms "dazzler" and "spectacular" to describe it. One of the two box constructions that Schloss exhibited was pictured in the show's exhibition catalog.

In 1947 Schloss had married Rudy Burckhardt. In 1962 she separated from him and sailed to Italy with their twelve-year-old son Jacob. At first intending to travel for a few months, she eventually settled in Rome and retained it as her home base for the rest of her life. Most years, she would spend the warm months painting in Liguria or Tuscany and return to Rome during the colder ones. The Galleria Aleph in Rome gave her a solo exhibition of assemblages in 1964. A critic for a Rome paper called it the most entertaining of the city's current exhibitions. A year later the Galleria Scorpio, also in Rome, gave her a solo show of paintings in oil and watercolor. During the next 20 years she was given more than a dozen solo exhibitions in commercial galleries in Rome and other Italian cities. She also continued to send paintings and assemblages for exhibition in New York. These shows included solos at the Green Mountain Gallery (1970, 1972, 1974) and at the Ingber Gallery (1974, 1975, 1977, 1979, 1981, 1983, 1985, 1987, 1989). A review in Arts Magazine said her watercolors in the 1974 Ingber exhibition were "delightful in their spontaneity".

In 1966 she contributed watercolors to an event called a "sonic portrait of the city of Rome". This was the first of a number of collaborations with the avant-garde composer Alvin Curran who later became her partner and lifelong friend. She was given her last solo exhibition at the Ingber Gallery in 1989. She continued to be given solo exhibitions in Rome during the first decade of the 21st century. A 1997 show at the high school in Rome from which her son had graduated was probably the first solo exhibition following her death. In 2015 the Sundaram Tagore Gallery in New York staged what was said to be the most comprehensive display of her work to date. Three years later Meredith Ward Fine Art mounted a retrospective focusing on her work of the 1960s and 1970s. Reviewing this show, Roberta Smith wrote in the New York Times, "At this point in her life, Schloss painted with consummate ease and abundant charm, sketching her subjects and applying color as needed." In 2022 Alexanre Gallery mounted a show that included works by artists who were her friends along with her own works. In 2023 one writer showed that the response to Schloss's work was not uniformly positive, writing, "Schloss was a good but not great painter. Today her work is of interest primarily for how she melded the influences of the two artists she most admired, Porter and Willem de Kooning."

=== Collaborations with Alvin Curran ===
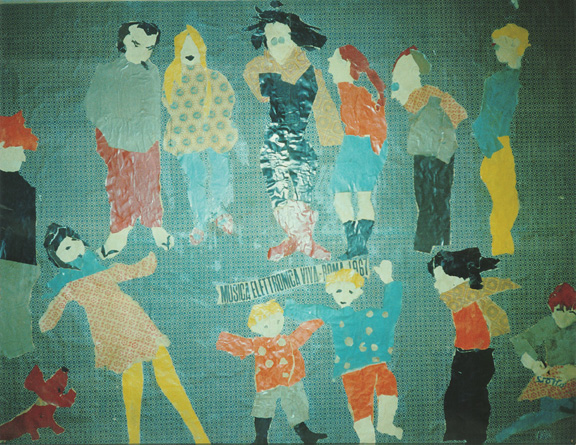
Edith Schloss, Poster for a Concert by Musica Elettronica Viva, 1967

Not long after she settled in New York her friends Rudy Burckhardt and Edwin Denby introduced Schloss to some of the city's avant-garde musicians including John Cage, Paul Bowles, and Elliott Carter. She remained close to Carter and his wife Helen for many years thereafter. In 1962 he was named composer in residence at the American Academy in Rome and, since Schloss was then also living in that city, they met one another's friends and acquaintances. In one of these meetings Schloss was introduced to a student of Carter's named Alvin Curran. Curran had come to Rome in 1964 and two years later, with other expatriate American musicians and composers, had co-founded an intensely democratic improvisational musical collective called Musica Elettronica Viva, or MEV. Soon after they met, Schloss and Curran became lovers and lived together for the next 20 years, remaining friends even after they split up. They were also artistic collaborators. She made posters for MEV's concerts and cover art for the albums they produced. A poster she created for a 1967 MEV concert held in Rome is shown above. On occasion, she provided voice and instrumentals (on Jew's harp) in their performances. In 1969 Schloss profiled the group in an article that appeared in The Village Voice. She wrote that the group's performances united "player and listener ... so that even if you don’t take part with an instrument, or dance, or sing, you are always on the verge of doing so. You can’t remain passive." In her posthumous memoir Schloss wrote of MEV that, "in the thick of the spirit of the revolutionary 1960s, they understood music as political action and attack."

In addition to her work with MEV she paired with Curran in events that combined his music with her paintings. For example, in 1965 the two collaborated in a presentation called "Watercolor Music" at St. Paul's Within the Walls in Rome. She made stage sets for Curran's concerts. A joint exhibition of their work opened at La Casa delle Letterature in Rome the day after she died in 2011. In 2015 Curran spoke of his collaboration with Schloss in a video recording made during the solo exhibition of her paintings held that year in New York's Sundaram Tagore Gallery. He said they were able to meld together the quite distinct disciplines in which they worked, each inspiring the other. He also said Schloss approached her work with few preconceptions and was little influenced by the styles or techniques of art that happened to be in demand at any time.

=== Artistic style ===
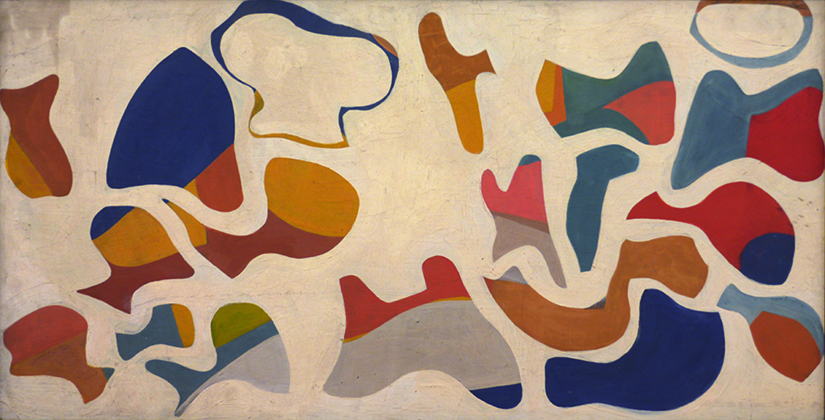
(2) Edith Schloss, Games, 1947, oil on panel, 11 7/8 x 22 1/2 inches

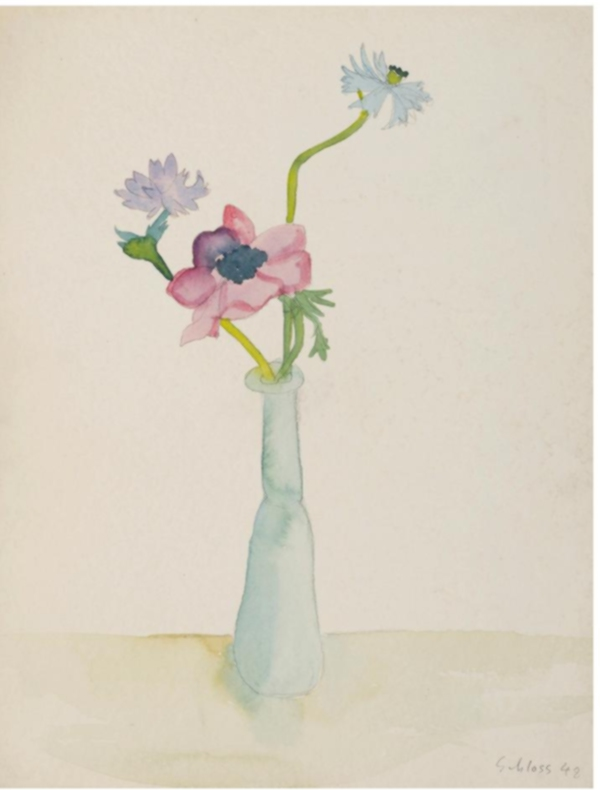
(3) Edith Schloss, Untitled (The Vase), 1948, floral still life, watercolor and graphite on paper, 11 3/4 x 8 1/2 inches

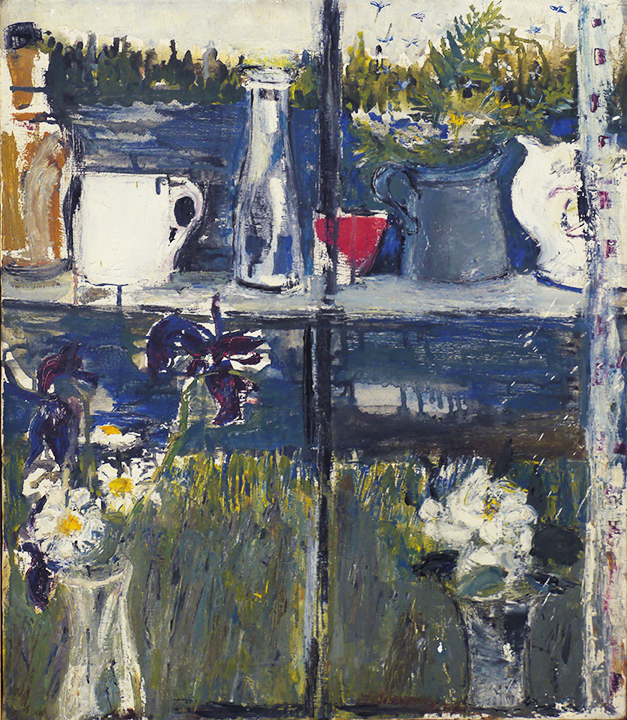
(4) Edith Schloss, Untitled (West Window, Red Cup), about 1957, oil on canvas 20 x 17 1/8 inches

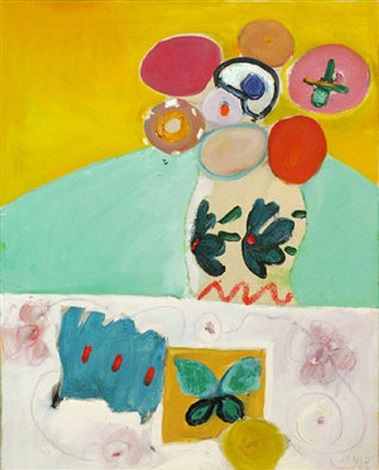
(5) Edith Schloss, Rignalla, 1967, oil on canvas, 22 x 17.75 inches

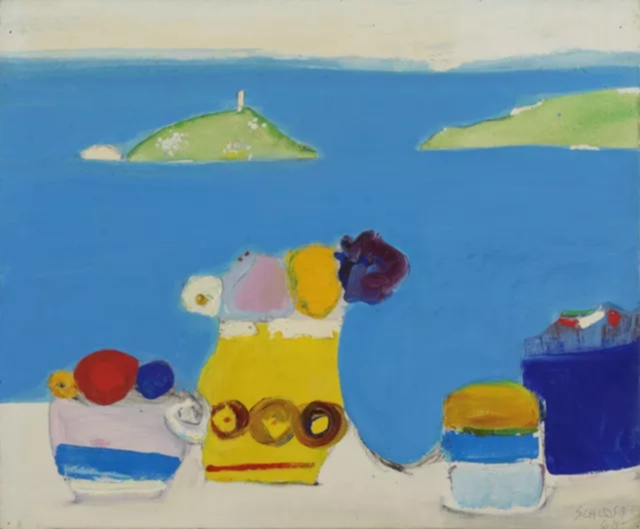
(6) Edith Schloss, The Day of the Hedgehog, 1968, oil on canvas, 19 1/2 × 23 7/16 inches

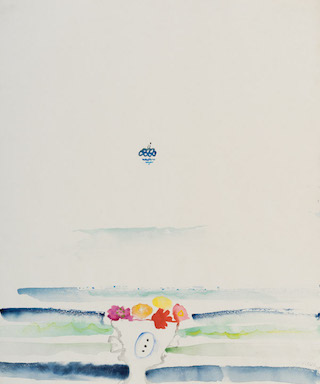
(7) Edith Schloss, Untitled (Isola del Tino), 1970, watercolor on paper, 21 3/4 x 18 1/5 inches

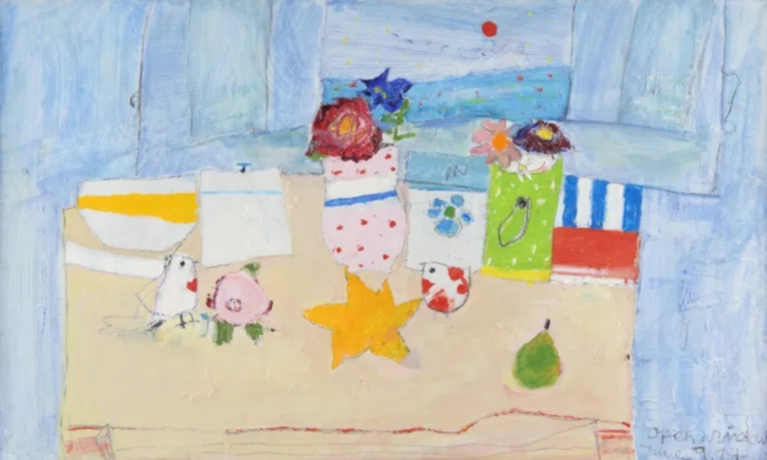
(8) Edith Schloss, Open Window (June 4), 1974, oil on canvas, 17 3/4 x 29 7/16 inches

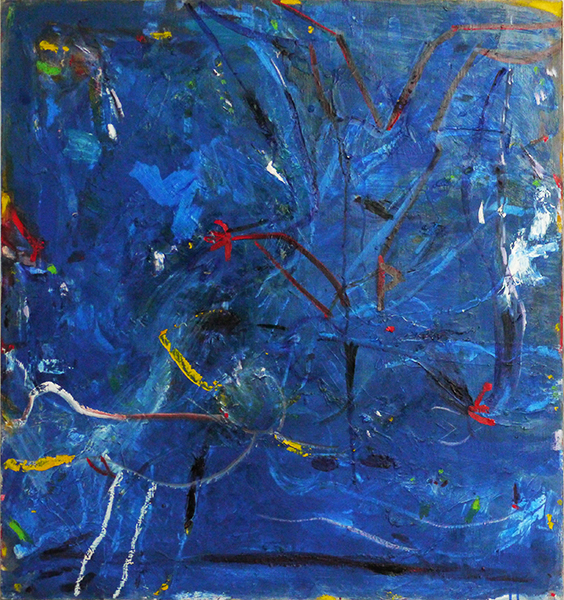
(9) Edith Schloss, Thetis, 1989, oil on canvas, 65 x 60 inches

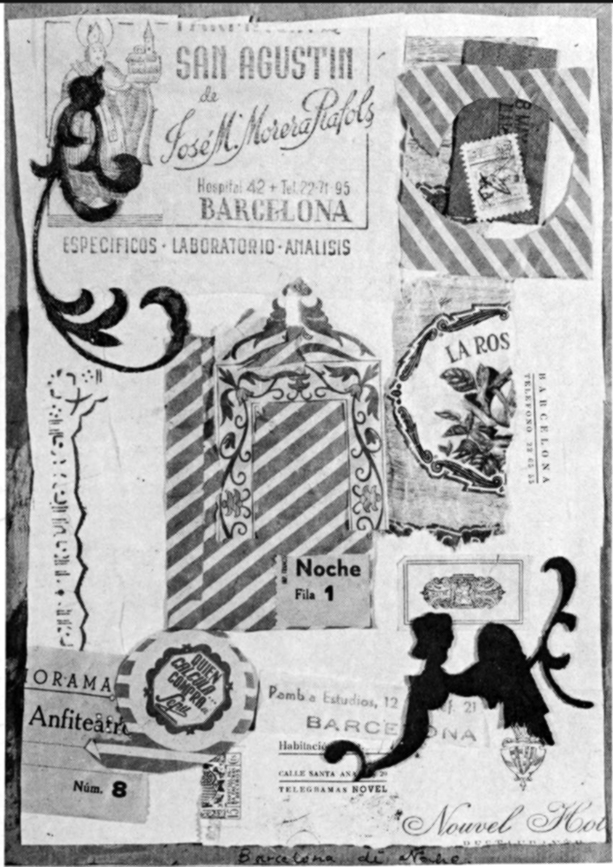
(10) Edith Schloss, Barcelona at Night, monochrome photo of collage, 1955

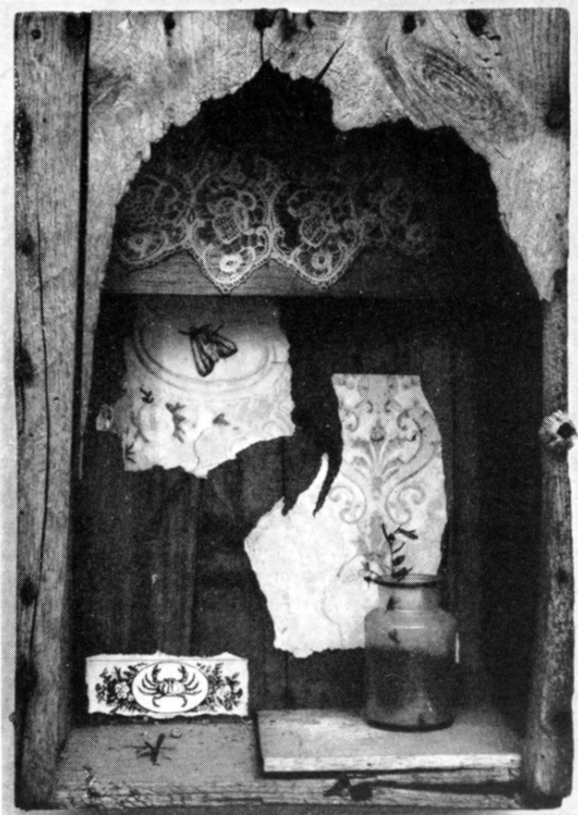
(11) Edith Schloss, Dow Road, 1958, monochrome photo of a driftwood box with collage of wallpaper scraps, old print, lace doily, dried moth, glass jar, weeds, 13” high x 9” wide X 4 1/2" deep

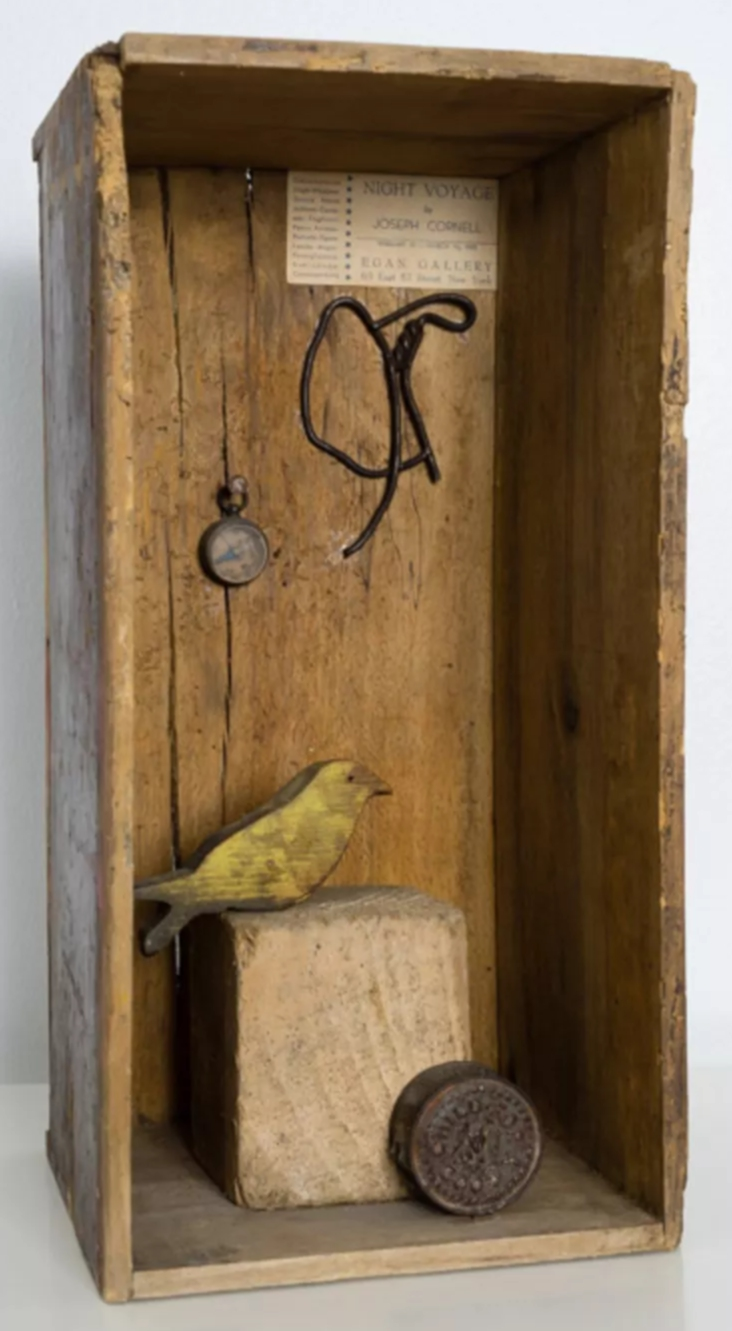
(12) Edith Schloss, Night Voyage: Homage to Joseph Cornell, about 1962

==== Style and technique of her paintings ====
Schloss wrote: "Coming from Europe, I believed in abstraction. The Art Students League and the few galleries up and down Fifty-Seventh Street showed figuration—pensive and sad or acid and lurid ... Then, at a party in a farmhouse in New Jersey ... I saw a small painting ... The small abstraction was beautiful. I'd never seen anything like it. Fairfield Porter found me staring at it. 'Would you like me to take you to the man who did that?' I was thrilled. To get to know the man who had painted such a picture ... was wonderful." — Edith Schloss, speaking of her first impression of a painting by Willem de Kooning, 1943 or 1944, quoted in Life in the Lofts

Throughout her career Schloss made small landscapes and still lifes in oil and watercolor. Beginning in the 1950s she also made small constructions: wooden boxes with found-object contents. Critics saw the influence of many artists in her work, ranging from Matisse to Klee and from Porter to Twombly, mentioning also Jean Siméon Chardin and Giorgio Morandi. Other supposed influences included the work of Tworkov and of Burckhardt. She herself named Matisse, Morandi, and Piero della Francesca as her main sources of inspiration. Writing in 2015 the artist and critic Thomas Micchelli noted how little effect the works of these artists appeared to have on Schloss's paintings. He said that their works had "little bearing" on her mature work but that she shared with her contemporaries an intention "to make painting new, strange and urgent, to cross the rigor of classicism with the rat-a-tat of Bebop." Although she did not say de Kooning's paintings had an influence on her style, Schloss did say her first encounter with his work had another sort of influence. In her posthumous memoir Schloss described her first sight of an early de Kooning painting, calling it a "beautiful" "small abstraction" the like of which she had never seen before. She wrote, "It was green and gray and black. In it leaned a curvilinear shape like a number eight, or two sliced 0s, egg-like shapes snugly fitting. There was something still and clear about the little thing." On another occasion she explained her reaction to the painting as a turning point in her approach to her art by saying, "I stopped looking out and tried to scoop shapes and colors from within myself." In 1936 or 1937 de Kooning made a small study that roughly seems to match Schloss's description (see image 1, above). He made it while employed by the WPA Federal Art Project for a mural at a public housing complex called Williamsburg Houses. As a non-citizen he was forced to resign from the WPA soon after he had begun. The WPA assigned the abstract painter Lee Krasner to complete the work.

In 1947 a critic said Schloss's non-representational paintings were dominated by their "abstract pattern" and, two years later, another called her paintings "light-hearted abstractions". In 1949 a critic described one of her paintings as a "lyric abstraction made up of pastel-colored, bird-like curves". The painting called "Games" (see image 2, above), might be this painting or one like it. In the 1950s, one critic said her still lifes were "delicate" and "quaintly arranged". Another said they were "charming and pretty", having "dainty arrangement" and "painted with a free but clearly intentioned stroke." A third called them "tastefully decorative, sincere and pleasantly reminiscent of Chardin, ... but using a modern palette". Schloss's untitled still life known as "The Vase" (see image 3, above) was made at this time. In the same period, critics said her landscapes were "realist", captured "the chill and intense light" of the locale they depicted (in this case scenes of coastal Maine), and achieved a "brilliant coldness of blue tonality" (again of Maine). The untitled painting known as "West Window" or "Red Cup" (see image 4, above, painted at Deer Isle, Maine) comes from this period.

Schloss wrote: "In Maine in the late fifties I let everything go. Then what I always did afterward came to me when I did not even know it. I was sitting at Dow's point [overlooking Northwest Harbor in the town of Deer Isle, Maine] with Phil Pearlstein who was drawing its strange twisted folded rocks. I was painting a watercolor of sea and spruce trees. We had been thinking the same thing we found out when we spoke. Let all that stuff that's inside us, abstraction, go, and concentrate on what is before us. I did not worry anymore. I wanted to paint the pitchers, bottles, flowers I had set up to please my eye, and the weather and water beyond them." — Edith Schloss, quoted in "Edith Schloss" by Allen Ellenzweig (Arts Magazine, March 1977)

After she had settled in Rome, Schloss adopted what would later be seen as her mature style. Like earlier paintings these generally were seascapes having intense coloration and incorporating a still life treatment of objects that had personal meaning for her. The curator and critic Jason Andrew described an oil painting in this style called "Rignalla" as "bright and honeybee sweet". (See image 5, above.) The background of these paintings was often blue sky over blue water. A favorite element in the background was the Isola del Tino in the Bay of La Spezia, described as "a chunk of rock capped by an historic lighthouse poking out of the Ligurian Sea". A 1968 oil entitled "The Day of the Hedgehog" (see image 6, above) is an example of one such painting. It also demonstrates another general feature of Schloss's work. She frequently used titles that identified a specific aspect of the work such as its location or the day it was painted. The title of this painting refers to the Italian version of what Americans call Groundhog Day. Another typical aspect of "Day of the Hedgehog" was the use of an antique reference point. In 12th century, in a Tuscan commune called Montepulciano, a local hermit was nicknamed "Riccio de'Ricci" (hedgehog of hedgehogs) for his service in predicting the success of grape harvests by observing hedgehog behavior. During this period Schloss continued to paint in both oil and watercolor. An untitled watercolor known as "Isola del Tino" of 1970 (see image 7, above) shows her handling of the medium. Writing in 1974, Hilton Kramer of the New York Times said her watercolors of this period were "by far the strongest" of her paintings, adding that "the thin washes of color, the impulsive delineation of the contours of objects and the spaces they occupy, the general aura of poetic fantasy—all this somehow remains more persuasive in the quickness of the water-color medium than in the more studied, 'corrected' rhythm of oil painting." Another critic called attention to the presence of large areas of white space in paintings of this time saying these areas helped keep "the bright, decorative color from being too pretty." A critic said her oil, "Open Window (June 4)" (see image 8, above) demonstrated the specificity of conditions at the time she made the painting as to place, light, weather, and even, temperature. This critic quoted Schloss on the subject: “It’s the fine things explaining the daily, explaining the ever". Her oil painting, "Thetis" (see image 9, above), shows what a critic called an "attack of paint to canvas". It was one of a series of works inspired by Greek myths. Schloss later described her choice of titles for works in this series. "In my titles"' she wrote, "I allude to the old Mediterranean fables, to sun drunk Icarus, the water-flirt Galatea, the happy island,—to defiance, to games and myths." The paintings, she wrote, "are not about the safe sheltering earth, but the two oldest human adventures: to go under in what we came from, the blue mystery, or to rise up and be consumed to clear red hot dust—bodies and disks and line."

Schloss wrote: "Artists are always immensely solemn when they write about themselves. But what most of us really try to do is to scoop a little order out of the wilderness. What's before you are molds of minutes, nests that hold eggs as well as lice, tools for thought and memory. You eat up color and spit it out, forge a split through the general mess of life. Like a spider you secrete your own past and spin a web from horror and joy." — Edith Schloss, wall card in the exhibit, Blue Italian Skies Above, 2022

Some critics warned against seeing Schloss's mature paintings as ingenuous, shallow, or merely pretty. As one said, "lurking in that casual lightness is a distinct quality of mortality and limitation." Another noted that she "developed a style that balanced crudeness with complexity." She herself asked viewers who saw only lightness to “look again”. She wrote, “There are other things. The Greeks cried: ‘Oimoi!’ which meant not only joy, wonder and mischief, but also taunt fury, grief, and fear.”

==== Style and technique of her boxes and collages ====
In her posthumous memoir, Schloss recalled a visit to a 1953 exhibition of Joseph Cornell's boxes. She said the boxes "touched off unremembered memories, drew me into unheard-of distances." At that time she was already making collages and, within her group of artist friends, was not alone in doing so. The technique, she said, was considered avant-garde and "considered alright by the abstractionists." A black and white photo of one of these, "Barcelona at Night" (1955, image 10, above), was included in a book called How to Make Collages by John Lynch (1975, Viking Press). In her memoir she noted the similarity between collage and what later came to be called assemblage. A box, she wrote, is "collage in the round so to speak." She began her first boxes in the early 1950s and completed the first group of them in 1958. A box made that year entitled "Dow Road" was included in a landmark exhibition called "The Art of Assemblage" held in at the Museum of Modern Art in 1961 (see image 11, above). A few years later she made a box called "Night Voyage: Homage to Joseph Cornell that a curator called "a perfect tribute" to her friend containing a label from an exhibition of Cornell's work held at the Egan Gallery in the early 1950s (see image 12, above). She continued to make boxes for the rest of her career and for a time was better known for them than for her oils and watercolors. In reviewing the 1974 solo exhibitions at the Green Mountain and Ingber galleries, Hilton Kramer said her watercolors were more successful than what he called her "small constructions and boxes". He wrote that they were "handsomely done, but one does not feel quite the same pressure of a personal point of view in them." In contrast, a critic who reviewed the same shows that year said her boxes were "genuinely artless, neither rarefied nor precious" and in 2022 a third said her participation in the "Art of Assemblage" exhibition was the highlight of her career.

== Art writer ==
Schloss once told her son she could not decide which was more important to her, art or writing. As he recalled, she "could not decide whether she was a painter who writes or a writer who paints." Her first piece appeared in 1945. A report on artists who had fled Europe for New York and other American cities during World War II, it was published in German in a newspaper called Deutsche Blätter edited by German refugees in Santiago de Chile. In addition to news and opinions the paper contained literary and art reviews, fiction, and poetry. Although it was short-lived and given little notice after its demise, the New York German émigrés of its day recognized it for the contributions it received from authors such as Günther Anders, Hermann Hesse, Carl Jung, Arthur Koestler, Thomas Mann, and Stefan Zweig. After Schloss's marriage and during her son's infancy she published nothing but in 1954 she began writing for ARTnews. She did so because she had heard that a local school run by the Hudson Guild would only accept the children of working mothers. At the time her name appeared on the masthead as an editorial associate, the others in that position included box artist, Lawrence Campbell; poet and art critic, Frank O'Hara; painter, Fairfield Porter, and author/critic, Parker Tyler. Her first reviews appeared in the issue of November 1954. Appearing in the "Reviews and Previews" section, they described one group exhibition, one duo exhibition, and six solos. One of the solo exhibitions was the first-ever given by the African-American artist, Joseph Delaney. After a brief biographic statement, the review focused on Delaney's subjects and technique, noting that he was "crazy about crowds and the New York scene" and citing his "preoccupation with detail" and the "undulating movement" evident in the paintings." In the magazine's next issue she reviewed an exhibition of works on paper by Oskar Kokoschka in which she said the watercolors, with their "deep glow of jewels embedded in heavy black lines" were "full of surprises" and the portraits with their "cobwebs of line" clearly indicated "underlying facial bone structure". Her first lengthy, featured review appeared in the issue for January 1958. Entitled "The Unfinished Cathedral and Antonio Gaudi", it described Gaudi's Sagrada Família in Barcelona and a recently opened Gaudi exhibit at the Museum of Modern Art. Schloss was proud of her job. "It was marvelous", she wrote, "Here I was, without connections, without much art historical background, without a clique pushing me, and, having been forced out of school at the age of sixteen, suddenly on the staff of the prestigious ARTnews." She stayed with the magazine until she relocated to Rome. From 1968 to 1988 she served as art critic for the Paris-based International Herald Tribune. She mainly wrote of art affairs in Italy for that paper, including, for example, a four-part series called "A Guide to the Art Galleries in Rome" published in the spring of 1970. She also reviewed exhibitions in New York. In one of these reviews, she might have been the first critic to notice the work of Jean-Michel Basquiat. The piece discussed an exhibition at MoMA PS1 in which his work appeared. A decade before writing her profile of MEV in the Village Voice, she had written an article on her friend Nell Blaine for that paper. She also wrote for the monthly English-language magazine, Wanted in Rome. A few months after Schloss's death Wanted in Rome published a profile she had written of Cy Twombly, calling him "the most lyrical painter of our time".

In addition to her writings on Italian and American art and music, Schloss wrote articles on cultural topics of current interest. In the early 1970s, she wrote two articles about abortion in Italy. The first, called "One Woman/All Women: Abortion in Italy", appeared in Ms. magazine in 1973 and the second, called "Italian Women Speak Up for Abortion" appeared in Feminist Revolution: Redstockings, published by the radical feminist organization of that name in 1975. She also self-published books, including Seven Dog Walks In Rome Or More (1974) and Songs of la Serra (poems and drawings, 1982). Her best-known book was the posthumously-published memoir The Loft Generation. Discussing her art writings in this book, she wrote: "Art writing is like embroidery, knitting, or another painstaking craft. Pushing words around gives you the satisfaction of a craft well done. You get your wits together to write as intelligently and amusingly as you are able to. Its greatest reward is this: while your art may languish away in the studio, your art writing bursts into the daylight and functions in public. Immediately in print, it serves people, neatly fits into everyday activity. At its best it is a signpost to the viewer, to show her or him how to appreciate things anew, to stir up fresh perception."

== Art teacher ==
In the late 1970s, Schloss began teaching art classes in the Roman satellite campuses of several American universities including the Tyler School of Art and Architecture (Temple University, Philadelphia), Rhode Island School of Design, and the University of Minnesota. She also gave lectures at Rome's Galleria Nazionale d'Arte Moderna and the American Academy in Rome and on Italian radio and television programs.

== Socialist beliefs ==
When she arrived in London as a stateless and penniless refugee, Schloss immediately fell in with a small and tight-knit group of militant socialists. In her memoir and other writings she did not say how she first came in contact with the group's members. Because some of them were in Frankfurt during the time she studied at a technical school there, it is possible, if not probable, that she met them then. The group was called the Internationaler Sozialistischer Kampfbund and was referred to as ISK. In English-speaking countries it became known as the International Socialist League of Struggle. Its objectives were the overthrow of the Nazi regime to be replaced by a Leninist, but anti-Stalinist, political cadre that was to be highly disciplined and directed by an elite core of leaders. The group's discipline and small size enabled it to escape Nazi purges in the early 1930s and, although it achieved none of its objectives, its relative insignificance allowed it to pull off a stunt that temporarily embarrassed the regime. The event, called the Autobahn-Aktion, was staged during opening ceremonies for the first finished portion of the Reichsautobahn in 1935. The regime detected the Aktion beforehand. Nazis placed flags over slogans that ISK members put on bridges and used sand to cover slogans painted on the roadway. However, they failed to notice some roadway slogans that had been painted in a light-sensitive paint that became apparent only after the sun rose on the day of the ceremony or to detected a trash heap that had been seeded and fertilized causing a slogan to appear as the grass grew. Schloss was probably in Frankfurt at the time of the action. She admitted to having a rebellious nature and a hatred of Nazism but available records do not indicate how she responded to news of this event or say whether she had contact with members of the ISK at that time. The group that fed and housed her in London was an offshoot of ISK called the Militant Socialist International, or MSI.

Heinz Langerhans, with whom Schloss lived in Boston and New York during the early 1940s, was a member of ISK. While studying in Germany, Langerhans had become acquainted with other German émigrés then living in New York. Two of his German friends, Paul Mattick and his wife Ilse, lived on the block on 21st Street in which, in 1944, Schloss would rent her loft. It was via Ilse's friendship with Fairfield Porter that Schloss's New York acquaintanceship was enlarged to include the artists who lived and worked in, or, like Porter, frequently visited the block. During this period Schloss's future husband, Rudy Burckhardt, a photographer, also came to live on the 21st street block and became friends with another of the German socialist émigrés, Ellen Auerbach, who was also a professional photographer. The interconnection between the German émigré socialists and the artists, both émigré and American-born, was described by Gary Roth in Marxism in a Lost Century (Koninklijke Brill, Leiden, 2005). He wrote that Fairfield Porter's studio was down the block from the Matticks' apartment. Porter had taken over the studio from Walter Auerbach after he and Ellen had separated. Willem de Kooning lived a few doors away. Nell Blaine lived across the street. Edwin Denby and Rudy Burckhardt lived together in an apartment "that could be reached across the rooftops". Others in the neighborhood included the poet James Schuyler and artist Jane Freilicher. In Loft Generation Schloss acknowledged this intersection in writing about her first sighting of a Willem de Kooning painting. The farmhouse where she saw the painting was occupied by a German émigré, Fritz Henssler, who worked closely with Mattick, Auerbach, and Langerhans.

In the early 1930s Auerbach and Langerhans had helped Henssler edit Proletarier ("Proletarian") magazine. Like the other two Henssler entered the U.S. as a political refugee. Before the United States entered World War II, they and the other Germans with whom they associated made little progress in obtaining popular support for their socialist campaign against both capitalism and totalitarianism. After the Americans entered the war, the group's anti-Nazi stand was pretty much universal in the United States. Its opposition to capitalism was much less popular than it had been during the years of the Great Depression and its opposition to Stalinism failed to gain traction within its target audience of industrial workers. The group, as one writer put it, experienced dwindling confidence in its effectiveness as a proponent of revolutionary socialism. As the war came to a close, it became clear that Schloss and her friends among the abstract expressionists had abandoned the hope that their political beliefs might benefit society. Ilse Mattick later wrote: "There was nothing going on. The [German émigré] group hadn't broken up, exactly—we were still all friends, but there was nothing going on politically."

== Personal life and family ==
Schloss was born in Offenbach, Germany, on July 20, 1919. Her birth name was Edith Lina Schloss. Her father, Ludwig Wilhelm Schloss (1884-1943), was a successful leather goods dealer specializing in women's handbags. Little is known of her mother save her given name and dates, Martha Goldschmidt Schloss, 1889–1994. Schloss had a younger brother named Fritz (born in 1922 and called Fred after emigration to the U.S.). Her father sent her abroad during her early teens because he believed language proficiency was important and because Nazi persecution increasingly restricted the education available to Jews within Germany. In November 1938 he telephoned Schloss in London to say the family had emerged relatively unscathed by the Kristallnacht pogrom and had finally decided they could no longer remain in Germany. With help from her acquaintances and British contacts of her father's, she was able to obtain letters of invitation for each of the three family members and by August 1939 all of them had arrived and been permitted to remain as stateless refugees and, technically, enemy aliens. Under British law Ludwig did not have the same freedom of movement or ability to obtain employment as did his wife, daughter, and son. He died in an internment camp in Shrewsbury in 1943. Others among Schloss's relatives, including her father's mother, remained in Germany and did not survive the war. In 1940 Schloss traveled alone to Quebec on a steamship in convoy and crossed into the U.S. in Vermont as a stateless refugee, having named a cousin living in New York as her sponsor. After she had settled in Manhattan, she helped her mother and brother to join her. She applied for U.S. citizenship in 1941 and was granted it in the summer of 1946. A few months later she and Burckhardt married. He and Edwin Denby were lovers at the time. Schloss was unconcerned about their attachment to each other and, like some of her friends, was unimpressed by the social significance of marriage. She later wrote, almost as an aside in connection with her move to the loft on 21st Street, "Eventually he came to live with me in Pit's loft, where we ended up getting married, raising a child, and spending eighteen years together." Jacob Burckhardt, their son and only child, was born in 1949. Schloss took primary responsibility for his care. The loft where they lived when he was born had no bathtub. The shower stall, which Willem de Kooning had constructed when Ellen Auerbach lived there, was located near the front door and the area used as a kitchen was at the back. Jacob's crib was in the part of the loft Schloss used for a studio.

In the late 1950s, the Schloss's marriage fell apart. As she put it, she and Rudy "had a lot of trouble with each other". They separated in 1961 and three years later when their divorce was formalized, she moved to Rome. As she had done in New York, Schloss quickly established herself in her new home. She habitually spent the cooler months in Rome and the warmer ones on the Italian Riviera where she did most of her painting. She and Jacob traveled to New York for exhibitions and to visit old friends but Italy was her permanent the main focus of her life and work.

Schloss died in her home in Rome on December 21, 2011, and was subsequently buried in the Campo Cestio Cemetery which is also known as the Protestant, Non-Catholic or English Cemetery a cemetery in that city. Her death occurred the day before the opening of a joint presentation of her paintings and music by Alvin Curran.

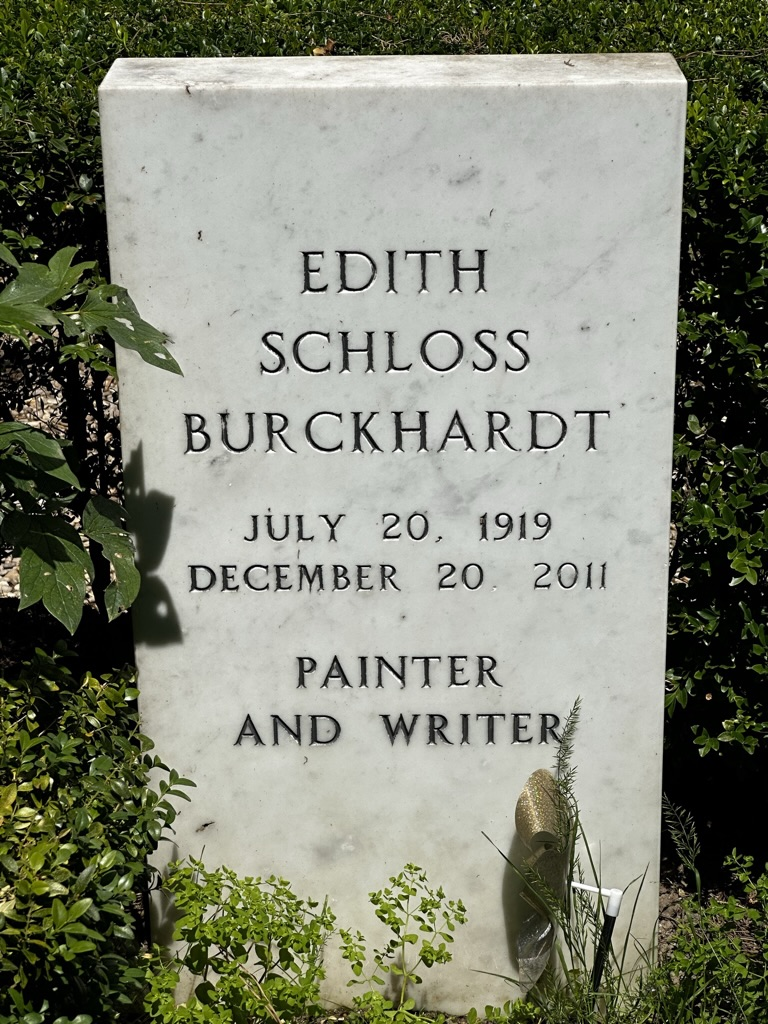
Tomb in the Campo Cestio Cemetery in Rome, Italy

She was described variously by people who knew her as having a "vivacity of temperament, both artistic and intellectual, as a "tough, talented, ambitious, and whip-smart survivor," and as a person both "vital and unaffected", having "a big personality in a diminutive frame" and an "impish smile".
