= Tom Burckhardt =

American artist and painter, born 1964

- Born: Tom E. Burckhardt; May 2, 1964 (age 62); New York City, New York, U.S.
- Occupations: Artist; painter
- Spouse: Kathy Butterly
- Parents: Rudy Burckhardt; Yvonne Jacquette
- Relatives: Burckhardt family
- Website: Official website

Tom E. Burckhardt (born May 2, 1964) is an American artist and painter based in New York City. He is the youngest son of Rudy Burckhardt and therefore a member of the Burckhardt family. He is a recipient of Pollock-Krasner Foundation, New York Foundation for the Arts, Guggenheim Foundation and the Joan Mitchell Foundation Grants. His work has been extensively exhibited throughout the United States such as at Weatherspoon Museum of Greensboro and the Knoxville Art Museum.

== Early life and education ==
Burckhardt was born May 2, 1964, in New York City, the youngest son of Rudy Burckhardt, a Swiss-born photographer and filmmaker, and Yvonne Jacquette, a painter from Pittsburgh, Pennsylvania. He had an older half-brother, Jacob who was born in 1949 from the prior marriage of his father to Edith Schloss. Through his father he is a descendant of the patrician family Burckhardt of Basel, Switzerland.

== Personal life ==
Burckhard is married to artist Kathy Butterly. They reside in New York City.
