= James Walston =

British academic (1950–2014)

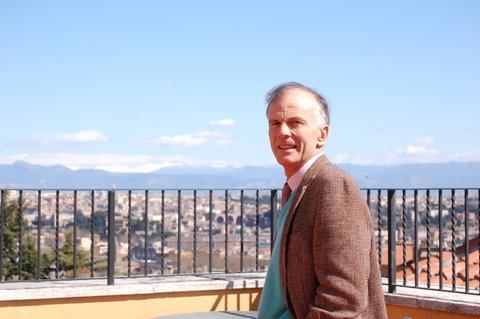
- Walston on the American University of Rome terrace
- Born: 28 July 1950
- Died: 12 May 2014 (aged 63); Rome, Italy
- Education: Jesus College, Cambridge
- Scientific career
- Fields: Political science and modern history
- Workplaces: American University of Rome

James Patrick Francis Walston (28 July 1950 – 12 May 2014) was a British professor of international relations at The American University of Rome (AUR), specialising in Italian politics and modern history. He was chair of the AUR's Department of International Relations from 2002 to 2008. In 2008 he started the Center for Research on Racism in Italy together with Isabella Clough Marinaro. In 1997, he became the first non-Italian EU citizen to stand for election to Rome City Council.

== Early life and education ==
Walston was the youngest son of the Labour Party (and later SDP) peer Henry Walston, Baron Walston, and his wife Catherine. He was educated at Eton and Jesus College, Cambridge, where he read law and graduated in 1971. He later studied social and moral sciences as a postgraduate at the University of Rome, La Sapienza (Diploma di Perfezionamento, 1980), before returning to Cambridge to complete a PhD in political science, where he was supervised by Paul Ginsborg.

== Teaching ==
Walston had taught mainly in the US system abroad, starting with the University of Maryland programme for the US military in Italy and the UK, summer courses at Middlebury College, and at various US programmes in Rome including those of Temple, Trinity and Loyola universities. Since 1991 he taught history, politics and international relations at The American University of Rome. From 2004 until his death he taught and directed the University of Rome La Sapienza's Eurosapienza's international relations module for the Masters programme in state management and humanitarian affairs.

In 2003, he introduced on-site teaching of international relations which includes regular field trips to European institutional sites like Brussels, Geneva and Vienna, as well as to conflict resolution sites like the Basque Country, Northern Ireland, Montenegro and Kosovo, and annual Ghana trip.

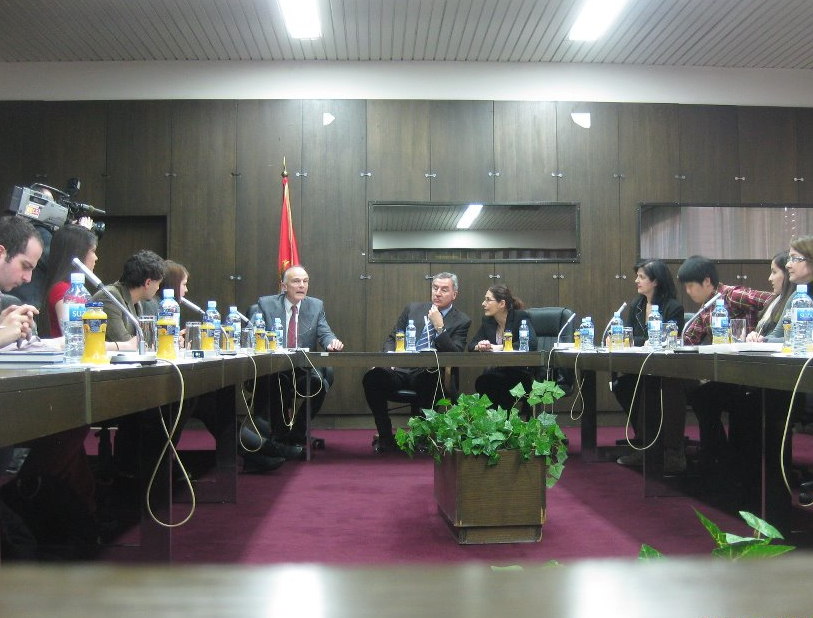
Walston (centre left) addresses students at a meeting with Milo Đukanović

== Journalism and comment ==
Walston published regular articles in Wanted in Rome from 1989 until his death; he also wrote a regular column for Italy Daily (Italian supplement the IHT) from 1999 to 2002, for The Guardian and The Independent. His blog was Italian Politics with Walston.

== Scholarly publications ==
Walston was one of the first academics who wrote about fascist Italy's role in ethnic cleansing and the internment of elements of the civil population in Italian concentration camps, such as under Mario Roatta's watch in the Province of Ljubljana, that are in the Italian media subjected to the repression of historical memory, and to historical revisionism especially in relation to the post-war foibe massacres.

Organised crime

- 1986 "See Naples and die; organised crime in Campania" in Kelly Robert (ed.) Organized crime. A global perspective. Totowa NJ, Rowman & Littlefield: 134–158

Clientelism

- 1988 Mafia and Clientelism. Roads to Rome in Post-war Calabria. London, Routledge (revised Italian edition 1995 Le Strade per Roma. Clientelismo e politica in Calabria (1948–1992) Soveria Mannelli, Rubbettino (updated and revised translation of Mafia and clientelism)

Italian foreign policy

- 2004 "The Shift in Italy's Euro-Atlantic Policy. Partisan or Bipartisan?" The International Spectator XXXIX (2) October–December 115 – 125
- 2007 "Italian Foreign Policy in the 'Second Republic'. Changes of Form and Substance" Modern Italy Volume 12 (1) February
- 2008 "La politica estera: il difficile perseguimento di un ruolo influente" in Mark Donovan and Paolo Onofri (eds.) Politica in Italia. I fatti dell'anno e le interpretazioni. Bologna, Istituto Cattaneo/Il Mulino: 151–171 "Foreign Policy: The Difficult Pursuit of Influence" in Mark Donovan and Paolo Onofri (eds.) Italian Politics. Frustrated Aspirations for Change Bologna, Istituto Cattaneo/Il Mulino: 123–140 (English version of above).

Italian history

- 1997 "History and memory of the Italian concentration camps", Historical Journal 40 (1) 169–183.
- 2000 "Nationalisms and internationalism: the response of Italian Jews to Fascism" in Thomas P. DiNapoli The Italian Jewish Experience. Forum Italicum. A Journal of Italian Studies. SUNY, Stony Brook: 141 – 154
- 2010 "Italy’s 'second generations': the sons and daughters of migrants" in Bulletin of Italian Politics 2 (1) Summer 2010 (with Isabella Clough Marinaro).
