= Elisabeth Vischer-Alioth =

Swiss suffragist (1892–1963)

- Born: Elisabeth Alioth; 7 September 1892; Arlesheim, Switzerland
- Died: 20 August 1963 (aged 70); Basel, Switzerland
- Occupation: Women's suffrage campaigner
- Spouse: Eberhard Vischer (m. 1919)
- Parents: Ludwig Rudolf Alioth (father); Berta von Speyr (mother)
- Relatives: Eberhard Vischer (father-in-law); Wilhelm Vischer (brother-in-law)

Elisabeth Vischer-Alioth (born Elisabeth Alioth; also Elisabeth Vischer; 7 September 1892 – 20 August 1963) was a Swiss campaigner for women's suffrage. In 1916 she co-founded the women's suffrage association of Basel and its surroundings, which she presided over from 1922 to 1935, and from 1940 to 1952 she was president of the Swiss Association for Women's Suffrage. From 1946 to 1952 she was Honorary Secretary of the International Alliance of Women. In 1955 she became the first woman elected to the citizens' commission (Bürgerkommission) of the city of Basel.

== Biography ==
Elisabeth Alioth was born on 7 September 1892 in Arlesheim, the daughter of Ludwig Rudolf Alioth, an entrepreneur, and Berta née von Speyr. After attending private schools in Basel and Geneva, she studied at the Soziale Frauenschule (Social Women's School) in Berlin in 1913–1914. In 1919 she married Eberhard Vischer, a clerk (Gerichtsschreiber) at the Basel court of appeal and the son of Eberhard Vischer. She was the sister-in-law of Wilhelm Vischer.

During World War I she worked for the state aid commission (Staatliche Hilfskommission) of the canton of Basel-Stadt for families in need, and from 1915 to 1918 she headed the district secretariat of Pro Juventute in Basel-Stadt. From 1916 to 1919 she was secretary of the music school and conservatory of Basel.

In 1916 she co-founded the association for women's suffrage of Basel and its surroundings (Vereinigung für Frauenstimmrecht Basel und Umgebung), on whose board she sat from 1920 and which she presided over from 1922 to 1935. In 1918 she took part in founding the Basel women's association liaison center (Frauenzentrale). From 1929 to 1936 Vischer-Alioth sat on the central board of the Swiss Association for Women's Suffrage, and from 1940 to 1952 she was its president. In the Federation of Swiss Women's Associations (BSF) she was recording secretary (Aktuarin) from 1923 to 1926 and a board member from 1949 to 1957; she belonged to its commission for legislative studies and insurance until 1953 and to the editorial commission of its press service until 1963. During World War II she worked on the women's commission for economic questions (Frauenkommission für Wirtschaftsfragen) of Basel-Stadt.

In 1946 Vischer-Alioth co-organized the 14th congress of the International Alliance of Women (IAW) in Interlaken, and from 1946 to 1952 she was Honorary Secretary of the IAW. After 1920 she often wrote in the Swiss press, under the initials EVA, on political equality and other women's concerns. From 1935 to 1951 she made numerous lecture tours on women's issues and gave courses in running associations, to prepare women for taking part in public political life.

As a delegate of the church board (Kirchenvorstand), Vischer-Alioth served in the Christian Association of Young Women (Christlicher Verein Junger Töchter, Cevi). In 1955 she took part in founding the European Women's Union (Europäische Frauenunion), an association of Catholic and Protestant women. She was a co-founder and president of the women's group of the Association of Protestant Voters (Vereinigung Evangelischer Wähler). In 1955 she became the first woman elected to the citizens' commission (Bürgerkommission), the naturalization commission of the city of Basel, and in 1961 she was elected, together with twelve other women, to the Weiterer Bürgerrat, the parliament of the city's Bürgergemeinde, whose new term she opened as its oldest member (Alterspräsidentin). She died on 20 August 1963 in Basel.

== Bibliography ==
- Basler Nachrichten, 21 August 1963 (obituary)
- National-Zeitung, 21 August 1963 (obituary)
- Femmes suisses, 21 September 1963 (obituary)
- Lotti Ruckstuhl, Frauen sprengen Fesseln. Hindernislauf zum Frauenstimmrecht in der Schweiz, 1986, 46

=== Archives ===
- Gosteli Foundation archive, Worblaufen, Elisabeth Vischer-Alioth papers
- Swiss Social Archives, Zurich, records of the Swiss Association for Women's Rights (Schweizerischer Verband für Frauenrechte)
