= Andreas Vischer =

Swiss surgeon (1877–1930)

- Born: 18 September 1877; Basel, Switzerland
- Died: 10 June 1930 (aged 52); Basel, Switzerland
- Occupation: Surgeon
- Spouse: Gertrud Oeri
- Father: Wilhelm Vischer
- Relatives: Wilhelm Vischer (brother); Eberhard Vischer (brother); Hanns Vischer (cousin); Albert Oeri (brother-in-law)

Andreas Vischer (18 September 1877 – 10 June 1930) was a Swiss surgeon from Basel. From 1905 he headed the mission hospital of the German Orient Mission (Deutsche Orient-Mission) in Urfa, and from 1912 he was also surgical head of the town's state hospital. After his return to Basel he helped stateless Armenian refugees until his death.

== Biography ==
Andreas Vischer was born on 18 September 1877 in Basel, the son of Wilhelm Vischer. His brothers were Wilhelm Vischer and Eberhard Vischer, and Hanns Vischer was his cousin. He married Gertrud Oeri, daughter of Johann Jakob Oeri, a secondary school teacher (Gymnasiallehrer). He was a brother-in-law of Albert Oeri.

Vischer went to school and trained as a surgeon in Basel. He obtained his doctorate in medicine in 1904 and his Habilitation in 1918. In 1905 he was elected to succeed Hermann Christ as head of the German Orient Mission's hospital in Urfa, in present-day Turkey. The hospital had been founded in 1897. In 1912 the governor of Urfa also appointed him surgical head of the town's state hospital.

The First World War prevented Vischer and his wife from returning to Urfa from home leave. The couple went back for one more year only in 1919, and lived through the French–Turkish fighting for the town. Vischer then built up a medical practice in Basel. Until his death, he helped the stateless Armenian refugees, from 1928 as president of the Swiss aid for blind Armenian orphans in Lebanon (Schweizerhilfe für blinde Armenierwaisen im Libanon). He died in Basel on 10 June 1930.

== Works ==
- Erlebnisse eines Schweizerarztes bei den türkischen Nationalisten, 1921

== Bibliography ==
- H.-L. Kieser, "Betroffenheit, Aufbruch und Zeitzeugnis", in H.-L. Kieser (ed.), Die armenische Frage und die Schweiz (1896–1923), 1999, 211–266

=== Sources ===
- G. Vischer-Oeri, Tagebuch aus Urfa 1919/1920, n.d. (Basel University Library)

=== Archives ===
- Basel-Stadt State Archives (Staatsarchiv Basel-Stadt), Basel
