= Wilhelm Fischer =

Wilhelm Fischer may refer to:

- Wilhelm Fischer (boxer) (born 1972), "Willi", German boxer
- Wilhelm Fischer (musicologist) (1886–1962), Austrian musicologist
- Wilhelm Fischer (politician) (1904–1951), "Willy", German politician

== See also ==
- Wilhelm Vischer (disambiguation)
