= Wanted in Rome =

English-language magazine for expatriates in Rome, Italy

- Editor: Marco Venturini
- Categories: News magazine
- Frequency: Monthly
- Founded: 1985; 41 years ago
- Country: Italy
- Based in: Rome
- Language: English
- Website: www.wantedinrome.com

Wanted in Rome is a monthly magazine in English for expatriates in Rome established in 1985. The magazine covers Rome news stories that may be of interest to English- and Italian-speaking residents, and tourists as well. The publication also offers classifieds, photos, information on events, museums, churches, galleries, exhibits, fashion, food, and local travel.

Wanted in Rome was founded in 1985 by two expats who identified the need of an aggregation magazine for the English-speaking community. In 1997, it launched its website.

The same publisher launched Wanted in Milan in 2005, followed by Wanted in Europe in 2006 and Wanted in Africa in 2007. These last three have no printed version, only websites.

== Editors ==
- Mary Wilsey (1982 to 2015)
- Marco Venturini (2015 to present)

== Contributors ==
- Edith Schloss
- Cynthia Rockwell
- Judith Harris
- James Walston
- Alexandra Richardson
- Margaret Stenhouse
- Caroline Prosser
- Camilla Van Staaden
- Laura Clarke
- Helene Pizzi
- Geoffrey S Watson
- Gabrielle Bolzoni
- Andy Devane
- Caitlin Frost
- Marco Venturini
- Ludovico Maloba
