= Benedikt Vischer =

Swiss officer and politician (1779–1856)

- Born: 22 June 1779; Basel, Old Swiss Confederacy
- Died: 16 December 1856 (aged 77); Basel, Switzerland
- Occupations: Military officer; politician
- Spouses: Margaretha Burckhardt (m. 1803) Sophia Preiswerk (m. 1807)
- Children: Wilhelm Vischer
- Parents: Johann Jakob Vischer (father); Margaretha Stähelin (mother)
- Relatives: Wilhelm Vischer (brother); Peter Vischer (uncle)

Benedikt Vischer (22 June 1779 – 16 December 1856) was a Swiss artillery officer and politician from Basel. He became head of the Basel artillery in 1817 and a colonel in the federal artillery staff in 1839. A member of the Grand Council from 1814 to 1856, he was one of the leading liberals in Basel during the Restoration. On 3 August 1833, against his will, he commanded the Basel city troops that were defeated by the troops of Basel-Landschaft at the Hülftenschanz.

== Biography ==
Benedikt Vischer was born on 22 June 1779 in Basel, the son of Johann Jakob Vischer, a member of the council (Ratsherr), and Margaretha Stähelin. His brother was Wilhelm Vischer, and his uncle was Peter Vischer. In 1803 he married Margaretha Burckhardt, and in 1807 Sophia Preiswerk, daughter of Nicolaus Preiswerk. His son was the classical philologist Wilhelm Vischer.

In 1799 Vischer became a lieutenant in the artillery. In 1817 he became head of the Basel artillery, and in 1839 a colonel in the federal artillery staff (eidgenössischer Artilleriestab), head of the military school in Thun (Thuner Schule) and a member of the federal war council (eidgenössischer Kriegsrat).

From 1814 to 1856 Vischer was a member of the Grand Council of the canton of Basel, later of Basel-Stadt. During the Restoration he was one of the leading liberals in Basel, and after 1830, in the political conflict with the countryside (Landschaft), he argued for an understanding. From 1815 to 1823 he was a member of the court of appeal (Appellationsgericht). He was one of the founders of the Voluntary Academic Society (Freiwillige Akademische Gesellschaft).

Against his will, on 3 August 1833 Vischer had to take command of the expedition (Auszug) of the Basel city troops, which ended in defeat by the troops of Basel-Landschaft at the Hülftenschanz. He died in Basel on 16 December 1856.

== Archives ==
- Basel-Stadt State Archives (Staatsarchiv Basel-Stadt), Basel: personal papers (Nachlass)
