= Rudy Burckhardt =

Swiss-American filmmaker and photographer

- Born: Rudolph August Burckhardt; April 6, 1914; Basel, Switzerland
- Died: August 1, 1999 (aged 85); Searsmont, Maine, U.S.
- Occupations: Photographer; filmmaker
- Years active: 1935–1999
- Spouses: Edith Schloss (m. 1947; div. 1961) Yvonne Jacquette (m. 1964)
- Children: 2, including Tom
- Relatives: Burckhardt family

Rudy Burckhardt (né Rudolph August Burckhardt; April 6, 1914 – August 1, 1999) was a Swiss-American filmmaker, and photographer, known for his photographs of the hand-painted billboards that began to dominate the American landscape in the 1940s and 1950s. He was married to Edith Schloss and Yvonne Jacquette. His youngest son is artist Tom Burckhardt.

== Life ==
Burckhardt was a member of the Swiss patrician Burckhardt family. He discovered photography as a medical student in London. He left medicine to pursue photography in the 1930s. He immigrated to New York City in 1935. Between 1934 and 1939, he traveled to Paris, New York, and Haiti making photographs mostly of city streets and experimenting with short 16mm films. While stationed in Trinidad in the Signal Corps from 1941–1944, he filmed the island's residents. In 1947, he joined the Photo League in New York City. Burckhardt married painter Yvonne Jacquette (1934-2023) whom he collaborated with throughout their 40-year marriage. During the mid-Fifties he worked with Joseph Cornell on "The Aviary", "Nymphlight", "A Fable For Fountains", and "What Mozart Saw On Mulberry Street". He taught filmmaking and painting at the University of Pennsylvania from 1967 to 1975. He was the great-uncle of author Andreas Burckhardt.

Burckhardt killed himself in 1999.

== Exhibitions (selection) ==
- October 25, 2014 – February 15, 2015 "Rudy Burckhardt – In the Jungle of the Big City" at Fotostiftung Schweiz
- November 4, 2011 – March 25, 2012 "The Radical Camera: New York's Photo League, 1936–1951" at Jewish Museum (New York)
- September 23, 2008 – January 4, 2009 "New York, N. Why? Photographs by Rudy Burckhardt, 1937–1940" at Metropolitan Museum of Art
- February 1, 2008 – May 14, 2008 "Street Dance: The New York Photographs of Rudy Burckhardt" at Museum of the City of New York
- May 9 – July 15, 2000 "Rudy Burckhardt and Friends: New York Artists of the 1950s and '60s" at New York University
