= Wilhelm Vischer (philologist) =

Swiss classical philologist (1808–1874)

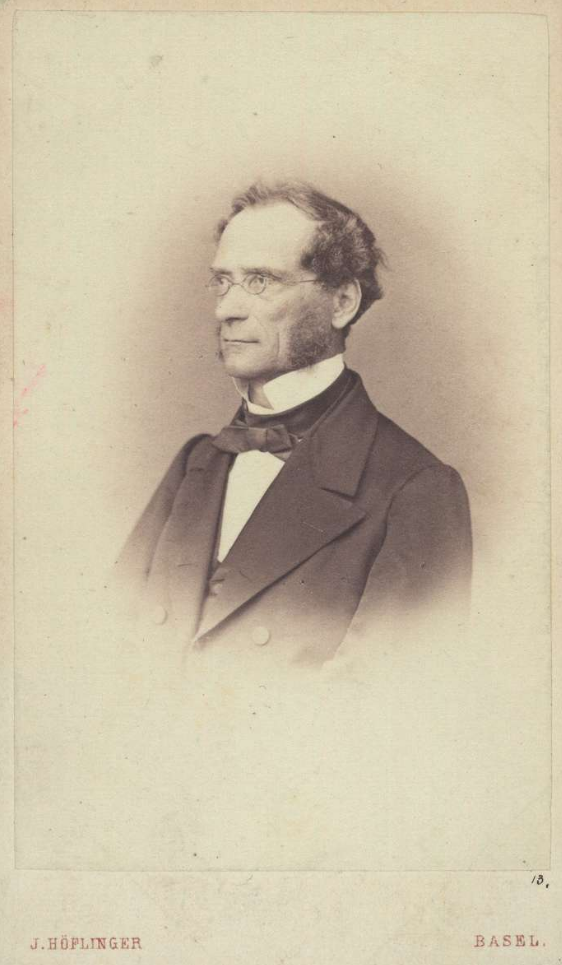
- Photograph by Jakob Höflinger
- Born: 30 May 1808; Basel, Switzerland
- Died: 5 July 1874 (aged 66); Basel, Switzerland
- Occupations: Classical philologist; politician
- Spouse: Emma Valeria Maria Bilfinger (m. 1832)
- Children: Wilhelm Vischer
- Father: Benedikt Vischer
- Relatives: Hanns Vischer (grandson)

Wilhelm Vischer (30 May 1808 – 5 July 1874), also known as Wilhelm Vischer-Bilfinger, was a Swiss classical philologist and conservative politician from Basel. He was professor of Greek philology at the University of Basel from 1835 to 1861, and in 1867 he became a member of the Small Council and head of the cantonal education department. He was the first representative of a comprehensive study of antiquity (Altertumswissenschaft) at the University of Basel, and in 1869 he supported the appointment of Friedrich Nietzsche.

== Biography ==
Wilhelm Vischer was born on 30 May 1808 in Basel, the son of Benedikt Vischer. In 1832 he married Emma Valeria Maria Bilfinger from Stuttgart, daughter of Eberhard Bilfinger, a merchant. His son was the historian Wilhelm Vischer, and his grandson was Hanns Vischer.

From 1816 to 1825 Vischer attended the educational institution (Erziehungsanstalt) at Hofwil. From 1825 to 1828 he studied classical antiquity (Altertumswissenschaften) in Basel, from 1828 in Bonn and from 1830 in Jena. He obtained his doctorate in Jena in 1831 and his Habilitation in Basel in 1832. From 1832 to 1861 he taught Greek language and literature at the Pädagogium. At the University of Basel he became associate professor (ausserordentlicher Professor) of Greek philology in 1835 and was full professor from 1836 to 1861.

From 1834 Vischer was a conservative member of the Grand Council of Basel. In 1863 he became a member of the education board (Erziehungskollegium) and of the board of trustees (Kuratel) of the University of Basel, and in 1867 a member of the Small Council and head of the cantonal education department (Vorsteher des staatlichen Erziehungswesens).

Vischer did valuable work in building up gymnastics (Turnwesen) in Basel. In 1836 he co-founded the Historical Society (Historische Gesellschaft) and in 1842 the Antiquarian Society (Antiquarische Gesellschaft), and from 1849 he headed the antiquarian department of the museum on the Augustinergasse. He was the first representative of a comprehensive study of antiquity at the University of Basel, and in 1869 he supported the appointment of Friedrich Nietzsche. He was a corresponding member of the Prussian Academy of Sciences. He died in Basel on 5 July 1874.

== Bibliography ==
- A. von Gonzenbach, Lebensbild des Prof. Dr. Wilhelm Vischer in Basel, [1878]

=== Archives ===
- Basel-Stadt State Archives (Staatsarchiv Basel-Stadt), Basel: family archive (Familienarchiv)
