= Wettstein =

Wettstein is a Swiss surname. Bearers of the name include:

- Bryce Wettstein (born 2004), American skateboarder
- Carla Wettstein (born 1946), Swiss and Australian chess master
- Diter von Wettstein (1929–2017), plant geneticist
- Fritz von Wettstein (1895–1945), Austrian botanist
- Johann Jakob Wettstein (1693–1754), Swiss theologian
- Johann Rudolf Wettstein (1594–1666), Swiss diplomat
- Oskar Wettstein (1866–1952), Swiss journalist and politician
- Otto von Wettstein (also given as Otto Wettstein-Westersheimb) (1892–1967), Austrian zoologist
- Richard Wettstein (1863–1931), Austrian botanist

== See also ==
- Wettstein system, system of plant taxonomy developed by Richard Wettstein
