= Fritz Heinis =

French biologist (1883–1970)

Fritz Heinis (9 February 1883 – 16 August 1970) was a Swiss biologist, botanist and bryologist.

== Biography ==
Born 9 February 1883, in Waldenburg, he worked as an instructor at district schools in Böckten (1905–07) and Therwil (1907–11) and at a secondary school in Basel (1911–44). In 1919, he obtained his doctorate from the University of Basel. He was a member of the Botanischen Kommission Basel.

In the field of bryology, he collected mosses mainly in the environs of Basel, as well as in the cantons of Bern, Solothurn and Graubünden. His herbarium is kept at the Canton Museum Baselland in Liestal.

He died on 16 August 1970, in La Chaux-de-Fonds.

== Selected works ==
- Tardigarden der Schweiz, 1908 – Tardigrades of Switzerland.
- Systermatik und Biologie der moosbewohnenden Rhizopoden, Rotatorien und Tardigraden der Umgebung von Basel mit Berücksichtigung der übrigen Schweiz, 1910 – Systematics and biology of moss-inhabiting rhizopods, rotatoria and tardigrades in the environs of Basel, etc.
- Beiträge zur Flora des Kantons Baselland, 1926 – Contribution to the flora of Baselland.
- Beiträge zur Mikrofauna der Umgebung von Liestal, 1933 – Contribution to microfauna in the environs of Liestal.
- Beiträge zur Mikrobiocoenose in alpinen Pflanzenpolstern. — Berichte des Geobotanischen Institutes Rübel 1936: 61–76.
- Beiträge zur Floristik des Kantons Baselland: Ein altes Baselbieter Herbar, NFG 11, 1940, 91-98 – Contribution to the floristics of Baselland.
- Die Naturschutzbestrebungen im Kanton Baselland in den letzten 30 Jahren, NFG 11, 1940, 102–125.
- Beitrag zur Mikrobiocoenose der Sphagnumpolster auf God dal Fuorn im Nationalpark. — Ergebnisse der wissenschaftlichen Untersuchungen im Schweizerischen Nationalpark 1: 525–547 (1945).
