= René Teuteberg =

Swiss historian (1914–2006)

René Teuteberg (born 5 February 1914 in Basel, Switzerland; died 12 February 2006) was a Swiss historian.

René Teuteberg, attended schools in Basel and Schiers. He then studied history at the University of Basel, where he was awarded the Dr. Phil. Afterwards he worked as a middle school teacher at the Basel Girls' School (since 1971 Diplommittelschule). Teuteberg has written numerous publications on Basle history, including a popular overview, and has regularly held courses in this area on the subject at high school level. He also wrote six historical radio plays for Swiss radio.

== Works ==
- Prosper de Barante (1782–1866): Ein romantischer Historiker des französischen Liberalismus, Basel 1945 (Dissertation)
- Berühmte Basler und ihre Zeit. Sieben Biographien – ein Volkshochschulkurs an der Universität Basel im Wintersemester 1976, Basel 1976
- Basler Geschichte, Basel 1986 (2. Aufl. 1988)
- Das Kloster St. Alban und die Vorstadtgesellschaft zum hohen Dolder, Basel 1992
- Wer war Jacob Burckhardt? Basel 1997
- Mitautor: Albert Oeri – 1875 bis 1950. Journalist und Politiker aus Berufung, Basel 2002.
