= Wilhelm Vischer (botanist) =

Swiss botanist (1890–1960)

- Born: 5 January 1890; Basel
- Died: 2 June 1960 (aged 70); Basel
- Occupation: botanist
- Known for: phycology

Wilhelm Vischer (5 January 1890 in Basel – 2 June 1960 in Basel) was a Swiss botanist whose areas of interest were algae and spermatophytes.

He studied medicine in Geneva and Basel, and natural sciences in Munich, where in 1914 he obtained his PhD. At the Ludwig-Maximilians-Universität München, he was a student of Karl Ritter von Goebel. Following graduation, with Robert Hippolyte Chodat, he participated in a botanical excursion to Paraguay. After his return to Switzerland, he spent several years in Geneva (1914–1919), working on plants that were collected in Paraguay.

Beginning in 1919, he worked as a botanist at the rubber research station in Buitenzorg, Java. In 1924, he qualified as a lecturer at the University of Basel, where from 1928 to 1960, he served as an associate professor of botany.

In 1937, Adolf Pascher named the algae genus Vischeria in his honour.

== Selected publications ==
- La Végétation du Paraguay. Résultats Scientifiques d'une Mission Botanique Suisse au Paraguay, with Robert Hippolyte Chodat, 1927 (Google Books).
- Études mycologiques faites au Parc national suisse, Jules Favre, Wilhelm Vischer, Fritz Heinis, 1945.
