= Wilhelm Vischer (historian) =

Swiss historian (1833–1886)

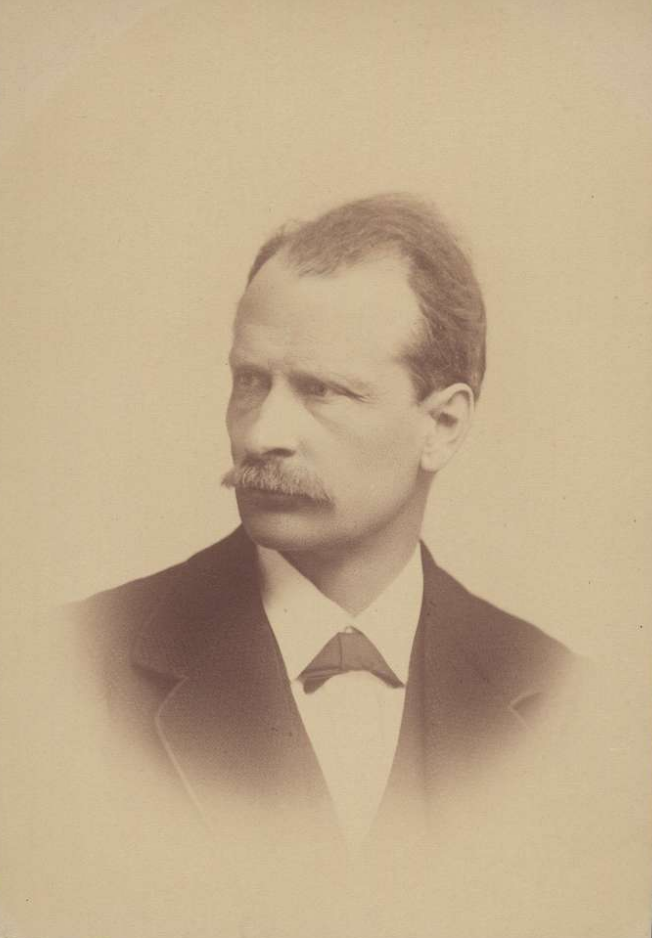
- Born: 4 August 1833; Basel, Switzerland
- Died: 30 March 1886 (aged 52); Basel, Switzerland
- Occupations: Historian; librarian; politician
- Spouse: Katharina Sophie Heussler (m. 1859)
- Children: Eberhard Vischer; Wilhelm Vischer; Andreas Vischer
- Father: Wilhelm Vischer

Wilhelm Vischer (4 August 1833 – 30 March 1886) was a Swiss historian and conservative politician from Basel. He was chief librarian of the Basel University Library from 1866 to 1871 and professor of Swiss history at the University of Basel from 1867, and he edited the Basler Chroniken and the Urkundenbuch der Stadt Basel. From 1874 to 1886 he sat in the Grand Council of Basel, and in 1875 he co-founded the Eidgenössischer Verein.

== Biography ==
Wilhelm Vischer was born on 4 August 1833 in Basel, the son of Wilhelm Vischer. In 1859 he married Katharina Sophie Heussler, daughter of Daniel Heussler, a silk-ribbon manufacturer. His sons included Eberhard, Wilhelm and Andreas.

Vischer studied theology in Basel and Bonn and history in Berlin and Basel, and in 1856 he obtained his doctorate (Dr. phil.) in Basel. In 1857 he became a Privatdozent in Basel and a teacher at the Pädagogium, and from 1862 to 1866 he was a Privatdozent in Göttingen. From 1866 to 1871 he was chief librarian (Oberbibliothekar) of the Basel University Library. At the University of Basel he became associate professor (ausserordentlicher Professor) of Swiss history in 1867 and full professor in 1874.

As a conservative politician, Vischer sat in the Grand Council of Basel from 1874 to 1886. In 1875 he was one of the co-founders of the Eidgenössischer Verein, which he presided over in 1885–1886, and he was co-editor of the Allgemeine Schweizer Zeitung. From 1874 to 1883 he took part in the church synod and the church council (Kirchenrat), but he withdrew from church politics after the obligation to profess the creed (Bekenntniszwang) was abandoned.

Among other works, Vischer edited the Urkundenbuch der Stadt Basel (vol. 1, 1890) and the Basler Chroniken (vols. 1–3, 1872–1887). He sat on the boards of the Historical and Antiquarian Society of Basel (Historische und Antiquarische Gesellschaft Basel) and of the General Historical Research Society of Switzerland (Allgemeine Geschichtforschende Gesellschaft der Schweiz). In 1876 the University of Basel awarded him an honorary doctorate in law (Dr. iur. h.c.). He died in Basel on 30 March 1886.

== Bibliography ==
- Anzeiger für schweizerische Geschichte, new series, 18, 1887, no. 4, 84 f. (with a list of works)
- D. Roth, Die Politik der Liberal-Konservativen in Basel, 1875–1914, 1988
