= Hanns Vischer =

Sir Hanns Vischer, CMG, CBE (1876 -1945) was a Swiss born British national who was an advisor on education to the government of the Northern Nigeria Protectorate. He was appointed the first Director of Education for the Northern Region and developed the first policies of secular education for the region. Upon his retirement from colonial service, he served as a member of the Advisory Committee on Education in the British tropical colonies for sixteen years.

== Life ==
Vischer was born to a Rosalie and Adolphe Vischer, his father was a writer and humanitarian while his paternal grandfather, Wilhelm Vischer, a Protestant was a professor at University of Basle and was a descendant from a lineage of silk traders. Rosalie Fischer was also from a commercial family with links to the textile trade, her family, the Sarasins, were of Huguenot heritage conducting business in Basel.

Vischer had his early education in Basel and at Niesky, Germany, he traveled to England and attended Southeastern College, Ramsgate before earning his bachelor's and master's degree from Emmanuel College, Cambridge. Towards his final year in college, he had developed interest in African ethnology and had attended an Hausa language training course in Tripoli. After leaving Emmanuel College, he spent a year at Ridley Hall where he became familiar with the Church Missionary Society. In 1901, he traveled to Nigeria with some CMS missionaries visiting Hausaland. His stay in Lokoja was limited as he suffered several bouts of fever. Vischer then went back to his native home to recuperate. He returned in 1903, as a naturalised British, resigning from missionary work which he was fond of, he joined the colonial service as an Assistant Resident. His first station was in Bornu, there he heard about the caravan trade and slave route between Tripoli and Bornu. In 1906, Vischer embarked on a journey through the Sahara, from Tripoli to Kukawa to study some of the cultures that might have influenced the Kanuri people. Among the passengers in the journey were freed slaves, pilgrims from Mecca, camel drivers and guides from Niger.

In 1908, Vischer was seconded to the education department to develop an industrial school in Nasarawa, Kano. He was the only one recommended for the position, partly through his knowledge of Arabic, Hausa, Fulani and Kanuri but also because he had been sympathetic to the cultures of the Kanuris. To prepare him for his new position, he was sent to Egypt and Sudan to study Kuttabs and schools in Mansoura, Bulaq and Giza and in the Sudan.

By 1911, Vischer's educational policy helped found an elementary school, a training school for mallams, a school for the sons of Emirs and a technical school. The objective of the schools was not to promote European culture but to preserve the culture and social life of Northern Nigeria and to train pupils for the Native Administration and in the work of craft. The schools were the first non-Quranic schools in the Northern Protectorate. In 1913, provincial elementary schools were established in Katsina and Sokoto. In 1914, upon the amalgamation of Nigeria, Vischer was appointed Director of Education for the Northern Region. Though, he was officially the director, he spent most of his years during the Great War working for the War Office and for the Secret Intelligence Services. He resigned his position with the colonial service in 1919.

in 1923, he became the honorable secretary of the Advisory Committee on Education in the British colonies in Africa and a year later was involved in the foundation of the International Institute of African Languages and Cultures.
