= Wilhelm Vischer (theologian) =

Swiss theologian (1895–1988)

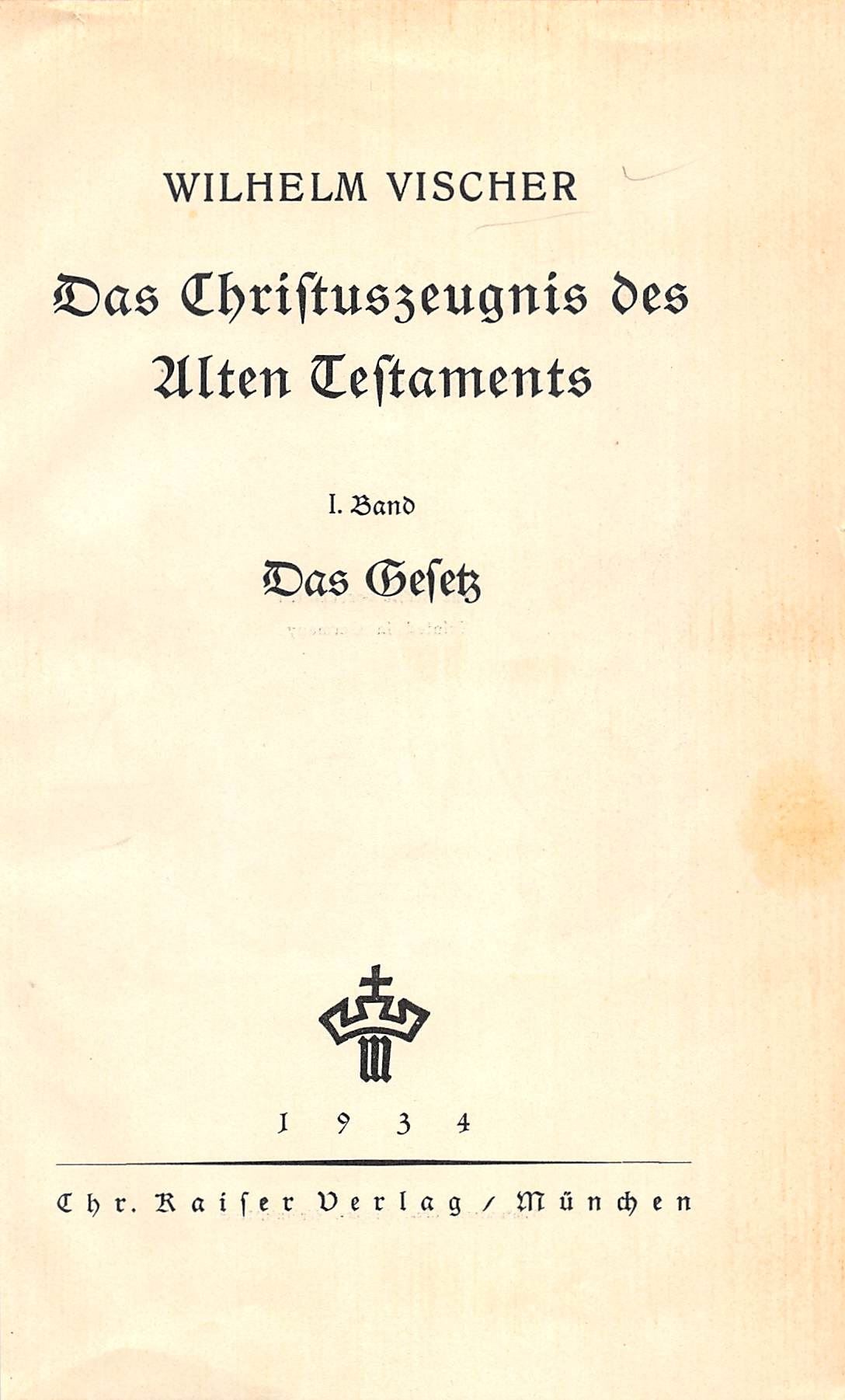

Wilhelm Eduard Vischer (30 April 1895 in Davos – 27 November 1988 in Montpellier) was a Swiss pastor, theologian, Hebraist, Old Testament scholar and amateur Lied lyricist. One of his major areas of study was that of Christ in the Old Testament.

From 1934 he was pastor of the German-speaking evangelical church in Lugano. In the same year he published the first volume of Das Christuszeugnis des Alten Testaments on the Pentateuch. In 1942 the second volume on the early prophets and Joshua to Kings. He was a pastor in Basel until 1947 when he moved to become professor of Old Testament in Montpellier.

In the time of rising anti-Semitism in Germany, Vischer defends the Old Testament against all takers. He defends the idea that Jesus is the Christ in the sense in which the Old Testament defines Israel's Messiah. Besides the obstacles Vischer faced in his time, he found a supporter and friend in Karl Barth and his neoorthodox theology.
