= Grand Council of Basel-Stadt =

Parliament of the canton of Basel-Stadt, Switzerland

Grand Council of Basel-Stadt German: Grosser Rat des Kantons Basel-Stadt
- 2024 election period

Type
- Type: Unicameral

Structure
- Seats: 100
- Political groups: SP 33; Greens 12; LDP 12; SVP 12; FDP 7; Centre 7; GLP 7; BastA! 6; EVP 4; AB 1; VA 1

Elections
- Last election: 20 October 2024
- Next election: 2028

Meeting place
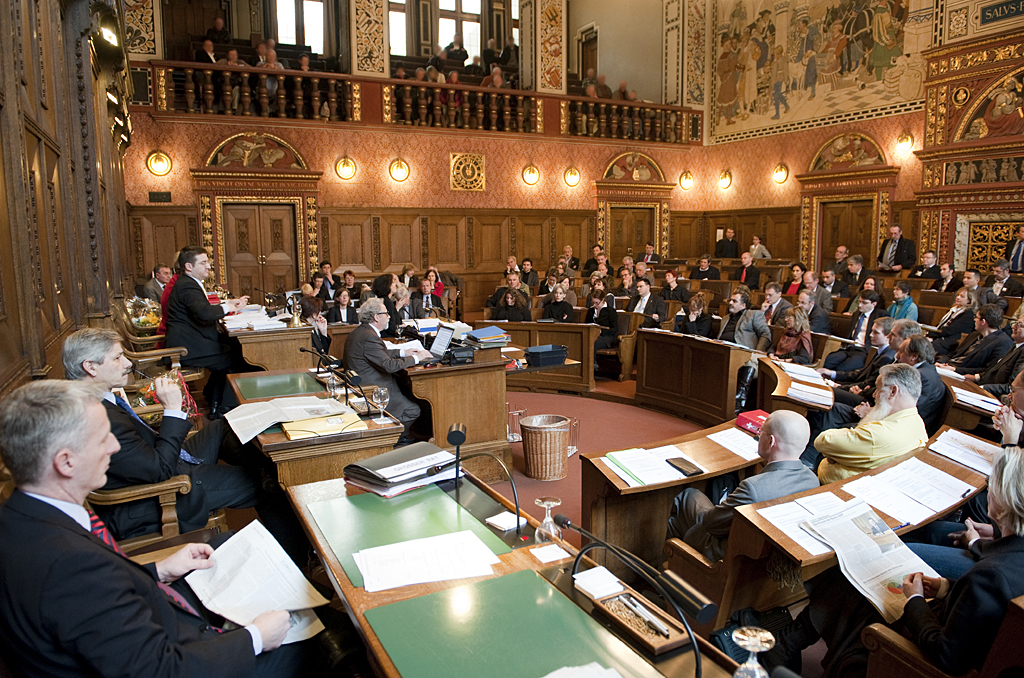
- Rathaus Basel

Website
- www.grosserrat.bs.ch/de/

The Grand Council of Basel-Stadt (German: Grosser Rat) is the legislature of the canton of Basel-Stadt, in Switzerland. Basel-Stadt has a unicameral legislature. The Grand Council has 100 seats, with members elected every four years. Members of the canton's executive, the Executive Council, are elected on the same day.

At the 2008 election, held on 14 September 2008, the Social Democratic Party fared badly, but retained its dominant position, with more than twice as many seats as the next-largest party, the Swiss People's Party (SVP). The legislature was reduced from 130 seats to 100, making all existing parties to lose ground. However, the SVP and Green Party both did relatively well, as did the new centrist Green Liberal Party, which won five seats.

At the 2012 election, held on 28 October 2012, the Volksaktion, a populist anti-immigration party, was able to win two seats, while the Evangelical People's Party lost all but one of their seats.

At the 2016 election, held on 23 October 2016, the Social Democrats, the Greens and the Liberals won the election, while the Christian Democratic People's Party, the Green Liberals and the FDP lost popular vote and seats in the Grand Council. The Volksaktion lost their two seats they won four years before.

== Election ==
The council is re-elected every four years. Like other legislatures in Switzerland, elections use party list proportional representation. There are five constituencies. The communities of Riehen and Bettingen each form a constituency, whilst the city of Basel is divided into three constituencies: the area north of the river Rhine is Kleinbasel, whilst the remaining Grossbasel is arbitrarily split into Grossbasel East and Grossbasel West.

Constituency	Seats
Grossbasel East	27
Grossbasel West	34
Kleinbasel	27
Riehen	11
Bettingen	1

== Election overview 1988–2024 ==
Election result

Year	SP	FDP	LDP	CVP	Mitte^{6}	DSP	POB	SD^{1}	EVP^{2}	LdU	GPS	FraP	SVP	GB^{3}	glp
1988^{4}	18.3	13.9	11.0	10.6		8.2	7.8	7.8	6.2	5.7	5.4				
1992	20.7	15.1	12.5	10.3		7.8	5.1	5.5	5.8	2.5	3.5	4.0	3.8		
1996	27.0	12.4	10.7	9.5		8.2		6.1	5.8			5.7	3.5	9.4	
2000	26.0	12.6	11.3	9.9		6.0		4.6	5.6			GB	10.05	9.6	
2004	31.2	11.7	8.6	8.1		4.8		2.9	5.5				12.1	10.9	
2008	28.2	10.1	9.0	9.3		3.2		2.2	5.2				13.9	13.0	5.1
2012	30.7	11.1	9.6	7.3					4.2				15.0	11.8	5.0
2016	32.5	9.2	13.8	5.9					1.4				14.3	13.4	4.3
2020	30.0	8.4	14.1	6.3					3.6				11.0	16.6	7.8
2024	29.2	7.9	12.4		6.7				3.5				13.3	11.0	6.8

Distribution of seats

Year	Total	SP	FDP	LDP	CVP	Mitte	POB	SD	DSP	LdU	EVP	GPS	PdA	FraP	SVP	GB	glp	others
1988	130	27	19	15	15		12	10	9	8	7	5	2					1
1992	130	32	21	17	15		6	8	10	3	6	3	1	5	3			
1996	130	39	17	14	13			8	10		6			7	3	13		
2000	130	39	18	16	14			5	6		6			GB	14	12		
2004	130	46	17	12	11				6		6				15	16		1
2008	100	32	11	9	8				3		4				14	13	5	1
2012	100	33	12	10	8						1				15	13	5	3^{5}
2016	100	34	10	14	7						1				15	14	4	1
2020	100	30	7	14	7						3				11	18	8	2
2024	100	31	7	12		7					4				12	12	7	8

Footnotes

^{1} SD: until 2004: SD, 2008: SD/EDU
^{2} EVP: until 2004: VEW, 2008: EVP
^{3} GB: 1996: GB, 2000: BastA (Greens and FraP), 2004 and 2008: GB
^{4} 1988: additionally: PvA: 2.0%
^{5} VA: 2 seats, AB (Aktives Bettingen): 1 seat
^{6} Die Mitte: Merger of CVP & BDP, 2021
