= Sarasin =

Sarasin is a surname, originating (unrelatedly) in Switzerland and Thailand.

- Arsa Sarasin (born 1937), Thai diplomat and businessman
- Edouard Sarasin (1843–1917), Swiss scientist
- Felix Sarasin the Elder (1771–1839), Swiss merchant and politician
- Felix Sarasin the Younger (1797–1862), Swiss industrialist, mayor of Basel
- Fritz Sarasin (1859–1942), full name Karl Friedrich Sarasin, Swiss naturalist
- Gédéon Sarasin (1573–1636), merchant, progenitor of the Basel Sarasin family
- Hans Bernhard Sarasin (1731–1822), Swiss politician, mayor of Basel
- Jakob Sarasin (1742–1802), Swiss manufacturer and writer in the Age of Enlightenment
- Jean François Sarrazin (c. 1611–1654), or Sarasin, French author
- Kanit Sarasin (born 1964), Thai actor
- Lukas Sarasin (1730–1802), Swiss silk-ribbon manufacturer
- Pao Sarasin (1929–2013), Thai politician and policeman
- Paul Sarasin (1856–1929), full name Paul Benedict Sarasin, a Swiss naturalist
- Pong Sarasin (1927–2021), Thai businessman and politician
- Pote Sarasin (1905–2000), Thai diplomat and politician
- Ronald A. Sarasin (1934–2023), U.S. Representative from Connecticut
- Thian-hee Sarasin (1848–1925), Thai physician

== See also ==
- Sarasin family (Thailand)
- Sarasin family (Switzerland)
- Sarasin's goby
- for species named for the Sarasins
- J. Safra Sarasin, a Swiss private bank
