= Sarasin family (Switzerland) =

Swiss bourgeois family from Basel active in commerce, industry and banking

- Bourgeois family
- Country: Switzerland
- Origin: Lorraine (France) and Basel (Switzerland)
- Founded: 1628 (citizenship in Basel)
- Founder: Gédéon Sarasin
- Connected families: Burckhardt, Heusler, Werthemann, Stehlin, Vischer, Christ, Hoffmann
- Traditions: Pietism, Calvinism

The Sarasin family is a Swiss bourgeois family from Basel that has been prominent since the early modern period in commerce, textile manufacturing, and banking. Of Huguenot and Lorraine origin, the family has no relationship to the bourgeois Sarasin family of Geneva despite sharing the same name. The family distinguished itself from the 19th century onwards particularly in the banking sector and has been active in numerous religious, scientific, and cultural institutions.

== Origins and early history ==
The family's history begins with Regnault Sarasin (1533–1575), a draper and Calvinist who fled to Metz as a Protestant refugee. His son Gédéon Sarasin traveled through Sainte-Marie-aux-Mines and Colmar before settling in Basel, where he was granted citizenship in 1628. The family maintained strong Pietist traditions and was actively involved in regional and international religious institutions, including missionary work, well into the 20th century.

Gédéon's son Peter Sarasin (1608–1662) married into the Burckhardt family, establishing a pattern of matrimonial alliances with prominent Basel bourgeois families that continued for generations. These alliances included connections with the Heusler, Werthemann, Stehlin, Vischer, Christ, and Hoffmann families. Historical funeral orations suggest that women in the family were largely confined to the private sphere, reflecting the social norms of the time.

== Political prominence ==
The family's political ascension began when Peter Sarasin (1640–1719), Gédéon's grandson, entered the Small Council in 1687, marking the Sarasins' rise among Basel's counselor families. His grandson Hans Bernhard Sarasin became the family's first mayor of Basel, serving from 1803 to 1812. At the federal level, family members distinguished themselves as delegates to the Diet, including Hans Bernhard, Felix Sarasin the Elder, and Felix Sarasin the Younger.

== Cultural patronage and architecture ==
During the 18th century, the Sarasins were notable patrons of music, literature, and the visual arts. The family commissioned significant baroque mansions, including the Maison Bleue (Blue House) and the Maison Blanche (White House), constructed by brothers Lukas and Jakob Sarasin according to plans by architect Samuel Werenfels. Jakob Sarasin maintained intellectual connections with prominent figures of the Sturm und Drang movement, including Johann Kaspar Lavater, Jakob Michael Reinhold Lenz, Friedrich Maximilian Klinger, and Johann Heinrich Merck. He also hosted notable personalities such as Johann Heinrich Pestalozzi and Alessandro Cagliostro, and even received Joseph II, Holy Roman Emperor at the Maison Blanche.

== Commercial and industrial activities ==
The Sarasins arrived in Basel as established merchants and initially engaged in the linen trade. From the 17th century, they expanded into silk ribbon manufacturing within the Verlagssystem. By 1680–1690, Hans Franz Sarasin (1649–1719) operated a manufactory in the city. Felix Sarasin the Elder joined the firm Sarasin und Heusler, which traded in colonial goods, indigo, and cotton, while also focusing on ribbon production.

Starting in 1823, Felix Sarasin the Younger established cotton spinning mills at Neuewelt on the Sankt Alban-Teich canal in Basel and at Haagen in the Wiesental, utilizing technological expertise developed in Mulhouse, then a dominant industrial center. Brothers Lukas and Jakob Sarasin inherited their grandfather Hans Franz's manufactory while expanding their commercial relationships, which by the early 19th century extended to the Mediterranean, Black Sea, North Africa, the Middle East, India, Southeast Asia, South America, the Caribbean, and the United States. (Note: Sources disagree: the HDS biographies of Lukas and Jakob Sarasin say the firm was founded by their father, Hans Franz.)

In 1837, Karl Sarasin founded the silk ribbon factory Sarasin & Cie, which he managed from 1855 with his brother Rudolf Sarasin. They rapidly expanded commercial relationships to French Atlantic ports, as well as Amsterdam, Riga, New York, and Rio de Janeiro. Additional manufactories were established in Basel's Sankt Alban district, Lörrach in Baden, and Sissach. Karl Sarasin, demonstrating paternalistic concern for workers, served as president of a commission on factory workers' conditions mandated by the Swiss Society for Public Utility and promoted worker housing construction and other corporate social policies. He also contributed to modernizing Basel's infrastructure and represented Switzerland at the 1851 Great Exhibition in London.

Karl's granddaughter Gertrud Oeri-Sarasin (1891–1975) was among the few family women to speak publicly. After an early divorce, she dedicated herself to family life before becoming involved from 1941 in the Basel Women's Associations Liaison Center.

== Banking enterprise ==
The renowned Banque Sarasin, a private bank, traces its origins to the firm Riggenbach & Cie, which Alfred Sarasin took over in 1893. The company became A. Sarasin & Cie in 1900, then Banque Sarasin & Cie in 1987. Family representatives remained in management positions until the early 21st century. Alfred E. Sarasin, partner and director, served as president of the Swiss Bankers Association from 1965 to 1986. The bank was transformed into a joint-stock company in 2002 and has been majority-owned since 2011 by the Brazilian Safra Group under the name Banque J. Safra Sarasin.

== Scientific contributions ==
At the turn of the 19th and 20th centuries, cousins Paul Sarasin and Fritz Sarasin, both zoologists, devoted themselves to natural history and ethnology. They undertook joint scientific expeditions to the British and Dutch colonies of Ceylon and the Celebes. Numerous Southeast Asian objects from their research and collecting activities are housed at the Museum der Kulturen Basel. They also brought the first elephant to the Zoo Basel from their expeditions. Paul Sarasin was co-founder and first president of the Swiss Commission for Nature Protection and instigator of the Swiss National Park, while Fritz Sarasin served as central president of the Swiss Natural Sciences Society.

== Geographic dispersion and colonial connections ==
Most family branches resided in Basel before dispersing during the 20th century. Growing postcolonial research has highlighted, beyond the Sarasins' major role in Basel's history, their international commercial relationships and the cultural and scientific aspects of their global connections. Particularly notable are connections with French colonies in America, India, and Africa (Senegal), as well as imports of coffee, sugar, and cocoa from Guadeloupe and Martinique, raising questions about possible family participation in the Atlantic slave trade.

== Bibliography ==
- Koechlin, Carl: Rudolf Sarasin. 1831-1905, in: Basler Jahrbuch, 1907, pp. 1–34.
- Almanach généalogique suisse, vol. 3, 1910, pp. 378–385.
- Sarasin, Karl Friedrich: Geschichte der Familie Sarasin in Basel, 2 vol., 1914.
- Joneli, Hans: Gedeon Sarasin und seine Nachkommen, 1928.
- Sarasin-von Geymüller, Hans Franz: Neue Erkenntnisse zur Geschichte der Familie Sarasin, 1978.
- Sarasin, Philipp: La ville des bourgeois. Elites et société urbaine à Bâle dans la deuxième moitié du XIXe siècle, 1998 (German 1990).
- Röthlin, Niklaus: "Sarasin", in: Neue Deutsche Biographie, vol. 22, 2005, pp. 436–437.
- Schär, Bernhard C.: Tropenliebe. Schweizer Naturforscher und niederländischer Imperialismus in Südostasien um 1900, 2015.
- Simon, Christian: Reisen, Sammeln und Forschen. Die Basler Naturhistoriker Paul und Fritz Sarasin, 2015.
