= Felix Sarasin =

Felix Sarasin may refer to:

- Felix Sarasin the Elder (1771–1839), Swiss merchant and politician from Basel
- Felix Sarasin the Younger (1797–1862), Swiss industrialist, mayor of Basel, son of the above
