= Heusner =

Heusner is a German surname. Notable people with the surname include:

- Bill Heusner (1927–2002), American swimmer
- Karl Eduard Heusner (1843–1891), Vice-Admiral of the German Imperial Navy
- Ludwig Heusner (1843–1916), German surgeon

== See also ==
- Heusler
