= Calopsyra =

Scientific classification
- Kingdom: Animalia
- Phylum: Arthropoda
- Class: Insecta
- Order: Orthoptera
- Suborder: Ensifera
- Family: Tettigoniidae
- Subfamily: Phaneropterinae
- Tribe: Holochlorini
- Genus: Calopsyra; Brunner von Wattenwyl, 1891

Genus of bush-crickets

External image
- Images at iNaturalist

Calopsyra is a genus of Asian sickle-bearing bush-crickets, in the tribe Holochlorini, erected by Carl Brunner von Wattenwyl in 1891. The recorded species distribution (possibly incomplete) includes China, Indochina and western Malesia.

== Species ==
The Orthoptera Species File includes three subgenera:

Calopsyra (Calopsyra) Brunner von Wattenwyl, 1891

1. Calopsyra obliterata (Karny, 1923)
2. Calopsyra octomaculata (Westwood, 1848) - type species (as Phylloptera octomaculata Westwood)
3. Calopsyra sexmaculata Gorochov, 2023

Calopsyra (Parapsyra) Carl, 1914

1. Calopsyra brevicauda (Liu, 2011)
2. Calopsyra fuscomarginalis (Liu & Kang, 2006)
3. Calopsyra midcarina (Liu & Kang, 2006)
4. Calopsyra nigrocornis (Liu & Kang, 2006)
5. Calopsyra nigrovittata (Xia & Liu, 1993)
6. Calopsyra notabilis (Carl, 1914)

Calopsyra (Rhodopsyra) Gorochov, 2023

1. Calopsyra laticauda (Karny, 1926) (placed previously in Parapsyra)
2. Calopsyra muricetincta (Karny, 1926)
3. Calopsyra roseoalata Gorochov, 2023
