= Casigneta =

Scientific classification
- Domain: Eukaryota
- Kingdom: Animalia
- Phylum: Arthropoda
- Class: Insecta
- Order: Orthoptera
- Suborder: Ensifera
- Family: Tettigoniidae
- Subfamily: Phaneropterinae
- Tribe: Holochlorini
- Genus: Casigneta; Brunner von Wattenwyl, 1878

Genus of bush-crickets

External image
- Images at iNaturalist

Casigneta is an Asian genus of sickle-bearing bush-crickets, in the tribe Holochlorini, erected by Carl Brunner von Wattenwyl in 1878. The recorded species distribution (possibly incomplete) includes Thailand, Malesia and western Pacific islands.

== Species ==
The Orthoptera Species File lists:

1. Casigneta bilobata Karny, 1926
2. Casigneta bisinuata Karny, 1926
3. Casigneta cochleata Brunner von Wattenwyl, 1878 - type species (by subsequent designation)
4. Casigneta falcata Ingrisch, 1990
5. Casigneta lamellosa Brunner von Wattenwyl, 1891
6. Casigneta longipes Karny, 1926
7. Casigneta palauensis Vickery & Kevan, 1999
8. Casigneta pellucida Brunner von Wattenwyl, 1878
9. Casigneta spinicauda Karny, 1921
