= Peyrou =

Peyrou may refer to:

- Le Palais du Peyrou, a mansion in the city of Neuchâtel, Switzerland
- Porte du Peyrou, a triumphal arch in Montpellier, France
- Manuel Peyrou (1902–1974), an Argentine writer and journalist
