= Werenfels =

Werenfels is a surname. Notable people with the surname include:

- Peter Werenfels (1627–1703), Swiss theologian and professor
- Samuel Werenfels (1657–1740), Swiss theologian, son of Peter
- Samuel Werenfels (1720–1800), Swiss architect
