= Liotrachela =

Scientific classification
- Domain: Eukaryota
- Kingdom: Animalia
- Phylum: Arthropoda
- Class: Insecta
- Order: Orthoptera
- Suborder: Ensifera
- Family: Tettigoniidae
- Subfamily: Phaneropterinae
- Tribe: Holochlorini
- Genus: Liotrachela; Brunner von Wattenwyl, 1878

Genus of bush-crickets

External image
- Images at iNaturalist

Liotrachela is an Asian genus of sickle-bearing bush-crickets, in the tribe Holochlorini, erected by Carl Brunner von Wattenwyl in 1878. The known species distribution (probably incomplete) includes India, Indochina (only Vietnam) and much of Malesia (yet to be recorded in Borneo).

== Species ==
The Orthoptera Species File lists:

1. Liotrachela amboinica Brunner von Wattenwyl, 1878
2. Liotrachela brunneri Krausze, 1903
3. Liotrachela cryptisema Hebard, 1922
4. Liotrachela emarginata Karny, 1926
5. Liotrachela excisa Karny, 1926
6. Liotrachela hyalina (Karny, 1926)
7. Liotrachela iliganae Hebard, 1922
8. Liotrachela lobata Brunner von Wattenwyl, 1891 (3 subspecies)
9. Liotrachela megastyla Ingrisch, 2002
10. Liotrachela minuta Brunner von Wattenwyl, 1878
11. Liotrachela nitida Brunner von Wattenwyl, 1878 - type species
12. Liotrachela philippina Brunner von Wattenwyl, 1878 (3 subspecies)
13. Liotrachela styligera Karny, 1926
14. Liotrachela taeniistyla Karny, 1931
