= Carl Geigy =

Carl Geigy or Karl Geigy may refer to:

- Karl Geigy (politician) (1798–1861), Swiss merchant and politician, co-founder of the Swiss Central Railway
- Carl Geigy (philanthropist) (1860–1943), Swiss businessman and philanthropist, his grandson
