= Karl Brunner (died 1867) =

Swiss chemist (1796–1867)

- Born: Carl Emanuel Brunner; 25 January 1796; Bern, Old Swiss Confederacy
- Died: 22 March 1867 (aged 71); Bern, Switzerland
- Occupations: Chemist; pharmacist; landscape painter
- Spouse: Maria Klara Charlotte Otth
- Children: Carl Brunner von Wattenwyl
- Parents: Samuel Brunner (father); Maria Leüw (mother)
- Relatives: Samuel Brunner (brother); Felix Sarasin the Younger (son-in-law)

Karl Brunner (baptismal name Carl Emanuel Brunner; 25 January 1796 – 22 March 1867) was a Swiss chemist and pharmacist from Bern. He founded the chemical laboratory in Bern in 1819 and was professor of chemistry in Bern from 1821, from 1834 to 1861 at the University of Bern. In 1857 he was the first to obtain manganese in compact, metallic form. He was also a landscape painter.

== Biography ==
Karl Brunner was born on 25 January 1796 in Bern, the son of Samuel Brunner, a member of the Grand Council and landowner, and Maria Leüw. His brother was Samuel Brunner. He married Maria Klara Charlotte Otth. His son was Carl Brunner von Wattenwyl, and in 1848 his daughter Rosalie married Felix Sarasin the Younger.

In 1816 Brunner completed his apprenticeship as a pharmacist and joined the Swiss Society of Natural Sciences (Schweizerische Naturforschende Gesellschaft). He studied pharmacy in Bern, Berlin, Göttingen and Paris, and obtained a doctorate (Dr. phil.). From 1821 he was full professor of chemistry at the academy in Bern, and from 1834 to 1861 full professor of chemistry and pharmacy at the University of Bern. He was dean from 1838 to 1842 and rector in 1836–1837.

Brunner founded the chemical laboratory in 1819 and modernized it, and he broke new ground in research and teaching. In 1857 he was the first to obtain manganese in compact, metallic form. As a landscape painter, he was a member of the Bern artists' society (Bernische Künstlergesellschaft) from 1837. In 1835 the University of Basel awarded him an honorary doctorate. He died in Bern on 22 March 1867.

== Bibliography ==
- B. Strahlmann, "Carl Emanuel Brunner (1796–1867) und die Anfänge des chemischen Unterrichts an der Berner Hochschule", in Chimia 21, 1967, 566–572
- Die Dozenten der bernischen Hochschule, 1984
- Hochschulgeschichte Berns 1528–1984, 1984

=== Archives ===
- Graphische Sammlung ETH Zürich, Zurich: artistic papers (künstlerischer Nachlass)
