= Frisching Faience Manufactory =

Swiss faience manufactory (1760–1776)

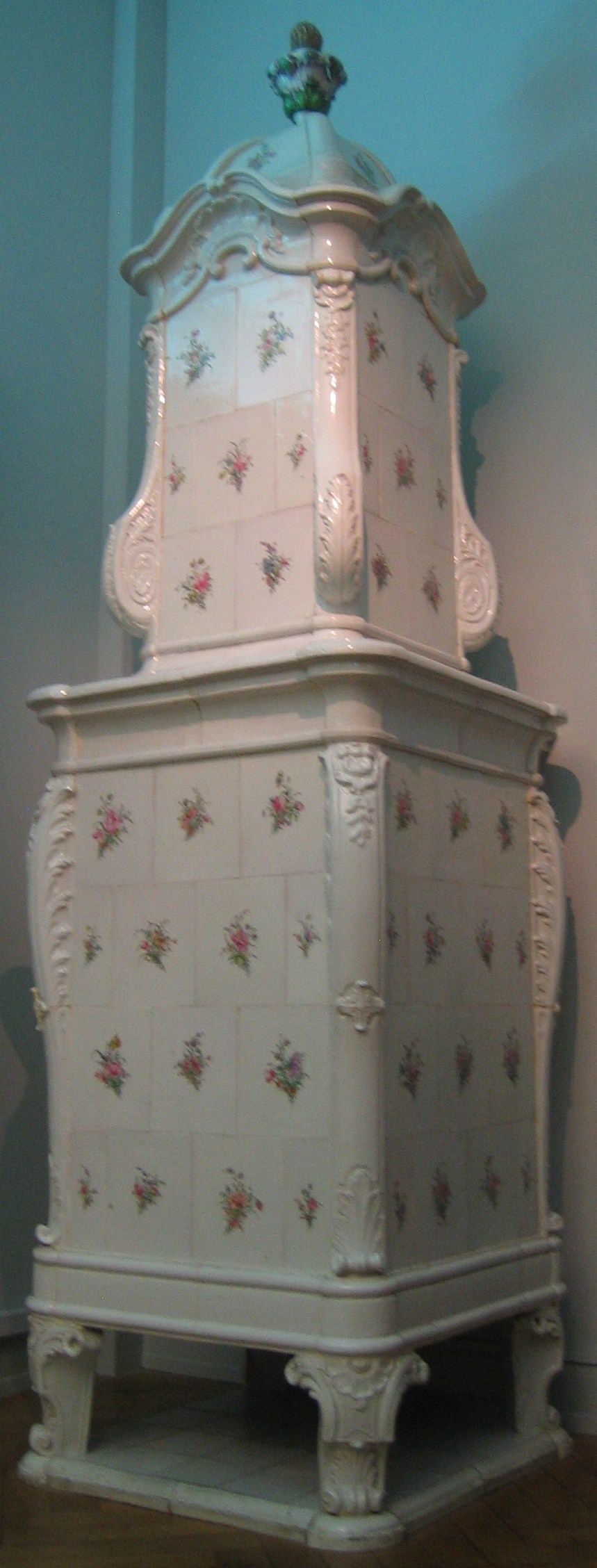
Faience stove produced by the Frisching Faience Manufactory. This faience stove was part of the interior of The White House (Wendelstörferhof) of the Sarasin family of Basel. Today this faience stove is exhibited in the Historical Museum of Bern

The Frisching Faience Manufactory was a manufactory that produced high class faience manufactures between 1760 and 1776 in Bern, Switzerland.

== History ==
The manufactory was founded by Franz Rudolf Frisching and his brothers Gabriel Friedrich (1731–1789) and Karl Albrecht (1734–1801) on the grounds of Franz Rudolf Frisching’s country estate, the Lorraine Gut, outside the Old City of Bern. The manufactory specialised in faience stoves. Because of protectionism the manufactory could not sell one faience stove in the city of Bern. However, the faience stoves of the Frisching Faience Manufactory were very popular with the patricians of Basel and the French-speaking part of Switzerland.

== Locations ==
Locations with faience stoves made by the Frisching Faience Manufactory

- Historical Museum of Bern
- Schloss Schadau in Thun
- Schloss Hünigen in Konolfingen
- The Blue and The White House in Basel
- Le Palais du Peyrou in Neuchâtel

== Literature ==
- Walter A. Staehelin: Keramische Forschungen aus bernischen Archiven. In: Keramikfreunde der Schweiz: Mitteilungsblatt. Nr. 81 (1970), S. 3–34.
- Robert L. Wyss: Kachelöfen, in: Bern und die bildenden Künste, in: Illustrierte Berner Enzyklopädie, Bd. IV. Kunst und Kultur im Kanton Bern, Bern 1987, S. 107-109.
- Historisches Museum Bern: Geschirr für Stadt und Land – Berner Töpferei seit dem 16. Jahrhundert, Bern, 2007, ISBN 978-3-9523573-8-5 (BHM).
