= Palazzo Vertemate-Franchi, Valchiavenna =

Palazzo Vertemate-Franchi
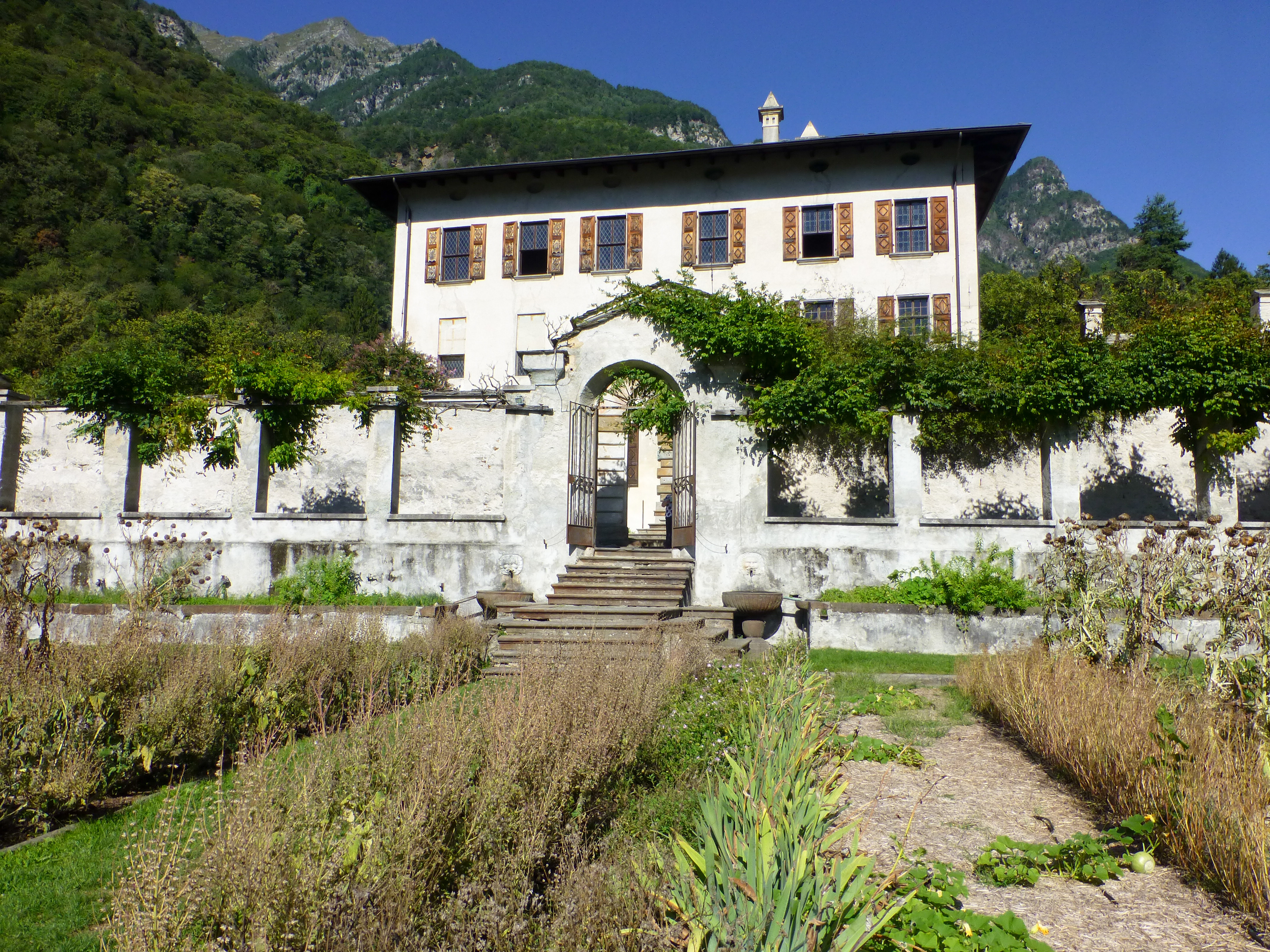
- Palazzo Vertemate-Franchi in 2019
- Click on the map for a fullscreen view

General information
- Location: Piuro, Italy
- Coordinates: 46°19′53.87″N 9°25′24.82″E

The Palazzo Vertemate-Franchi is best described as a villa due to its rural position in the Valchiavenna in the province of Sondrio in the region of Lombardy, Italy. The nearby original town of Piuro was destroyed during a landslide on August 25, 1618; and the property is administered by the comune of Chiavenna.

The Villa was built in the 16th century by the family of Guglielmo and Luigi Vertemate Franchi, and remained their property for centuries until the 1879. One source cites construction in 1577. In 1902, the property was purchased by the antiquarian Napoleone Brianzi of Milan. He prevented the sale of two of the frescoed ceilings, and attempted to restore the palace, adding period furniture from other properties. After 1937, it was bought by A. Feltrinelli and L. Bonomi, who struggled to maintain the property. In 1988, the palace became the host of the Museum of the Comune of Chiavenna. They have sought to maintain the villa and the surrounding vineyards.

The interiors are extensively frescoed with mythologic themes (dated to 1577). Two canvases include a view of the town of Priuro prior to the landslide. The architects remain unknown. The frescoes, have been attributed to either the Campi Family; Giovanni Battista Castello, known as il Bergamasco; Aurelio Luini; Giuseppe Meda; or Lattanzio Gambara.

The fresco subjects are inspired by the Metamorphoses by Ovid. The include frescoes in the Hall of Jupiter and Mercury, with Juno and her chariot. There is a Hall of Perseus with members of the Vertemate family. Other rooms depict allegories of the arts and signs of the zodiac.
