= Krompachy =

Krompachy Krombach
- Municipality
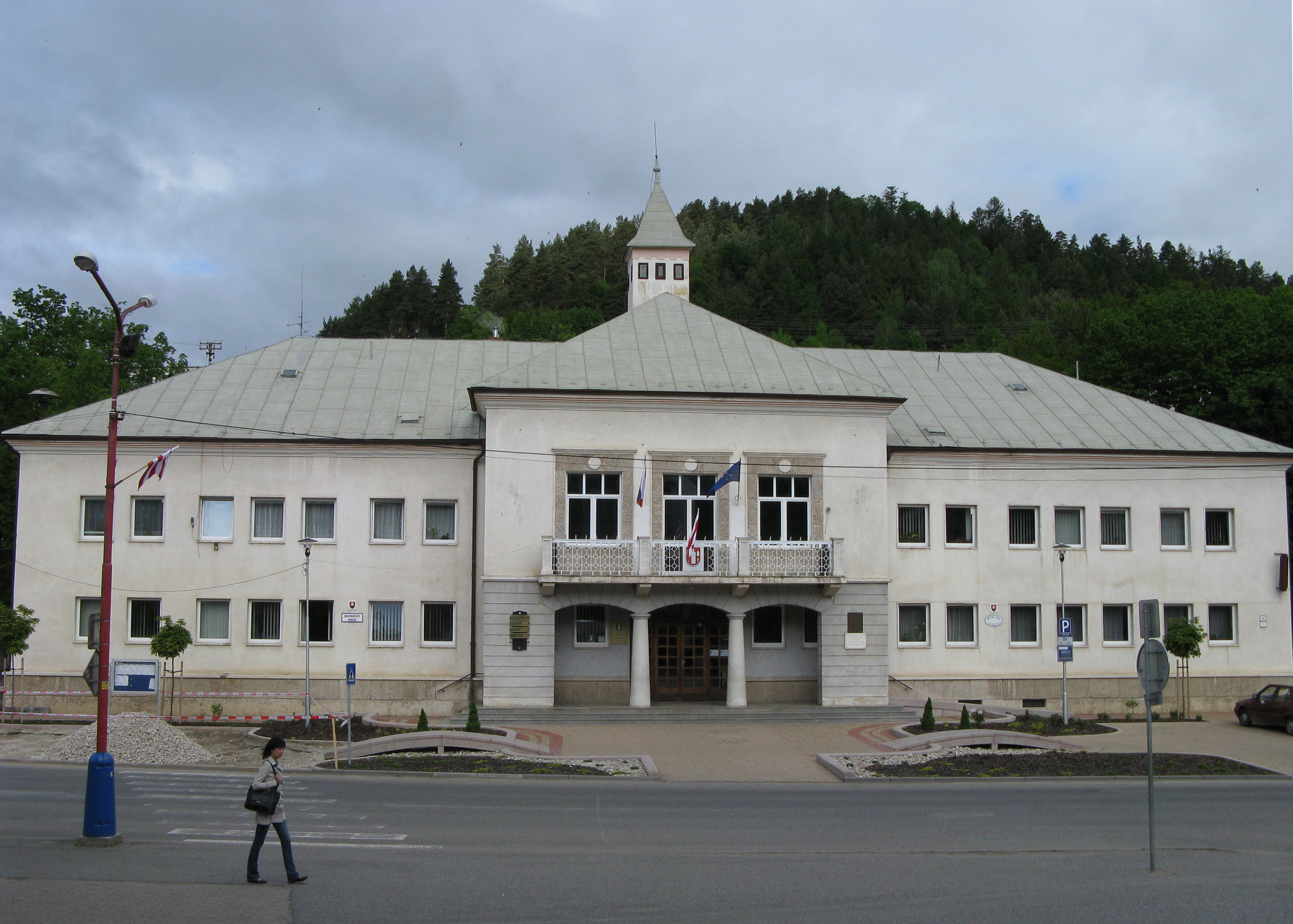
- Krompachy City hall

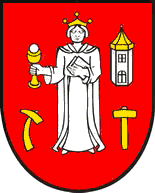
- Flag Coat of arms

- Location of Krompachy in the Košice Region Location of Krompachy in Slovakia
- Coordinates: 48.91°N 20.87°E
- Country: Slovakia
- Region: Košice Region
- District: Spišská Nová Ves District
- First mentioned: 1246

Government
  - Mayor: Dárius Dubiňák

Area
  - Total: 22.83 km^{2} (8.81 sq mi)
- Elevation: 375 m (1,230 ft)

Population (2025)
  - Total: 8,533
- Time zone: UTC+1 (CET)
  - Summer (DST): UTC+2 (CEST)
- Postal code: 534 1
- Area code: +421 53
- Vehicle registration plate (until 2022): SN
- Website: www.krompachy.sk

Krompachy (German: Krombach, Hungarian: Korompa) is a town in Slovakia, with a rich mining and metallurgical history, well-known both in Slovakia and in its close neighboring countries for its Plejsy ski center.

== History ==
The town was first mentioned in 1282 in a charter by King Ladislaus IV as belonging to the domain of Spiš Castle. The town's name derives from German (Krumm Bach - crooked stream), as the town was settled by German colonists.

From then onwards, it was a centre of mining and metallurgy until the end of the 20th century, particularly focussed on the iron and copper industries. At the start of the 20th century, the Krompachy Ironworks (Krompašská železiareň) had around 3,500 employees and was the biggest ironworks of its time in the Kingdom of Hungary. The Ironworks closed after World War I.

In 1921, there was a bloody uprising, known as the Krompachy Uprising (Slovak: Krompašská vzbura) in the town.

Since 1991, following the industrial decline and as a result of large-scale investment, Plejsy became an internationally visited alpine ski centre and became known as a holiday destination.

== Tourism ==
As well as the skiing centre at Plejsy, Krompachy is known for its scenery of hills, valleys and fields. This, together with a number of local natural and cultural sites, has made the town a year-round tourist destination.

=== Sites ===
- Roman Catholic church of Evangelic Saint John, built in the classical style from 1774
- 17th-century baroque curia reconstructed into a private hotel
- Krompachy Uprising monument
- The administrative building of the former ironworks
- Eastern Slovakia's first water plant

== Geography ==
The municipality lies at an altitude of 375 metres (1,230 ft) and covers an area of 22.83 km^{2} (8.81 sq mi) (2025). It is situated in the central Spiš area in the valley of the Hornád River. The town lies on the meeting point of three mountain ranges; the Levoča Hills (Levočské vrchy) and Branisko Massif (the highest point is Slubica 1,129 metres (3,704 ft) above sea level) are to the north and the Volovec Mountains (Volovské vrchy) (part of the Slovenské rudohorie Mountains) are to the south. The town is surrounded on every side by mountain massifs, with summits 900 to 1,100 metres (2,953–3,609 feet) above sea level.

The annual rainfall in the Hornád Basin (Hornádska Kotlina) is between 590 to 800 millimetres (23–31 in). The rainiest month is July and the driest is February. Snow covers the area 75–90 days a year. The average annual temperature is 6.8 °C (44.2 °F), the lowest in January at −6.2 °C (20.8 °F), the highest in July at 17.0 °C (62.6 °F).

The large conifer and mixed forests are home to red deer, boars, wolves, lynxes, and badgers. The forests are rich in mushrooms and wild forest fruits. The Hornád River is the home of trout, salmon, grayling and eel.

== Population ==
Historical population
Year	Pop.	±%
1970	6,250	—
1980	6,927	+10.8%
1991	8,252	+19.1%
2001	8,812	+6.8%
2011	8,758	−0.6%
2021	8,615	−1.6%
Source: Censuses

Population statistic (10 years)
Year	1995	2005	2015	2025
Count	8521	8872	8895	8533
Difference		+4.11%	+0.25%	−4.06%

Population statistic
Year	2024	2025
Count	8587	8533
Difference		−0.62%

It has a population of 8533 people (31 December 2025).

=== Ethnicity ===
Census 2021 (1+ %)
Ethnicity	Number	Fraction
Slovak	7558	86.48%
Romani	1639	18.75%
Not found out	990	11.32%
Total	8739	

In year 2021 was 8739 people by ethnicity 7558 as Slovak, 1639 as Romani, 990 as Not found out, 68 as Rusyn, 46 as Czech, 19 as Other, 15 as Polish, 9 as Russian, 6 as German, 5 as Moravian, 5 as Hungarian, 5 as Bulgarian, 3 as Ukrainian, 2 as Vietnamese and 1 as Turkish.

Note on population: The difference values of population numbers in the table "Population statistic" and in the sections "Ethnicity" & "Religion" is caused by the use of various statistical methods.

=== Religion ===
Census 2021 (1+ %)
Religion	Number	Fraction
Roman Catholic Church	4710	53.9%
None	2285	26.15%
Not found out	1081	12.37%
Eastern Orthodox Church	205	2.35%
Greek Catholic Church	178	2.04%
Evangelical Church	113	1.29%
Total	8739	

In year 2021 was 8739 people by religion 4710 from Roman Catholic Church, 2285 from None, 1081 from Not found out, 205 from Eastern Orthodox Church, 178 from Greek Catholic Church, 113 from Evangelical Church, 45 from Apostolic Church, 30 from Other and not ascertained christian church, 23 from Ad hoc movements, 18 from Christian Congregations in Slovakia, 10 from Other, 9 from Buddhism, 8 from Jehovah's Witnesses, 7 from Islam, 6 from Calvinist Church, 4 from Old Catholic Church, 3 from United Methodist Church, 1 from Paganism and natural spirituality, 1 from Hinduism, 1 from Czechoslovak Hussite Church and 1 from Baptists Church.

== Economy ==
The town's mainly industrial character is the result of the terrain. Matsushita, a producer of Panasonic goods, is the biggest company in the region, which also is the location of the Slovak Electrotechnical Company factory that produces a wide range of machines for industrial and domestic use.

There are still some iron and copper industrials active in the area such as Zlieváreň SEZ Krompachy a foundry that produces cast iron parts for industrial and domestic use.

== Healthcare ==
Krompachy has a hospital with the following departments: surgery, emergency, gynecology and obstetrics, internal, as well as dermatology. There are six non-state healthcare institutions in the town, which together with two drug stores provide complete healthcare services.

== Education and Culture ==
The town has three elementary schools, an elementary school of art, and a specialised elementary school. The town's leisure time center helps children and teenagers to spend their leisure time in a good way by organizing different interest clubs. The town is the home to a secondary grammar school and an apprentice-training center for electrical engineering. The center of cultural events is the municipal cultural center, part of which is a brass ensemble with 90 years of tradition, the Workers Chorus and Krompašan and Krompašánek folk troops. One of the four majorette groups is internationally acknowledged. The center is the residence of the town library with its 29,000 titles. The Cantica Christiana mixed choir is part of the Roman Catholic Church.

== Sport ==
The Town Sports Club is the place of sports events. This center gathers table tennis, karate, cycloturist, WPEU, ice hockey, and triathlon-duathlon-marathon groups. The Football club having 3rd league ambitions and the Basketball club after its 1st league performance are active too. For athletes the following sites are available: Plejsy ski center, football stadium on SNP Street, gymnasium and swimming pool on Maurerova Street, tennis court on Trangusova Street, a natural ice rink on SNP Street, as well a multi-function table tennis court on the area of the secondary grammar school and the IN-LINE park.

== Twin towns — sister cities ==
Krompachy is twinned with:

- Békéscsaba, Hungary
- Gaszowice, Poland
- Nădlac, Romania
- Ozimek, Poland
- Rýmařov, Czech Republic

== Notable people from Krompachy ==
- Vavrinec Koch (1442–1475) humanist scientist, professor of the Universitas Istropolitana and Vienna University, philosopher and theologian
- Július Gundlefinger (1833–1894) Spis and Šaris landscape painter, nobleman
- Zeno Csaky (1840–1905) head of the Spis administration from 1896
- Ľudovit Tetmajer (German: Ludwig von Tetmajer; 1850–1905) technician, inventor, university professor, and construction expert
- Július Mauer (1896–1961) politician and prime minister
- Tibor Honty (1907–1968) internationally renowned photographer
- Jozef Fabini (1908–1984) painter and art historian
- Július Barč-Ivan (1909–1953) dramatist, writer and publicist
- Mikuláš Šprinc (1914–1985) poet, founder of Catholic modernism, educationalist, writer, and translator
- Ludwig Eisenberg (1916–2006) holocaust survivor
- Bartolomej Urbanec (1918–1983) composer, folklorist, conductor of SĽUK and Lúčnica orchestras
- Jozef Hodorovský (1921-2005) actor and educationalist
- Ján Kvasnička (1927) professor, historian, chancellor of the Comenius University in Bratislava
- Ondrej Lenárd (1942) world-famous conductor, director of leading Slovak orchestras, conductor of the Tokio Shynsei Nippon Symphony Orchestra
- Milan Pazout (1948) olympian, world champion in all alpine ski disciplines
