= Parapsyra =

Scientific classification
- Kingdom: Animalia
- Phylum: Arthropoda
- Class: Insecta
- Order: Orthoptera
- Suborder: Ensifera
- Family: Tettigoniidae
- Subfamily: Phaneropterinae
- Genus: Calopsyra
- Subgenus: Parapsyra; Carl, 1914

Genus of cricket-like animals

External image
- Image at iNaturalist

Parapsyra is a subgenus of Asian bush crickets in the genus Calopsyra: in the tribe Holochlorini and subfamily Phaneropterinae.

== Species ==
The Orthoptera Species File lists the following species recorded from Indo-China, China and Malesia:

1. Calopsyra (Parapsyra) brevicauda Liu, 2011
2. Calopsyra (Parapsyra) fuscomarginalis Liu & Kang, 2006
3. Calopsyra (Parapsyra) midcarina Liu & Kang, 2006
4. Calopsyra (Parapsyra) nigrocornis Liu & Kang, 2006
5. Calopsyra (Parapsyra) nigrovittata Xia & Liu, 1992
6. Calopsyra (Parapsyra) notabilis (Carl, 1914) (prev. type: locality Phúc Sơn, central Vietnam)
