= Ludwig von Tetmajer =

Swiss physicist and engineer

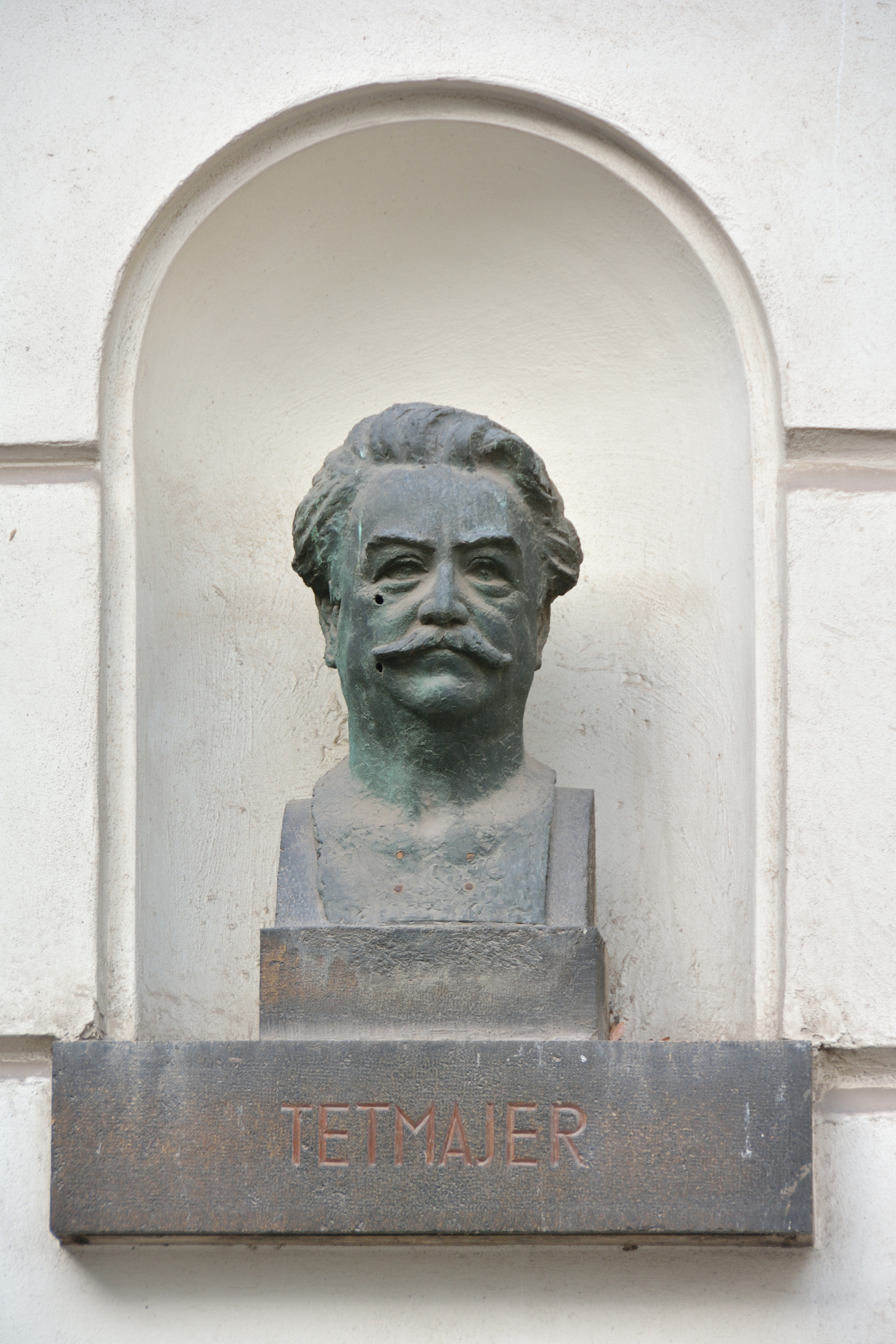
- Bust at Vienna University of Technology
- Born: 14 July 1850; Krompachy, Upper Hungary
- Died: 1 February 1905 (aged 54); Vienna, Austria

Ludwig von Tetmajer (14 July 1850, Krompachy, Upper Hungary - 1 February 1905, Vienna, Austria) was a professor at the Eidgenössischen Polytechnikum, the fore-runner of modern ETH in Zurich. Tetmajer was a pioneer in the development of the research laboratories for determining the physical and mechanical properties of the construction materials and a co-founder of the Festigkeitsprüfungsanstalt, the modern Eidgenossische Materialprüfungs- und Forschungsanstalt (Empa) of Switzerland.

== Life ==
Ludwig Tetmajer was born as the second child of Władysław Tetmajer, director of the iron-works in Krompachy (Upper Hungary) and Luise Elsner. They belonged to the Austro-Swiss branch of the Tetmajer family. His cousins, novelist Kazimierz Przerwa-Tetmajer and painter Włodzimierz Tetmajer, belonged to the Polish branch of the family. He spent his childhood in the vicinity of the iron-works what decisively influenced his life. In 1867 he finished his secondary education cum laude and after a one-year preparatory study he enrolled at the Faculty of Engineering at the Eidgenössischen Polytechnikum in Zurich, Switzerland. In 1872, at the age of 22, he finished his education as a building engineer with the highest marks.

Tetmajer first worked as an intern with the Swiss Northeastern Railway. In 1873, he became an assistant of Carl Culmann from the chair of Statics at the Eidgenössischen Polytechnikum and later the same year became a Privatdozent for the Building Mechanics.

In 1875, he was conscripted and served for a year with the 66th Austro-Hungarian infantry regiment. In order to gain Swiss citizenship he left the army in 1877 as a reserve officer of the 34th infantry regiment.

Having been granted the Swiss citizenship, he married the opera singer Maria Luise Kindermann (3 March 1852 - 22 June 1912), the daughter of the opera singer August Kindermann on 24 October 1877 in Munich. They had three children: Elsa (born 26 August 1878), August Helmar Rudolf (12 January 1880 - 14 July 1946), an architect and a chronicler of the family, and Bruno Friedrich (born 17 June 1887), a chemist. In 1878, Tetmajer was appointed an extraordinary professor at the Zurich Polytechnic Institute. In 1880 he was appointed a provisional director of the Festigkeitsprüfungsanstalt and from 1 February 1881 a permanent director of that institution and an ordinary professor for the Building mechanics. He was the president of the newly founded International association for the material testing from 1896.

In 1901, he was appointed Professor of the Technical Mechanics and the Building Materials at Vienna University of Technology, resigning as the head of the Festigkeitsprüfungsanstalt and as a professor at ETH. Tetmajer suffered a stroke on 31 January 1905 and died the following day.

== Achievements ==
- Participation in various railway projects, notably the work on the Gotthard rail line,
- Investigation into the causes of the Münchenstein rail disaster, the largest rail accident in Europe at the time, caused by the collapse of a railway bridge. The bridge was built by Gustave Eiffel at Münchenstein, Switzerland in 1891,
- Formulation of the Tetmajer's expression in 1886; an extension of the Euler's buckling theorem for slender bars as a result of the investigation of the Münchenstein rail bridge accident,
- Foundation of the material testing facility at the ETH in Zurich, modern EMPA, as an international centre for the testing of building materials,
- A monograph Methods and results of wires and ropes testing including his patent for the sealing rope ends and for manufacturing of ropes of various specifications,
- Introduction of the post-graduate level of study to the Technical University of Vienna, Austria and so qualitatively improving the technical education there,
- Invention of the Tetmajer's sieve, Tetmajer's volumeter and Tetmajer's press.
