= Schloss Ebenrain =

Country residence in Sissach, Switzerland

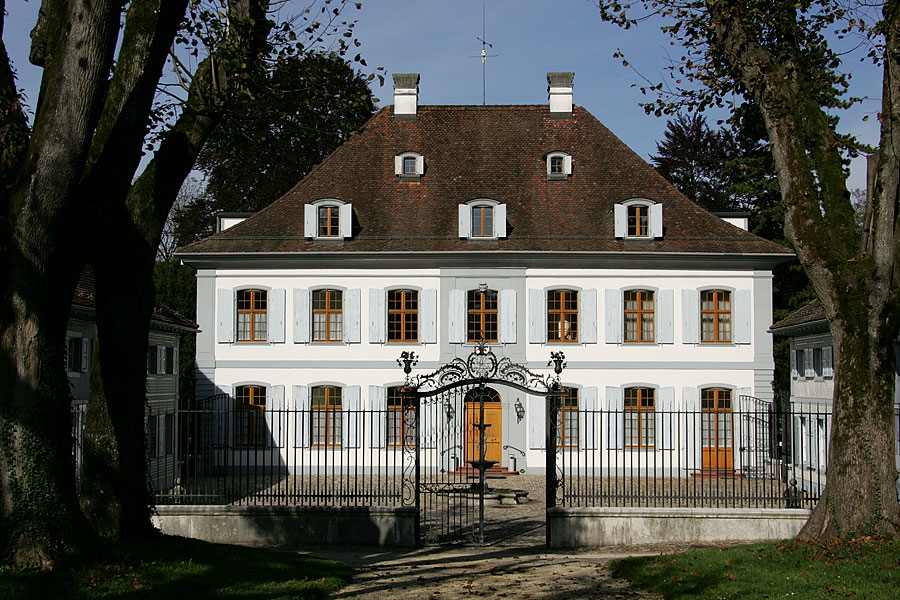
- Schloss Ebenrain in Sissach

- Location within Switzerland

General information
- Status: Preserved
- Location: Sissach
- Coordinates: 47°27′51″N 7°48′18″E
- Construction started: 1774
- Completed: 1776

Schloss Ebenrain (German pronunciation: [ˌʃlɔs ˈeːbn̩ˌraɪn]) is a former country residence in Sissach, in the canton of Basel-Country, Switzerland. Built in 1774–1776, it is considered the most significant late baroque residence in northwestern Switzerland. It is now a public facility and the site of an agricultural school. It is listed as a Swiss cultural property of national significance.

== History ==
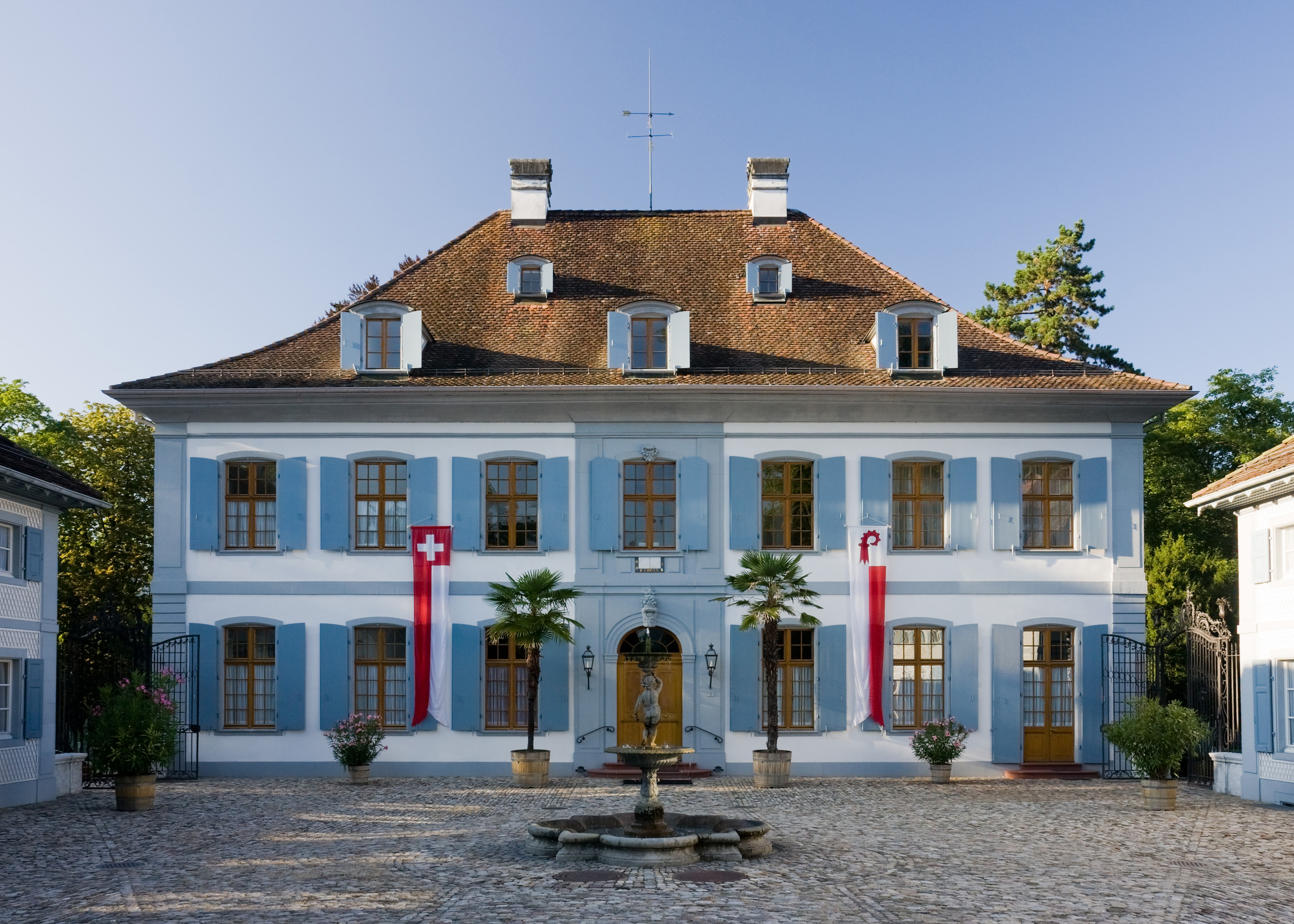
Ebenrain Castle

Schloss Ebenrain was built as a summer residence for the wealthy Basel silk ribbon manufacturer and trader Martin Bachofen and his family. The Basel architect Samuel Werenfels designed the building. Bachofen intended at first to build a modest country residence, but changed his plans and built a luxurious estate. The gardens to the north and south of the residence were designed by Bernese architect Niklaus Sprüngli. Both gardens were converted to fashionable English parks in the early 19th century, but one landscape feature, namely the parallel rows of lindens lining the drive to the house, has remained essentially unchanged to the present day.

=== Changes of ownership (1817–1872) ===
Elite Basel families typically stayed in the country from May to September, but Bachofen often extended his stays at Ebenrain until the end of hunting season in January or February. Bachofen died in 1814, and in 1817 his widow, Margaretha, sold Schloss Ebenrain to another Basel merchant, Johann Rudolf Ryhiner-Streckeisen. Seven years later the estate's new owner committed suicide at Ebenrain. Ryhiner was facing charges of bigamy, and on 29 July 1824 he killed himself with a pistol.

In 1836 Ryhiner's widow sold Schloss Ebenrain to Ludwig Vest, a businessman from Liestal. In 1838 Vest transferred the estate to Lukas Vischer, an art collector from Basel who had just returned from several years' residence in Mexico. Vischer died at Ebenrain in December 1840.

In 1849 the Vischer family sold Schloss Ebenrain to a Prussian military officer, Major Leopold von Orlich, who sold it the following year to Ernst Wilhelm Wilding, Prince Radali of Sicily. In 1857 Johannes David-Sickeler of Basel acquired it, and in 1860 it went to Charles Philibert Gobat, former minister of Tramelan in the Canton of Bern. Gobat, who had a large family, was in financial difficulties by March 1872, when he sold the estate to Albert Hübner-Allan from Mühlhausen. Hübner was a Moscow textile merchant who had settled in the border province of Alsace but decided to leave after the Franco-Prussian War, when the province went to Germany.

=== Renovations ===
Hübner made several significant changes to Ebenrain, adding tracts of land to the estate and hiring landscape architect Édouard André to transform Ebenrain's surroundings and add outbuildings, most of which are now dismantled. Hübner also hired an Alsatian farm manager and expanded the farming operation at Ebenrain.

==== Second Empire phase ====
Hübner decided to transform Schloss Ebenrain to suit the Second Empire style. He expanded the main building, transformed the interior, and had the exterior painted beige.

Hübner died in 1890. Upon his widow's death in 1911 the estate passed to the couple's oldest daughter, Marie Eugénie Catherine, wife of the French vice admiral and diplomat Charles Philippe Touchard.

==== Restoring the Baroque style ====
In 1930 Touchard died at Ebenrain. His heirs promptly sold the estate to a Basel merchant, Rudolf Staechelin-Finkbeiner, who renovated the house and used it to display his acclaimed collection of modern French paintings. Staechelin himself took up residence in an outbuilding.

Both the Touchards and Staechelin had taken steps to remove some of Hübner's innovations and restore Ebenrain's baroque character. The exterior walls went from beige back to blue-gray. Staechelin devoted nine years to a comprehensive renovation, but he made no structural changes to the house.

After Staechelin suffered a stroke in 1946, his son, Peter Gregor Staechelin, offered to sell Schloss Ebenrain to the Canton of Basel-Country. The sale was completed in 1951. For decades the cantonal government confined its restoration efforts to furnishing the interior appropriately. Finally between 1986 and 1989 both the interior and exterior of the residence were restored to their baroque character. At the same time, the top (roof-level) floor was converted to a large exhibition room, the cellar was expanded, and the entire house was made accessible by wheelchair.

=== Public ownership ===
The cantonal government has owned Schloss Ebenrain since 1951. The building and its surrounding park have been used for public art exhibitions, concerts, and other functions.

The farm associated with the castle was detached and administered separately as an agricultural school, Landwirtschaftliches Zentrum Ebenrain.

== Access ==
Since the elevation of a highway in 1967, Schloss Ebenrain and its park appear to be cut off from the town of Sissach. The residence is still accessible on foot or by bicycle, however, and the route from the Sissach train station to Ebenrain is marked by signposts.

The entire building has been accessible for people with disabilities since 1989.

== See also ==
- List of castles in Switzerland
