= Johann Bernhard Burckhardt =

Swiss politician (1645–1740)

- Portrait
- Born: 25 November 1645; Basel, Old Swiss Confederacy
- Died: 13 May 1740 (aged 94); Basel, Old Swiss Confederacy
- Occupations: Politician; military officer
- Spouse: Charlotte Antoinette Schmidtmann (m. 1684)
- Father: Johann Balthasar Burckhardt
- Relatives: Hans Bernhard Sarasin (grandson)

Johann Bernhard Burckhardt (25 November 1645 – 13 May 1740) was a Swiss politician and military officer from Basel, a member of the Burckhardt family. After serving as a captain in France until 1690, he was bailiff of Münchenstein from 1695 to 1703, a member of the council of Basel from 1704 and one of the Thirteen from 1706 to 1739. In 1712 he became the first colonel of the Basel rural militia.

== Biography ==
Johann Bernhard Burckhardt was born on 25 November 1645 in Basel, the son of Johann Balthasar Burckhardt, one of the Thirteen (Dreizehner). In 1684 he married Charlotte Antoinette Schmidtmann, daughter of Johann Jakob Schmidtmann, a French lieutenant colonel. His grandson was Hans Bernhard Sarasin.

Until 1690 Burckhardt was the captain of a battalion in France. He then returned to Basel, where in 1691 he became one of the Six (Sechser) of the winegrowers' guild (Rebleutenzunft). From 1695 to 1703 he was bailiff (Obervogt) of Münchenstein. From 1704 he was a member of the council (Ratsherr) of Basel, and from 1706 to 1739 one of the Thirteen. In 1712 he became the first colonel of the Basel rural militia (Landmiliz). He undertook important diplomatic missions, among others to the French court. He died in Basel on 13 May 1740.

== Bibliography ==
- N. Röthlin, Die Basler Handelspolitik und deren Träger in der zweiten Hälfte des 17. und im 18. Jahrhundert, 1986, 336 f.
