= Vertemate family =

Noble family of Milan and Plurs

Vertemate family Vertemate-Franchi
- Noble family
- Origin: Milan
- Founded: 1130 (byname di Vertemate)
- Founder: Hospinius della Porta
- Connected families: Salis-Soglio
- Estate: Renaissance palace in Cortinaccia
- Branches: Werthemann (Basel, from 1583); Vertemate-Franchi (died out at the beginning of the 20th century)

The Vertemate family (also Vertemate-Franchi) was a noble family originally from Milan. Around 1217 a member of the family settled in Plurs (Piuro), at the entrance to the Bregaglia valley, and the family became wealthy through the forwarding trade. A merchant of the Reformed branch moved to Basel in 1583, where the name was Germanized to Werthemann in the 17th century; the Catholic Vertemate-Franchi branch died out at the beginning of the 20th century.

== History ==
The noble family originally came from Milan. Its progenitor is considered to be Hospinius della Porta, who took the byname di Vertemate after acquiring the lordship rights (Herrschaftsrechte) of Vertemate in 1130. Around 1217 the podestà Ruggero settled in Plurs, at the entrance to the Bregaglia valley. Thanks to the forwarding trade, customs concessions from Milan and early alliances with the Salis-Soglio family, the Vertemate became wealthy.

Part of the family became Reformed. This branch included the merchant Bernardino, who according to the Rechenbuoch (account book) of 1593 traded across Europe. The merchant Achilles, of the same branch, moved his residence to Basel in 1583, where the name was Germanized to Werthemann in the 17th century. The Basel line produced textile manufacturers and bankers.

The Catholic Vertemate were distinguished from the Reformed branch by the byname Franchi, after a Lanfrancus. Around 1600 members of this group were heavily involved as entrepreneurs in mining in the Grisons, for example in 1606 in Filisur and Disentis, in 1611 in Parpan and before 1618 in the Ferrera valley (Schams). The Vertemate-Franchi branch, in the Renaissance palace in Cortinaccia, which was spared by the Plurs landslide of 1618, died out at the beginning of the 20th century, while the Werthemann family still exists in Basel.

== Bibliography ==
- Schweizerisches Geschlechterbuch, 3, 534
- A. Colombo, La nobile famiglia de Vertemate-Franchi di Piuro, 1969
- H. Krähenbühl, "Eine Kaufmannsfamilie steigt in den Bergbau ein", in Terra Grischuna, 1990, no. 2, 37–39
