= Samuel Brunner =

Swiss physician and naturalist (1790–1844)

- Baptised: 4 November 1790; Bern, Old Swiss Confederacy
- Died: 17 May 1844; Bern, Switzerland
- Occupations: Physician; naturalist
- Parents: Samuel Brunner (father); Maria Leüw (mother)
- Relatives: Karl Brunner (brother)

Samuel Brunner (baptized 4 November 1790 – 17 May 1844) was a Swiss physician and naturalist from Bern. After giving up medicine, he traveled frequently out of botanical and ethnological interest, among other places to Italy and Malta in 1826, to the Crimea in 1831, and to Senegambia and the Cape Verde Islands in 1838.

== Biography ==
Samuel Brunner was baptized on 4 November 1790 in Bern, the son of Samuel Brunner, a member of the Grand Council and landowner, and Maria Leüw. His brother was the chemist Karl Brunner. He did not marry.

In 1813 Brunner obtained a doctorate in medicine at the University of Würzburg and became a military doctor, and in 1814 he obtained his license to practice medicine in Bern (bernisches Arztpatent). He later gave up the medical profession and worked as a naturalist. His botanical and ethnological interests led him to travel frequently, among other places to Italy and Malta in 1826, to the Crimea in 1831, and in 1838 to Senegambia (Senegal and the Gambia) and the Cape Verde Islands. He died in Bern on 17 May 1844.

== Bibliography ==
- A. Wäber, Eine Fussreise vor 60 Jahren, offprint, 1892 (with references to his writings)

=== Archives ===
- Zentral- und Hochschulbibliothek Luzern, Lucerne: personal papers (Nachlass)
