= Bruckgut (Münchenstein) =

Coordinates: 47.5179°N 7.61974°E

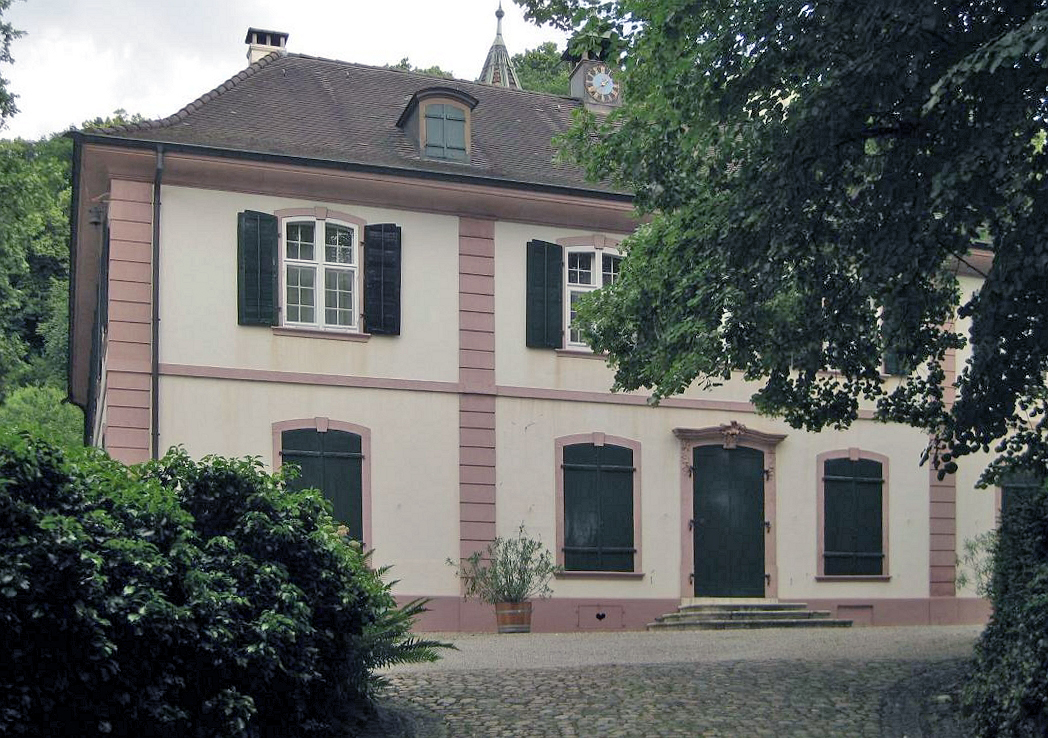
Bruckgut Münchenstein

The Bruckgut estate lies at the foot of the hill, below the village centre of Münchenstein, in the canton of Basel-Country in Switzerland.
The Bruckgut farming estate is listed as a heritage site of national significance.

== Geographical location ==
Up until the end of the 18th century, the lowlands of the river Birs were very sparsely populated. Once where the river meandered its way into the Rhine, is where the modern day Münchenstein spreads itself. The Bruckgut estate lies in the Münchenstein lowlands on the right hand bank of the river Birs. The Bruckgut farmhouse and the barn are on the opposite bank of the river.

== History ==
First an immured manor house with gabled roof stood here. The privately owned estate Bruckgut was built in 1758 for the Basler manufacturer Markus Weiss-Leissler (1696-1768). Next to the estate is a gardeners house. On a high-situated rock above the estate is a pavilion dated 1764.

The most important crossing over the Birs between Basel and Münchenstein up until the mid 18th century was a wooden bridge and tollhouse by the Bruckgut. Prior to the erection of the single-track railway bridge in 1874/75 by Gustave Eiffel the river was straightened and embanked. The opening of the Jurabahn from Basel to Delémont (German: Delsberg) was on September 23, 1875. It is exactly at this point where the Münchenstein rail disaster occurred on 14 June 1891, historically the worst railway accident ever to affect Switzerland.

The farm house and barn were built in 1888 by the famous Swiss Philanthropist Carl Geigy.

== Architecture ==
Samuel Werenfels (1720-1800) designed the estate house.
