= Münchenstein rail disaster =

Railway accident in Switzerland

Coordinates: 47°31′04″N 7°37′06″E

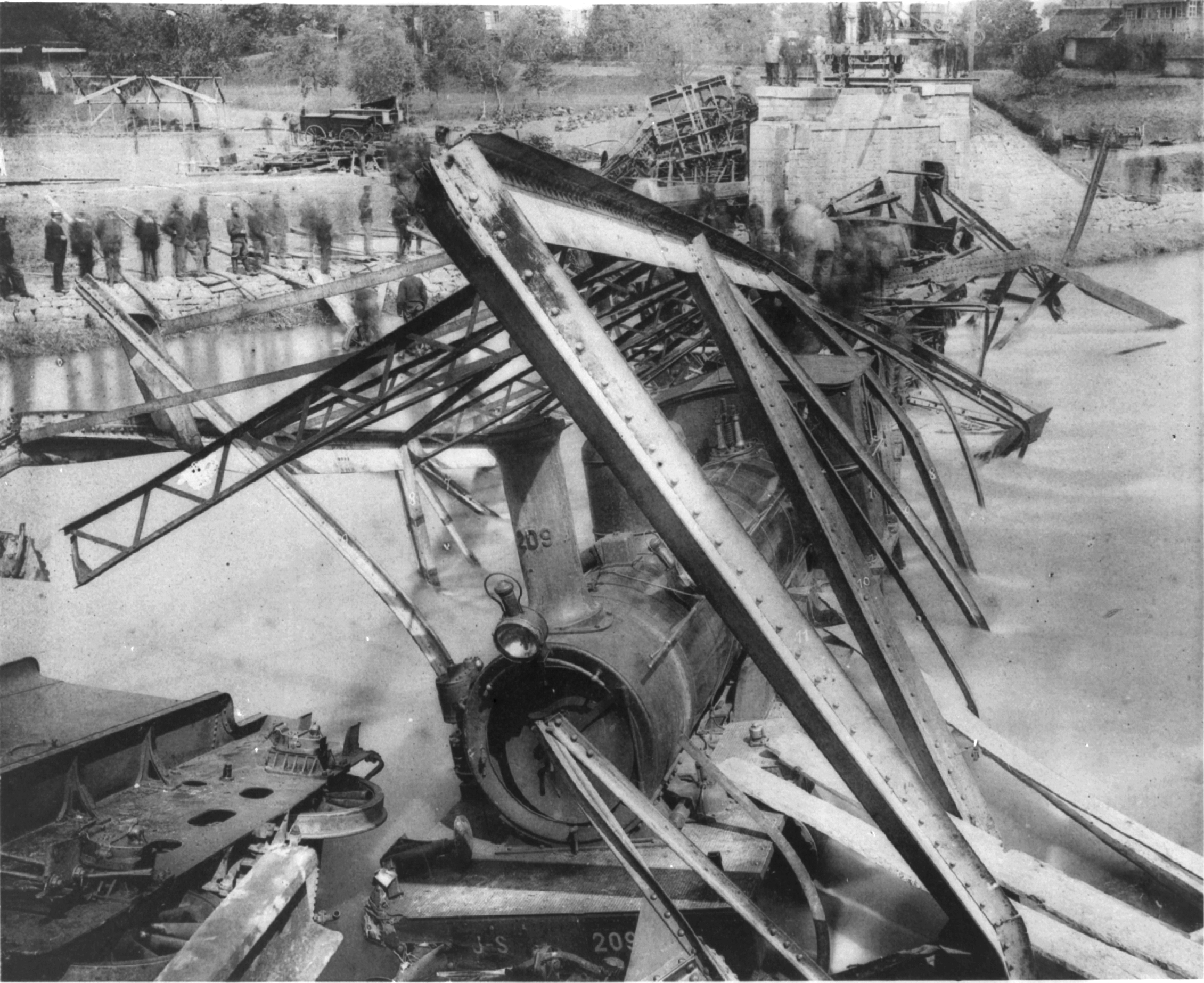
The locomotive in the river.

The Münchenstein rail disaster on 14 June 1891 was historically the worst railway accident ever to affect Switzerland. A crowded passenger train fell through a girder bridge, killing more than seventy people and injuring many others. The accident occurred on the railway line between Basel and Delémont, near the Bruckgut just below the village centre of Münchenstein, as the train was traversing the bridge across the river Birs.

== Bridge ==
The single-track bridge had been built in 1874–75 by Gustave Eiffel (1832–1923), who went on to build the Eiffel Tower in 1889. The contract was given to Eiffel & Cie by the Jurabahn (later Jura–Simplon Railway), a private railway company. Eiffel's engineering company had already acquired the necessary experience, having previously planned and built numerous railway bridges and viaducts in France such as those at Rouzat and Bouble in the Massif Central.

The bridge was composed of wrought iron lattice girders, with an overall length of 42 metres. It crossed the river some five metres above water level at an angle of 51°, and it was completed and put into use in 1875. There were no reasons for complaint, even after serious local floods on the river Birs in 1881, but it was repaired and modified thereafter. One of the abutments was destroyed, leaving the bridge resting on just three points rather than the intended four piers. As one corner sank under its own weight, serious cracks developed. The affected parts were replaced, and further strengthening was done in 1890 after the introduction of heavier locomotives.

== The accident ==
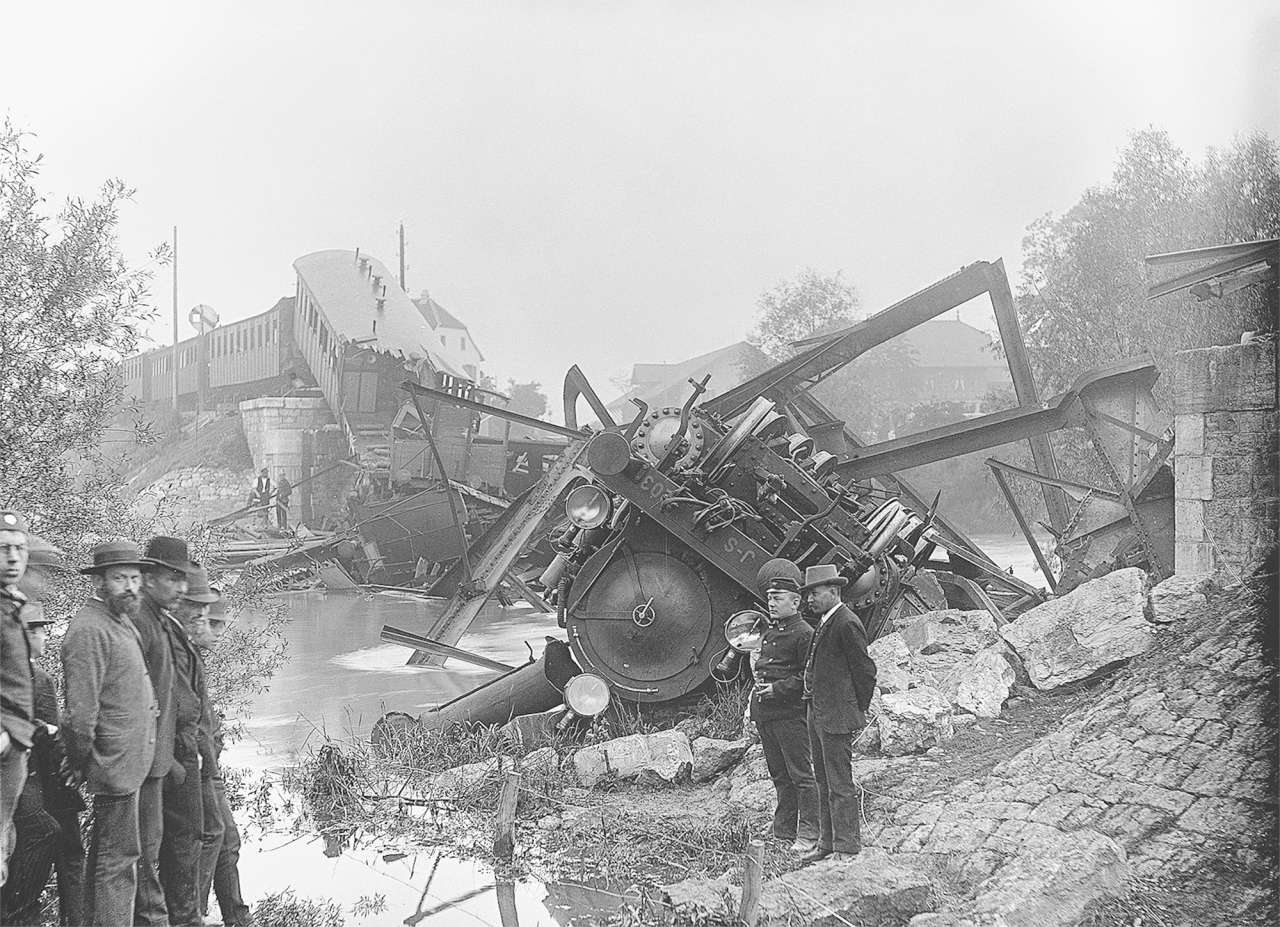
The remaining passenger carriages can be seen on the left side.

On 14 June 1891 at 14:15 a train left the main Basel railway station for Delémont. Owing to the large number of passengers, two supplementary passenger carriages and an additional engine had been added to the train in the last moment. Later, in the findings of the examination report it was estimated that the number of travellers aboard was between 530 and 550.

The disaster occurred as the passenger train, which had been travelling at full speed, applied its brakes as it approached and crossed the bridge, immediately before entering the Münchenstein railway station. Eyewitnesses said that the bridge appeared to break in the centre as the front wheels of the locomotive reached the further abutment. The train did not completely derail and fly off the track during the collapse.

The locomotive at the front, including the two engines, the two additional passenger carriages, a postal carriage, an express carriage and two further passenger carriages, fell into the river. The first two-passenger carriages sank into the river as the following carriages pushed them forwards. A further passenger carriage hung diagonally from the abutment facing downwards towards the river. The final five passenger carriages remained upon the tracks, virtually undamaged.

As the first carriages fell into the river, the air brake system pipes were severed and the brakes in the rear carriages were therefore instantly applied, keeping them standing on the tracks. Most of the passengers in the rear part of the train were uninjured.

The disaster claimed the lives of 73 and seriously injured 171 people.

== Inquiry ==
The subsequent inquiry focused on the state of the bridge, the quality of the ironwork and the design. A new institute, Empa (Swiss Federal Laboratories for Materials Science and Technology), started work in 1880. In its first years of activity, Empa was involved in wide-ranging quality testing of building and structural materials for the Swiss National Exhibition of 1883. Intensive research work by the co-founder and first director, Prof. Ludwig von Tetmajer, gave rise to the first publications on the testing and standardisation of building materials and metals. Tetmajer was also commissioned to investigate the cause of the collapse of the Münchenstein railway bridge, which was responsible for what was at that time the worst railway disaster to have occurred in Europe. His investigation of the collapse revealed that Euler's formula for buckling, which had hitherto been used to calculate design loads in such structures, needed to be corrected for slender bars.

== See also ==
- List of bridge failures
- Lists of rail accidents

== Bibliography ==
- Schneider, A.; Mase, A. (1970). Railway Accidents of Great Britain and Europe. David & Charles.
