= Hans Bernhard Sarasin =

Swiss politician (1731–1822)

- Born: 7 October 1731; Basel, Old Swiss Confederacy
- Died: 14 December 1822 (aged 91); Basel, Switzerland
- Occupation: Politician
- Parents: Philipp Sarasin (father); Elisabeth Burckhardt (mother)
- Relatives: Johann Bernhard Burckhardt (grandfather)

Hans Bernhard Sarasin (7 October 1731 – 14 December 1822) was a Swiss politician from Basel, a member of the Sarasin family. He was a member of the Small Council of Basel from 1794 and an envoy to the Federal Diet, and in 1797 he attended a meeting with Napoleon Bonaparte in Milan. During the Helvetic Republic he withdrew from all offices. From 1803 to 1812 he was again a member of the Small Council and mayor (Bürgermeister) of Basel.

== Biography ==
Hans Bernhard Sarasin was born on 7 October 1731 in Basel, the son of Philipp Sarasin, a linen merchant, and Elisabeth Burckhardt. He was a grandson of Johann Bernhard Burckhardt. He remained unmarried.

Sarasin studied law and history in Leiden and Basel, where he obtained his doctorate. At first he lived as a wealthy private gentleman (Privatier) and devoted himself to his studies; public offices came to him only over time.

From 1764 to 1772 Sarasin was bailiff (Landvogt) in Münchenstein. In 1780 he became a member of the Grand Council, and from 1794 he was a member of the Small Council, where in 1796 he was the deputy (Deputat) for churches and schools. In 1796, 1803 and 1810 he was an envoy to the Federal Diet (Tagsatzung). In 1797 he was one of the Diet's representatives (Repräsentantschaft der Tagsatzung) in Lugano, and in this role he attended a meeting with Napoleon Bonaparte in Milan.

During the Helvetic Republic Sarasin withdrew from all his offices. In 1802–1803 he was the canton's deputy to the Consulta, and from 1803 to 1812 he was again a member of the Small Council and mayor (Bürgermeister). He died in Basel on 14 December 1822.

== Bibliography ==
- F. Sarasin, "Bürgermeister Hans Bernhard Sarasin", in Basler Jahrbuch, 1892, 68–94
- Geschichte der Familie Sarasin in Basel, 1, 1914, 285–354

=== Archives ===
- Basel-Stadt State Archives (Staatsarchiv Basel-Stadt), Basel: personal papers (Nachlass)
