= Stehlin =

Stehlin is a surname. Notable persons by this name include:

- Benoist Stehlin (c.1732–1774), French harpsichord builder
- Hans Georg Stehlin (1870–1941), Swiss paleontologist and geologist
- Johann Jakob Stehlin (1803–1879), Swiss politician
- Karl Rudolf Stehlin (1831–1881), Swiss politician and President of the Swiss Council of States
- Andrew Stehlin, New Zealand actor
