= The Blue and The White House =

Coordinates: 47°33′30″N 7°35′22″E

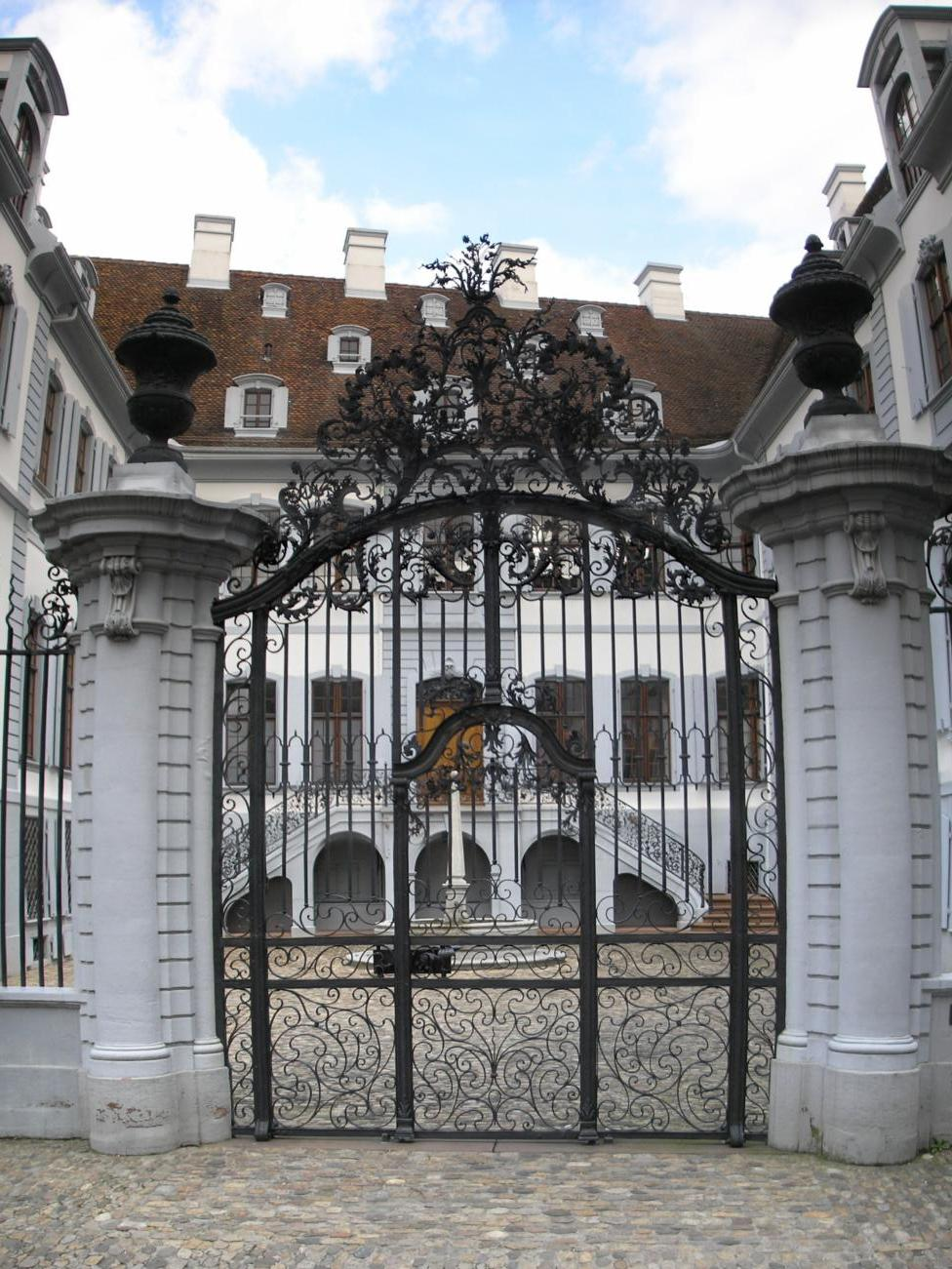
The Blue House

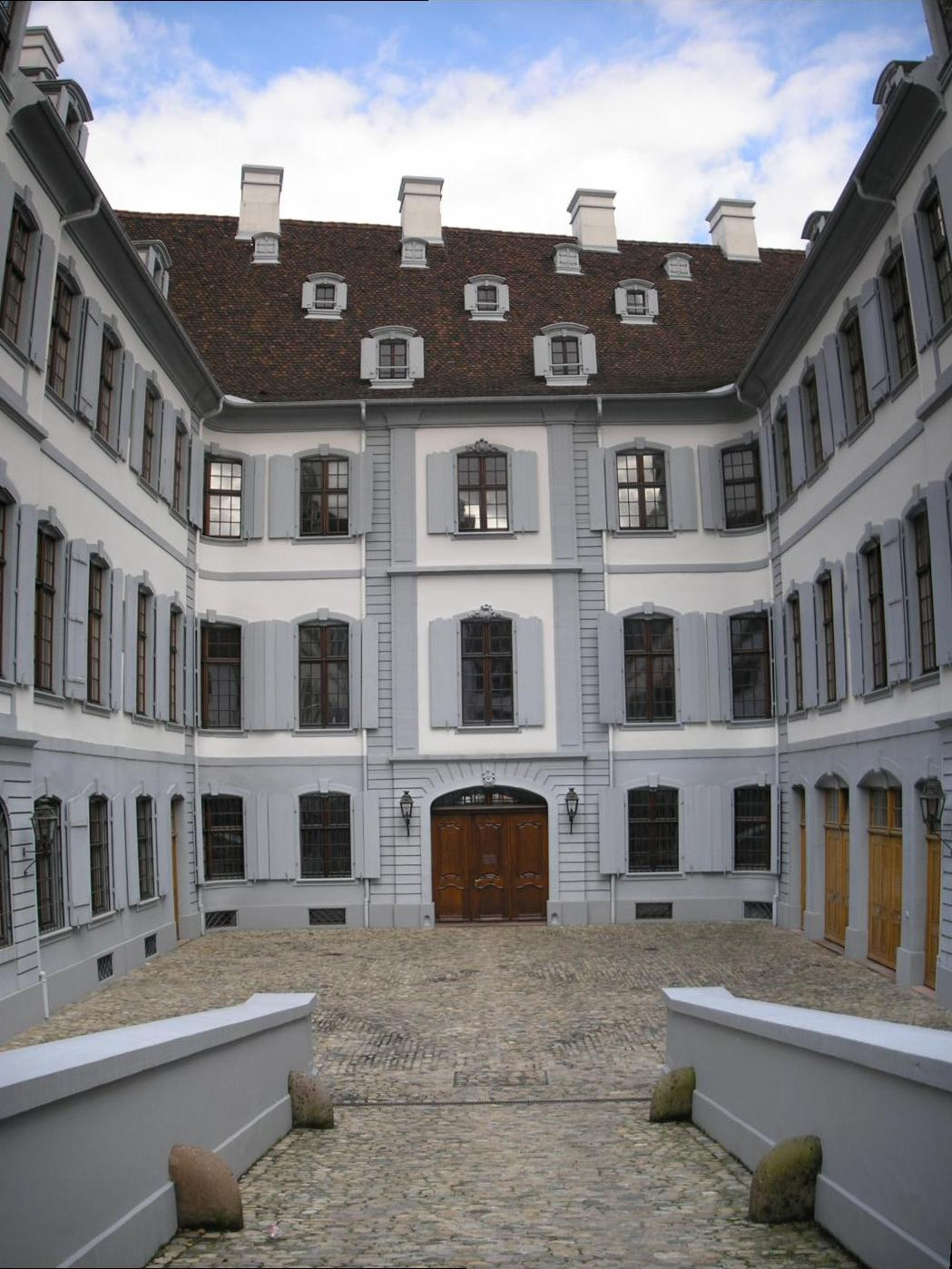
The White House

The Blue and The White House (Blaues und Weisses Haus) are two town mansions in the city of Basel.

The semi-detached baroque mansions on the Rheinsprung 16 and 18 in Basel, also known as “The Reichensteinerhof” and “The Wendelstörferhof”, were built by the architect Samuel Werenfels for the brothers Lukas and Jakob Sarasin between 1763 and 1775. (Note: Sources disagree on the dates: the HDS biographies of Lukas and Jakob Sarasin say each brother built his house in 1762–1769.) “The Blue House” belonged to Lukas (1730 – 1802) and “The White House” to his younger brother Jakob (1742 – 1802). The two patricians had a manufactory for silk products. Descendants of them were the founders of the Bank Sarasin & Cie. in Basel.

The still mainly original interiors of the mansions were executed by highly skilled craftsmen. The stucco ceilings were made by Johann Martin Frohweis and the faience stoves were delivered by the Frisching Faience Manufactory. The numerous sopraporte were painted by German artists.

The two mansions were bought by the canton and the city of Basel in 1942 and in 1968. Nowadays, they are the seat of the Department for Economy, Social Welfare and Environment.

== References and Literature ==
- Dorothee Huber, Architekturführer Basel, 2nd edition 1996, Architecture Museum Basel, ISBN 3-905065-22-3, pages 74 to 75
- Emil Major, Bauten und Bilder aus Basels Kulturgeschichte, 1986, Verlag Peter Heman Basel, ISBN 978-3-85702-010-0, pages 136 and 139
- Das Bürgerhaus in der Schweiz, Band XXIII - Kanton Basel-Stadt, 3rd part and Kanton Basel-Land, 1931, Orell Füssli Verlag, pages 24 to 26
