= Gédéon Sarasin =

Merchant from Lorraine (1573–1636)

- Born: 19 June 1573; Courcelles, near Metz
- Died: 16 December 1636 (aged 63); Basel, Old Swiss Confederacy
- Occupation: Merchant
- Spouses: Marguerite Denais (m. 1599) Esther Lernou (m. 1619)
- Parents: Regnault Sarasin (father); Mayon Cachedenier (mother)

Gédéon Sarasin (19 June 1573 – 16 December 1636) was a merchant from Lorraine who ran his family's trading house in Metz, Sainte-Marie-aux-Mines and Colmar before settling in Basel in 1628. He is the progenitor (Stammvater) of the widely branched Basel Sarasin family, which still exists today.

== Biography ==
Gédéon Sarasin was born on 19 June 1573 in Courcelles, near Metz, the son of Regnault Sarasin, a cloth merchant and religious refugee in Metz, and Mayon Cachedenier. He came from a Calvinist family. In 1599 he married Marguerite Denais, and in 1619 he married Esther Lernou.

In Metz Sarasin continued his father's trading house, which he moved in 1598 to Markirch (Sainte-Marie-aux-Mines) in Alsace and in 1602 to Colmar. When Colmar came under Catholic rule again in 1628, he left the city and moved to Basel, where, together with his son Regnault, he acquired citizenship and was admitted to the Saffron guild (Safranzunft). Until 1629 he was a partner in the firm Wibert und Sarasin; after that he ran his own firm with his sons. He died in Basel on 16 December 1636.

== Bibliography ==
- Geschichte der Familie Sarasin in Basel, 1, 1914, 15–17
