= Hôtel DuPeyrou =

Coordinates: 46°59′38″N 6°56′01″E

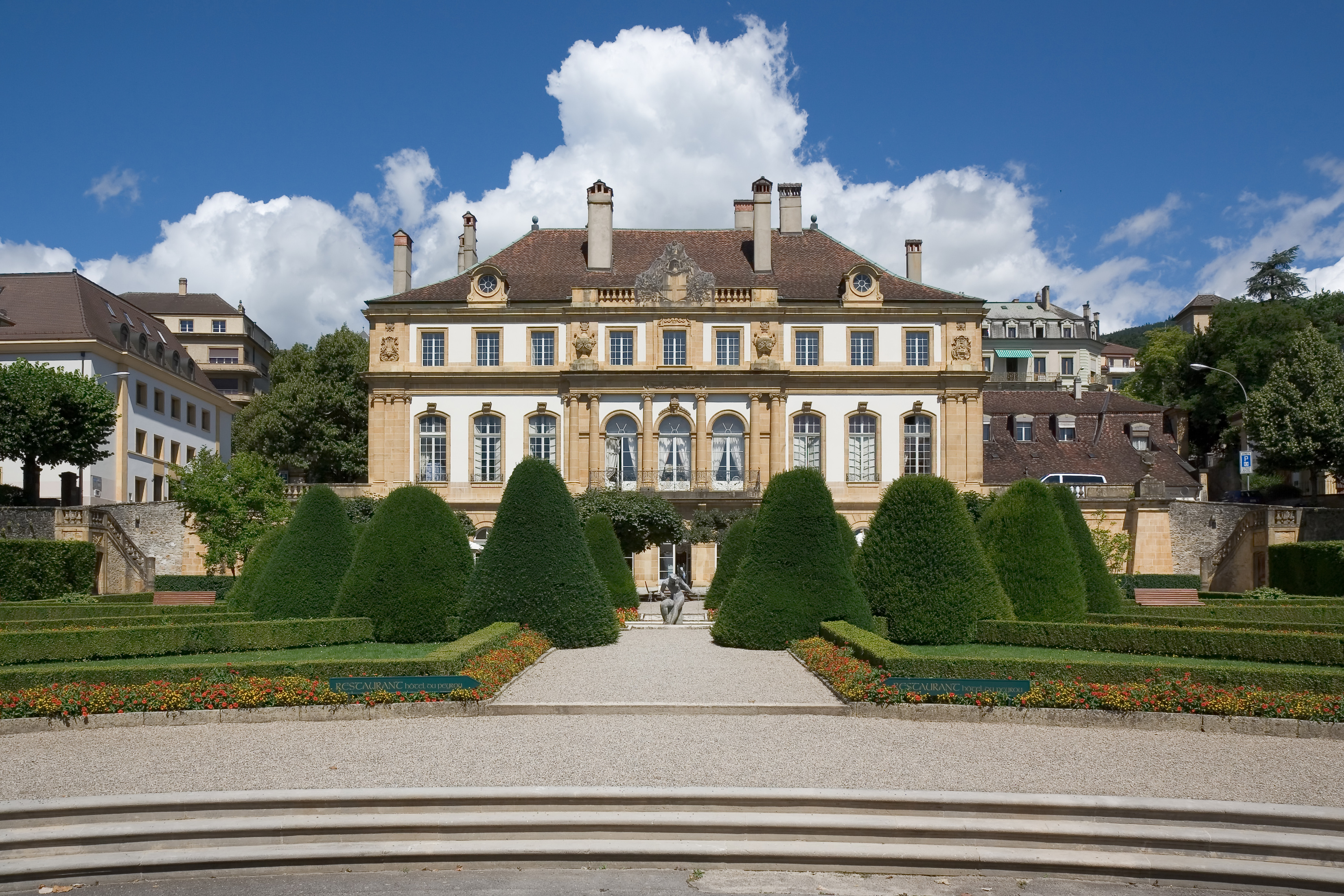
Garden side of the Hôtel DuPeyrou

The Hôtel DuPeyrou (DuPeyrou Palace) is a mansion in the city of Neuchâtel, Switzerland.

== History ==
The relatively large Swiss mansion was built between 1765 and 1771 for the slave trader Pierre-Alexandre DuPeyrou (1729–1794) by the Bernese architect Erasme Ritter (1726–1805). The still mainly original interior of the mansion was executed by highly skilled craftsmen. The faience stoves were delivered by the Frisching Faience Manufactory from Bern.

DuPeyrou was immensely rich. His fortune derived from his two slave plantations in Suriname where he was born and where his father was in a high position within the Court of Justice. DuPeyrou was a close friend of Jean-Jacques Rousseau. It was DuPeyrou who paid the costs for the first publishing of the complete works of Jean-Jacques Rousseau in 1788 in Geneva.

DuPeyrou and his wife, Henriette Dorothée de Pury (1750–1818), had no children. In 1799, the mansion was sold to Frédéric de Pourtalès. Afterwards the mansion changed hands several times. In 1858, the city of Neuchâtel bought the mansion and restored it to its former glory. Today the Hôtel DuPeyrou contains a restaurant and it is also used for ceremonial events by the city.

== Literature and external links ==
- Charly Guyot, Un ami et défenseur de Rousseau: Pierre-Alexandre Du Peyrou, Neuchâtel, Ides et Calendes, 1958
- Anne-Laure Juillerat; Claire Piguet; Jean-Pierre Jelmini (2011). DuPeyrou : un homme et son hôtel (in French). Pontarlier-Fleurier: Éditions du Belvédère. ISBN 9782884192187.
- Walter A. Staehelin: Keramische Forschungen aus bernischen Archiven. In: Keramikfreunde der Schweiz: Mitteilungsblatt. Nr. 81 (1970), S. 3–34.
- Robert L. Wyss: Kachelöfen, in: Bern und die bildenden Künste, in: Illustrierte Berner Enzyklopädie, Bd. IV. Kunst und Kultur im Kanton Bern, Bern 1987, S. 107–109.
- Website Hôtel DuPeyrou
- Luxury Dream Villas
