= Felix Sarasin the Elder =

Swiss merchant and politician (1771–1839)

Felix Sarasin
- Born: 7 March 1771; Basel, Old Swiss Confederacy
- Died: 19 December 1839 (aged 68); Basel, Switzerland
- Occupations: Merchant; politician; judge
- Spouse: Christiana Carolina Burckhardt (m. 1796)
- Children: Felix Sarasin the Younger
- Father: Jakob Sarasin
- Relatives: Lukas Sarasin (uncle)

Felix Sarasin the Elder (7 March 1771 – 19 December 1839) was a Swiss merchant and politician from Basel, a member of the Sarasin family. He took over his father's trading house, was a member of the Small Council of Basel from 1821 to 1833 and an envoy to the Federal Diet in 1824. In 1804 he co-founded the general poor-relief institution (Allgemeine Armenanstalt), and in 1810 the savings bank (Ersparnisskasse).

== Biography ==
Felix Sarasin was born on 7 March 1771 in Basel, the son of Jakob Sarasin and the nephew of Lukas Sarasin. In 1796 he married Christiana Carolina Burckhardt, daughter of Leonhardt Burckhardt, a merchant. His son was Felix Sarasin the Younger.

Sarasin received a commercial training, with stays in Genoa and Livorno, and later took over his father's trading house. He joined the firm Sarasin und Heusler, which traded in overseas goods, indigo and cotton, and he too shifted the emphasis to ribbon manufacturing.

In 1814 Sarasin became a member of the Grand Council of Basel. From 1821 to 1833 he was a member of the Small Council, responsible for churches and schools, and from 1827 a member of the state council (Staatsrat) and the education council (Erziehungsrat). In 1824 he was an envoy to the Federal Diet (Tagsatzung). He was a judge at the civil court from 1801 to 1814 and at the court of appeal from 1814 to 1821.

For many years Sarasin was involved in the Society for the Good and the Common Benefit (Gesellschaft für das Gute und Gemeinnützige), among other things as its president in the jubilee year 1827. In 1804 he co-founded the general poor-relief institution (Allgemeine Armenanstalt), and in 1810 the savings bank (Ersparnisskasse). He died in Basel on 19 December 1839.

== Bibliography ==
- Geschichte der Familie Sarasin in Basel, 2, 1914, 1–21

=== Archives ===
- Basel-Stadt State Archives (Staatsarchiv Basel-Stadt), Basel: personal papers (Nachlass)
