= Lukas Sarasin =

Swiss silk-ribbon manufacturer (1730–1802)

- Born: 9 December 1730; Basel, Old Swiss Confederacy
- Died: 27 June 1802 (aged 71); Basel, Helvetic Republic
- Occupation: Silk-ribbon manufacturer
- Spouse: Anna Margaretha Werthemann (m. 1754)
- Parents: Hans Franz Sarasin (father); Susanna Katharina Fattet (mother)
- Relatives: Jakob Sarasin (brother); Felix Sarasin the Elder (nephew)

Lukas Sarasin (9 December 1730 – 27 June 1802) was a Swiss silk-ribbon manufacturer from Basel, a member of the Sarasin family. From 1754 he ran the family's silk-ribbon factory together with his brother Jakob Sarasin. In 1762–1769 he built the Blue House (Blaues Haus, also Reichensteinerhof) on the Rheinsprung in Basel. He held house concerts and assembled a collection of instruments and an extensive music library. From 1775 to 1798 he was director of the merchants' corporation (Kaufmannschaft).

== Biography ==
Lukas Sarasin was born on 9 December 1730 in Basel, the son of Hans Franz Sarasin, a silk-ribbon manufacturer, and Susanna Katharina Fattet. His brother was Jakob Sarasin. In 1754 he married Anna Margaretha Werthemann, daughter of Peter Werthemann, a stocking manufacturer, banker and member of the council (Ratsherr). His nephew was Felix Sarasin the Elder.

From 1745 to 1748 Sarasin served an apprenticeship as a dyer in Zurich. In 1751 he became a partner in his father's silk-ribbon factory, (Note: Sources disagree: the HDS biography of Lukas Sarasin calls it his father's factory, while the HDS article on the Sarasin family says that Lukas and Jakob Sarasin continued the factory of their grandfather Hans Franz Sarasin (1649–1719).) which from 1754 he ran successfully together with his brother Jakob. In 1762–1769 he built the Blue House (Blaues Haus, also Reichensteinerhof) on the Rheinsprung, an outstanding Baroque building, into which he moved in 1770.

Sarasin held house concerts and built up a collection of instruments and an extensive music library. In politics, he was a member of the Grand Council from 1750, and from 1775 to 1798 he was director of the merchants' corporation (Direktor der Kaufmannschaft). He died in Basel on 27 June 1802.

== Bibliography ==
- Geschichte der Familie Sarasin in Basel, 1, 1914, 75–93

=== Archives ===
- Basel-Stadt State Archives (Staatsarchiv Basel-Stadt), Basel: personal papers (Nachlass)
