= Felix Sarasin the Younger =

Swiss industrialist and mayor (1797–1862)

Felix Sarasin
- Born: 7 October 1797; Basel, Old Swiss Confederacy
- Died: 21 January 1862 (aged 64); Basel, Switzerland
- Occupations: Industrialist; politician
- Spouses: Emma Burckhardt (m. 1822) Rosalie Brunner (m. 1848)
- Father: Felix Sarasin the Elder
- Relatives: Karl Brunner (father-in-law); Karl Brunner (brother-in-law); Hanns Vischer (grandson)

Felix Sarasin the Younger (7 October 1797 – 21 January 1862) was a Swiss industrialist and politician from Basel, a member of the Sarasin family. He expanded the family business by acquiring cotton spinning mills, and from 1847 to 1862 he was mayor (Bürgermeister) of Basel. A conservative, he was regarded as a bridge-builder between conservatives and liberals, and as an envoy to the Federal Diet he tried without success to mediate before the Sonderbund War.

== Biography ==
Felix Sarasin was born on 7 October 1797 in Basel, the son of Felix Sarasin. In 1822 he married Emma Burckhardt, daughter of Hans Georg Burckhardt, a merchant, and in 1848 Rosalie Brunner, daughter of Karl Brunner. He was a brother-in-law of Karl Brunner. His grandson was Hanns Vischer.

Sarasin served an apprenticeship in his father's cotton factory and spent time in France and Great Britain. In 1822 he joined the family business, which he expanded decisively by acquiring cotton spinning mills. From 1823 he ran cotton-yarn spinning mills in Neuewelt on Basel's St. Alban-Teich and in Haagen in the Wiesental, using technological know-how from Mulhouse, the leading industrial center.

In 1833 Sarasin became a member of the Grand Council and in 1840 of the Small Council, where he was involved in education and church matters. From 1847 to 1862 he was mayor (Bürgermeister) of Basel. Sarasin was a conservative, but he was regarded as a bridge-builder between conservatives and liberals. As an envoy to the Federal Diet (Tagsatzung) in 1847 and 1848, he tried without success to mediate in the run-up to the Sonderbund War. Unlike other Basel conservatives, he was loyal to the new federal state.

In 1829 Sarasin was president of the public-benefit society (Gemeinnützige Gesellschaft). In 1835 he co-founded the voluntary academic society (Freiwillige Akademische Gesellschaft), and in 1853 the Swiss Central Railway (Schweizerische Centralbahn). He died in Basel on 21 January 1862.

== Bibliography ==
- Allgemeine Deutsche Biographie, 30, 371
- Geschichte der Familie Sarasin in Basel, 2, 1914, 23–127
- E. His, Basler Staatsmänner des 19. Jahrhunderts, 1930, 135–143

=== Archives ===
- Basel-Stadt State Archives (Staatsarchiv Basel-Stadt), Basel: personal papers (Nachlass)
