= Carl Geigy (philanthropist) =

Swiss philanthropist

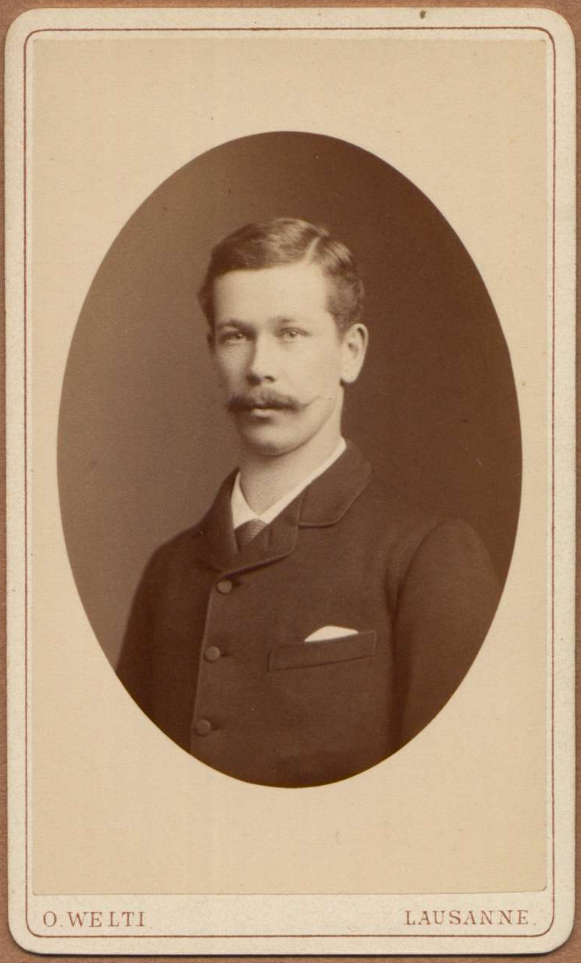
- Born: Carl Geigy; 24 June 1860; Steinen, Grand Duchy of Baden
- Died: 3 January 1943 (aged 82); Münchenstein, Switzerland
- Other name: Karl Geigy
- Occupations: Businessman, philanthropist
- Spouse: Julia Elisabeth Burckhardt (m. 1897)
- Children: 4
- Family: Burckhardt family

Carl Geigy (24 June 1860 – 3 January 1943) was a German-born Swiss businessman and philanthropist.

== Early life and education ==
Geigy was born 24 June 1860 in Steinen, Grand Duchy of Baden, a son of Carl Geigy (1834–1862), a manufacturer, and Margaretha Emilie Geigy (née Burckhardt; 1838–1911). He had a younger brother, Wilhelm Eduard Geigy (1861–1894).

Both his paternal and maternal family originally hailed from Basel, Switzerland, where they were part of the social upper class Daig. His paternal grandfather, Karl Geigy (1798–1861), was one of the founders and president of Swiss Central Railway, an original predecessor to Swiss Federal Railways.

He spent his youth in Basel, where he attended the Gymnasium, and completed a vocational school. He studied to become a mechanical engineer in Lausanne in Romandy and ultimately continued his professional training in a weaving factory in Bradford and in a spinning mill in Oldham, England. There he became acquainted with the issues of the working class.

== Philanthropy ==
Following a journey around the world he returned to Switzerland in 1887. He was co-founder of the engineering association in Basel. From 1904 onwards he withdrew from his professional career.

Following his withdrawal from his occupation, he devoted his time to the social humanitarian and religious tasks. He dedicated himself to the building of the children's hospital in Basel. Carl Geigy became famous as philanthropist and was a father figure in Münchenstein, where he was awarded the honorary citizenship in 1937.

== Personal life ==
In 1897, Geigy married Julie Elisabeth Burckhardt (1872–1949), a daughter of Eduard Burckhardt (1838–1904) and Elisabeth Burckhardt (née Burckhardt; 1850–1920), both members of the Burckhardt family. They had four children;

- Carl Eduard Geigy (1894–1941), never married and without issue
- Julie Elisabeth Geigy (1900–1966), married Pierre His (1896–), had three children.
- Jenny Emily Geigy (1902–1990), married Harry Haegler (1896–), had two children.
- Karl Felix Geigy (1904–1977), married Alice Engi (1912–2003).

Geigy acquired the Bruckgut estate in Münchenstein and commissioned the farm house and stables following inspirations from Norwegian architecture in 1888. He died on 3 January 1943 aged 82.

== Literature ==
- Personal data in: Zur Erinnerung an Carl Geigy-Burckhardt, printed brochure 1943, pages 5 to 11. - Nekrolog in: BN 5.1.1943
