= Werthemann family =

Family of Basel, Switzerland

- Country: Switzerland
- Current region: Basel
- Earlier spellings: Vertemate
- Origin: Plurs (Piuro), Bregaglia
- Founded: 1587 (citizenship of Basel)
- Founder: Achilles Werthemann (1552–1608)
- Estates: Wildenstein Castle (1717–1792); Schwengi estate, Langenbruck (from 1736)

The Werthemann family is a family of the city of Basel that came from Plurs (Piuro) in the Bregaglia valley (Bergell) and was active in the forwarding trade. Its Italian name, Vertemate, was Germanized to Werthemann in the 17th century. Its members were active in the silk-ribbon industry, in trade and as bankers, and from the 17th century several of them sat in the Grand and Small Councils of Basel.

== History ==
Members of the family also lived in Genoa, Nuremberg, Antwerp and Vienna. Achilles Werthemann (1552–1608), the first of the Basel line, left Plurs in 1583. Before 1586 he was working in Basel as a forwarding agent and cloth merchant, and in 1587 he was granted citizenship there. In 1592 he acquired the guild right of the Saffron guild (Zunft zu Safran).

His descendants were active in the silk-ribbon industry, in trade, among other things in silk goods, stockings, spices (Spezereien) and dyes, and as bankers. From the 17th century several members of the family belonged to the Grand Council and the Small Council. In 1717 Peter Werthemann (1671–1758) bought Wildenstein Castle at auction; it passed by inheritance to the Vischer family in 1792. From 1794 to 1811 Hans Franz Werthemann (1763–1816) ran an indienne manufactory in Kleinbasel. The descendants of Peter's brother Achilles (1665–1731) came into possession of the Schwengi estate above Langenbruck in 1736, and they still lived in Basel at the beginning of the 21st century.

== Bibliography ==
- Schweizerisches Geschlechterbuch, 3, 534–537
- H. Joneli, Die Firma Achilles Werthemann's Erben und Johannes De Bary, 1925
- A. K. Meyer-Werthemann, Die Familie Werthemann in Basel, 1973
- H. Werthemann, Die Familienbriefe aus dem Werthemann-Archiv, 3 vols., 1995

=== Archives ===
- Basel-Stadt State Archives (Staatsarchiv Basel-Stadt), Basel
