= Heusler =

Heusler is a German surname. Notable people with the surname include:

- Andreas Heusler (1865–1940), Swiss medievalist
- Friedrich Heusler (1866–1947), German mining engineer and chemist
  - Heusler compound

== See also ==
- Heusler, Indiana
