= Jakob Sarasin =

Swiss silk manufacturer (1742–1802)

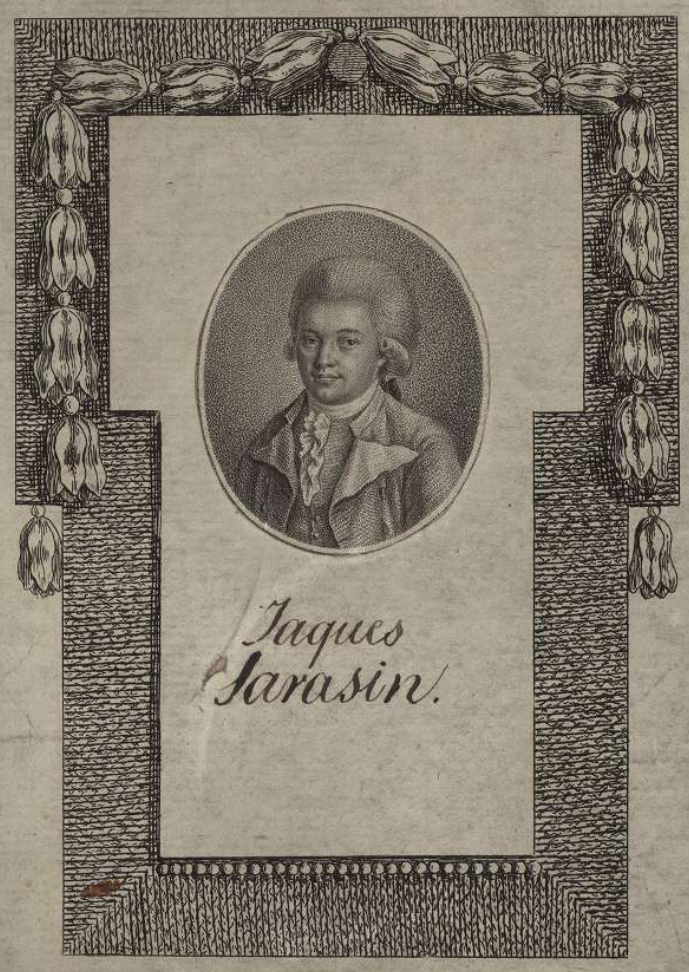
- Born: 26 January 1742; Basel, Old Swiss Confederacy
- Died: 10 September 1802 (aged 60); Basel, Helvetic Republic
- Occupations: Silk-ribbon manufacturer; patron
- Spouse: Gertrud Battier (m. 1770)
- Parents: Hans Franz Sarasin (father); Susanna Katharina Fattet (mother)
- Relatives: Lukas Sarasin (brother)

Jakob Sarasin (26 January 1742 – 10 September 1802) was a Swiss silk-ribbon manufacturer and patron from Basel, a member of the Sarasin family. His house, the White House (Weisses Haus), which he built in 1762–1769, was frequented by numerous writers. With Isaak Iselin he founded the Society for the Promotion of the Good and the Common Benefit. He was a representative of the Enlightenment in Basel, which found expression in his election to the National Assembly in 1798 as the trusted representative of the rural citizens.

== Biography ==
Jakob Sarasin was born on 26 January 1742 in Basel, the son of Hans Franz Sarasin, a silk-ribbon manufacturer, and Susanna Katharina Fattet. His brother was Lukas Sarasin. In 1770 he married Gertrud Battier, daughter of Felix Battier, a merchant.

From 1754 until his death Sarasin was a partner in the firm Hans Franz Sarasin, which his father had founded. Before he became active in the firm, he spent a long time in France, Germany and Italy. In 1762–1769 he built the White House (Weisses Haus, also Wendelstörferhof), into which he moved in 1770.

Besides the business, Sarasin devoted himself above all to his artistic and literary interests. His house was frequented by numerous writers, among them Christoph Kaufmann, Johann Georg Schlosser, Johann Kaspar Lavater, Friedrich Maximilian Klinger and Johann Heinrich Pestalozzi. For a time he was also a patron of Alessandro Cagliostro. With Isaak Iselin he founded the Society for the Promotion of the Good and the Common Benefit (Gesellschaft zur Beförderung des Guten und Gemeinnützigen), which he presided over in 1786.

From 1788 to 1798 Sarasin sat in the Grand Council. He was active in Basel as a patron and above all as a representative of the Enlightenment, which found expression in his election in 1798 as the trusted representative (Vertrauensmann) of the rural citizens in the National Assembly (Nationalversammlung). He died in Basel on 10 September 1802.

== Works ==
- Plimplamplasko, der hohe Geist (heut Genie), 1780 (with Friedrich Maximilian Klinger)

== Bibliography ==
- Allgemeine Deutsche Biographie, 53, 712 f.
- Geschichte der Familie Sarasin in Basel, 1, 1914, 95–283

=== Archives ===
- Basel-Stadt State Archives (Staatsarchiv Basel-Stadt), Basel: personal papers (Nachlass)
