= Samuel Werenfels (architect) =

Swiss architect (1720–1800)

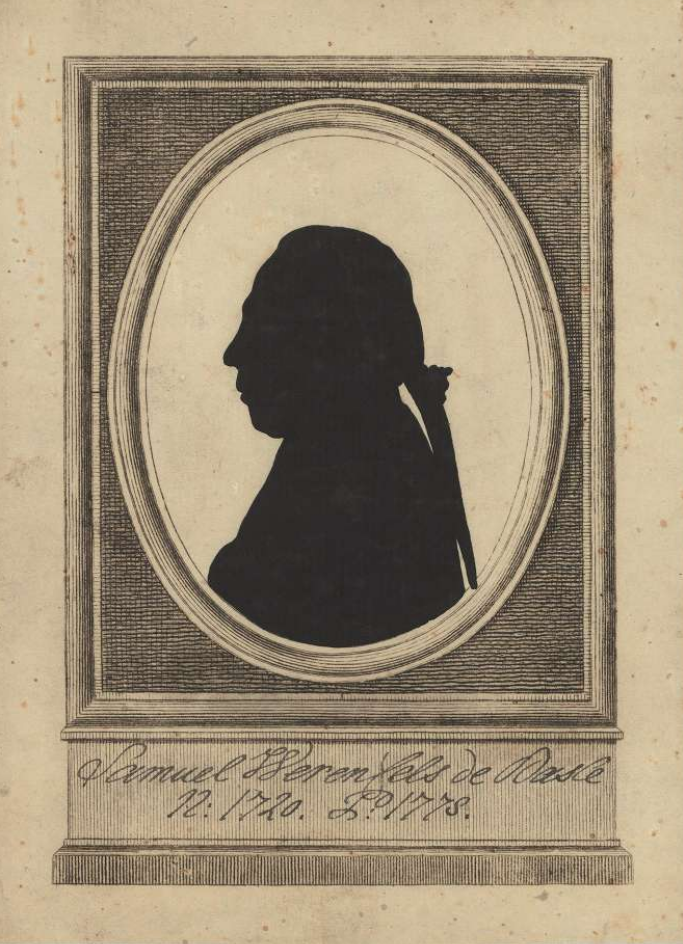
Silhouette of Samuel Werenfels, 1778

Samuel Werenfels (4 August 1720 – 11 September 1800) was a famous Swiss Baroque architect.

== Biography ==
=== Early life ===
Samuel Werenfels, son of Peter Werenfels (businessman and leather glove manufacturer) and Catharina Socin, was born and grew up in Basel. He was grandnephew and godson of the likewise named Swiss theologian Samuel Werenfels. Werenfels was married to Maria Magdalena Strübin.

=== Career ===
As an architect, he was renowned for his Rococo designs, an 18th-century French art and interior design style.

In 1743 he joined the Gesellenbruderschaft der Spinnwetternzunft in Basel and became master craftsman in 1748. In 1788 he became mill inspector and from 1794 master-workman in Basel. He died in Basel, aged 80.

The buildings erected in Basel and the surrounding area according to Werenfels' plans, testify his stylistic continuousness to the contemporary Alsatian architecture. Together with Johann Jacob Fechter (1717–1797) and Ulrich Büchel (1753–1792), Werenfels was one of the most distinguished architects and master builders in Basel during the 18th century.

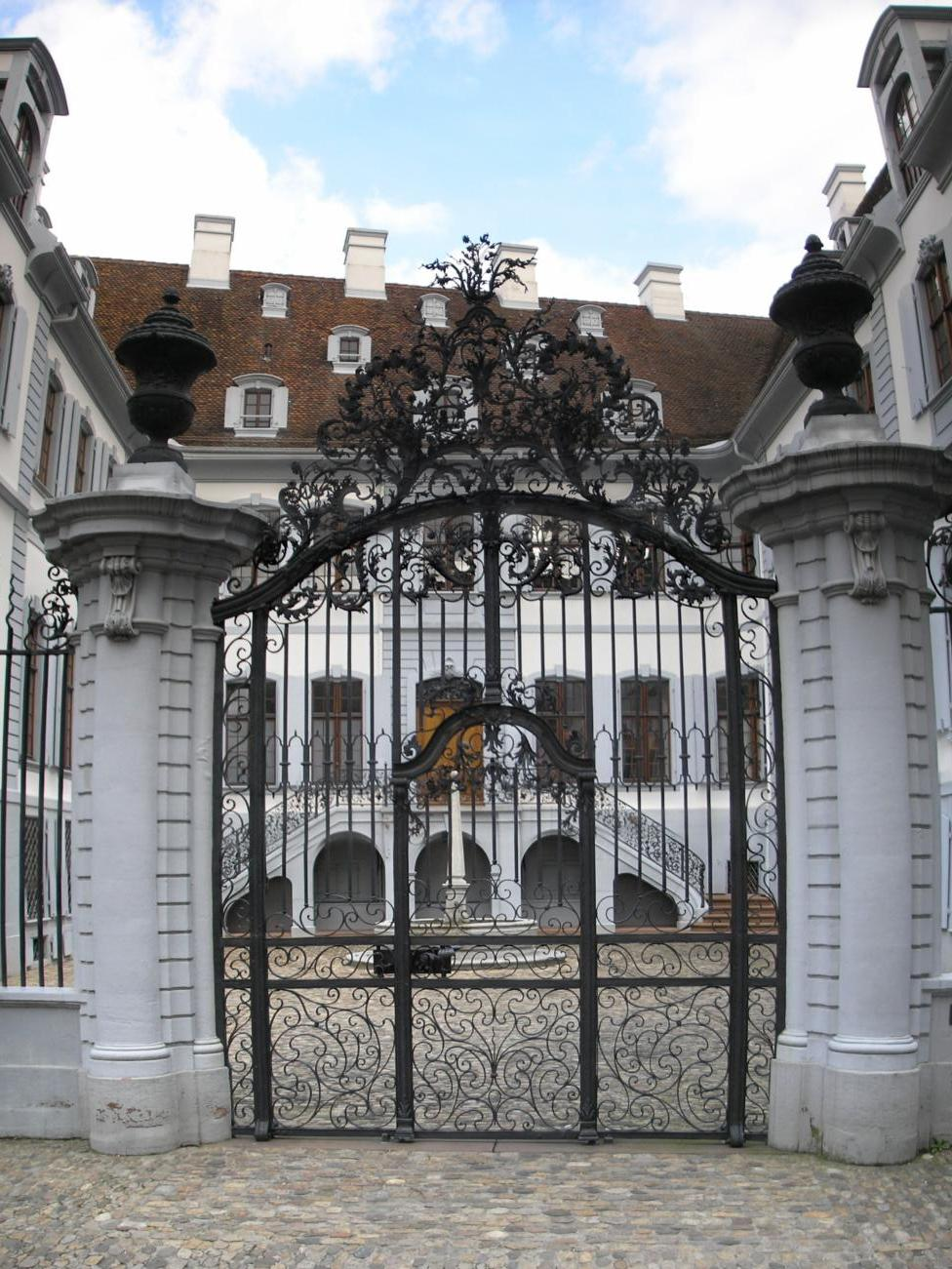
The Blue House

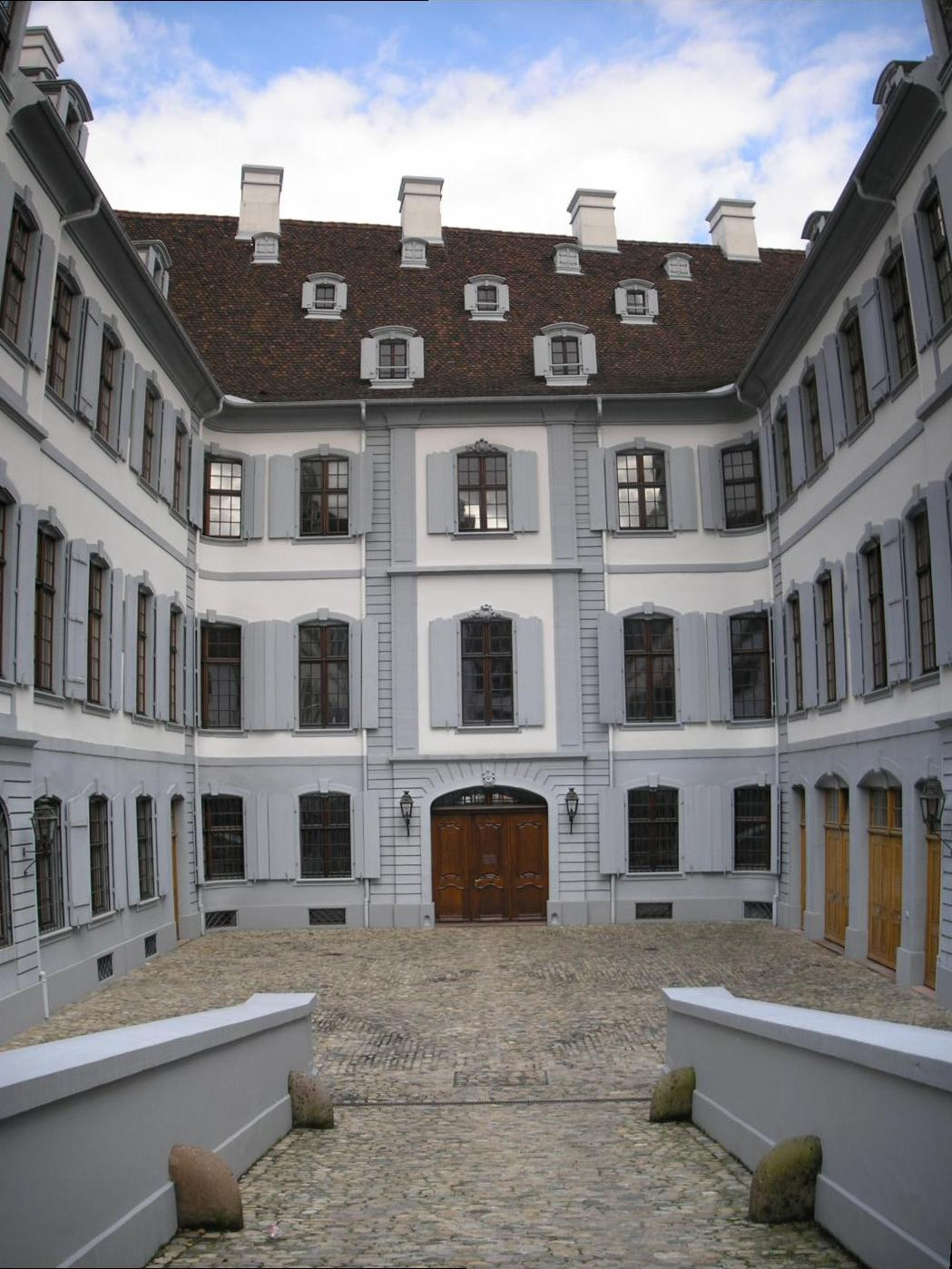
The White House

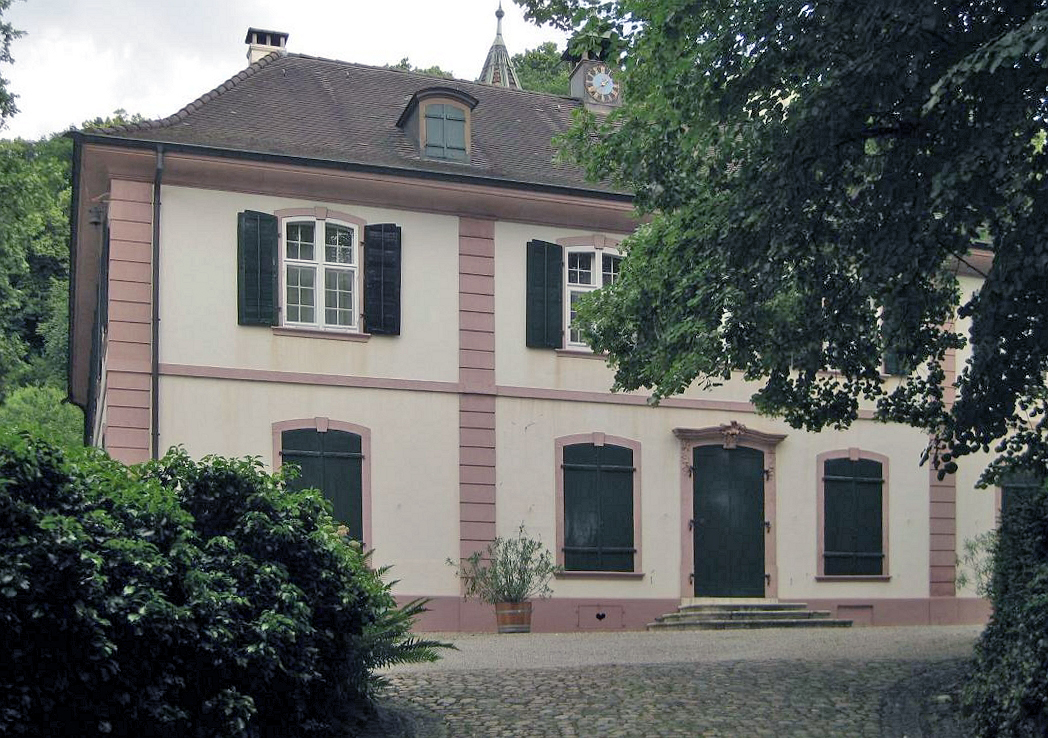
Bruckgut (Münchenstein)

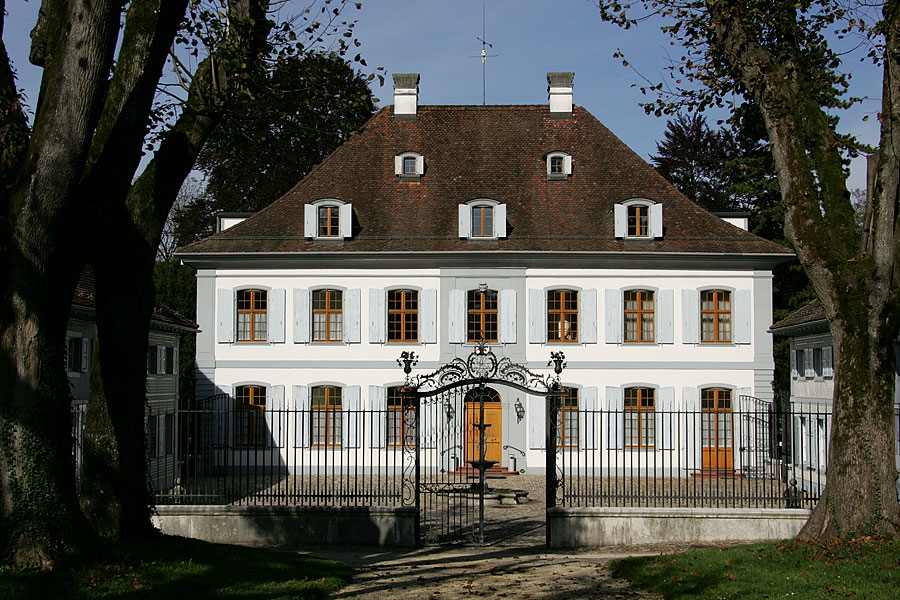
Schloss Ebenrain Sissach

== Buildings ==
=== Basel ===
- Das Blaue und Das Weisse Haus
- Landhaus Ryhiner-Blech (1751)
- Haus Zum Delphin (1760)
- Haus Zum Dolder (1761)
- Posthaus (1773), today this is called the Stadthaus.
- Falkensteinerhof (1779)

=== Surrounding Area ===
- Landhaus Bruckgut in Münchenstein (1758–1761)
- Schloss Ebenrain in Sissach (1776)

=== France ===
- The Parish Church Saint-Rémy (1786) in Hégenheim (Alsace).
