= Carl Brunner von Wattenwyl =

Swiss entomologist (1823–1914)

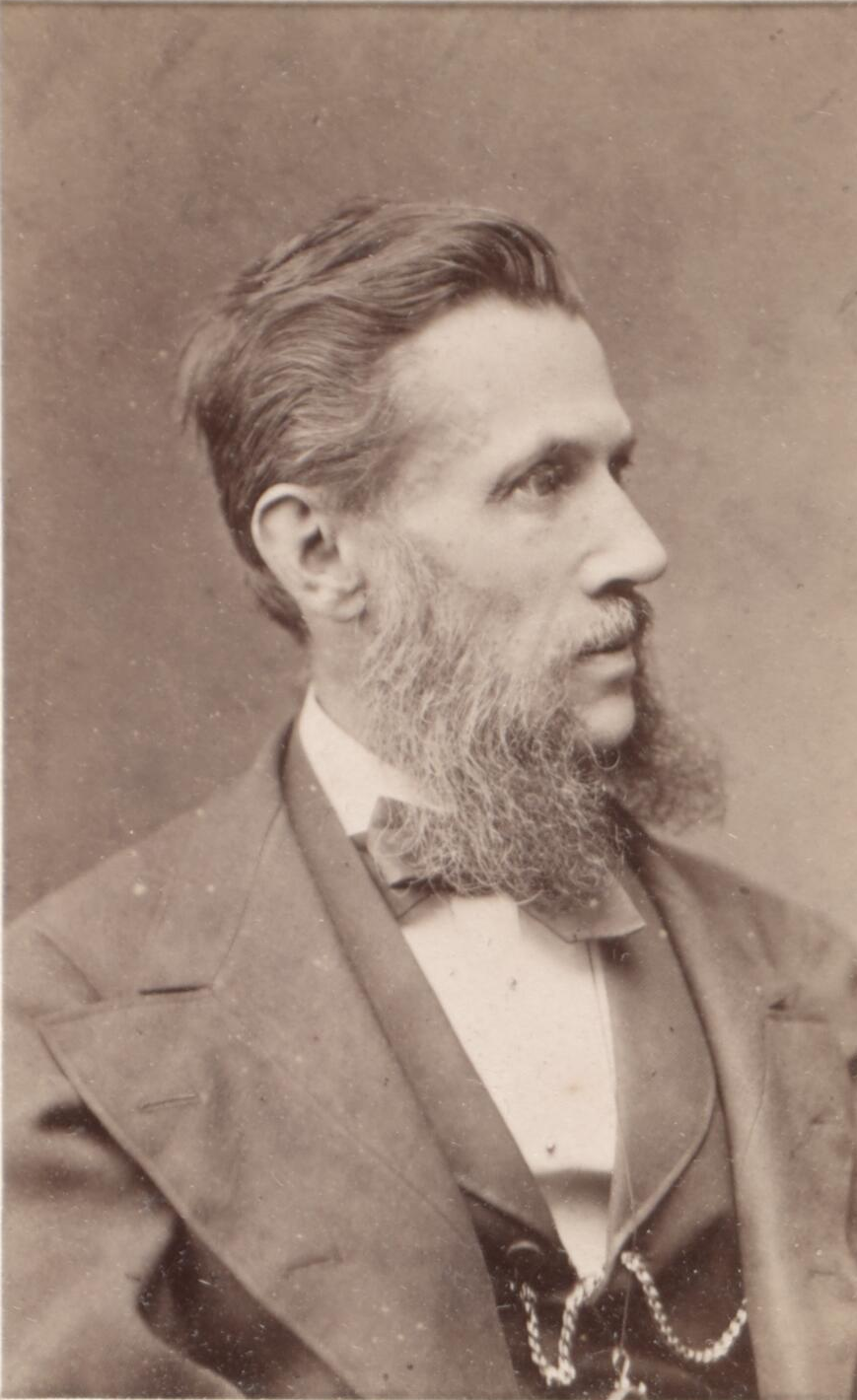
- Brunner von Wattenwyl in 1876
- Born: 13 June 1823; Bern
- Died: 24 August 1914 (aged 91); Kirchdorf

Carl Brunner von Wattenwyl (13 June 1823, Bern – 24 August 1914, Kirchdorf) was a geologist and physicist who worked as the first head of telegraphy administration in Switzerland. He was the first to promote transnational cooperation for telegraphic networks. In his spare time he was an entomologist who specialised in the orthopteroid insects (Orthoptera, Phasmida, Blattaria), and was also a botanist.

Brunner von Wattenwyl was born in Bern, the son of Karl (1796–1867) and Klara Charlotte (1801-1895). His father was a professor of chemistry at the University of Bern. Carl studied natural sciences in Geneva, Bern and Berlin. He received a doctorate in 1846 and served as a professor of physics at Bern from 1850 to 1855. In 1855 he was appointed director of the telegraph administration and was involved in working on telegraphic networks across Europe. He initiated the first international telegraph conference in 1865 in Paris. In 1872 he was posted to the ministry of commerce. In 1880 he was knighted.

He accumulated the world's largest collection of the Orthoptera and described many new taxa of Orthoptera. His collection was housed in 19 large cabinets with 25,000 acquisition numbers in a multi-volume catalogue. He married Emilie Elise Karol (1831–1895) daughter of Karl Anton von Wattenwyl.

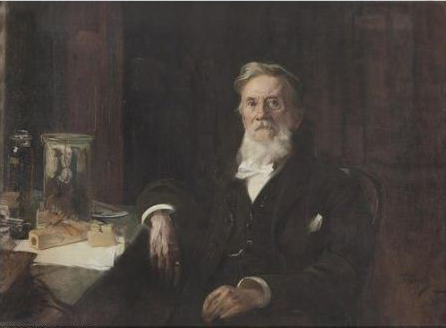
Carl Brunner-von Wattenwyl, by Hans Temple (1906).

His collection is conserved in the Naturhistorisches Museum in Vienna, the Naturhistorisches Museum der Burgergemeinde Bern (Natural History Museum of Bern), Bern, Staatliches Museum für Tierkunde Dresden, Senckenberg Museum in Frankfurt A.M. and Biozentrum Grindel und Zoologisches Museum, Hamburg.

== Works ==
- With Leonardo Fea : Révision du système des orthoptères et description des espèces rapportées) Genova, Tip. del R. Istituto sordo-muti (1893)

== See also ==
Category:Taxa named by Carl Brunner von Wattenwyl
