= Ferdinand Stadler =

Swiss architect (1813-1870)

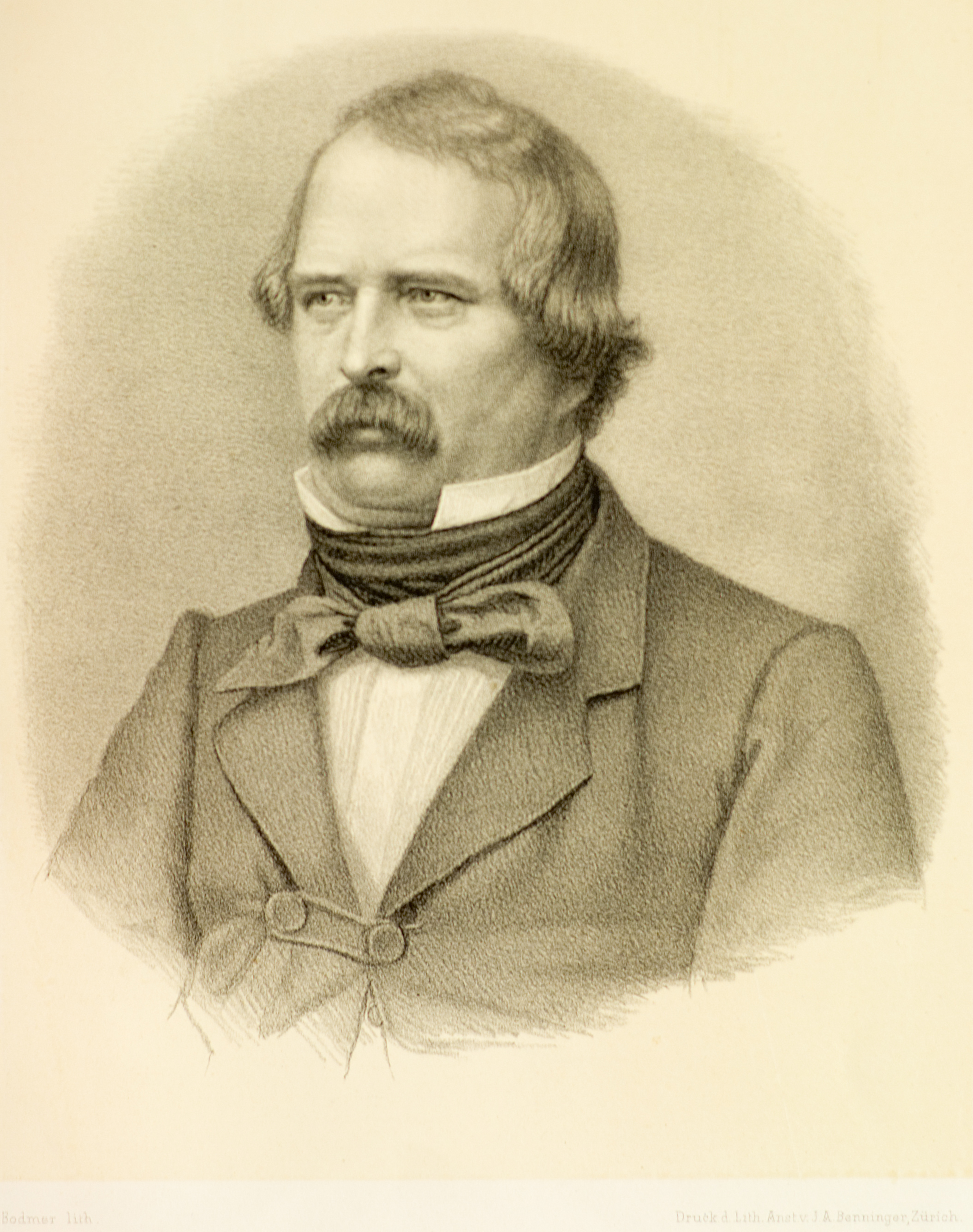
- Ferdinand Stadler, c. 1850
- Born: Caspar Ferdinand Stadler; 23 February 1813; Zurich, Switzerland
- Died: 24 March 1870 (aged 57); Zurich, Switzerland
- Education: Polytechnic in Karlsruhe
- Occupation: Architect
- Spouse: Anna Barbara Waser

Caspar Ferdinand Stadler (23 February 1813 – 24 March 1870) was a Swiss architect and one of leading architects of Zurich of the mid-19th century. He was known especially for church architecture, including the Elisabethenkirche in Basel, the Stadtkirche Glarus and Christ Church in Nazareth. In 1850, he was awarded first prize in the competition to design a Federal Palace in Bern.

== Biography ==
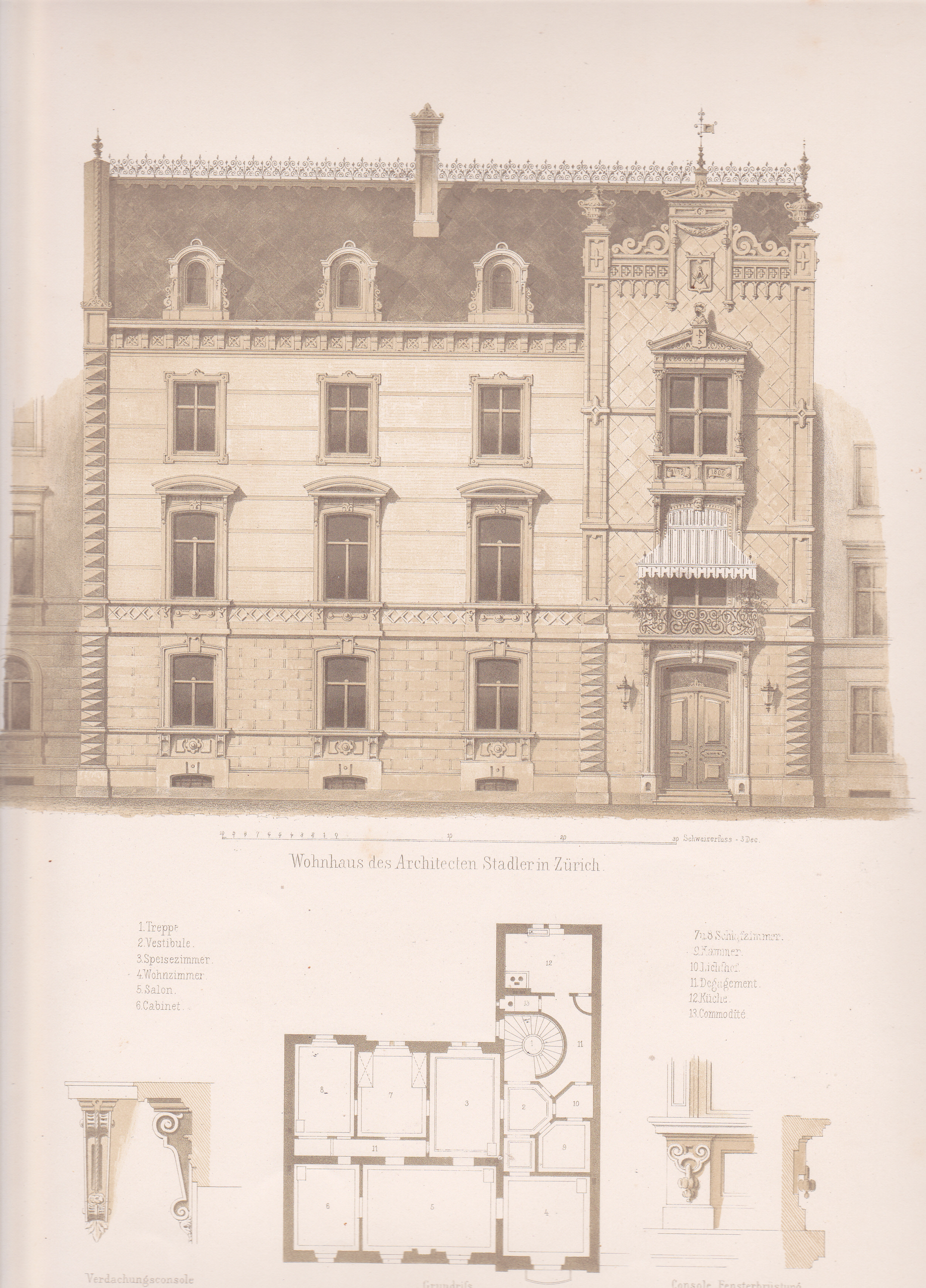
Stadler's house in Enge, Zurich, built before 1848

Ferdinand Stadler was born in Zurich on 23 February 1813. His father, Hans Kaspar Stadler, was a master carpenter and state building inspector. From 1829 to 1832, Stadler trained as a carpenter under his father while also learning architectural drawing. He studied at the Polytechnic in Karlsruhe under Heinrich Hübsch and Friedrich Eisenlohr from 1832 to 1834. He then spent a year in Darmstadt working with Georg Moller.

After his time in Darmstadt, Stadler travelled extensively through central and western Europe before reaching Paris. By the winter of 1835–1836, he was back in Zurich and had joined the construction work on the Münsterbrücke.

Stadler began working independently as an architect in 1840. That year, he received second prize in an international competition for a stock exchange in Frankfurt, helping establish his career as an independent architect. He also married Anna Barbara Waser that year.

Stadler worked as an architect for the Swiss Northern Railway in 1846–1847 and later for the Swiss Northeastern Railway from 1853. From 1855 to 1857, he was an assistant instructor in building construction and building materials at the Polytechnic in Zurich. He died in Zurich on 24 March 1870.

== Architecture ==
By the middle of the 19th century, Stadler was regarded as one of Zurich's leading architects. Classicism formed the main stylistic basis of his work.

Stadler's work on the Augustinerkirche in Zurich began in 1841. The former church had been used as a grain store and was adapted for Catholic worship, becoming the city's first Catholic church after the Reformation. Stadler did not attempt to recreate the church exactly as it had been. Instead, he introduced Gothic features intended to reflect its earlier character, including wooden rib vaults that were not structurally load-bearing. The project established Stadler's reputation in church architecture, and Gothic Revival churches became a major part of his practice.

Built for the manufacturer Forcart-Hoffman in 1844–1845, Villa Rosau in Zurich was intended as a summer residence, with its main façade facing Lake Zurich and the Alps. It is one of the few surviving buildings by Stadler in the city.

In 1850, Stadler's design was awarded first prize in the national competition to design a Federal Palace in Bern. After the designs were revised, however, the project was awarded to the then little-known Bernese architect Jakob Friedrich Studer, who had not entered the competition. Studer was instructed to combine elements of Stadler's proposal with the second-place entry.

Stadler's principal work was the Elisabethenkirche in Basel. In the 1856 national competition for the church, no first prize was awarded among the sixteen submissions. Stadler's design was one of two awarded second prize, and after further revisions he received the commission. The church was built to his plans between 1857 and 1865.

Stadler entered another major architectural competition in 1857, for the new Zurich Polytechnic. The official jury awarded his proposal third prize, while a separate jury of the Swiss Society of Engineers and Architects ranked it first. Gottfried Semper and Johann Caspar Wolf ultimately received the commission.

The Stadtkirche Glarus was built from 1863 to 1866 to Stadler's plans after the previous church was destroyed in the 1861 fire. His later church designs included Christ Church in Nazareth, built from 1868 to 1871.

Stadler used Renaissance Revival forms for a number of secular buildings. His later designs also drew on architectural ideas encountered abroad, including Moorish elements at the Marienburg and French Neo-Baroque forms at Villa Windegg in Zurich.

== Selected works ==
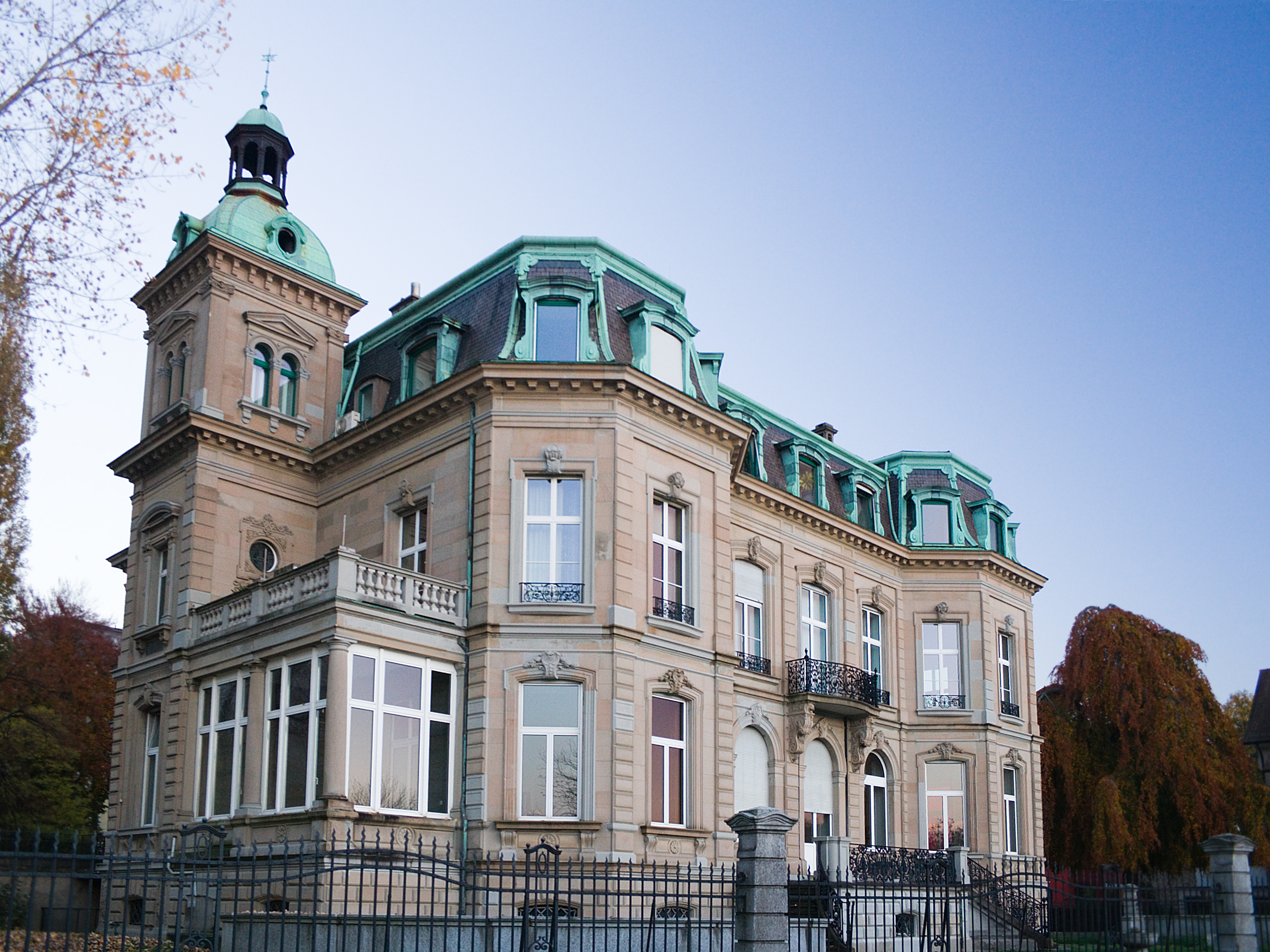
Villa Windegg, Zurich (1867)

- Augustinerkirche, Zurich (from 1841)
- Synagogue, Lengnau (1843–1846)
- Villa Rosau, Zurich (1844–1845)
- Baden railway station, Baden (1846–1847)
- Hohe Promenade cemetery chapel, Zurich (1846)
- Gewerbemuseum, Winterthur (1849–1852)
- Villa Schaer ("Semperhaus"), Stäfa (1850)
- Elisabethenkirche, Basel (1857–1865)
- Stadtkirche Glarus, Glarus (1863–1866)
- Villa Windegg, Zurich (1867)
- Christ Church, Nazareth (1868–1871)

== Gallery ==
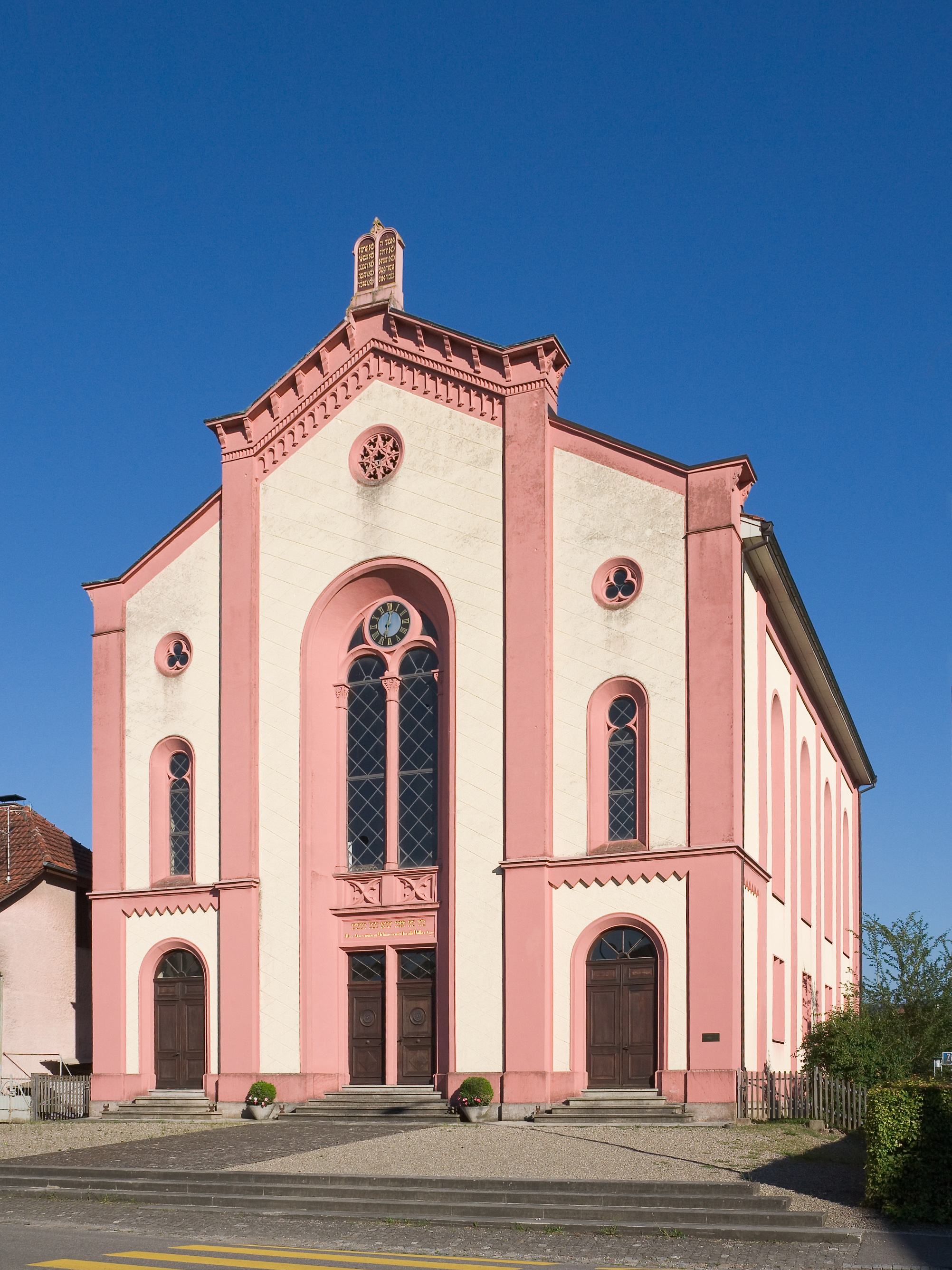
Synagogue, Lengnau (1843–1846)

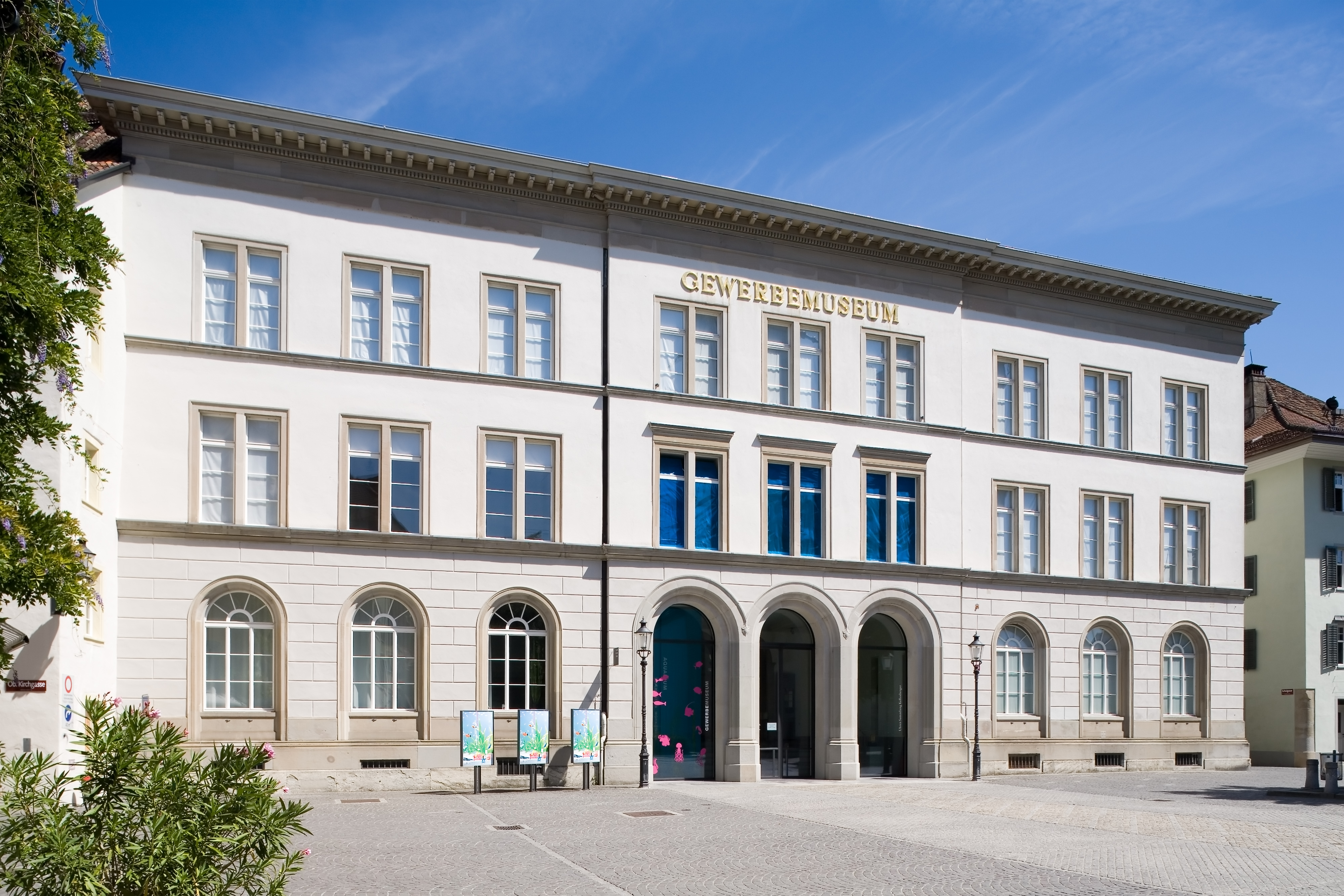
Gewerbemuseum, Winterthur (1849–1852)

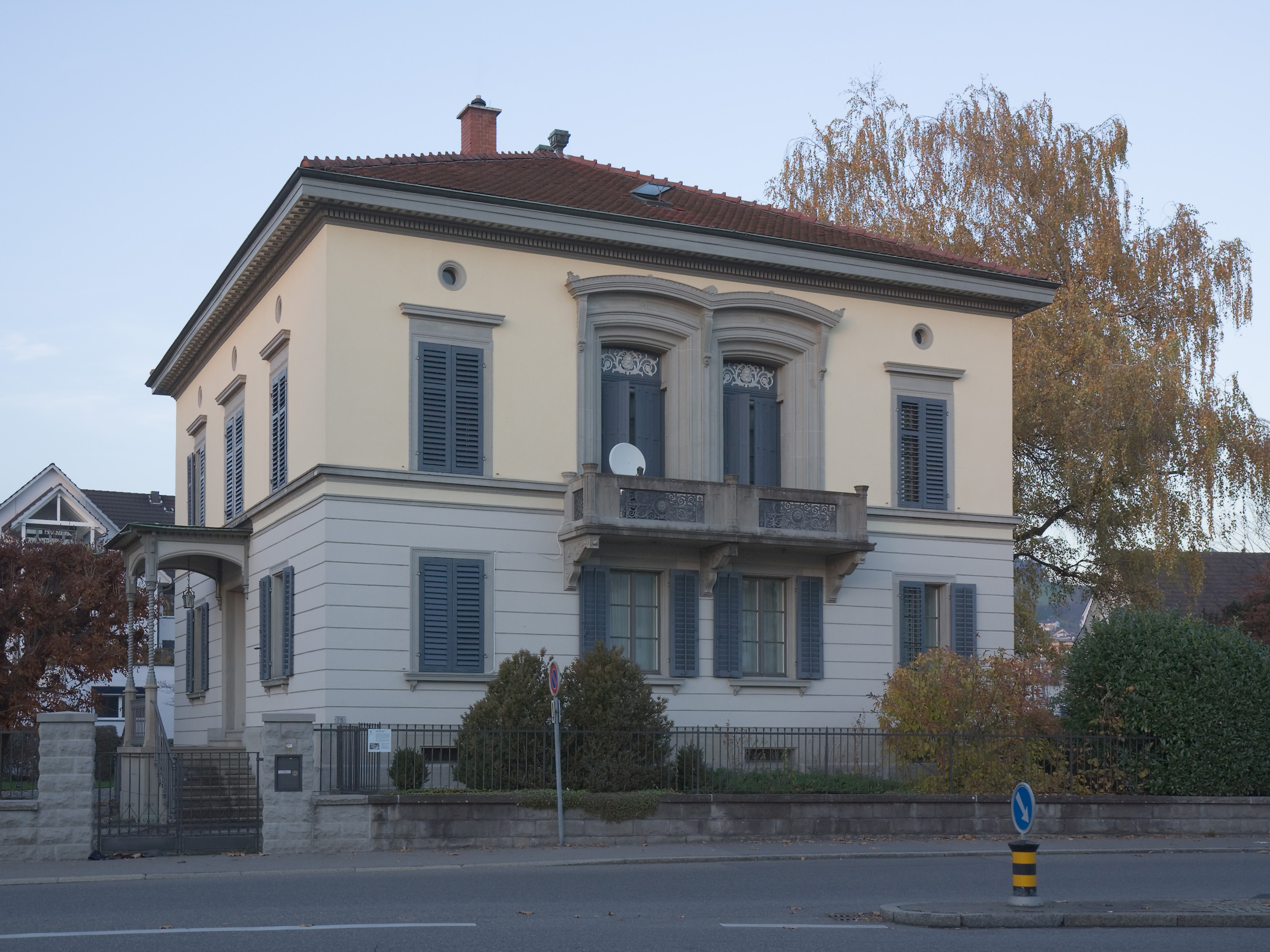
Villa Schaer, Stäfa (1850)

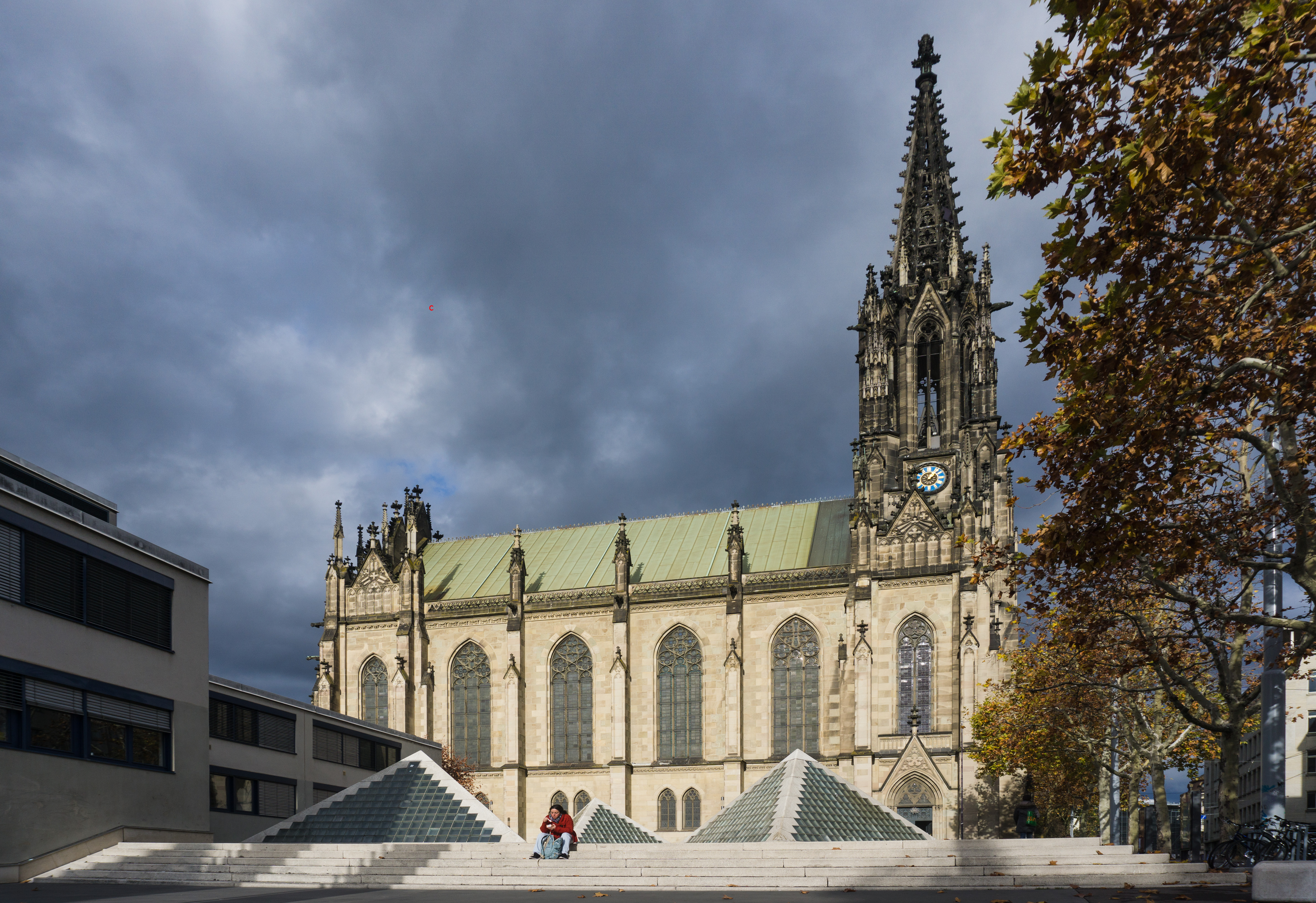
Elisabethenkirche, Basel (1857–1865)

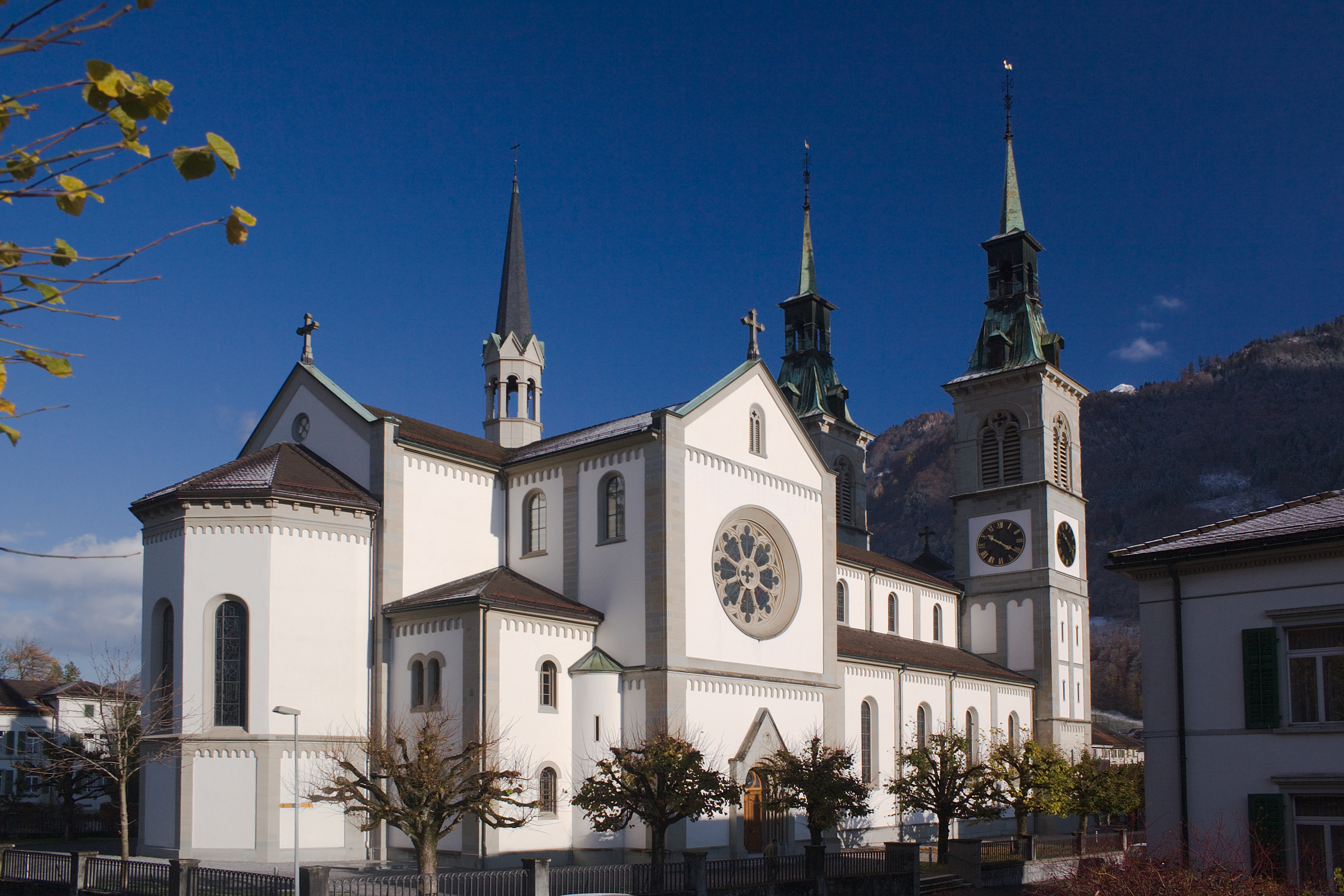
Stadtkirche Glarus (1863–1866)

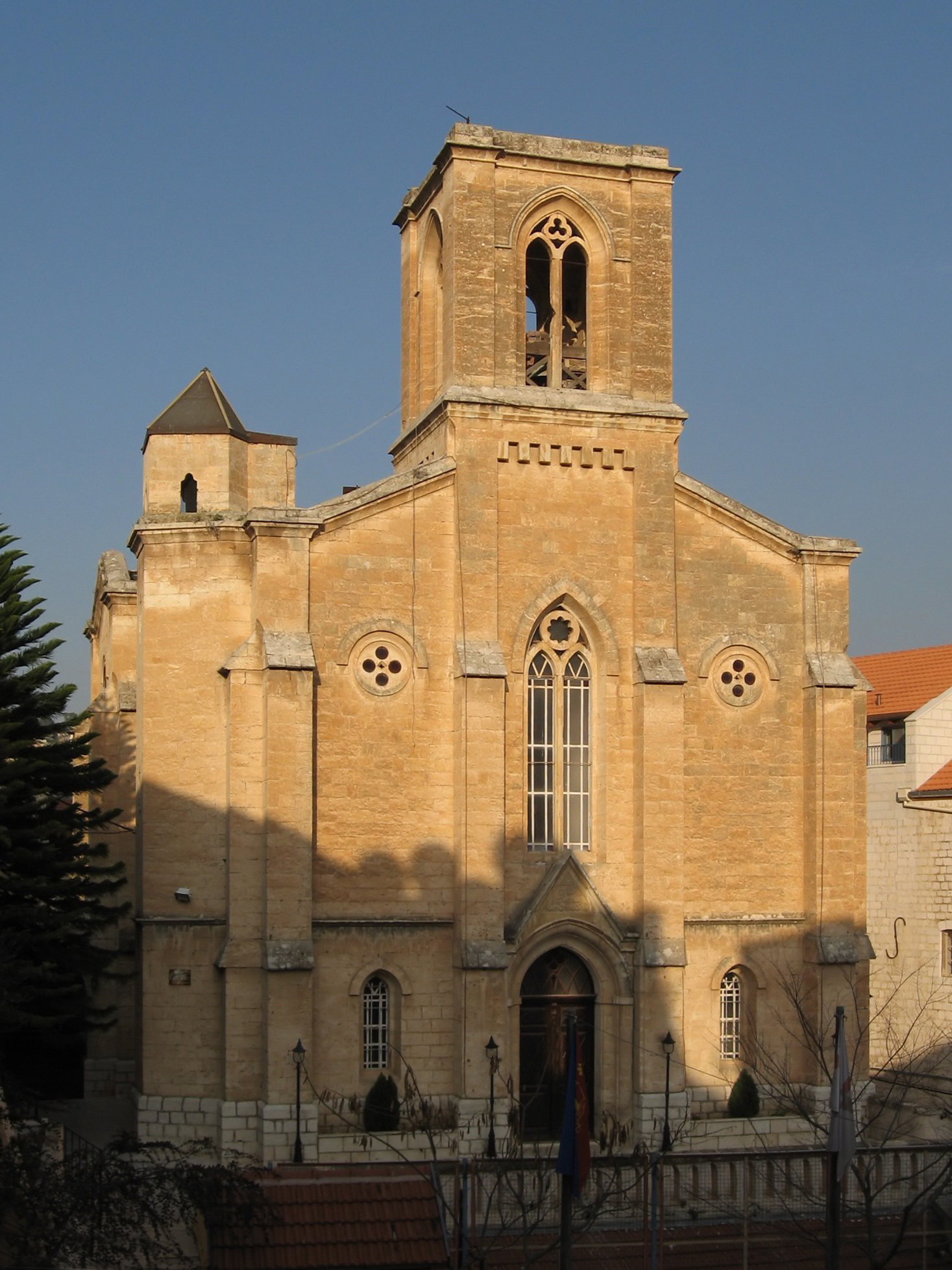
Christ Church, Nazareth (1868–1871)
