= Merian Gardens =

Botanical gardens in Münchenstein, Switzerland

Coordinates: 47°32′19″N 07°36′53″E

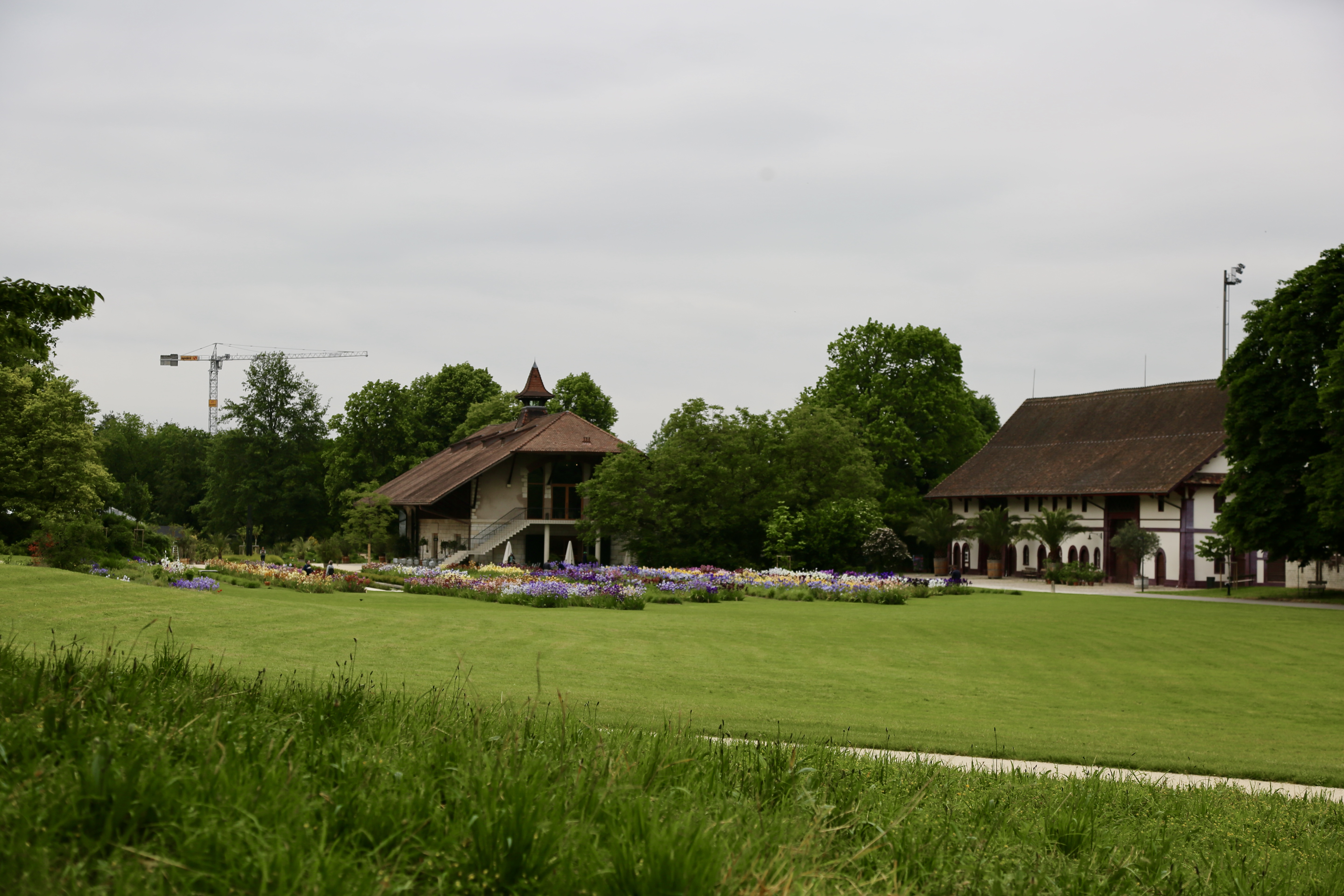
View over the Iris collection

The Merian Gardens are a Botanical Garden in Münchenstein, Switzerland. They are located in the estate that Christoph Merian and his wife Margaret Burckhardt received as their wedding gift in 1824 from Merian's father. The Merians died childless and they left the estate to the Christoph Merian Foundation (CMS).

== Location ==
The Merian Gardens are located in the south of Basel in the Municipality of Münchenstein. The botanical gardens around the Villa Merian are within a larger recreation area for the region. The gardens were known as Merian Park until 2006.

== History ==
=== Origin ===
Christoph Merian had cultivated a garden of species from all over the world for which he built an orangery. But the origin of the modern botanical gardens in Münchenstein was the expansion plans for the University Library of Basel. Therefore, the Christian Merian Foundation (CMS) suggested that a replacement could be created in the Merian estate. In 1969, the CMS signed a contract with a company tasked with the construction, administration and cultivation of the botanical gardens of Basel. The area in which the gardens would be located is roughly thirteen hectares and includes several buildings.

=== 1960s - 1990s ===
In 1969 the botanist Helen Gräfin von Zeppelin donated her vast collection of bearded Irises of about 1500 species to the botanical gardens. The collection is regarded as one of the largest in Europe. In 1972, a cooperation with Milan Blazek, the director of the botanical gardens of Průhonice and an iris-expert, began. In 1978, the collection of Rhododendrons from Robert von Hirsch arrived in the Merian gardens. In 1980, the garden exhibition "Grün 80" was organized to which also Queen Elizabeth II attended. The Queen planted a beech. In 1984, the city gardeners of Basel, tasked with adorning the city with plants, opened a branch in the Merian Gardens. In 1984, the art collector Ernst Beyeler organized an art exhibit in the gardens; several sculptures are still located in the garden. In 1992, a meadow of 2.6 hectares with was declared a national reserve.

=== 2000s - present ===
In 2006, a cousin of Anne Frank requested a new home for a rose named after Anne Frank, of which only a few species remained in Japan. Since then, the rose has been growing in the Merian Gardens. In 2011, a collection of Galanthus (also known as Snowdrops) joined the Merian Gardens. In 2012, the vegetable gardens of the Brüglinger Hof and the botanical gardens of the Merian Park were merged into the Merian Gardens. The foundation ProSpeciaRara established its headquarters just below the Villa Merian in 2012.

== Gallery ==
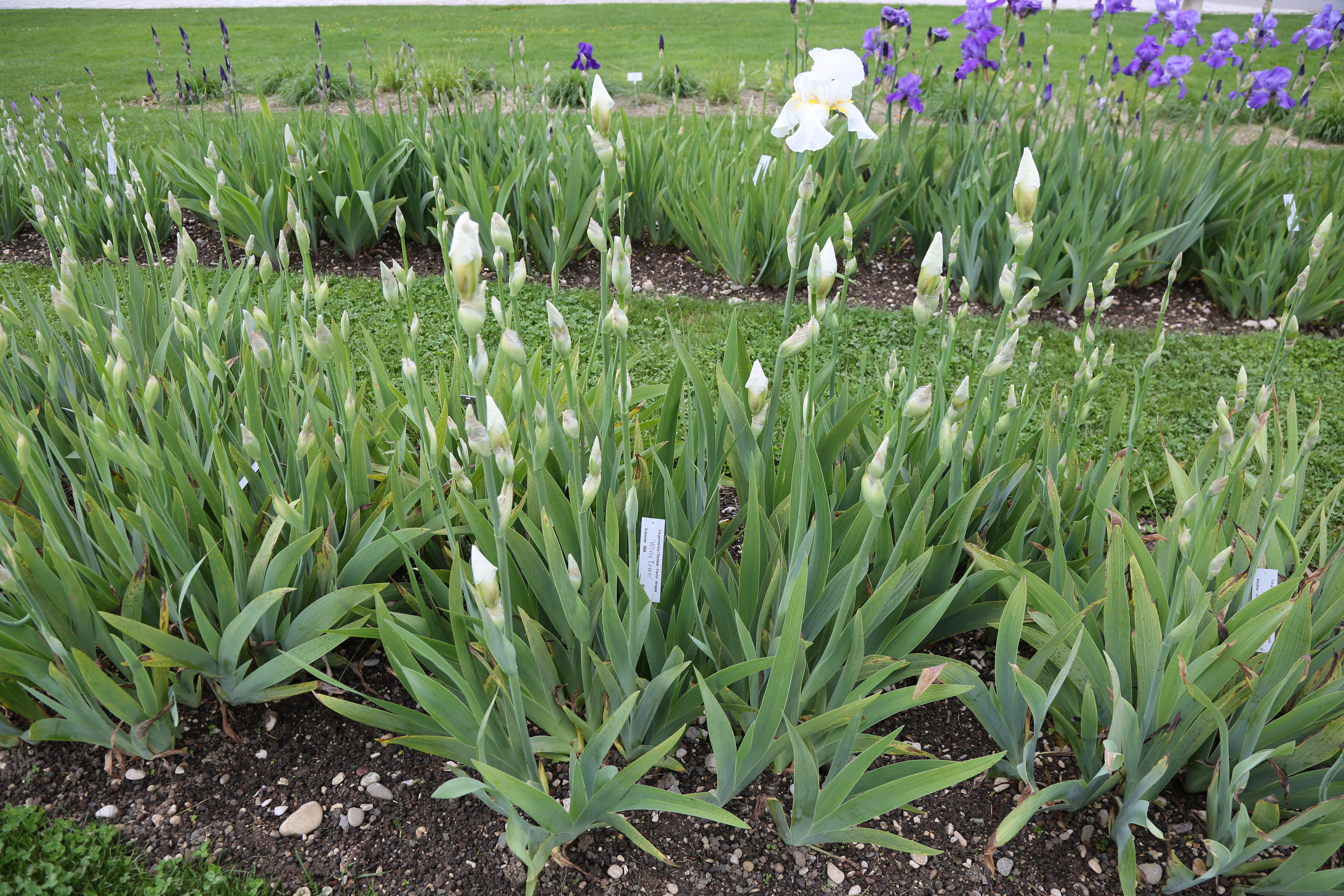
Iris Germanica 'White Tower'

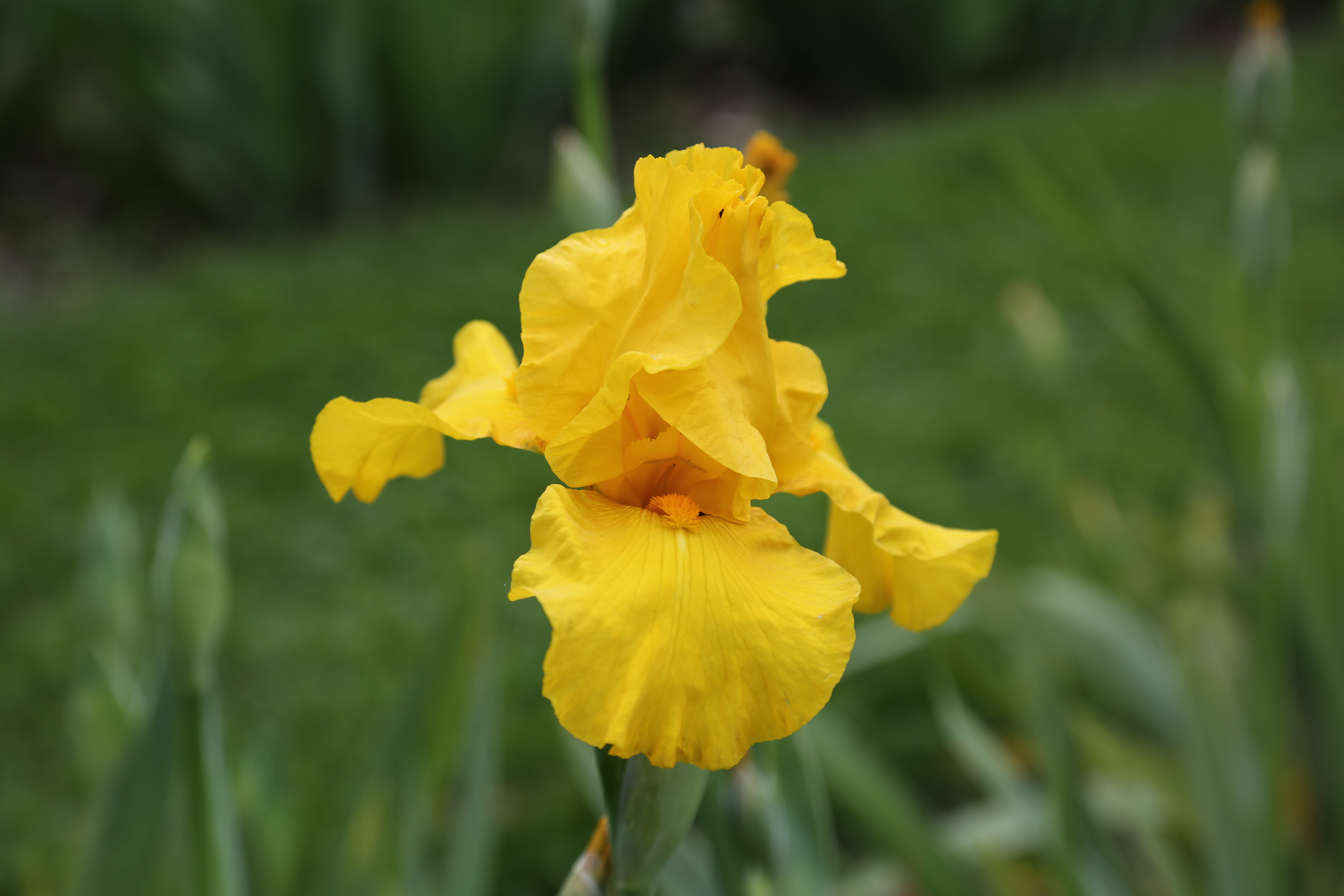
Iris Germanica 'Sunworshipper'

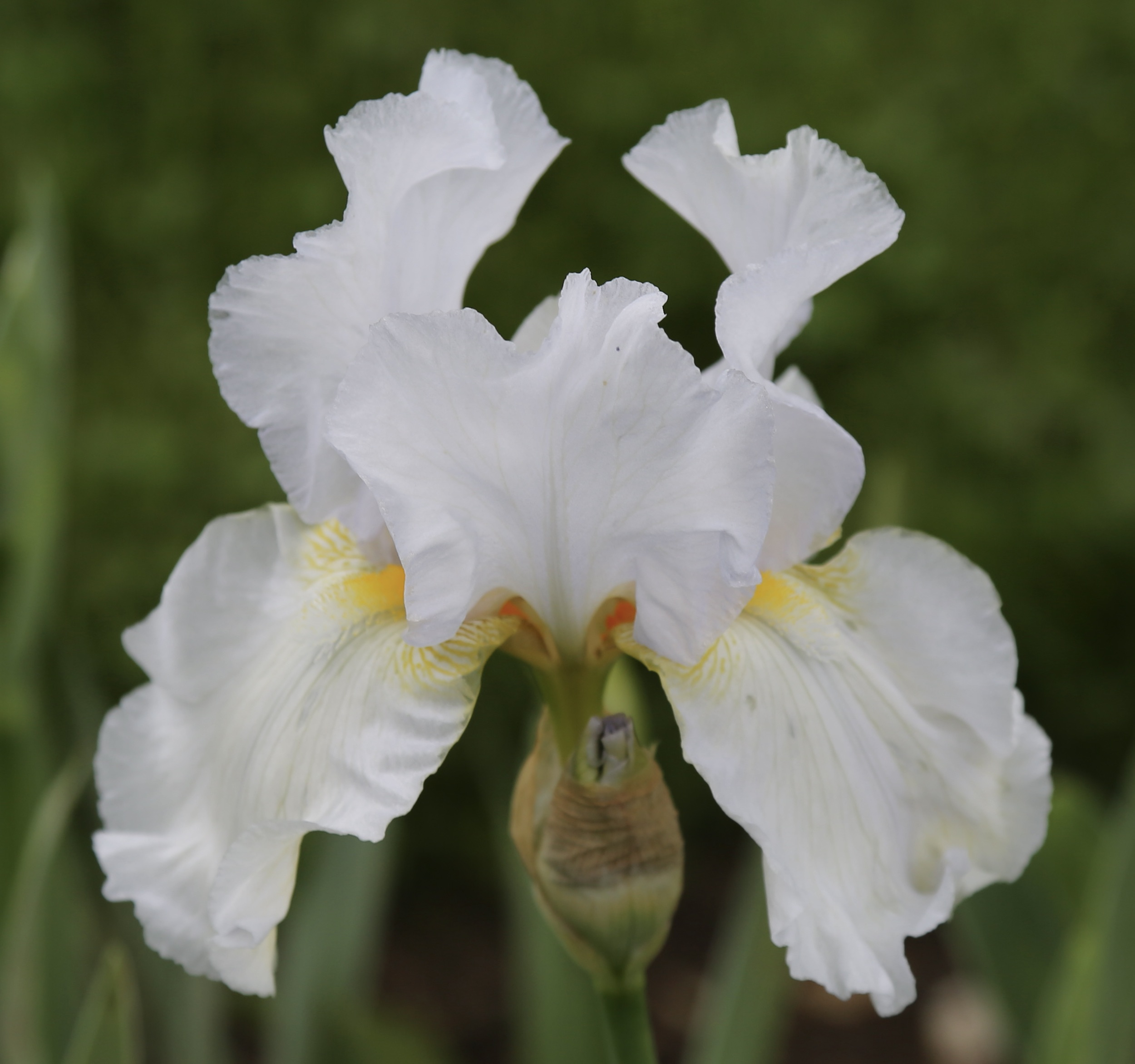
Iris Germanica 'Brother Carl'

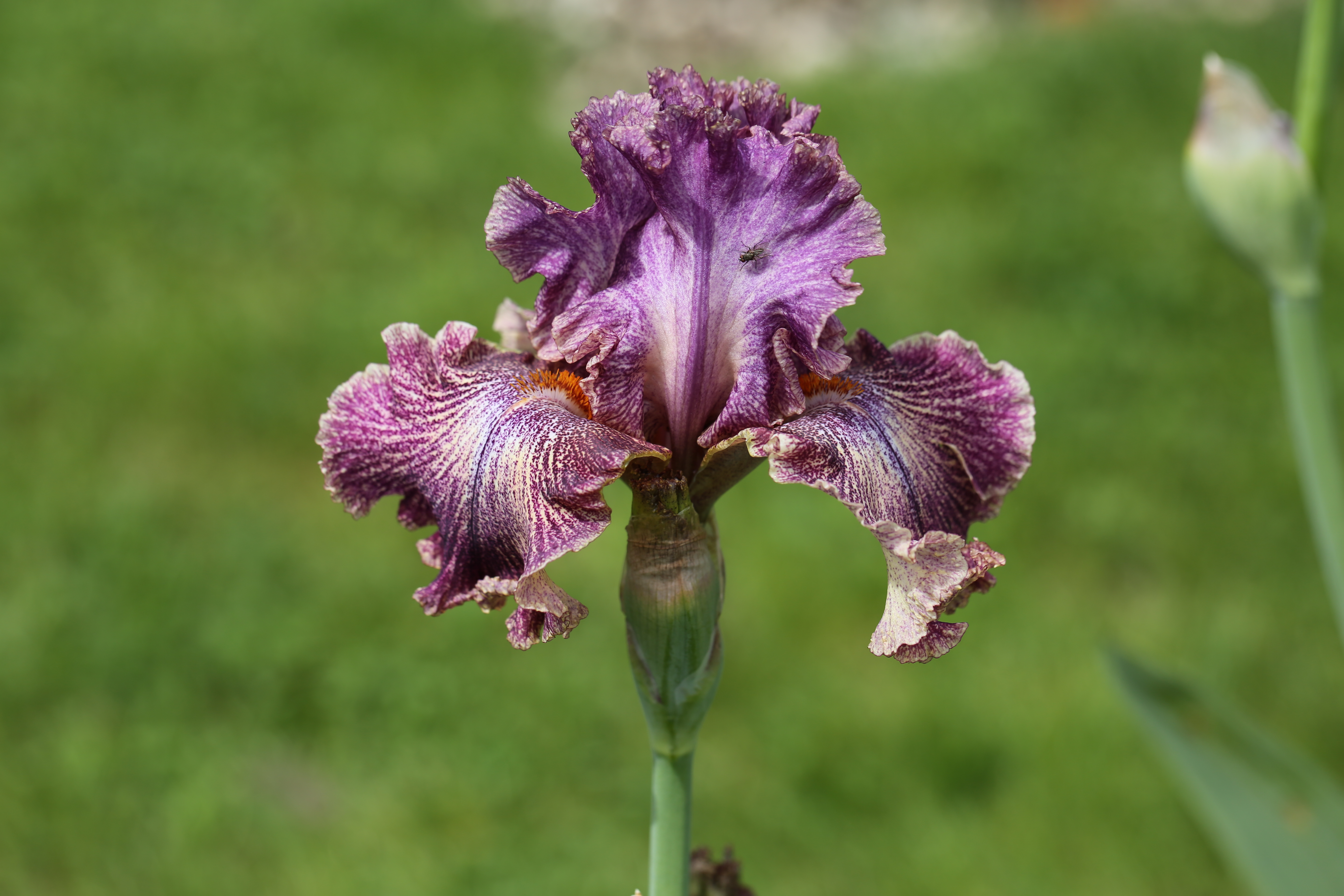
Iris Germanica 'Queen Calico'

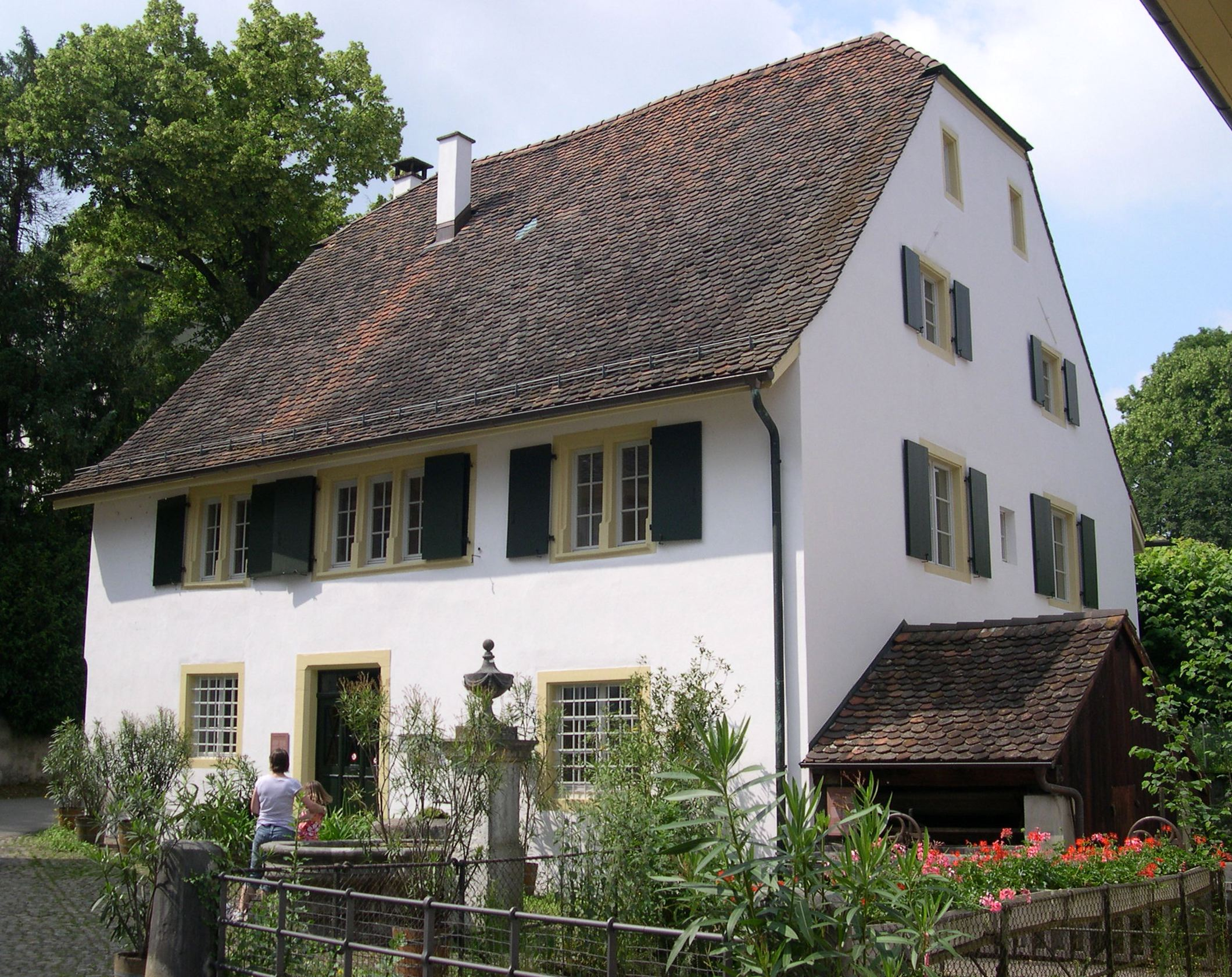
Millmuseum in the Merian Gardens
