= Christoph Merian =

Swiss banker

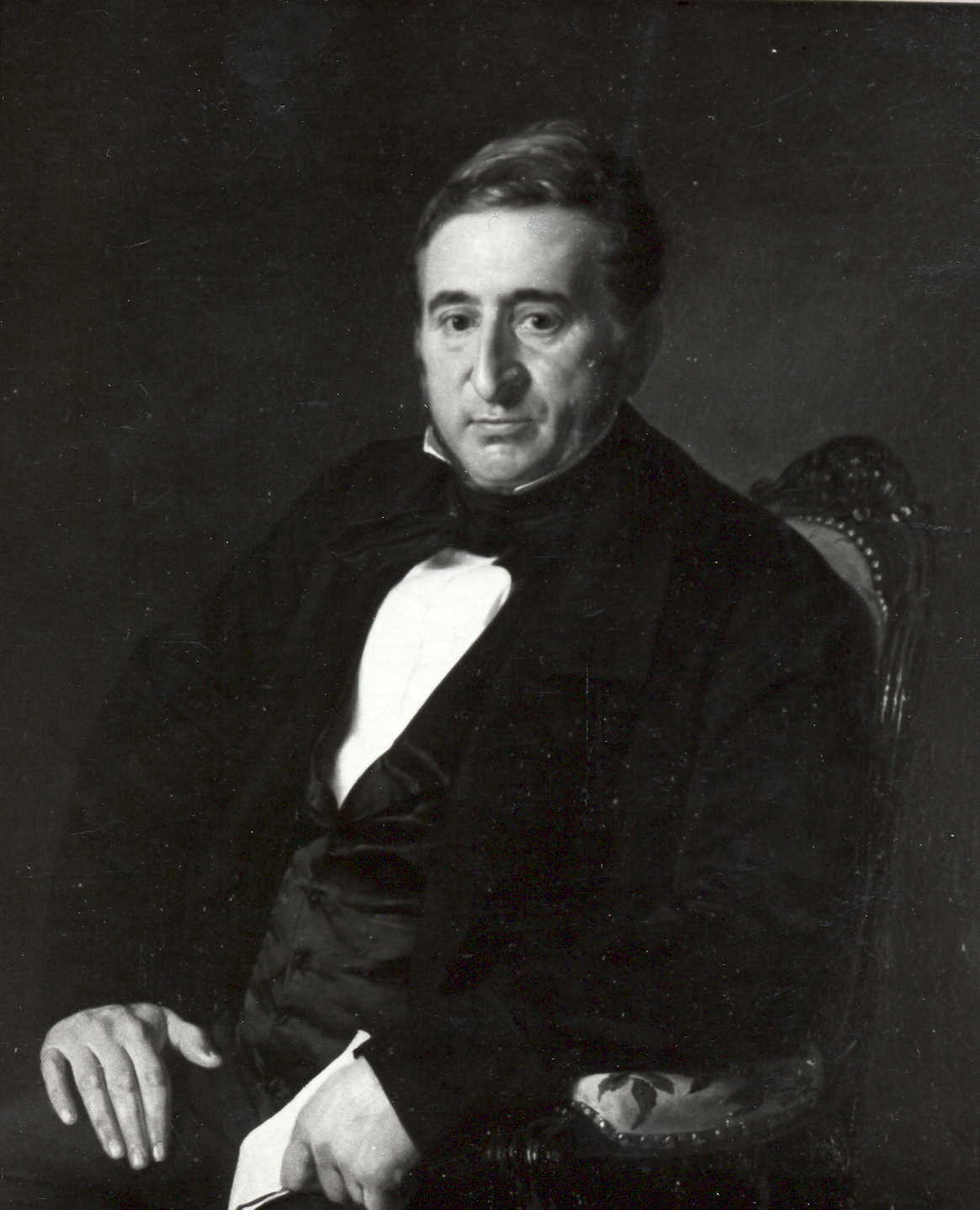
- Born: Christoph Merian; 22 January 1800; Basel, Switzerland
- Died: 22 August 1858 (aged 58); Basel, Switzerland
- Occupations: Businessman, banker, land owner
- Known for: Founder of the Christoph Merian Foundation; Largest land owner in Switzerland
- Spouse: Margaretha Burckhardt (m. 1824)
- Family: Merian family

Christoph Merian (22 January 1800 – 22 August 1858) was a Swiss banker, businessman, land owner and philanthropist of the Merian family. In 1840, Merian was the largest private land owner in Switzerland and one of the richest Swiss citizens.

== Early life and education ==
Merian was born 22 January 1800 in Basel, Switzerland, to Christoph Merian Sr. (1769–1849), a merchant and manufacturer, and Valeria Merian (née Hoffmann). He had five siblings, of whom four died prematurely, and his sister Susanna died aged 25.

His father was once the richest Swiss citizen with an estimated net worth of 9 million Swiss Francs at the time of his death in 1849 (approximately 450 million in 2025). He was a member of the older lineage of the Merian family belonging to the Daig (Switzerland). The family initially lived in the Haus zum Delphin; later they moved into a house on the St. Alban Graben. In 1811, his father bought the estate in Brüglingen, Münchenstein where the family would spend the summer.

He attended the private boys school of Johann Heinrich Munzinger from 1805 to 1808 and then entered Gymnasium Zur Burg. In 1815, the family settled in Mannheim and by 1816 he began his apprenticeship as a merchant. In 1818, he began an education as an agronomist and visited the "Landwirtschaftliches Institut Hofwil" (agricultural institute of Hofwil) of Phillipp Emanuel von Fellenberg near Bern. The institute was well-known and had several members of the European and Russian nobility among its alumni. Several young men from Basel also attended the agricultural institute.

During the year he stayed in Hofwil, he attended classes on planting, preparation of the soil, fertilizer treatment, breeding, the mechanization of agriculture and veterinary medicine. In 1819, he enrolled into the "Landwirtschaftliche Akademie" (agricultural academy) in Hohenheim near Stuttgart in 1818, where the cultivation of forests was a primary field of education. Hohenheim was a boarding school in which, besides forestry, classes in mineralogy, chemistry, and veterinary medicine were included in the curriculum and the students were free to attend the classes they wanted. He stayed in Hohenheim until 1821, following which he accompanied Theodor von Speyr, a merchant in his father's service, on a journey to London, Liverpool, and Dover in England, and Calais and Paris in France.

== Professional career ==
He lived as a banker, businessman and agriculturist on the farming estate of Brüglingen in Münchenstein near Basel. He achieved large financial gains with his firm "Frères Merian" in by-passing the Napoleonic Continental System.

== Legacy ==
Today, he is remembered mainly for founding the Christoph Merian Stiftung (Christoph Merian Foundation - CMS), a highly visible non-profit entity that continues to support social, cultural, ecological and economic projects to the benefit of the general population in the Basel region to this day. As of 2006, its worth was 289 million Swiss Francs, in addition to the 900 ha of land it owns. The institution was founded in Christoph Merian's Testament (dated 26.03.1857), in which he made an endowment/beneficence to the city of Basel. This came into legal effect when his widow Margaretha (1806-1886) died on 3 May 1886. He and his wife are buried in the Elisabethenkirche, whose construction he encouraged and also financed. The Merian Gardens are located in the estate he received for his wedding. When the city of Basel rebuilt the Middle Bridge in Basel, the Government of Basel did not have sufficient financial means, so the CMS financed 3/4 of the cost of building the bridge.

== Personal life ==
He was born into the Merian family, one of the most distinguished, aristocratic families in Basel. In 1824, he married Margarethe Burckhardt, the daughter of an industrialist. As a wedding present, they received the country estate in Brüglingen and the country house Villa Merian, which his father had bought in 1811. He subsequently enlarged the estate several times, and at the time of his death it spanned over 324 hectares. His father, Christoph Merian Senior, was a merchant who started with handling raw cotton, later with shipping/transport, banking and various speculative businesses. Christoph Merian Senior ended his various businesses in 1810 and subsequently invested in the industry and banking activities.

== Literature ==
- Gustav Adolf Wanner: Christoph Merian, Basel, 1958
- Rudolf Suter: Die Christoph Merian Stiftung, Basel, 1986
