= Elisabethenkirche, Basel =

Church in Switzerland

Coordinates: 47°33′10″N 7°35′28″E

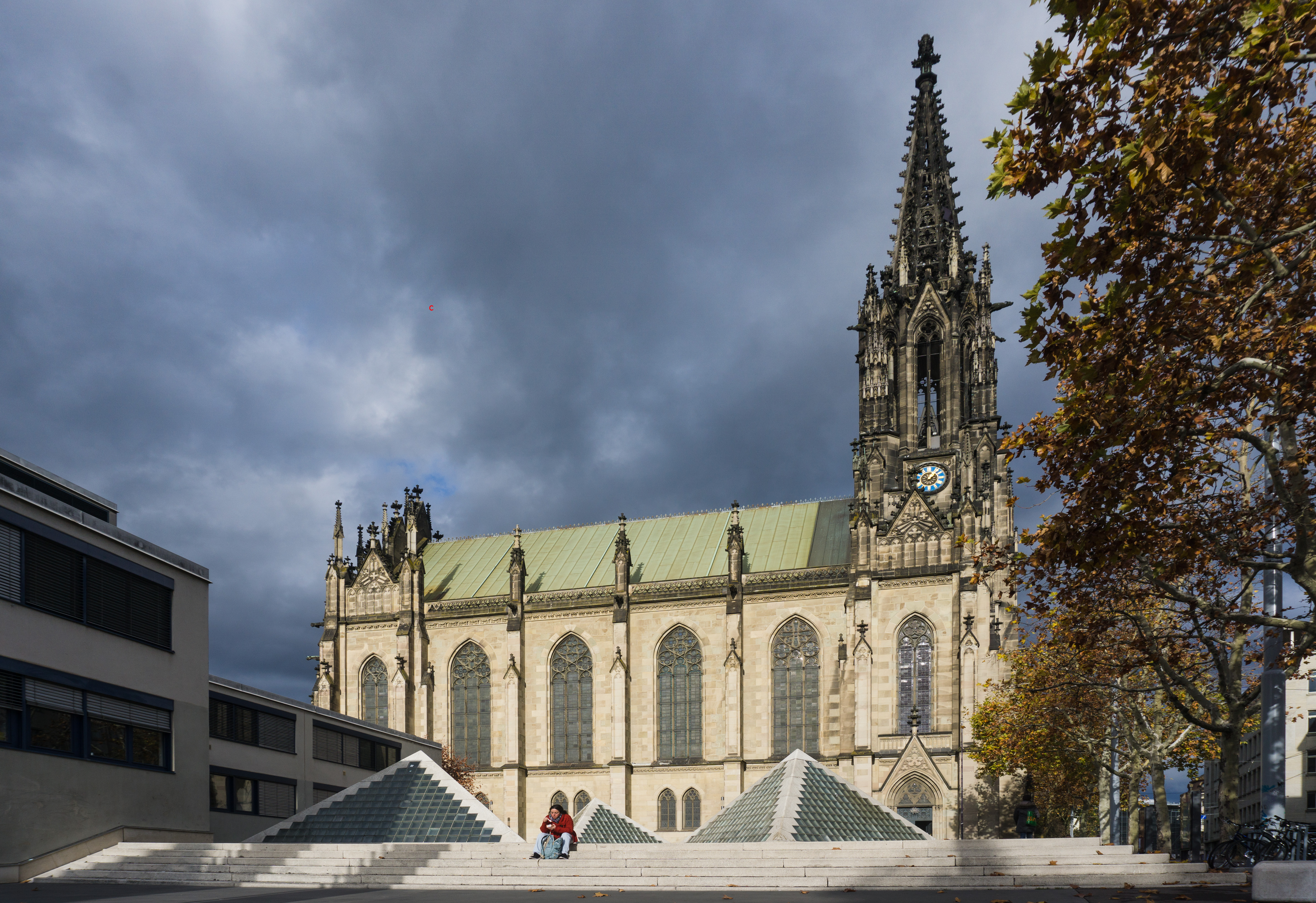
Elisabethenkirche and centre square.

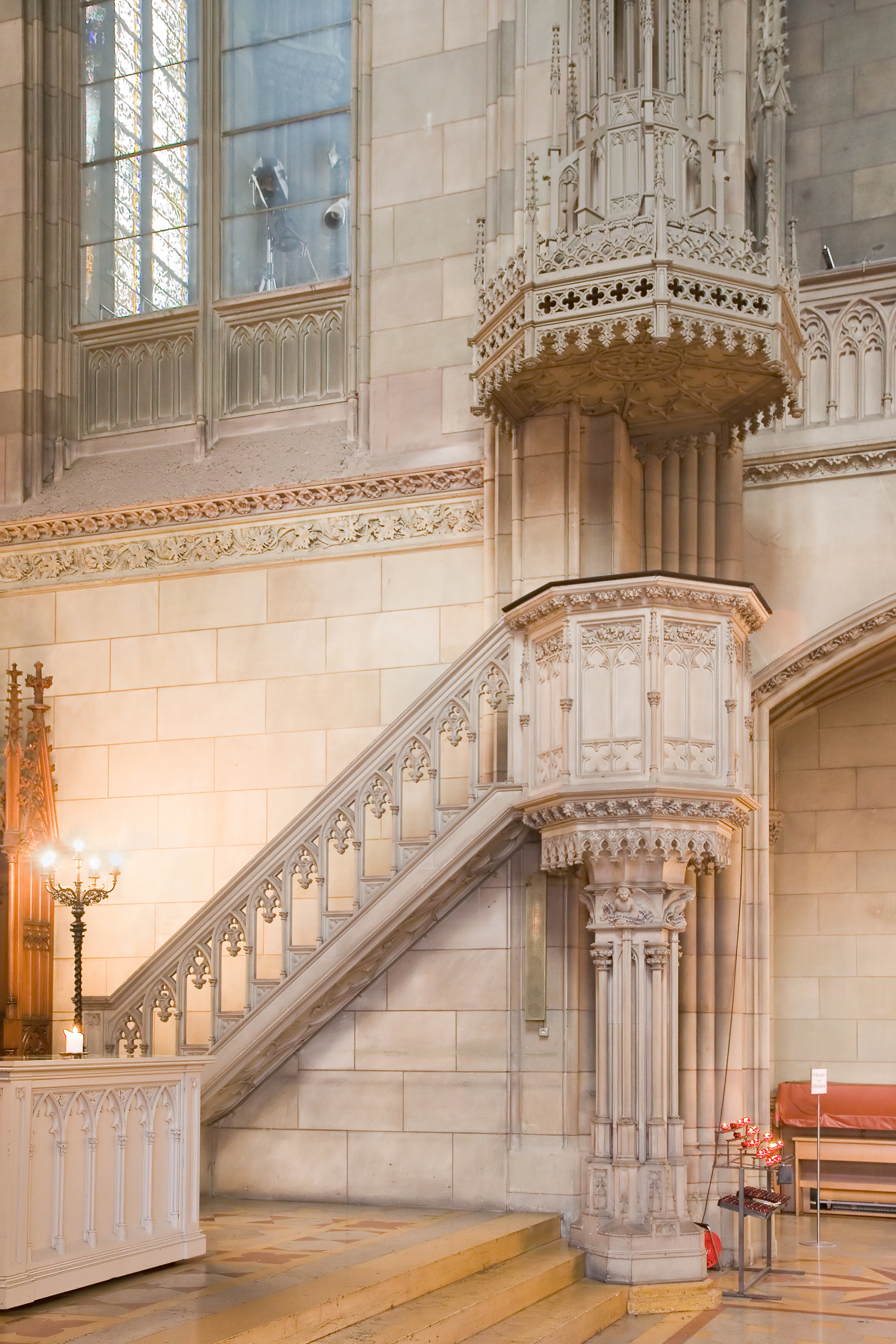
Stone pulpit, with a carved wood canopy.

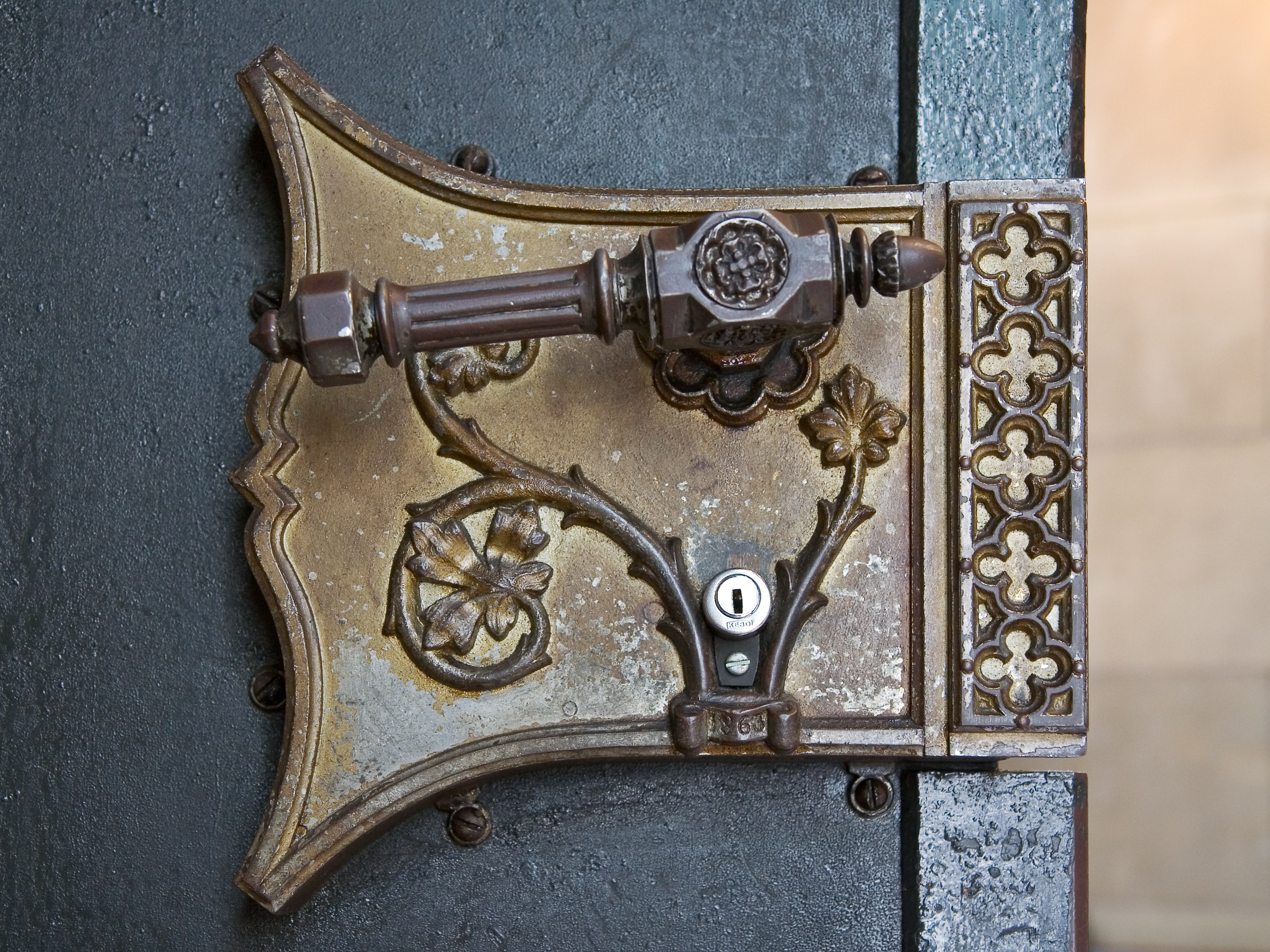
Church lock, marked with the year 1863.

The Elisabethenkirche, or Offene Kirche Elisabethen, is a 19th-century church building in the centre of Basel, next to the Theater Basel, in Switzerland. It is a well detailed example of Swiss Gothic Revival style churches. It has a 72 metres (236 ft) tall bell tower and spire. The tower has internal stairs.

== History ==
The church construction begun in 1857 and was completed in 1864. Its architect was Ferdinand Stadler and it was the first new church erected in Basel following the reformation. Its construction was sponsored by the wealthy businessman Christoph Merian and his wife Margarethe Burckhardt-Merian, which were both laid to rest in the church in black marble sarcophagi in the crypt below the church's main floor. Christoph Merian did not oversee the completion of the church as he died in 1858. The Merians also founded the Christoph-Merian-Stiftung. Today's congregation forms part of the Evangelical-Reformed Church of the Canton Basel-Stadt.

== Present day ==
Today the church is home of the first Swiss "OpenChurch" or Offene Kirche Elisabethen. The Offene Kirche Elisabethen caters to the spiritual, cultural and social needs of urban people of all backgrounds. It is also known for their support of the LGBT community.

The Offene Kirche Elisabethen is well known throughout the region for their Fasnachtsgottesdienst, a service in honor of the Carnival of Basel. The Church has also served as the venue for punk concerts and at times it was converted into a club.

Schöpfungsfeier (service with blessing of the human-animal relation), Heilungsfeiern (weekly and trimesterly healing-/blessing services for people in need and sorrow) and their gender aware spiritual practice.

Nearly 50'000 people visit the church per year.

== See also ==
- Churches in Basel
