= Enge =

Enge may refer to:

- Enge (surname)
- Enge (EP)
- Enge (Zürich), a quarter of the city of Zürich, Switzerland
- Enge, Estonia, village in Halinga Parish, Pärnu County, Estonia
- Enge River, river in Estonia
- En-ge, a Cyrillic letter (Ҥ ҥ)
