= Stadtkirche Glarus =

Church in Glarus, Switzerland

Coordinates: 47°02′25″N 9°03′56″E

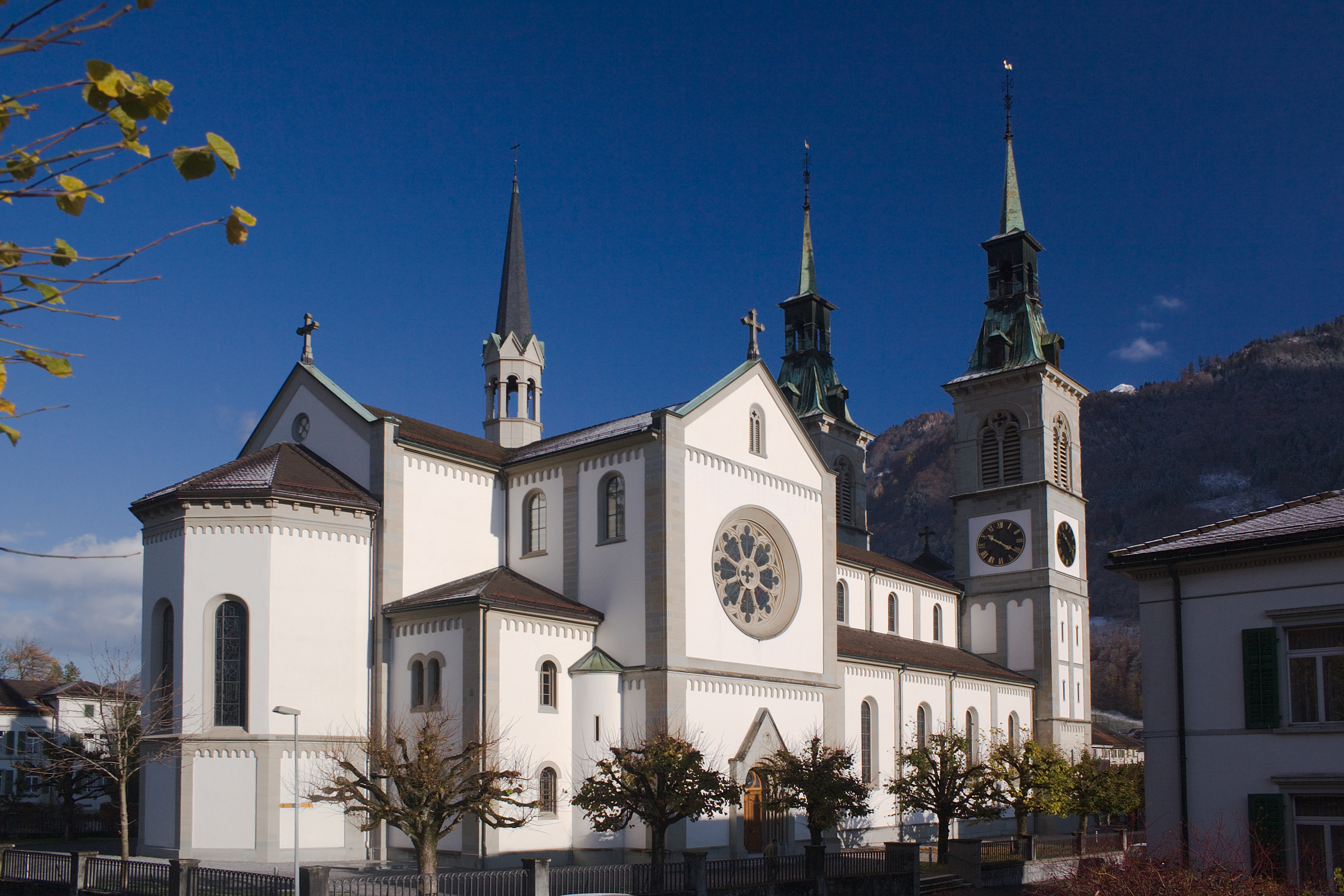
Exterior

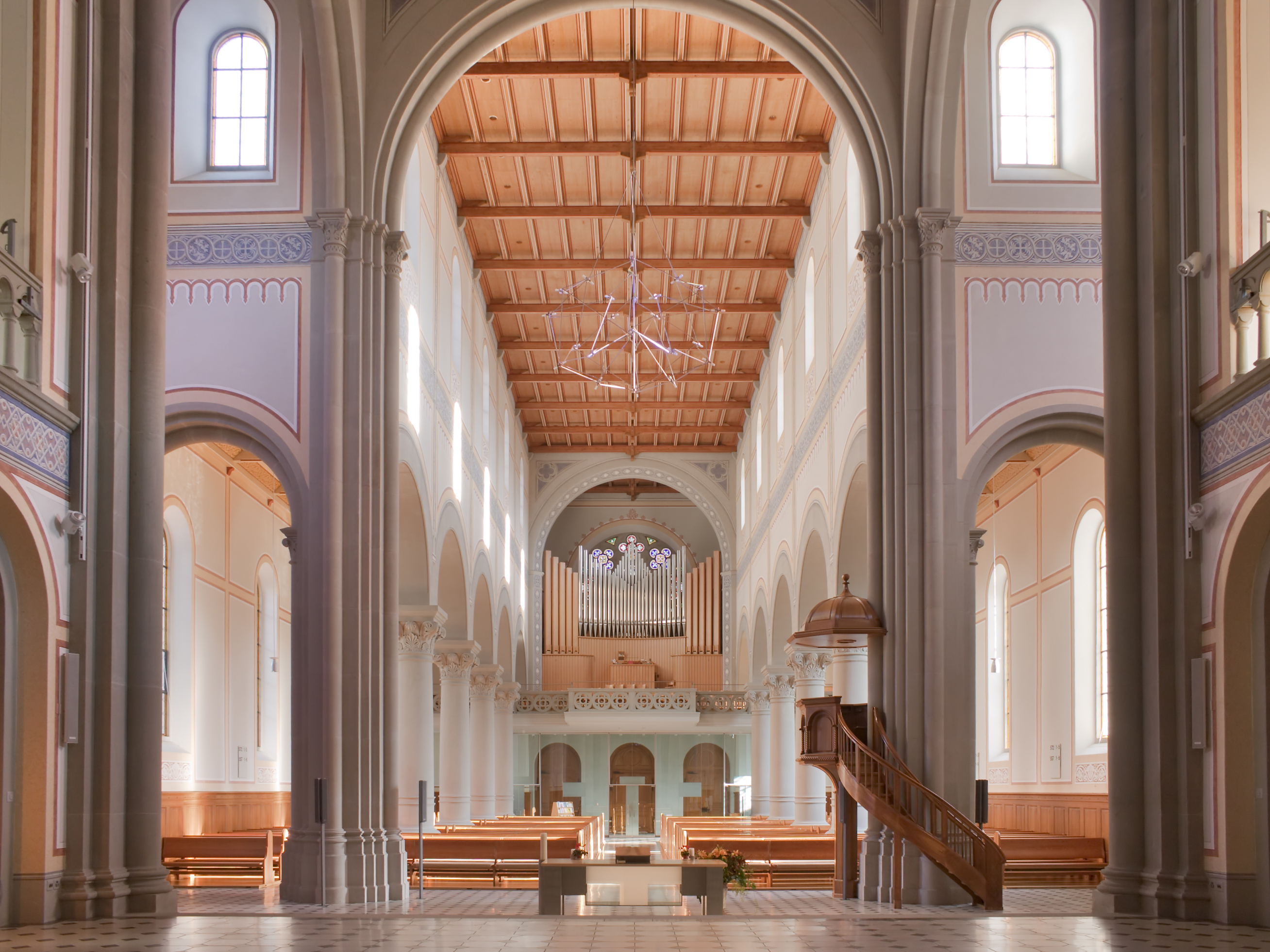
Nave of the Stadtkirche

The Stadtkirche Glarus is the main Reformed church for the city of Glarus in the canton of Glarus in Switzerland.
