= Villa Merian =

Coordinates: 47°32′15″N 7°36′52″E

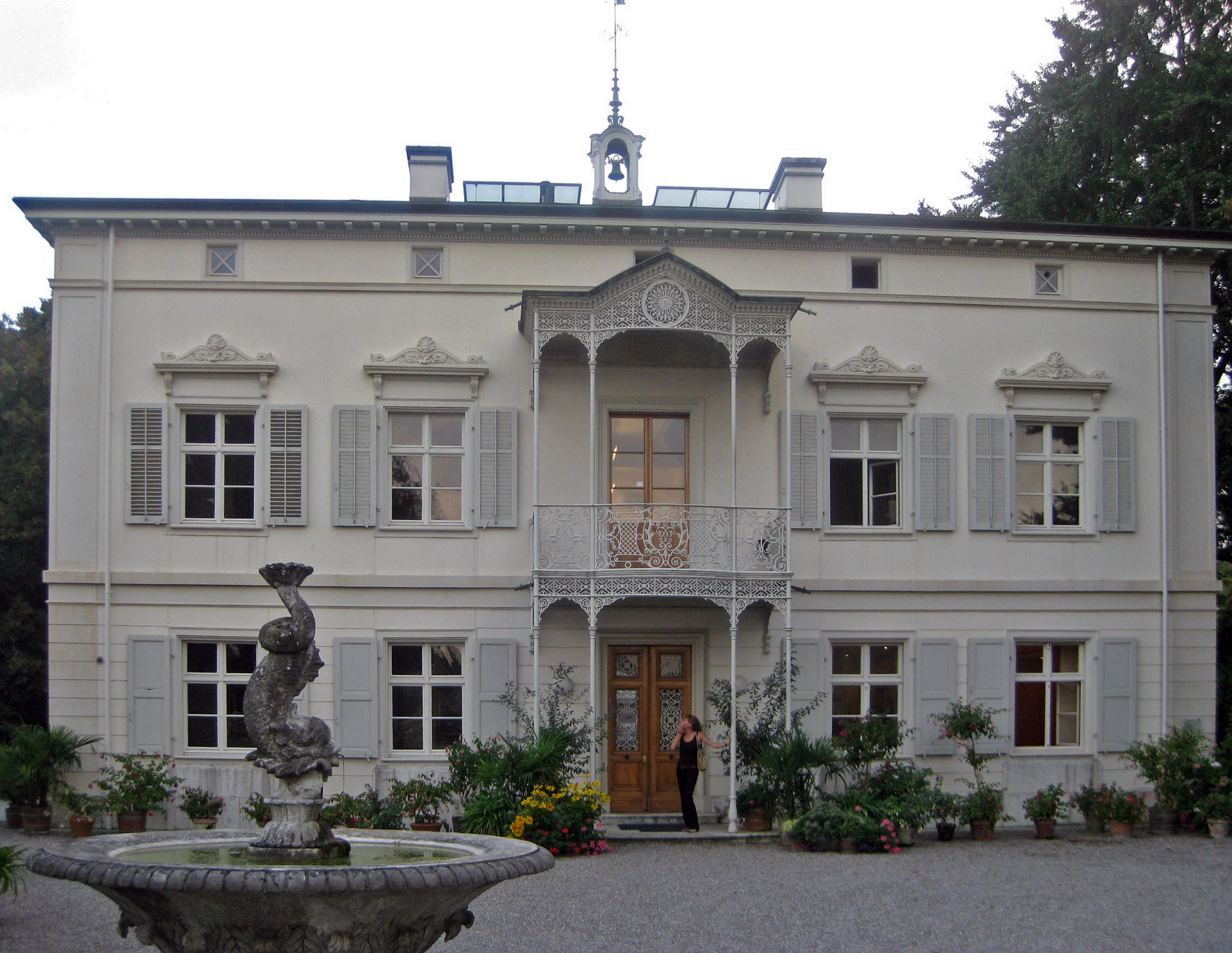
Villa Merian, Münchenstein, Main Entrance

The Villa Merian, with its English Garden, stands on the elevated plain above Brüglingen in Münchenstein, in the canton of Basel-Country in Switzerland.

== Geographical location ==
The geographical area Brüglingen is a plane region that lies along the western bank of the river Birs between St. Jacob an der Birs (now part of Basel) and Münchenstein. The Villa Merian, with its English Garden, stands upon the elevated plain directly above the Watermill Museum Brüglingen.

== History ==
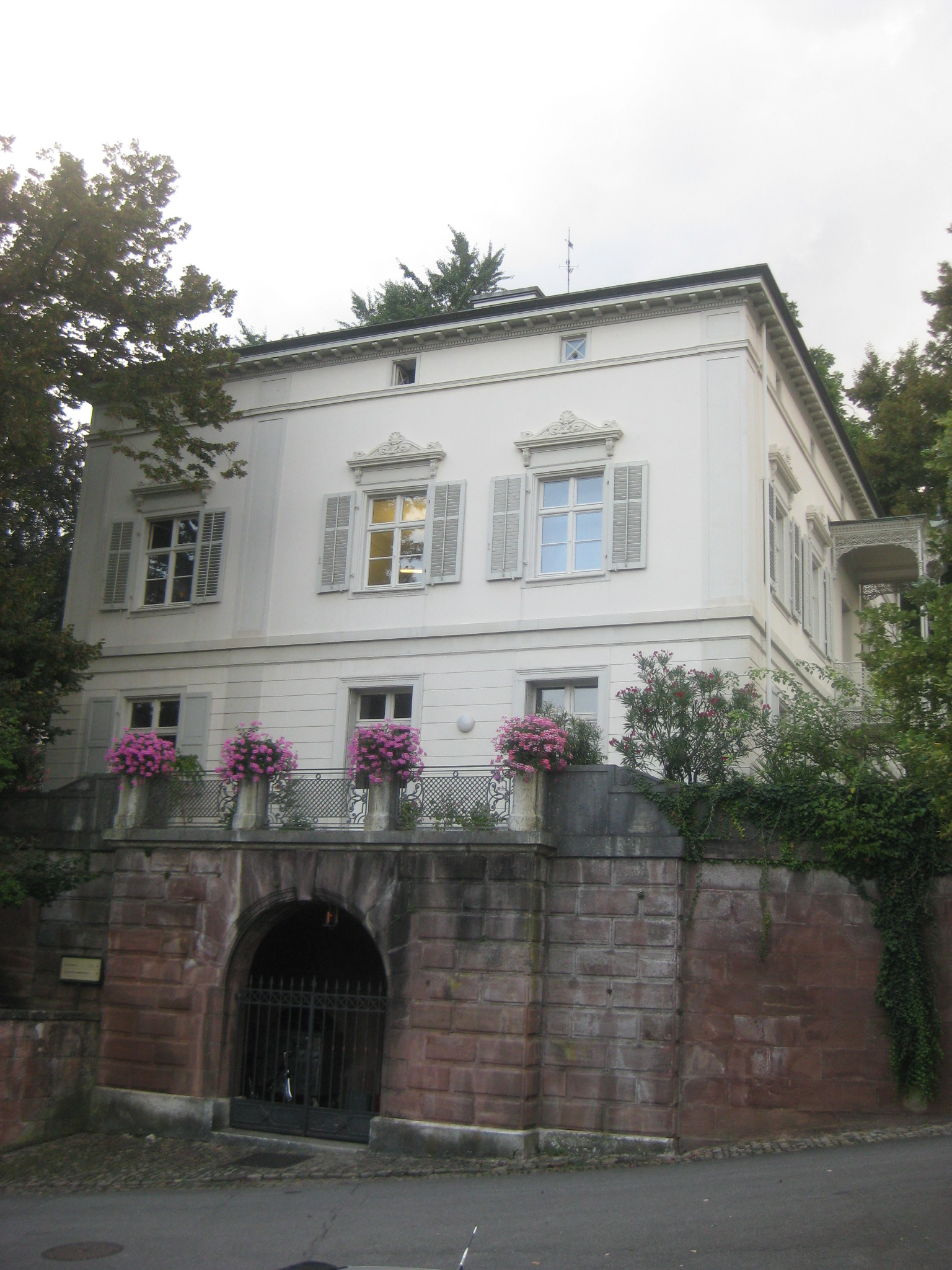
Northern side facade of Villa Merian, with cellars entrance.

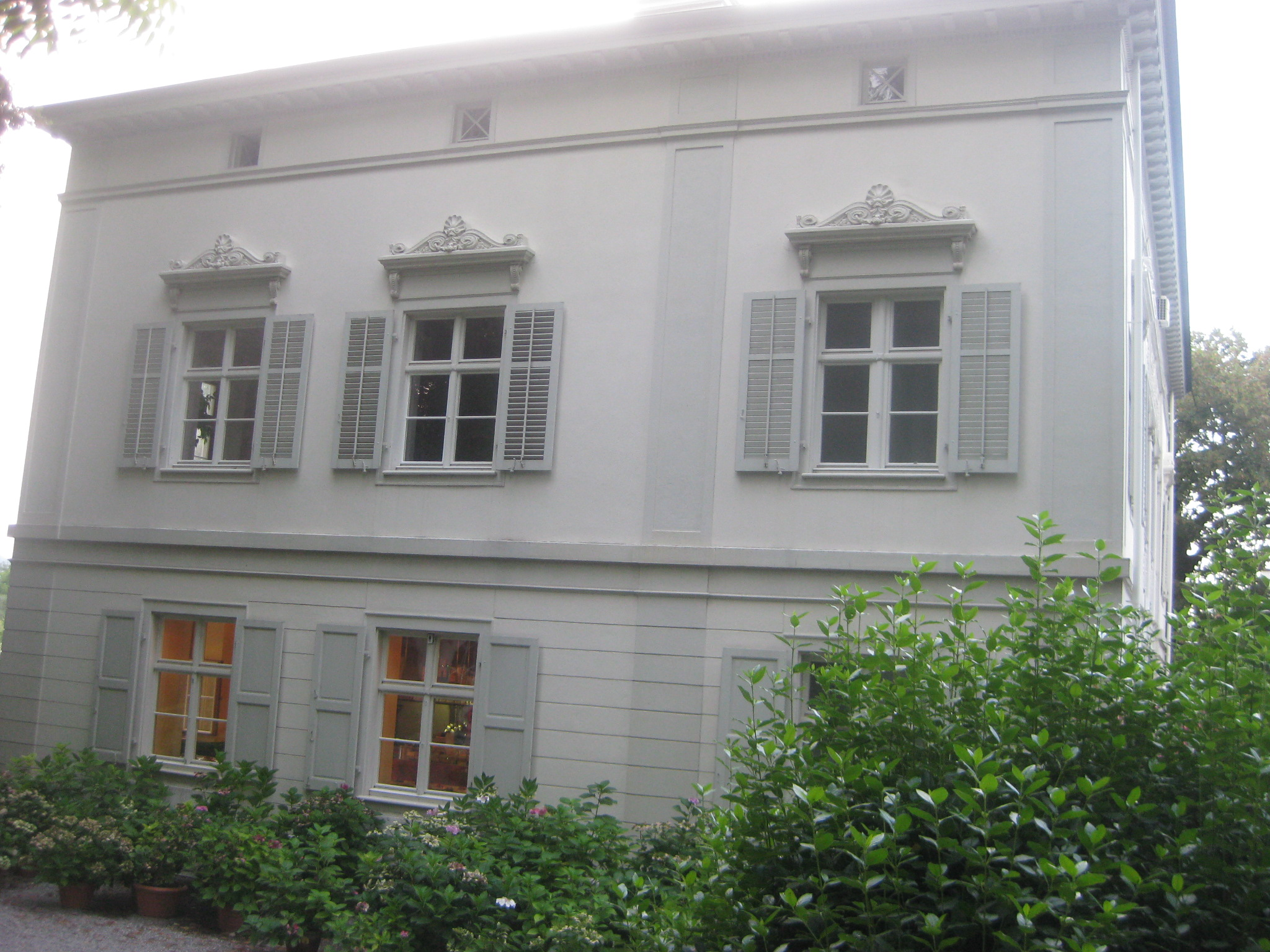
Southern side facade of Villa Merian.

=== Manor house ===
The original manor house was built in 1711 Baroque style by Alexander Löffler, above the watermill and the canal. The two storey building was covered by a gentle sloped hipped roof. Before the northern cladding there was a courtyard. To the south there was an arboretum and plant nursery. On the western side there was a tower and a gardening house. Built onto the rear of the house was a polygonal tower with spiral staircase.

In 1801 the manor was rebuilt in early Neoclassical style. The polygonal tower with stairway and the tower to the west were removed. The staircase was relocated internally. A winter garden, with a pergola above it, was built onto the rear of the villa. A pillared portico was placed in front of the main entrance. Above the structure of the hip roof a parapet was drawn in and installed as fixed-point mounting.

Approximately ten years later the stately home and its properties were acquired by Christoph Merian-Hoffmann, and in 1824 he gave the estate to his son Christoph Merian as wedding present. The Villa Merian was used by Christoph Merian and his wife Margarethe as a summer residence.

During 1858/59 Christoph Merian rebuilt the villa in Second Empire style. The architect Johann Jakob Stehlin-Burckhardt from Basel received the assignment. Although Stehlin proposed a new building, Merian restricted the rebuild to a refurbishment. The quintessential walls were roughcast and clad with cast iron and iron mouldings. The ground floor was clad with imitation ashlar and the windows were summated with acroterion. The first and second floors were separated by Gesims and the outer corners of the building were reinforced. The roof parapet was replaced by an Attica and covered by a hipped roof, the crown of which is concluded by a belfry. The portico at the front entrance was replaced by a two storey cast iron pavilion, the projecting roof being used as a balcony. To the rear the winter garden and pergola were replaced by a three axe cast iron open hall way that was encased with artificial marble. The stairway was replaced and finished with elaborate iron rolling bars, the room arrangement remained unaltered.

Christoph Merian died in 1858 before the refurbishment works were completed. Despite this the Villa was still used by his widow Margaretha Merian-Burckhardt as her summer residence. She died on 3 May 1886. With her death the will of her husband became legally binding and the public utility institution Christoph Merian Stiftung came into effect and inherited the manor Brüglingen and the five affiliated farmyards (Singerhof, St. Jakob, Ziegelhütte, Unter- und Vorder-Brüglingen)

=== Other buildings ===
Standing in Unteren Brüglingen, the lower district, is a mill from the 15th century. On the opposite side of the canal there is a tenantry house from the 16th century and a gardeners house dated 1824.

In 1837 the architect Melchior Berri developed another farm house north of the manor house with an outbuilding with stables, in Vorder-Brüglingen, the "front" district of Brügglingen on the elevated plain. This raised plateau offers an ideal terrain for an English garden. To the south of the manor house gardens is Merian Park, which extends south to the Neue Welt district in Münchenstein.

== Modern history ==
The Gothic Revival style watermill building has housed a museum since 1966. It is located on the bank of the "St. Alban-Teich" canal directly below the villa.

In 1967 the institution Christoph Merian Stiftung made the decision to lease the villa and the estate to the city of Basel, gratuitously for one hundred years, so that a botanical garden could be established on the grounds.

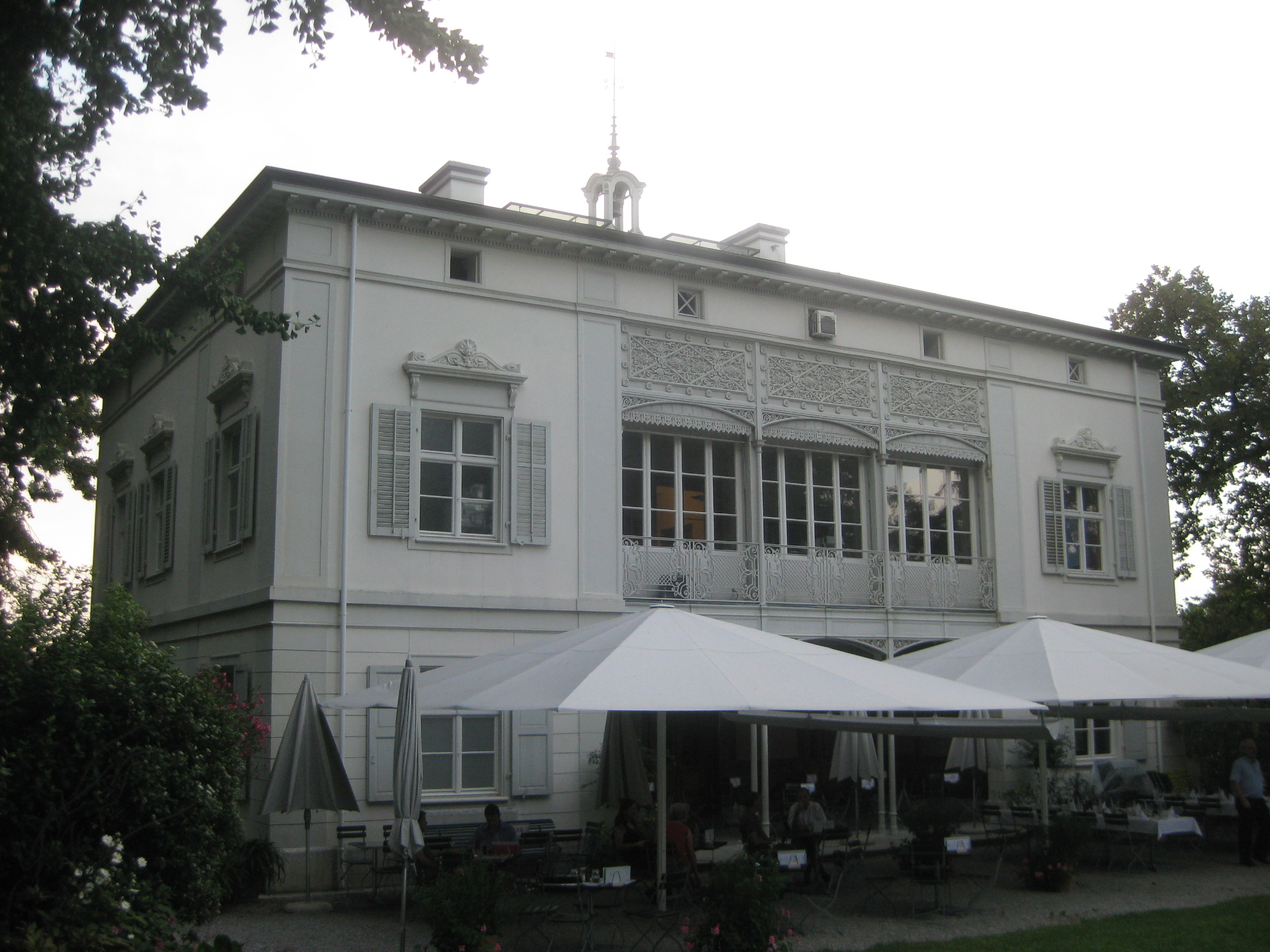
Rear facade and terrace of Villa Merian.

=== Grün 80 ===
During the summer of 1980 Münchenstein was the host municipality for Grün 80, the 2nd Swiss exhibition for gardens and landscaping. The exhibition was held in Brüglingen and also made benefit of the entire estate grounds. The remains of the Grün 80 exhibition complex, and the villa's gardens and landscape, are now a public park named Merian Park. The botanical gardens are within the borders of Merian Park and cover an area of 135,000 m^{2}.

With a view to the Grün 80, during 1977, the Villa Merian was overhauled and became a coffee house. Since then the Villa has been reconverted and redecorated. The two cast iron verandas on either side of the house were removed, but all the other cast iron prefabricated units and the inner decorations were carefully restored. In the lower floor various demolition works were carried out and new toilets for the coffee house were installed, while the unused arched cellar and basements were rebuilt so that they could be utilized. The painted, stuccoed ceilings with their gold-plated ornaments, the wall panelling, the bas-relief, overdoors and the parquetry were all completely restored.

The tower heating furnace, previously removed and stored in the basement, was reinstalled in the parlour. The entrance hall, the three axe cast iron hallway and the entire first floor were left unaltered, but ceilings, walls and floors were redecorated. In the attic area the walls were demolished, the hipped roof had windows built in, and it was insulated. Three seminar rooms and a central zone with restrooms then were created there.

== Literature ==
- Hans Rudolf Heyer: Brüglingen (Schweizerische Kunstführer). Bern 1977.
- Rudolf Suter: Die Christoph Merian Stiftung. Basel 1986.
- Gustav Adolf Wanner: Christoph Merian. Basel 1958.
