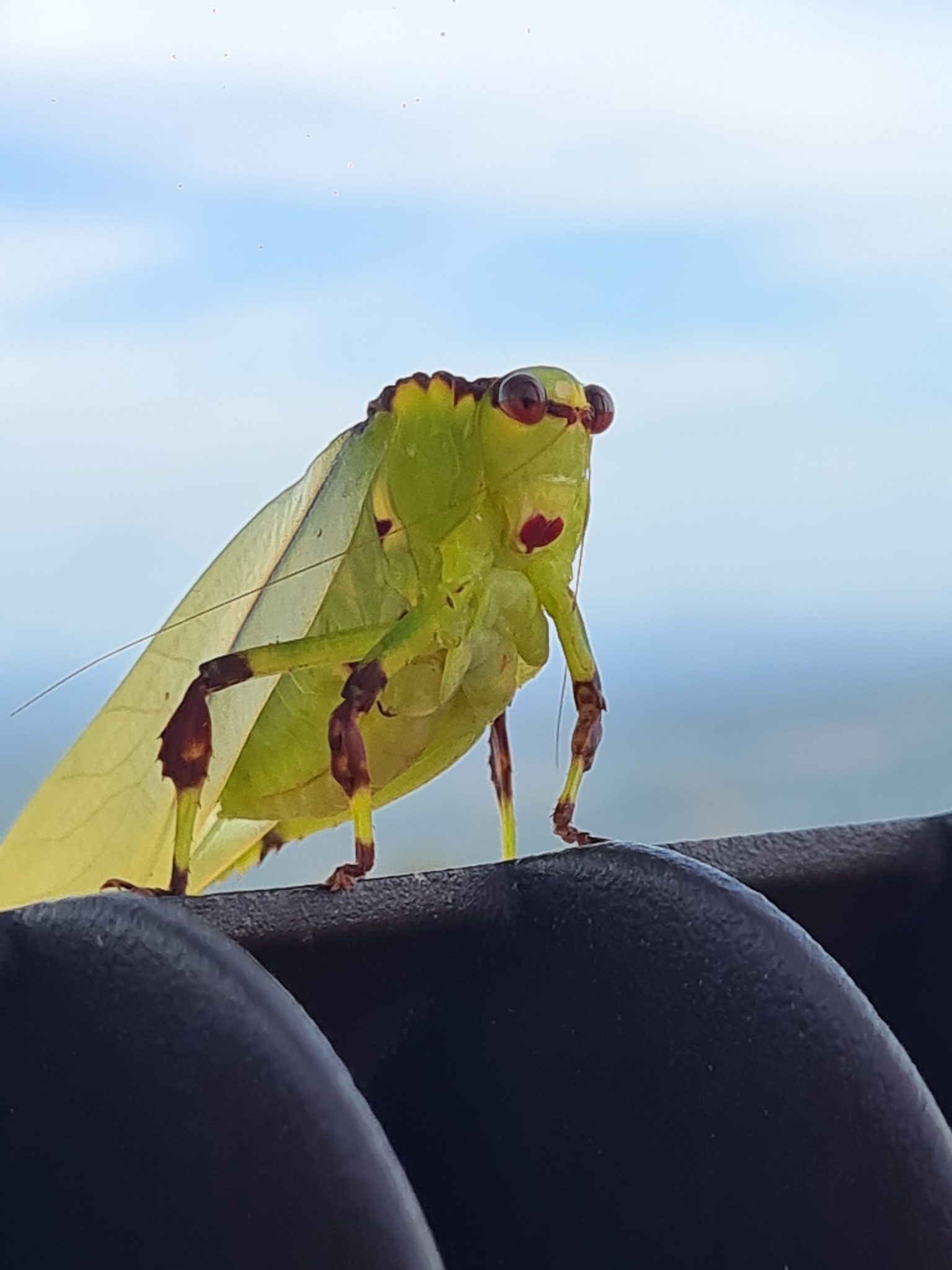

Scientific classification
- Kingdom: Animalia
- Phylum: Arthropoda
- Class: Insecta
- Order: Orthoptera
- Suborder: Ensifera
- Family: Tettigoniidae
- Subfamily: Phaneropterinae
- Genus: Cnemidophyllum
- Species: C. lineatum

Binomial name
- Cnemidophyllum lineatum (Brunner von Wattenwyl, 1891)

= Cnemidophyllum lineatum =

Species of insect

Cnemidophyllum lineatum is a species of insect from the genus Cnemidophyllum.
