= Mirollia =

Scientific classification
- Domain: Eukaryota
- Kingdom: Animalia
- Phylum: Arthropoda
- Class: Insecta
- Order: Orthoptera
- Suborder: Ensifera
- Family: Tettigoniidae
- Subfamily: Phaneropterinae
- Tribe: Mirolliini
- Genus: Mirollia; Stål, 1873

Genus of cricket-like animals

External image
- Image at iNaturalist

Mirollia is the type genus of Asian bush crickets of the tribe Mirolliini: in the subfamily Phaneropterinae. Species have been recorded from India, southern China, Indochina and Malesia.

== Species ==
The Orthoptera Species File lists:

1. Mirollia acutilobata Wang, Wang & Shi, 2015
2. Mirollia aeta Hebard, 1922
3. Mirollia amplecta Wang, Wang & Shi, 2015
4. Mirollia angusticerca Gorochov & Kang, 2004
5. Mirollia beybienkoi Gorochov, 1998
6. Mirollia bigemina Ingrisch, 1998
7. Mirollia bispina Shi, Chang & Chen, 2005
8. Mirollia bispinosa Gorochov & Kang, 2004
9. Mirollia caligata Ingrisch, 1998
10. Mirollia carinata (Haan, 1843) - type species (as Locusta carinata Haan) - synonyms include M. abnormis Karny, 1926
11. Mirollia cerciata Hebard, 1922
12. Mirollia cincticornis Karny, 1926
13. Mirollia composita Bey-Bienko, 1962
14. Mirollia compressa Ingrisch & Shishodia, 2000
15. Mirollia deficientis Gorochov, 2005
16. Mirollia elegantia Gorochov, 2005
17. Mirollia fallax Bey-Bienko, 1962
18. Mirollia folium Gorochov, 1998
19. Mirollia forcipata Ingrisch, 2011
20. Mirollia formosana Shiraki, 1930
21. Mirollia hainani Gorochov & Kang, 2004
22. Mirollia hamata Ingrisch, 1998
23. Mirollia hexapinna Ingrisch, 1998
24. Mirollia imitata Gorochov, 2008
25. Mirollia javae Gorochov, 1998
26. Mirollia lanceolata Shi & Wang, 2005
27. Mirollia lata Gorochov, 2008
28. Mirollia liui Bey-Bienko, 1957
29. Mirollia longipinna Ingrisch & Shishodia, 1998
30. Mirollia maculosus Wang, Wang & Shi, 2015
31. Mirollia malaya Ingrisch, 2011
32. Mirollia multidentus Shi, Chang & Chen, 2005
33. Mirollia obscuripennis Liu, 2004
34. Mirollia paralata Ingrisch, 2011
35. Mirollia petiolulata Wang, Wang & Shi, 2015
36. Mirollia proxima Gorochov, 1998
37. Mirollia quadripunctata Ingrisch, 1990
38. Mirollia ranongi Gorochov, 1998
39. Mirollia rostellum Gorochov, 2003
40. Mirollia rufonotata Mu, He & Wang, 1998
41. Mirollia rumidi Ingrisch, 2011
42. Mirollia secunda Ingrisch, 2011
43. Mirollia spinulosa Ingrisch, 2011
44. Mirollia tawai Ingrisch, 2011
45. Mirollia terminalis Wang, Wang & Shi, 2015
46. Mirollia unispina Wang, Wang & Shi, 2015
47. Mirollia yunnani Gorochov & Kang, 2004
