= Balneum =

Scientific classification
- Domain: Eukaryota
- Kingdom: Animalia
- Phylum: Arthropoda
- Class: Insecta
- Order: Orthoptera
- Suborder: Ensifera
- Family: Tettigoniidae
- Subfamily: Phaneropterinae
- Genus: Balneum; Piza, 1967

Genus of cricket-like animals

Balneum is a monotypic genus of bush crickets in the subfamily Phaneropterinae; the single species Balneum bivittatum Piza, 1967 is found in E. Brasil.
