= Baryprostha =

Scientific classification
- Domain: Eukaryota
- Kingdom: Animalia
- Phylum: Arthropoda
- Class: Insecta
- Order: Orthoptera
- Suborder: Ensifera
- Family: Tettigoniidae
- Subfamily: Phaneropterinae
- Genus: Baryprostha; Karsch, 1891

Genus of bush-crickets

External image
- Images at iNaturalist

Baryprostha is a genus of Asian sickle-bearing bush-crickets, not placed in any tribe ; it was erected by Ferdinand Karsch in 1891. The recorded distribution (probably incomplete) is Taiwan, Thailand and western Malesia.

== Species ==
The Orthoptera Species File lists:

1. Baryprostha bellua Karsch, 1891 - type species
2. Baryprostha bestiola Dohrn, 1906
3. Baryprostha foliacea Ingrisch, 1990
4. Baryprostha parva Liu, 2014
