= Quiva =

Scientific classification
- Domain: Eukaryota
- Kingdom: Animalia
- Phylum: Arthropoda
- Class: Insecta
- Order: Orthoptera
- Suborder: Ensifera
- Family: Tettigoniidae
- Subfamily: Phaneropterinae
- Tribe: Dysoniini
- Genus: Quiva; Hebard, 1927

Synonyms
- Itauna Piza, 1967

Genus of cricket-like animals

Quiva is a South American genus of bush cricket in the subfamily Phaneropterinae.

== Species ==
The Orthoptera Species File lists:

subgenus Paraquiva Cadena-Castañeda & Gorochov, 2013

1. Quiva angieae Cadena-Castañeda, 2013
2. Quiva obscura Mendes, 2022

subgenus Quiva Hebard, 1927

- species group abacata (Brunner von Wattenwyl, 1878)
1. Quiva abacata (Brunner von Wattenwyl, 1878)
2. Quiva gutjahrae Cadena-Castañeda, Mendes & Sovano, 2015
3. Quiva sharovi Gorochov, 2013
- species group diaphana Hebard, 1927
1. Quiva buhrnheimi Cadena-Castañeda, Mendes & Sovano, 2015
2. Quiva diaphana Hebard, 1927
3. Quiva pulchella Rehn, 1950
