= Poecilogramma =

Scientific classification
- Domain: Eukaryota
- Kingdom: Animalia
- Phylum: Arthropoda
- Class: Insecta
- Order: Orthoptera
- Suborder: Ensifera
- Family: Tettigoniidae
- Subfamily: Phaneropterinae
- Tribe: Pardalotini
- Genus: Poecilogramma; Karsch, 1887

Genus of insects

Poecilogramma is a genus of African sickle-bearing bush crickets in the tribe Pardalotini, described by Karsch in 1887.

== Species ==
The Orthoptera Species File lists:

1. Poecilogramma annulifemur Karsch, 1887
2. Poecilogramma cloetensi Griffini, 1908
3. Poecilogramma striatifemur Karsch, 1887 - type species
