= Cosmophyllum =

Scientific classification
- Domain: Eukaryota
- Kingdom: Animalia
- Phylum: Arthropoda
- Class: Insecta
- Order: Orthoptera
- Suborder: Ensifera
- Superfamily: Tettigonioidea
- Family: Tettigoniidae
- Subfamily: Phaneropterinae
- Genus: Cosmophyllum; Blanchard, 1851

Species
- Cosmophyllum olivaceum Blanchard, 1851; Cosmophyllum pallidulum Blanchard, 1851

Genus of cricket-like animals

Cosmophyllum is a genus of bush crickets in the subfamily Phaneropterinae. Species are found in Chile.

The name was also given to a genus of prehistoric hexacorals by E Vollbrecht in 1922 which was turned into a synonym for Arcophyllum, itself being turned into a subgenus of Mesophyllum.
