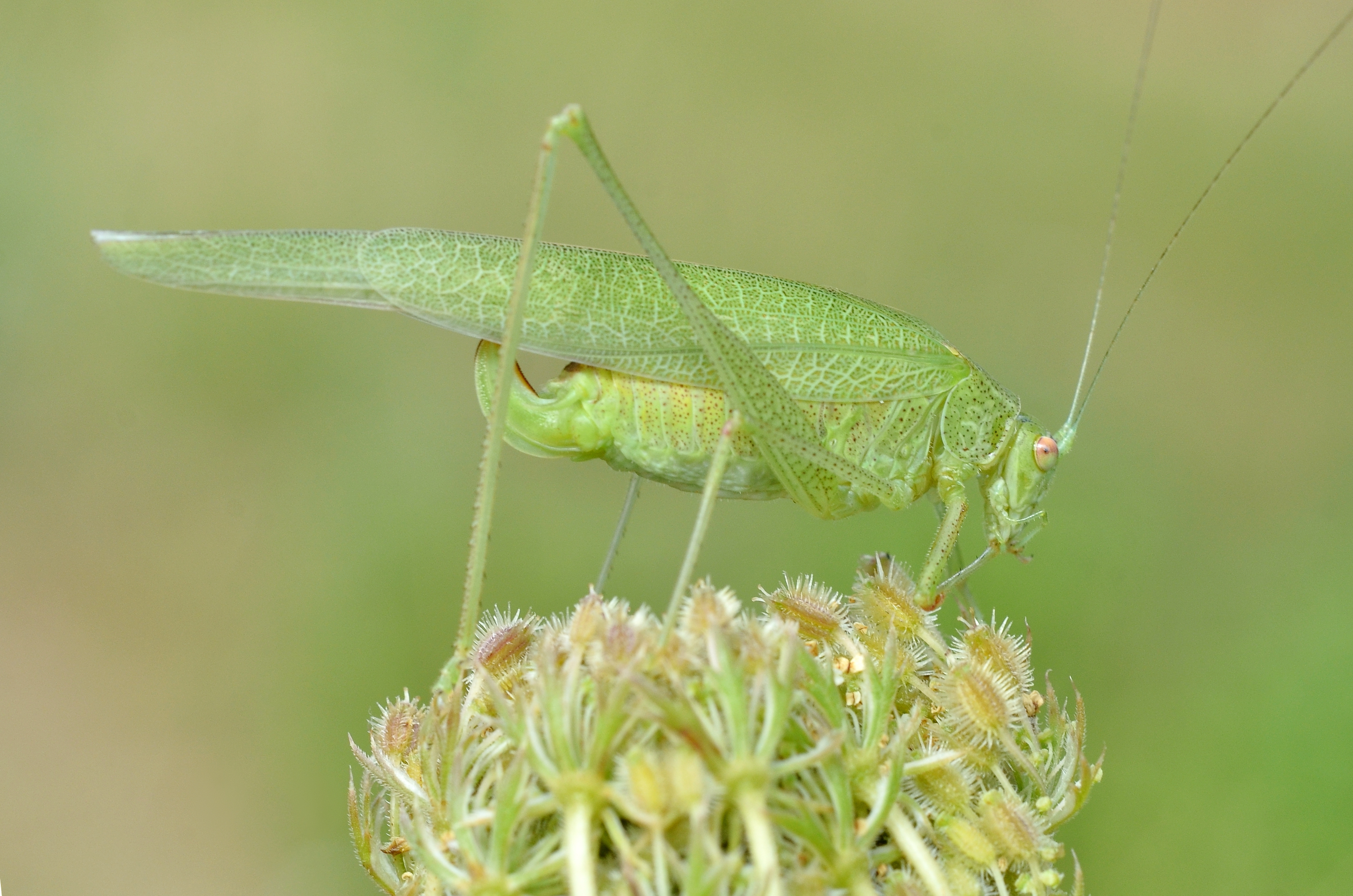
- Female Phaneroptera nana
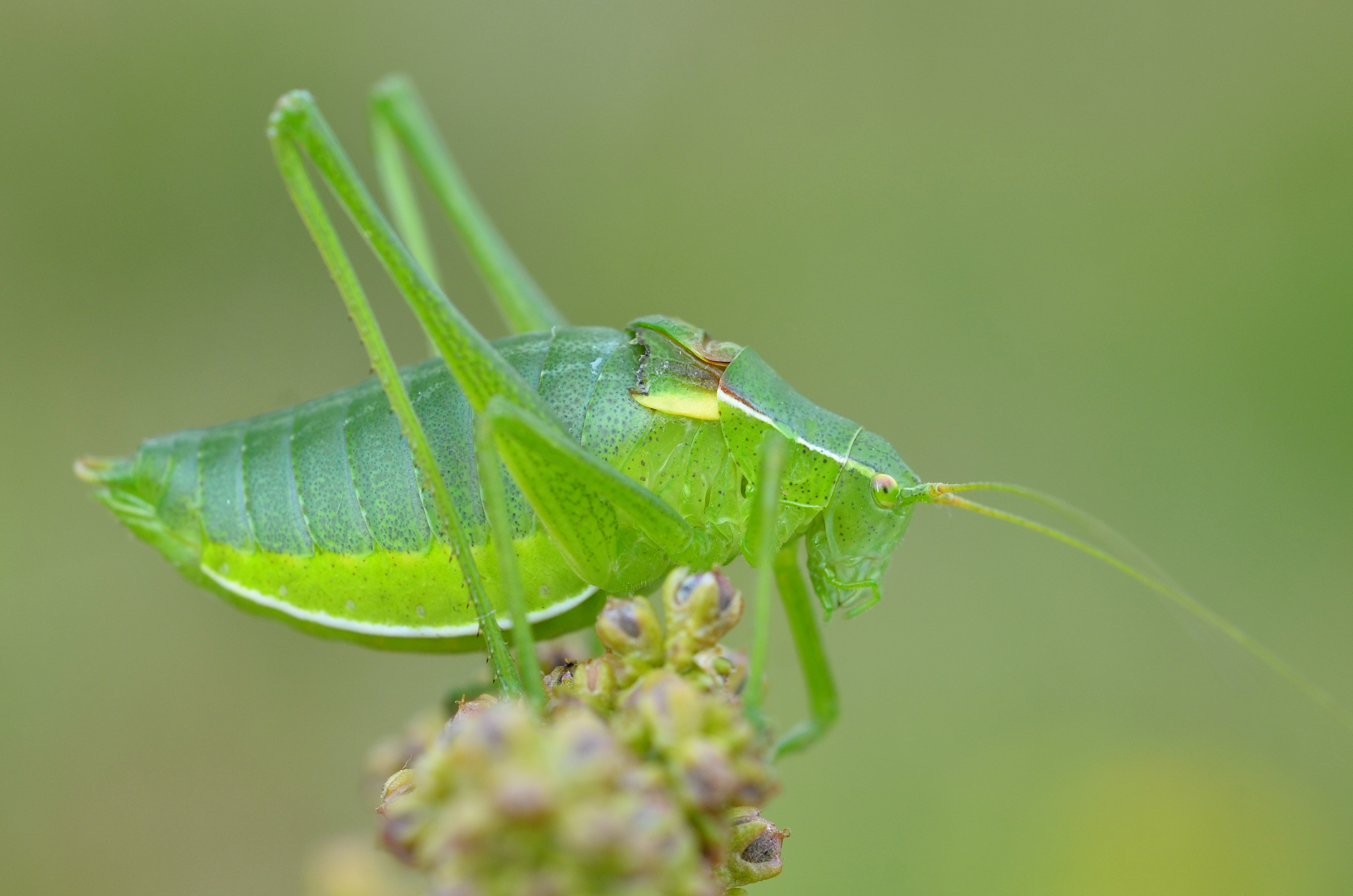
- Male Isophya pyrenaea

Scientific classification
- Kingdom: Animalia
- Phylum: Arthropoda
- Clade: Pancrustacea
- Class: Insecta
- Order: Orthoptera
- Suborder: Ensifera
- Family: Tettigoniidae
- Subfamily: Phaneropterinae; Burmeister, 1838

Synonyms
- Phaneropteridae Burmeister, 1838 (see nomenclature)

= Phaneropterinae =

Subfamily of cricket-like animals

The Phaneropterinae, the sickle-bearing bush crickets or leaf katydids, are a subfamily of insects within the family Tettigoniidae. They may also be known as "false katydids" (to distinguish them from the "true katydids") or "round-headed katydids".

The name Phaneropterinae is based upon the Old World genus Phaneroptera (type species P. falcata), meaning "visible wing"; this refers to the exposed tips of the inner wings seen in many species, although some genera, notably in the tribes Barbitistini and Odonturini, have become brachypterous.

== Description ==
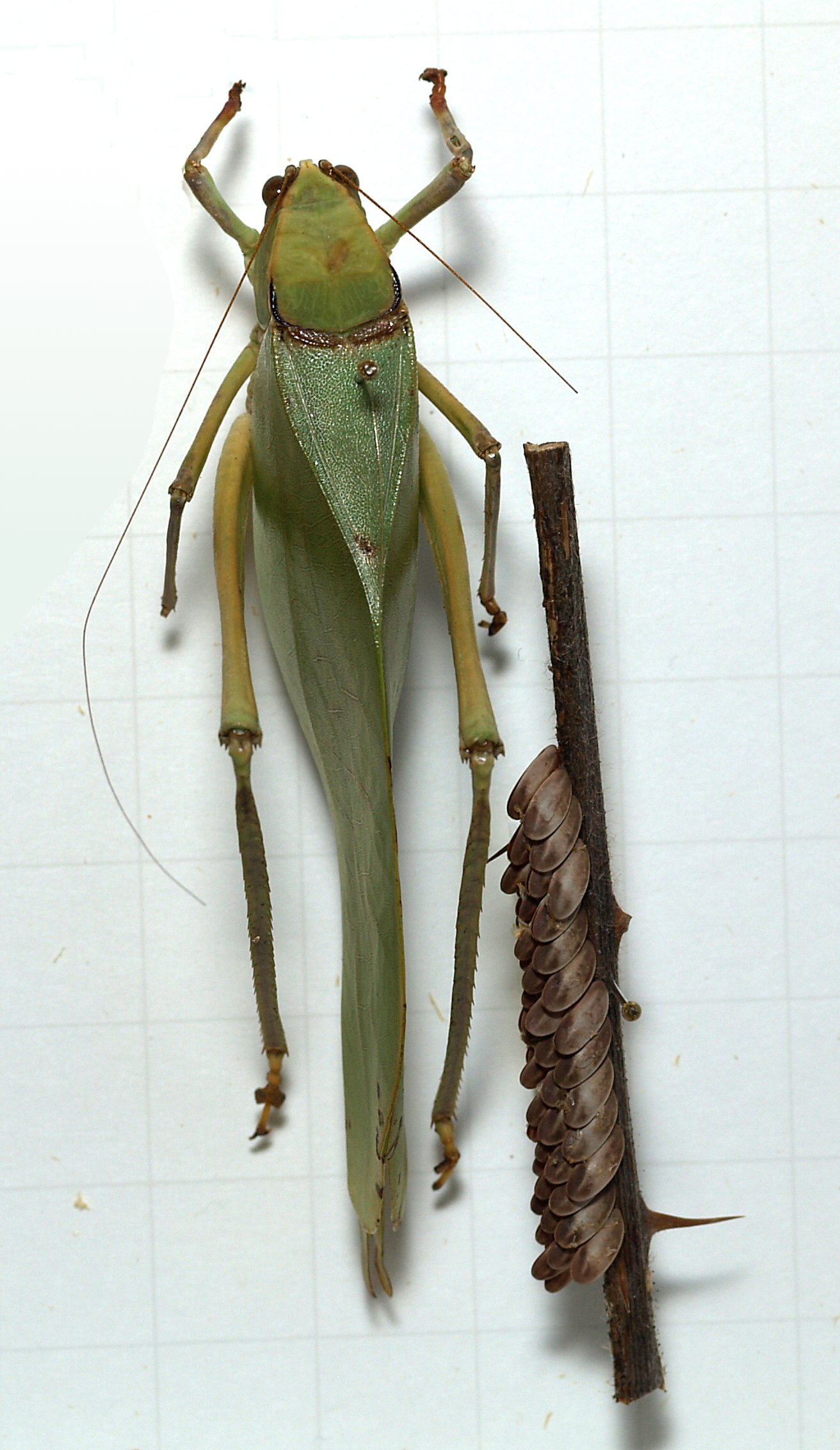
Adult Phaneropterinae species with eggs

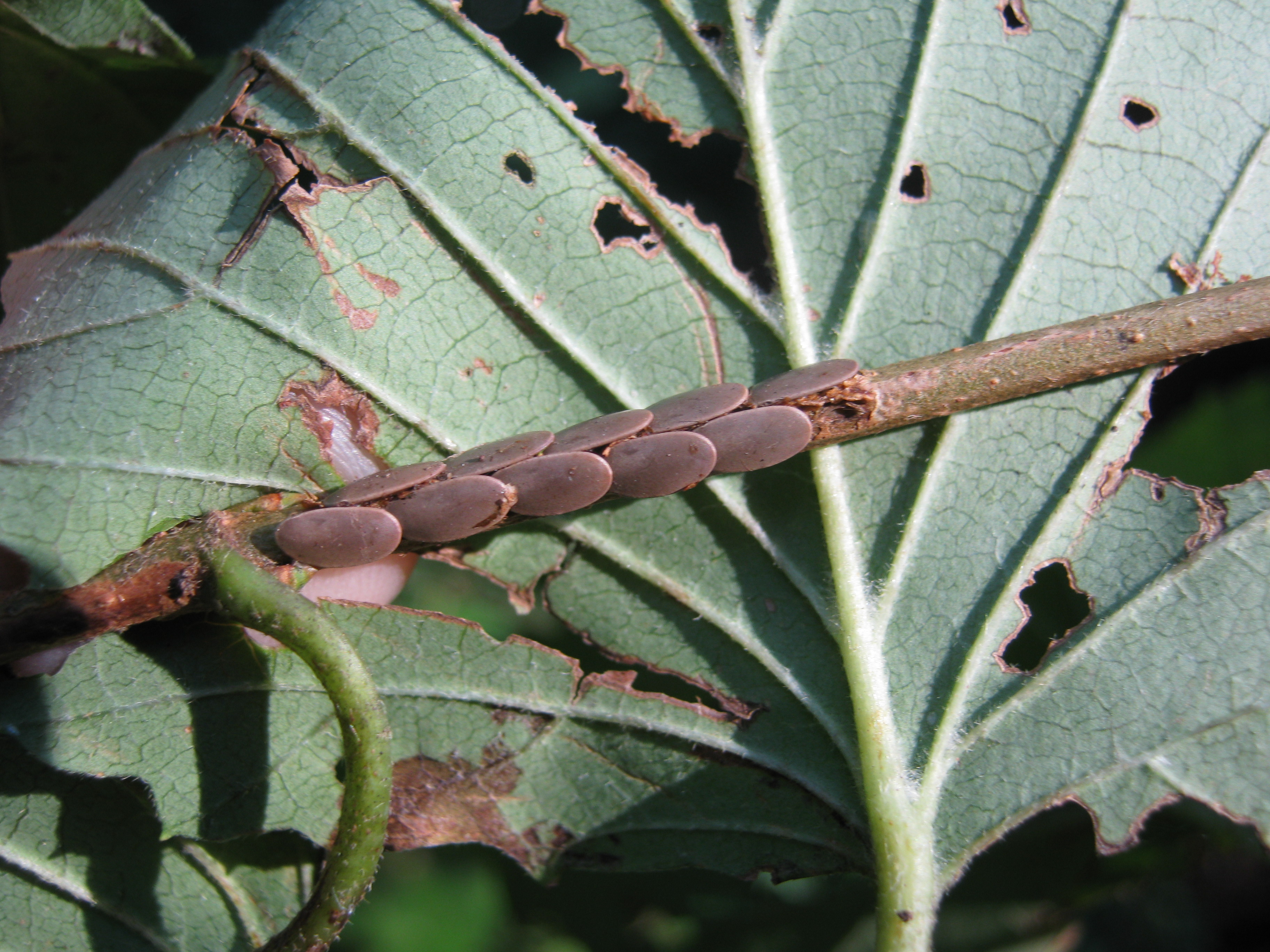
Eggs of Microcentrum

The legs of individuals in this subfamily vary by genus, but as in nearly all Orthoptera, the posterior (rear) legs are adapted to leaping, and as such are always much longer than other legs. Phaneropterinae are generally well-camouflaged with green and brown colors being most prevalent, but some exceptions include certain Aganacris and Scaphura species that are Batesian mimics of wasps.

The Phaneropterinae are largely arboreal in habitat. The vast majority of species lives in shrubs and trees, feeding on leaves and twigs. Some species might potentially cause significant damage, though usually superficial, when present in large numbers, but this is rare; they usually are solitary, unlike meadow grasshoppers, so much so that they seldom come to human notice.

The ovipositor and male genitalia vary according to the genus. The Phaneropterinae differ from other subfamilies of Tettigoniidae (and other Orthoptera) in their oviposition; their eggs are rarely deposited in the earth, but are either glued in double rows to twigs, or are inserted in the edges of leaves.

== Nomenclature ==
The subfamily Phaneropterinae was first erected in 1838 by German zoologist Hermann Burmeister as "Phaneropteridae"; long treated as a synonym, the Orthoptera Species File (OSF) now places the Phaneropteridae as a supersubfamily, together with the similar subfamilies Mecopodinae, Phyllophorinae, and Pseudophyllinae.

== Taxonomy ==
As of August 2026, OSF lists these tribes and genera, including a number of tribes elevated from subtribes and genus groups:

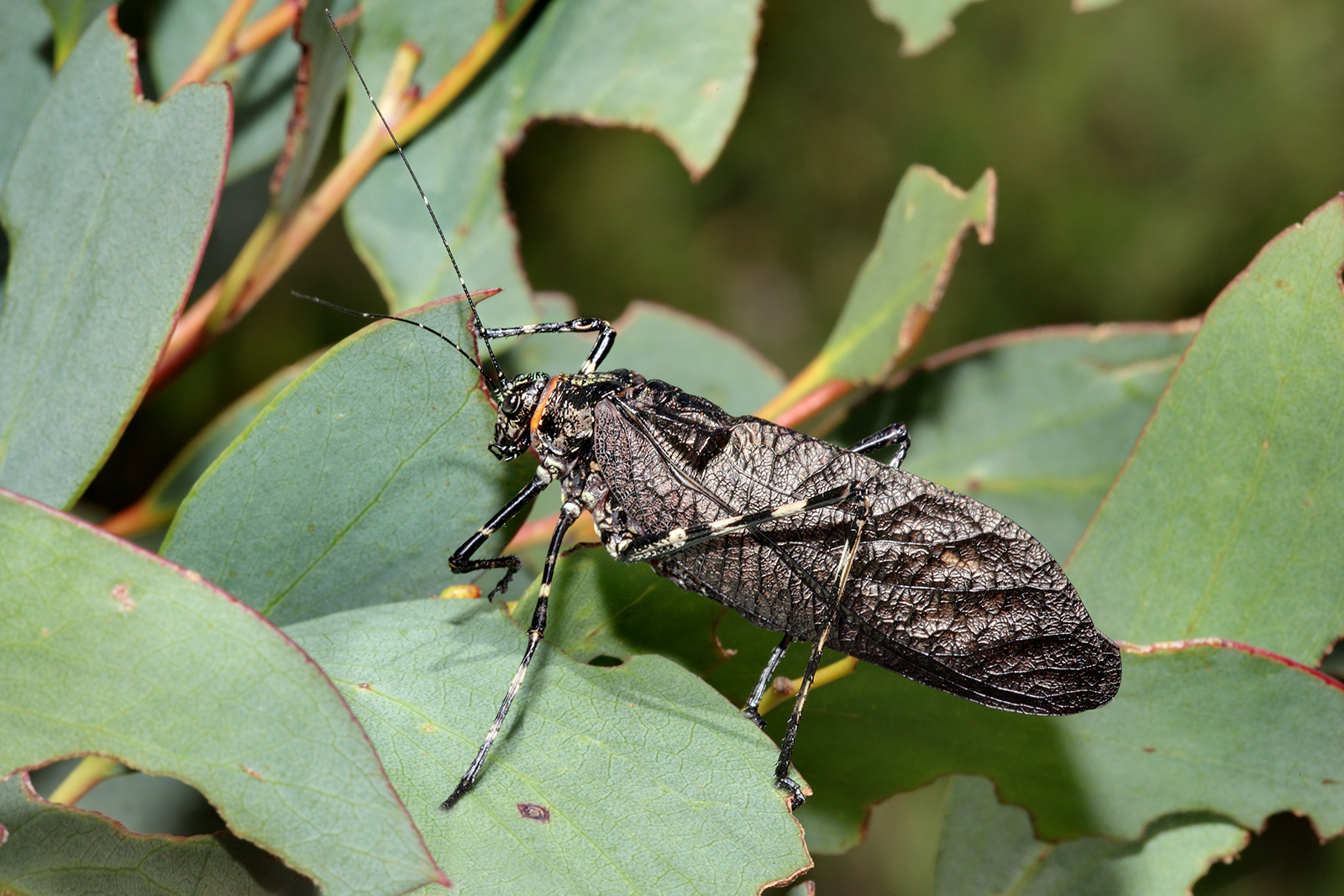
Male Acripeza reticulata

Acripezini Brunner von Wattenwyl, 1878 – Australia

1. Acripeza Guérin-Méneville, 1832
2. Ozphyllum Rentz, Su & Ueshima, 2007

=== Acrometopini ===
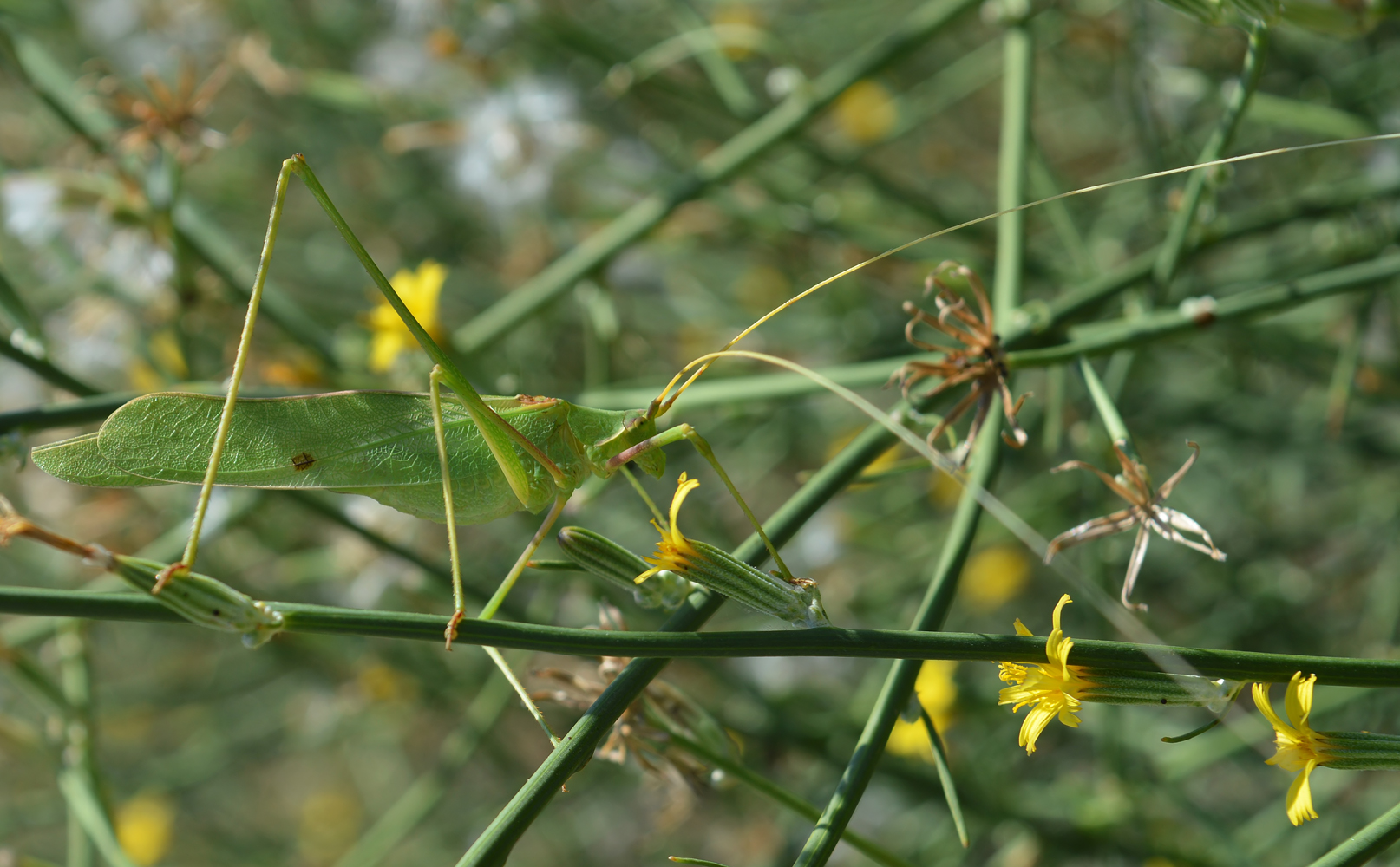
Acrometopa servillea

Auth.: Brunner von Wattenwyl, 1878 – Africa, Europe, the Middle East

1. Acrometopa Fieber, 1853
2. Altihoratosphaga Hemp, Voje, Heller, Warchalowska-Sliwa & Hemp, 2010
3. Conchotopoda Karsch, 1887
4. Horatosphaga Schaum, 1853
5. Lamecosoma Ragge, 1960
6. Peronura Karsch, 1889
7. Peronurella Hemp, 2018
8. Prosphaga Ragge, 1960
9. Tenerasphaga Hemp, 2018

Aegimiini Brunner von Wattenwyl, 1878 – Central and South America

1. Aegimia Stål, 1874

=== Amblycoryphini ===
Auth.: Brunner von Wattenwyl, 1878 (synonym Amblycoryphae) – Americas, Africa

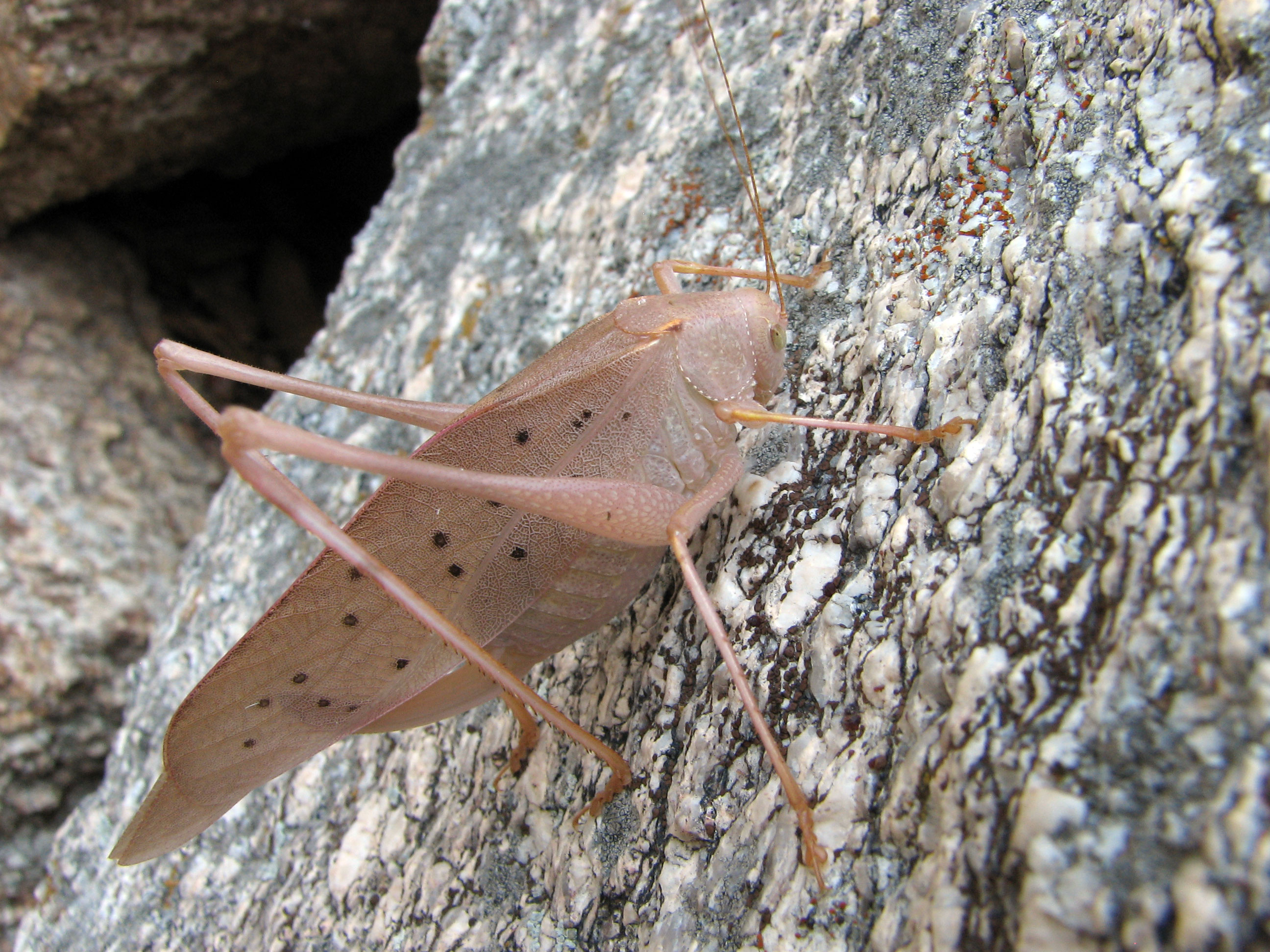
Amblycorypha insolita

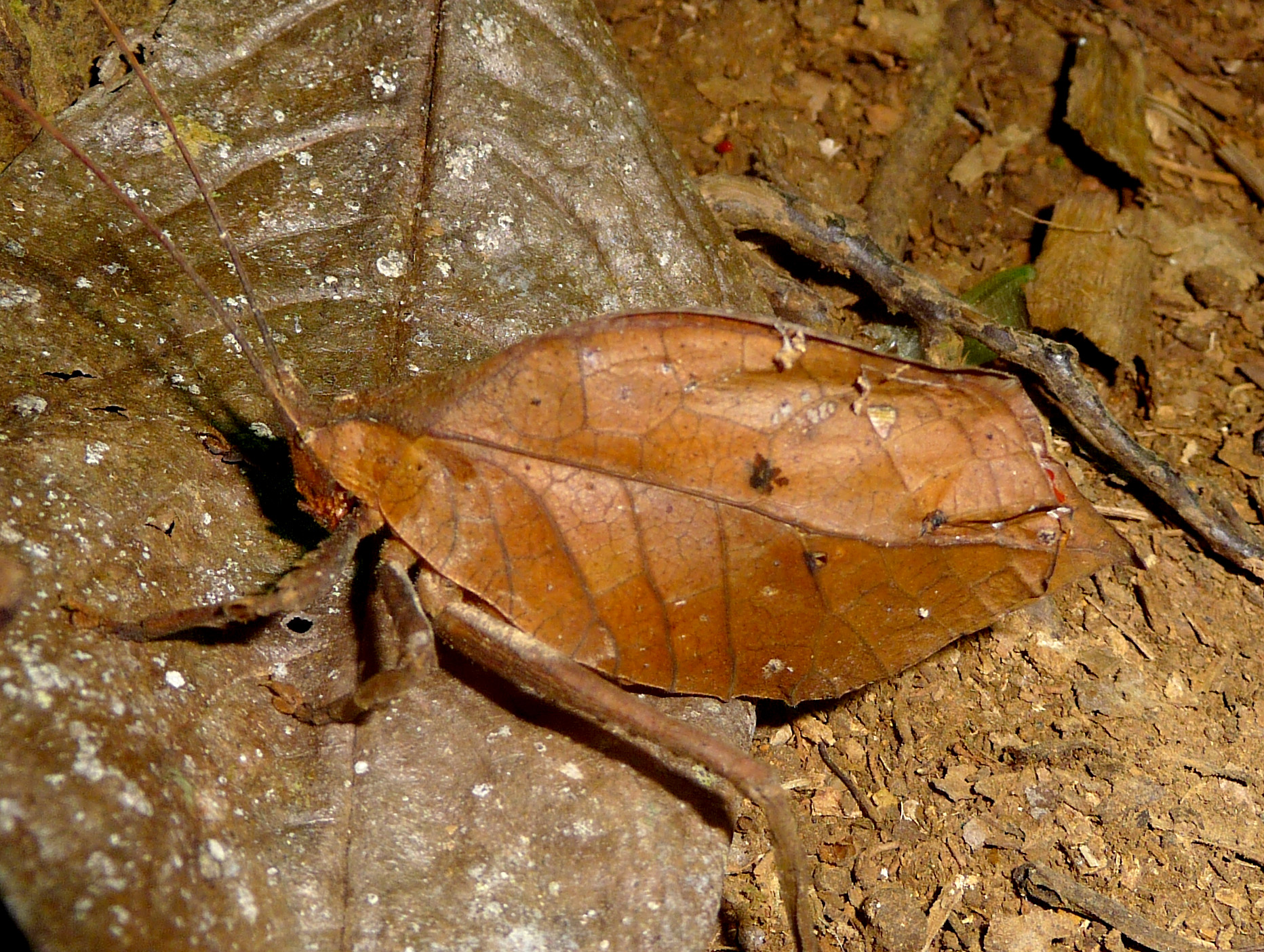
Orophus tessellatus

- Subtribe Plangiina Cadena-Castañeda, 2015
1. Madagascarantia Massa, 2017
2. Monteiroa Karsch, 1889
3. Paraplangia Heller, 2018
4. Plangia Stål, 1873
5. Pseudoplangia Massa, 2014
- Subtribe not assigned
1. Agaurella Uvarov, 1939
2. Amblycorypha Stål, 1873
3. Eurycoplangiodes Massa, 2020
4. Eurycorypha Stål, 1873
5. Orophus Saussure, 1859
6. Oxygonatium Ragge, 1980
7. Paraeurycorypha Massa, 2020
8. Plangiodes Chopard, 1954

=== Anaulacomerini ===
Authority: Brunner von Wattenwyl, 1878 – Central and South America

1. Abrodiaeta Brunner von Wattenwyl, 1891
2. Anaulacomera Stål, 1873
3. Grammadera Brunner von Wattenwyl, 1878
4. Mendesius Piza, 1960
5. Montealegrezia Cadena-Castañeda, 2012
6. Pelecynotum Piza, 1967
7. Phaneropteroides Piza, 1971
8. Polichnodes Giglio-Tos, 1898
9. Rostellula Gorochov, 2018
10. Separatula Gorochov, 2018
11. Tenellulus Cadena-Castañeda, 2012
12. Tomeophera Brunner von Wattenwyl, 1878
13. Viadana Walker, 1869 (incorporates Ctenophlebia Stål, 1873)

Aniarellini Brunner von Wattenwyl, 1878 – South America

- subtribe Aniarellina Brunner von Wattenwyl, 1878
1. Aniarella Bolívar, 1906
2. Buzzettium Cadena-Castañeda, 2026
3. Engonia Brunner von Wattenwyl, 1878
4. Euxenica Bruner, 1915
5. Pseudoburgilis Brunner von Wattenwyl, 1878
6. Xenicola Uvarov, 1940
- subtribe Hyperophorina Cadena-Castañeda, 2026
1. Burgilis Stål, 1873
2. Coryphoda Brunner von Wattenwyl, 1878
3. Hyperophora Brunner von Wattenwyl, 1878
4. Pseudoburgilis Brunner von Wattenwyl, 1878
- Tetanina Cadena-Castañeda, 2026
1. Tetana Brunner von Wattenwyl, 1878

=== Anisophyini ===
Auth.: Cadena-Castañeda, 2026; distribution S. America

- subtribe Angarina Cadena-Castañeda, 2026
1. Angara Brunner von Wattenwyl, 1891
2. Nanoleptopoda Braun, 2011
3. Parangara Rehn, 1945
- subtribe Anisophyina Cadena-Castañeda, 2026
1. Anisophya Karabag, 1960
2. Caimanellus Battiston & Fontana, 2024
3. Cohnia Buzzetti, Fontana & Carotti, 2010
4. Hellerium Cadena-Castañeda, 2026
5. Lorieriella Cadena-Castañeda, 2026

=== Barbitistini ===
Auth.: Jacobson, 1905 – Europe to central Asia

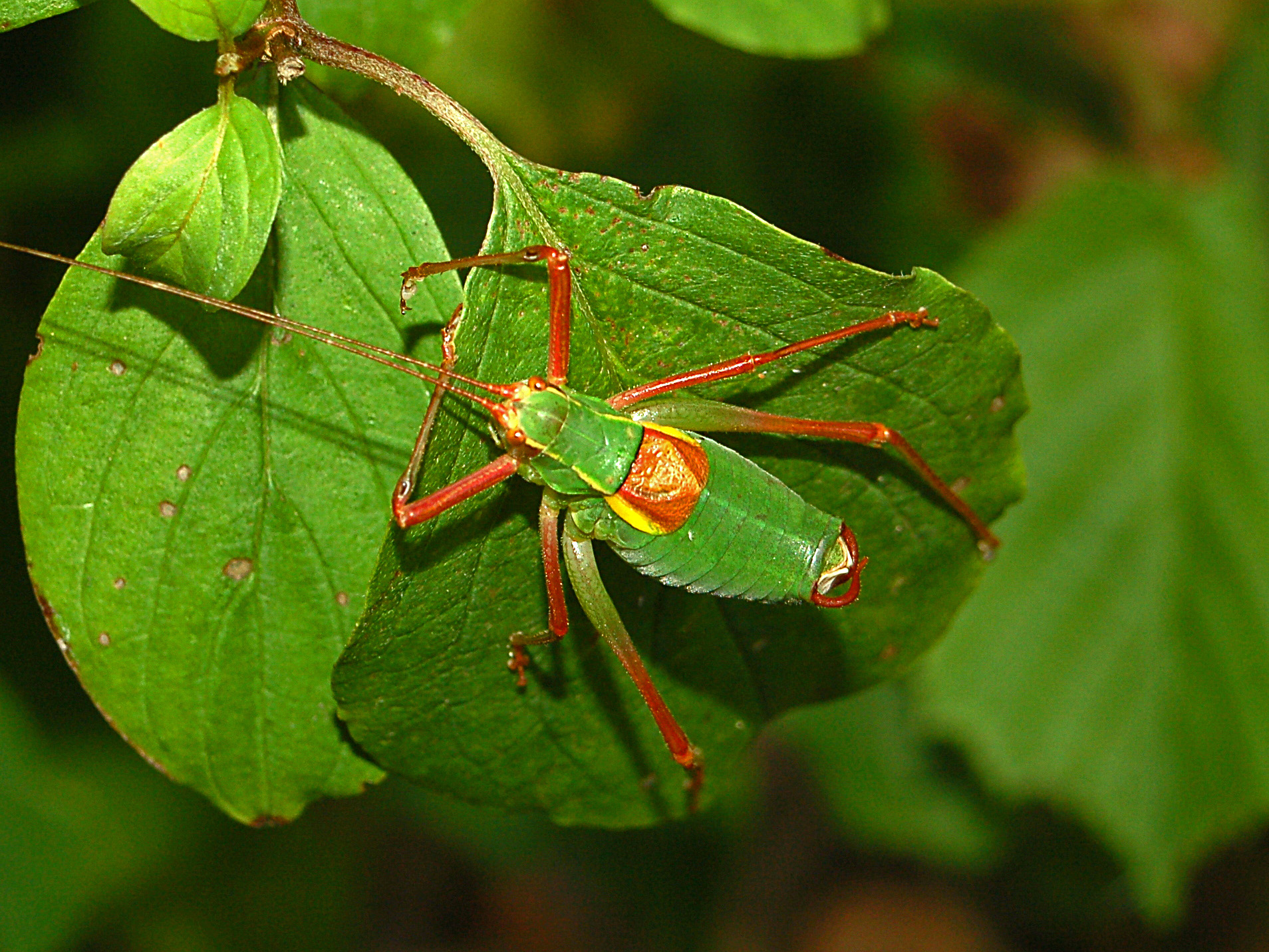
Male Barbitistes obtusus

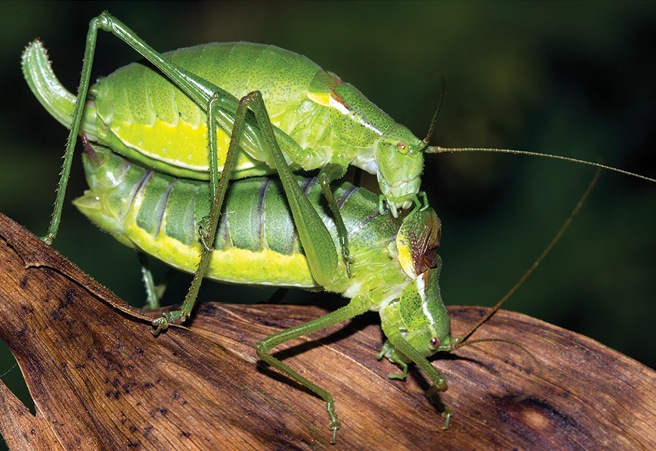
Isophya species mating

1. Ancistrura Uvarov, 1921 - monotypic Ancistrura nigrovittata (Brunner von Wattenwyl, 1878)
2. Andreiniimon Capra, 1937 - monotypic Andreiniimon nuptialis (Karny, 1918)
3. Barbitistes Charpentier, 1825
4. Dasycercodes Bei-Bienko, 1951 - monotypic Dasycercodes iranicus Bey-Bienko, 1951
5. Euconocercus Bei-Bienko, 1950
6. Isoimon Bei-Bienko, 1954 - monotypic Isoimon riabovi (Uvarov, 1927)
7. Isophya Brunner von Wattenwyl, 1878
8. Kurdia Uvarov, 1916
9. Leptophyes Fieber, 1853
10. Metaplastes Ramme, 1939
11. Orthocercodes Bei-Bienko, 1951 - monotypic Orthocercodes zarudnyi (Uvarov, 1930)
12. Phonochorion Uvarov, 1916
13. Poecilimon Fischer, 1853
14. Polysarcus Fieber, 1853

=== Catoptropterigini ===
Auth.: Massa, 2016 – Africa

1. Catoptropteryx Karsch, 1890
2. Griffinipteryx Massa, 2016

Centroferini Brunner von Wattenwyl, 1878 – South America

1. Centrofera Brunner von Wattenwyl, 1878

Cosmophyllini Brunner von Wattenwyl, 1878 – South America, Madagascar, Australia

1. Cosmophyllum Blanchard, 1851
2. Engonia Brunner von Wattenwyl, 1878
3. Marenestha Brunner von Wattenwyl, 1878
4. Ozphyllum Rentz, Su & Ueshima, 2007
5. Paracosmophyllum Brunner von Wattenwyl, 1891
6. Stenophyllia Brunner von Wattenwyl, 1878

=== Dichopetalini ===
Auth.: Cadena-Castañeda, 2026 - North & central America

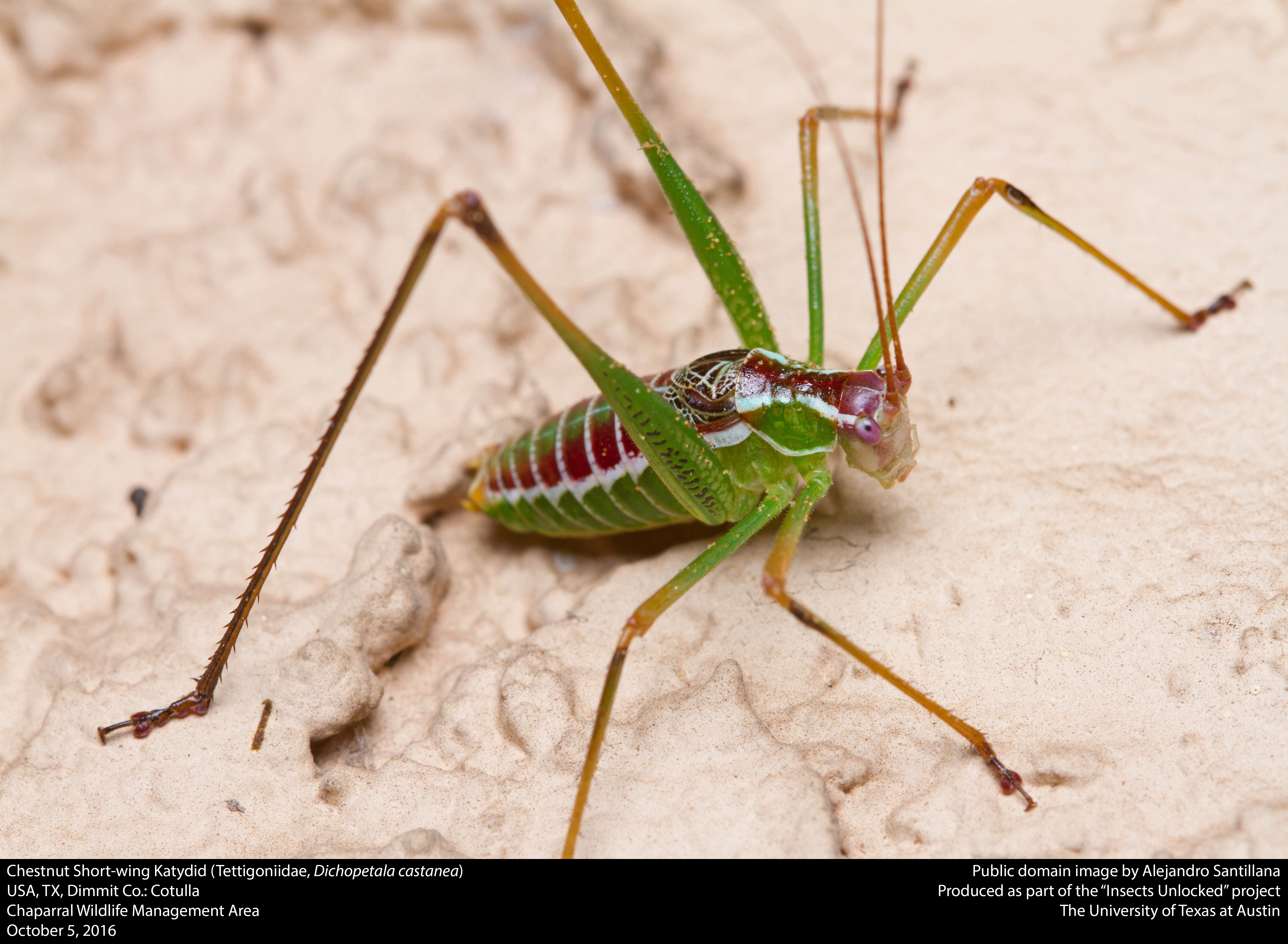
Obolopteryx castanea

1. Acanthorintes Cohn, Swanson & Fontana, 2014
2. Arachnitus Hebard, 1932
3. Dichopetala Brunner von Wattenwyl, 1878
4. Gymnocerca Cohn, Swanson & Fontana, 2014
5. Mactruchus Cohn, Swanson & Fontana, 2014
6. Maxium Cadena-Castañeda, 2026
7. Obolopteryx Cohn, Swanson & Fontana, 2014
8. Planipollex Cohn, Swanson & Fontana, 2014
9. Pterodichopetala Buzzetti, Barrientos-Lozano & Rocha-Sánchez, 2010
10. Rhabdocerca Cohn, Swanson & Fontana, 2014
11. Tedcohnia Cadena-Castañeda, 2026

=== Ducetiini ===
Auth.: Brunner von Wattenwyl, 1878 (now incorporating Elimaeini Brunner von Wattenwyl, 1891) – Africa, India, China, Indochina to Australia

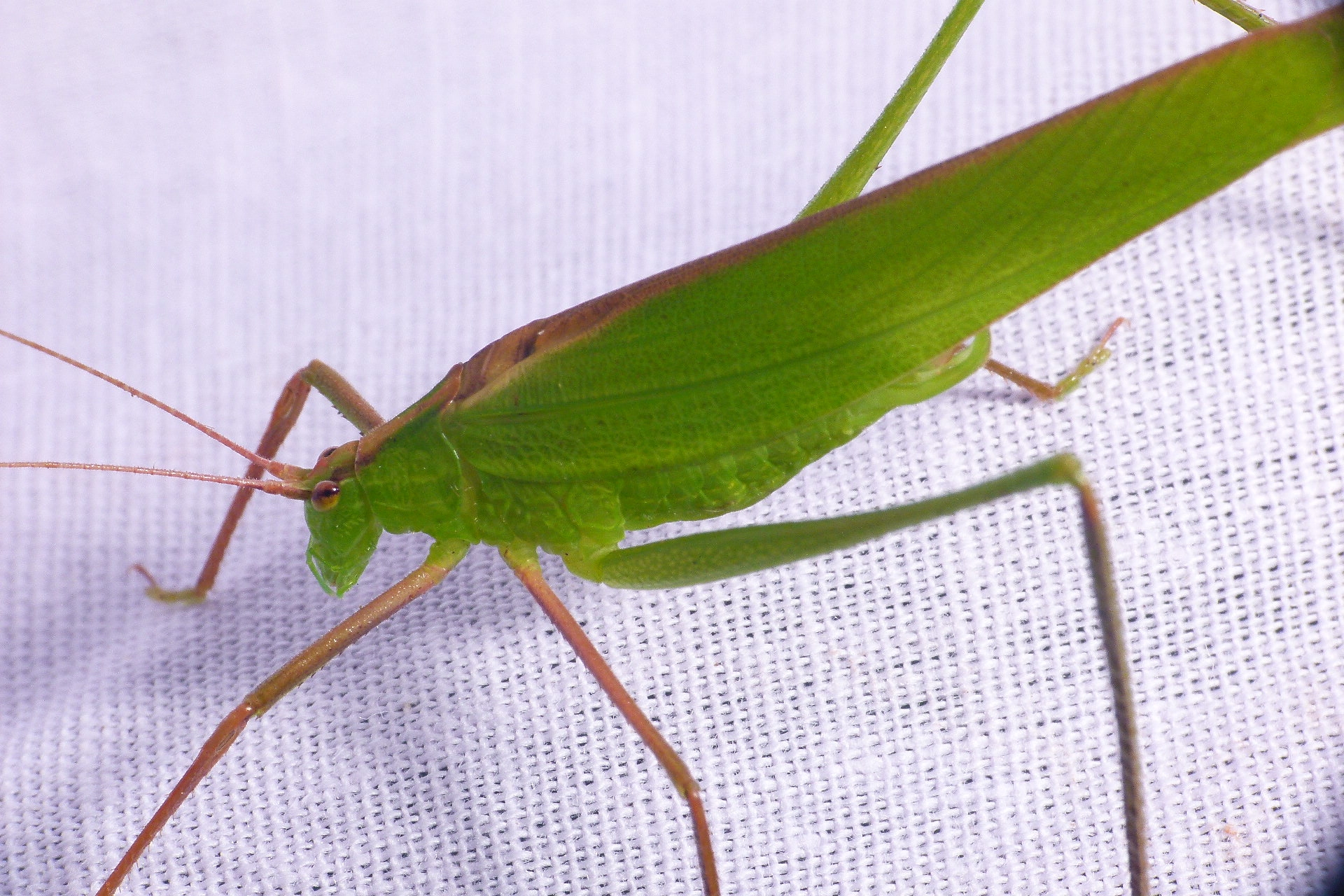
Ducetia sp.

1. Abaxisotima Gorochov, 2005
2. Agnapha Brunner von Wattenwyl, 1891
3. Bulbistridulous Xia & Liu, 1991
4. Ducetia Stål, 1874
5. Ectadia Brunner von Wattenwyl, 1878
6. Elimaea Stål, 1874
7. Kuwayamaea Matsumura & Shiraki, 1908
8. Noia Walker, 1870
9. Orthelimaea Karny, 1926
10. Paraducetia Gorochov & Kang, 2002
11. Paragnapha Willemse, 1923
12. Prohimerta Hebard, 1922
13. Shirakisotima Furukawa, 1963
14. Subibulbistridulous Shi, 2002

=== Dysoniini ===
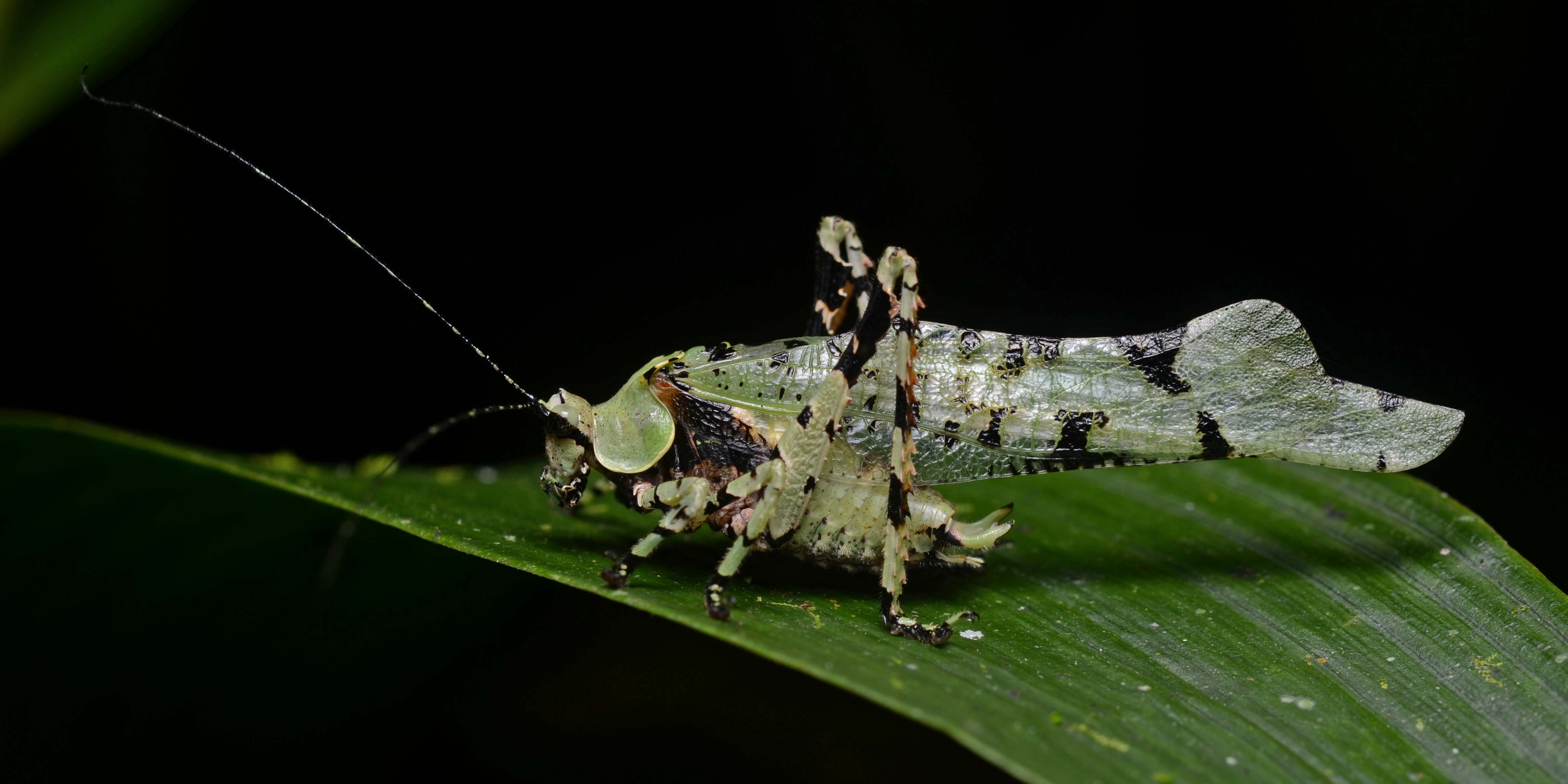
Dysonia sp.

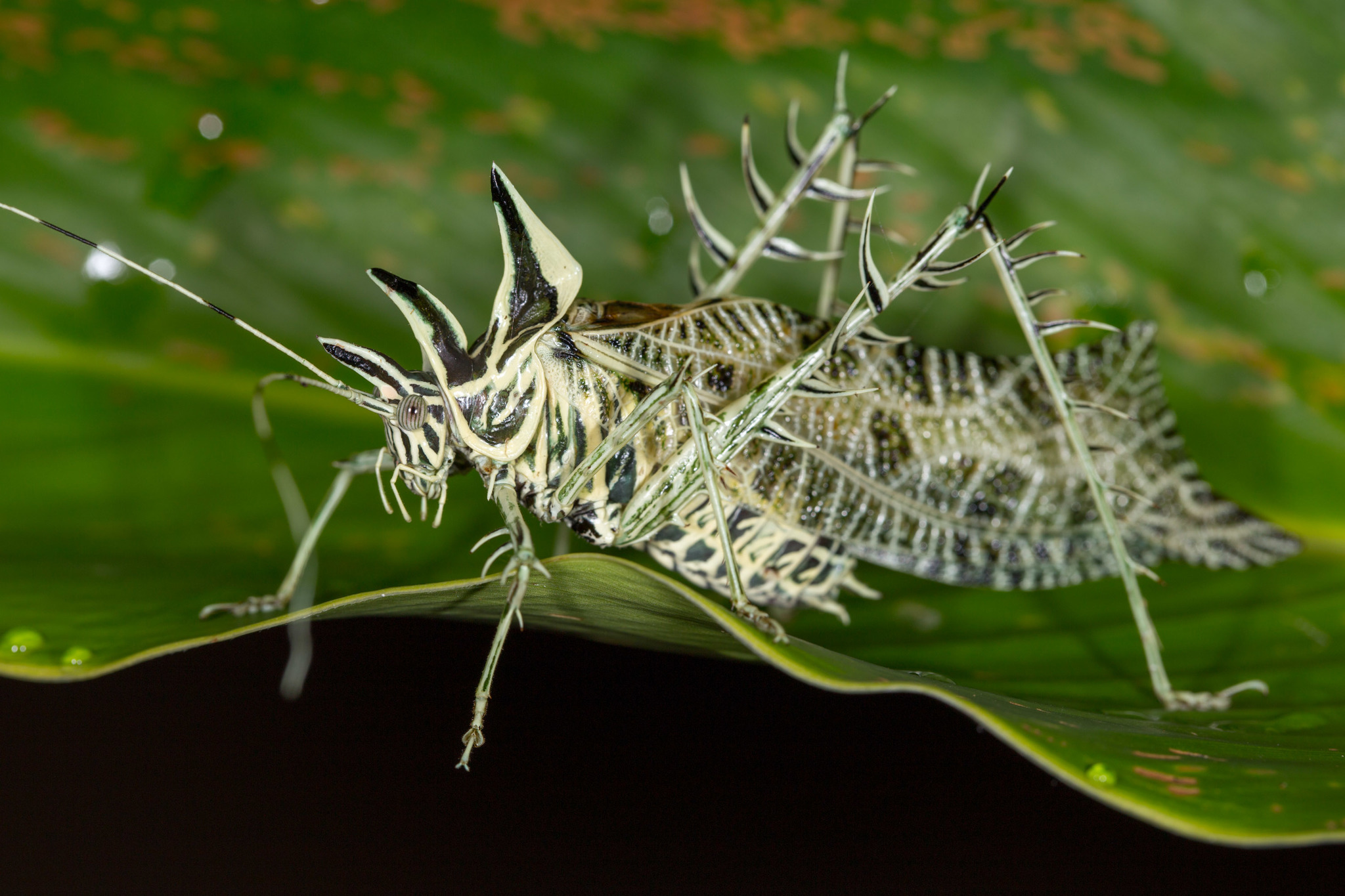
Markia arizae

Auth.: Rehn, 1950 – tropical Americas

- Genus group Dysonia (temporary)
  - Dysonia White, 1862
  - Lichenodentix Cadena-Castañeda, 2011
  - Lichenomorphus Cadena-Castañeda, 2011
- Genus group Markia Cadena-Castañeda, 2013
  - Apolinaria Rehn, 1950
  - Lichenodraculus Braun, 2011
  - Machima Brunner von Wattenwyl, 1878
  - Machimoides Rehn, 1950
  - Markia White, 1862
- Genus group Paraphidniae Cadena-Castañeda, 2016
  - Anaphidna Gorochov & Cadena-Castañeda, 2012
  - Paraphidnia Giglio-Tos, 1898
- Genus group not assigned
- Hammatofera Brunner von Wattenwyl, 1878
- Quiva Hebard, 1927
- Yungasacris Rehn, 1950

Dysmorphini Brunner von Wattenwyl, 1878 – Malesia

1. Dysmorpha Brunner von Wattenwyl, 1878

=== Ectemnini ===
Auth.: Cadena-Castañeda, 2015 – tropical Americas

1. Ectemna Brunner von Wattenwyl, 1878
2. Euthyrrhachis Brunner von Wattenwyl, 1878

=== Ephippitythini ===
Auth.: Brunner von Wattenwyl, 1878; distribution: mostly the Australasian realm, Vietnam

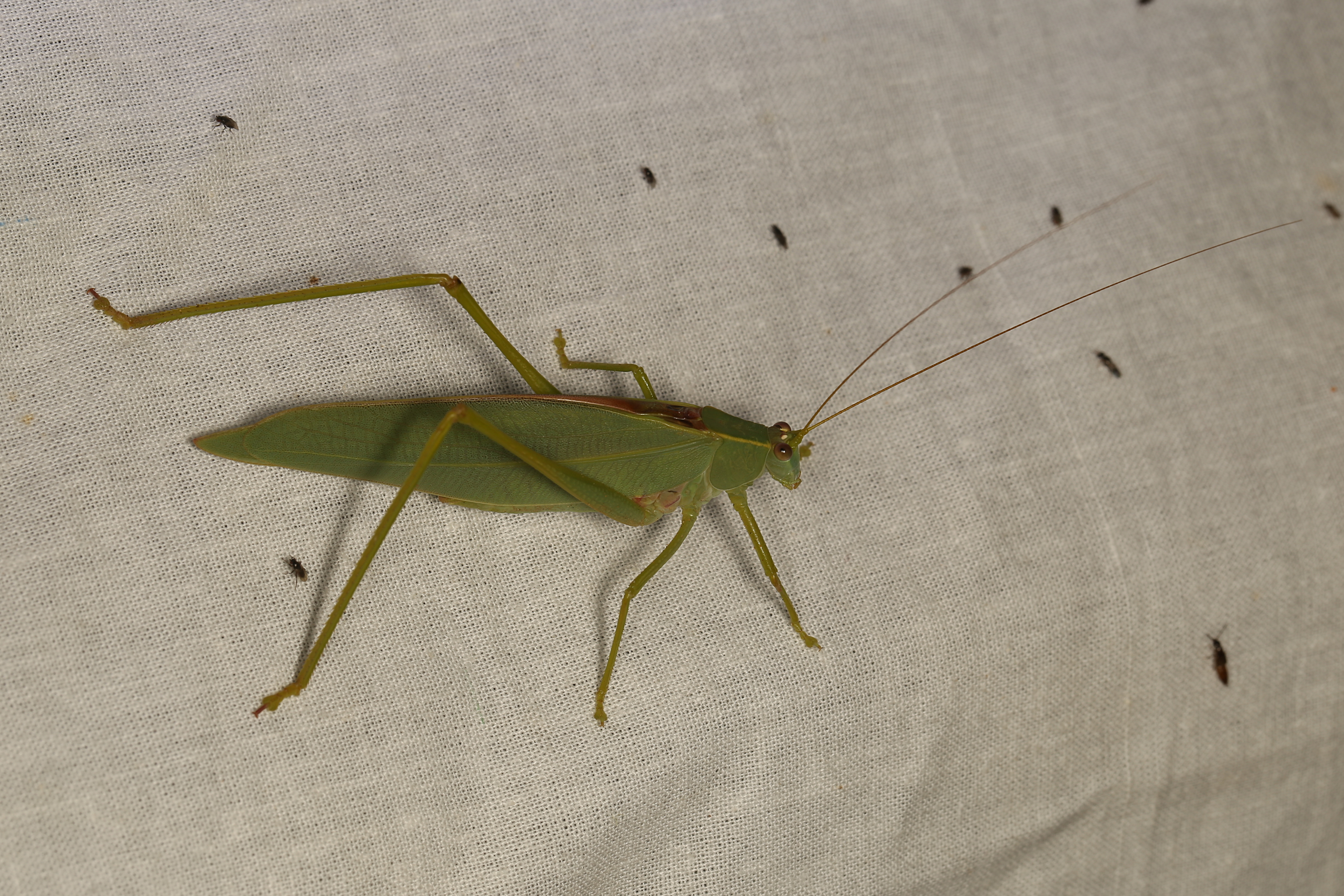
Caedicia simplex

1. Alectoria superba in monotypic Alectoria Brunner von Wattenwyl, 1879
2. Caedicia Stål, 1874
3. Currimundria Rentz, Su & Ueshima, 2008
4. Diastella Brunner von Wattenwyl, 1878
5. Dicorypha Krauss, 1902
6. Ephippitytha Serville, 1838
7. Kurandoptera Rentz, Su & Ueshima, 2008
8. Polichne Stål, 1874
9. Protina Brunner von Wattenwyl, 1879
10. Symmachis Brunner von Wattenwyl, 1878
11. Torbia Walker, 1869

=== Eurypalpini ===
Authority: Brunner von Wattenwyl, 1878; distribution: Eastern China, Vietnam, Sumatra, Australia

1. Ceratopompa Karsch, 1890
2. Zulpha Walker, 1870

=== Holochlorini ===
Auth.: Brunner von Wattenwyl, 1878 – Africa, Asia-Pacific

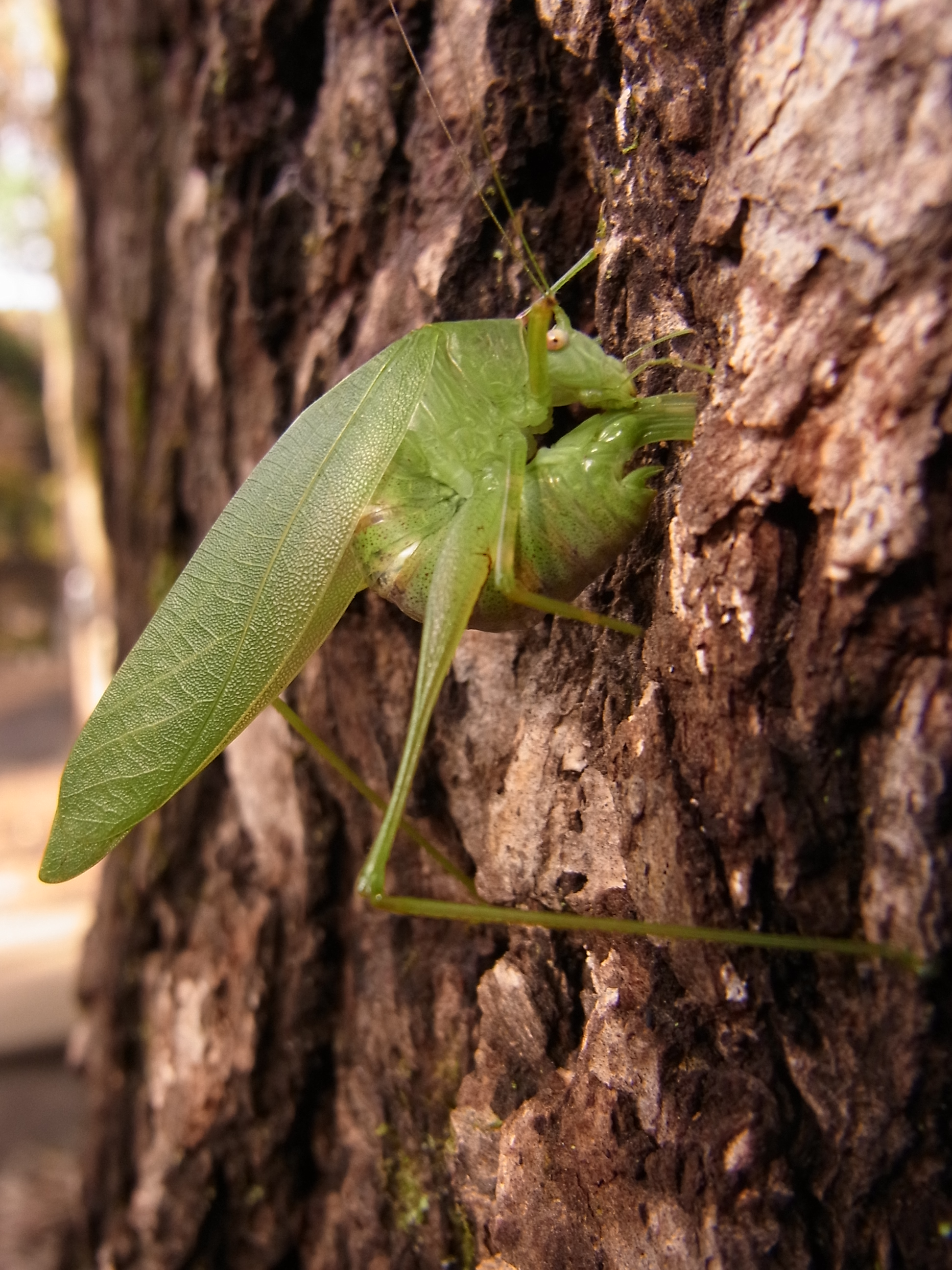
Holochlora japonica female laying eggs

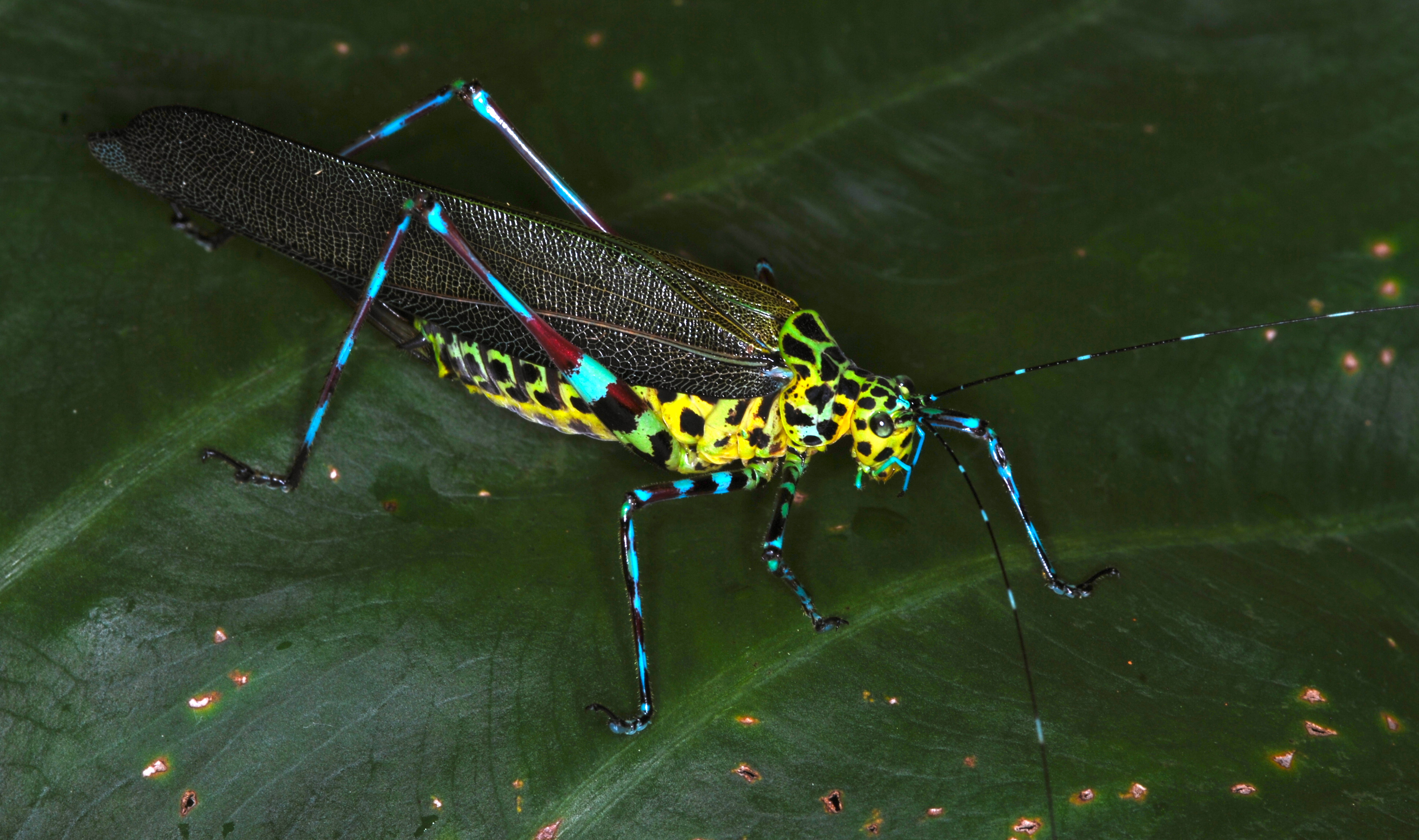
Poecilopsyra octoseriata

1. Ancylecha Serville, 1838
2. Arantia Stål, 1874
3. Arnobia Stål, 1876
4. Calopsyra Brunner von Wattenwyl, 1891 (includes subgenus Parapsyra Carl, 1914)
5. Casigneta Brunner von Wattenwyl, 1878
6. Cesasundana Koçak & Kemal, 2009
7. Dapanera Karsch, 1889
8. Elbenia Stål, 1876: includes subgenus Tamdaopteron Gorochov, 2005
9. Furnia Stål, 1876
10. Gonatoxia Karsch, 1889
11. Holochlora Stål, 1873
12. Leucopodoptera Rentz & Webber, 2003
13. Liotrachela Brunner von Wattenwyl, 1878
14. Molpa Walker, 1870
15. Phaulula Bolívar, 1906
16. Phygela Stål, 1876
17. Poecilopsyra Dohrn, 1892
18. Pseudopsyra Hebard, 1922
19. Psyrana Uvarov, 1940
20. Pulchrapsyra Tan, Liu & Ingrisch, 2024
21. Rectimarginalis Liu & Kang, 2007
22. Ruidocollaris Liu, 1993
23. Sinochlora Tinkham, 1945
24. Stibaroptera Bolívar, 1906
25. Stictophaula Hebard, 1922
26. Sympaestria Brunner von Wattenwyl, 1878
27. Tapiena Bolívar, 1906

=== Insarini ===
Auth.: Rehn, & Hebard, 1914 – tropical & subtropical Americas

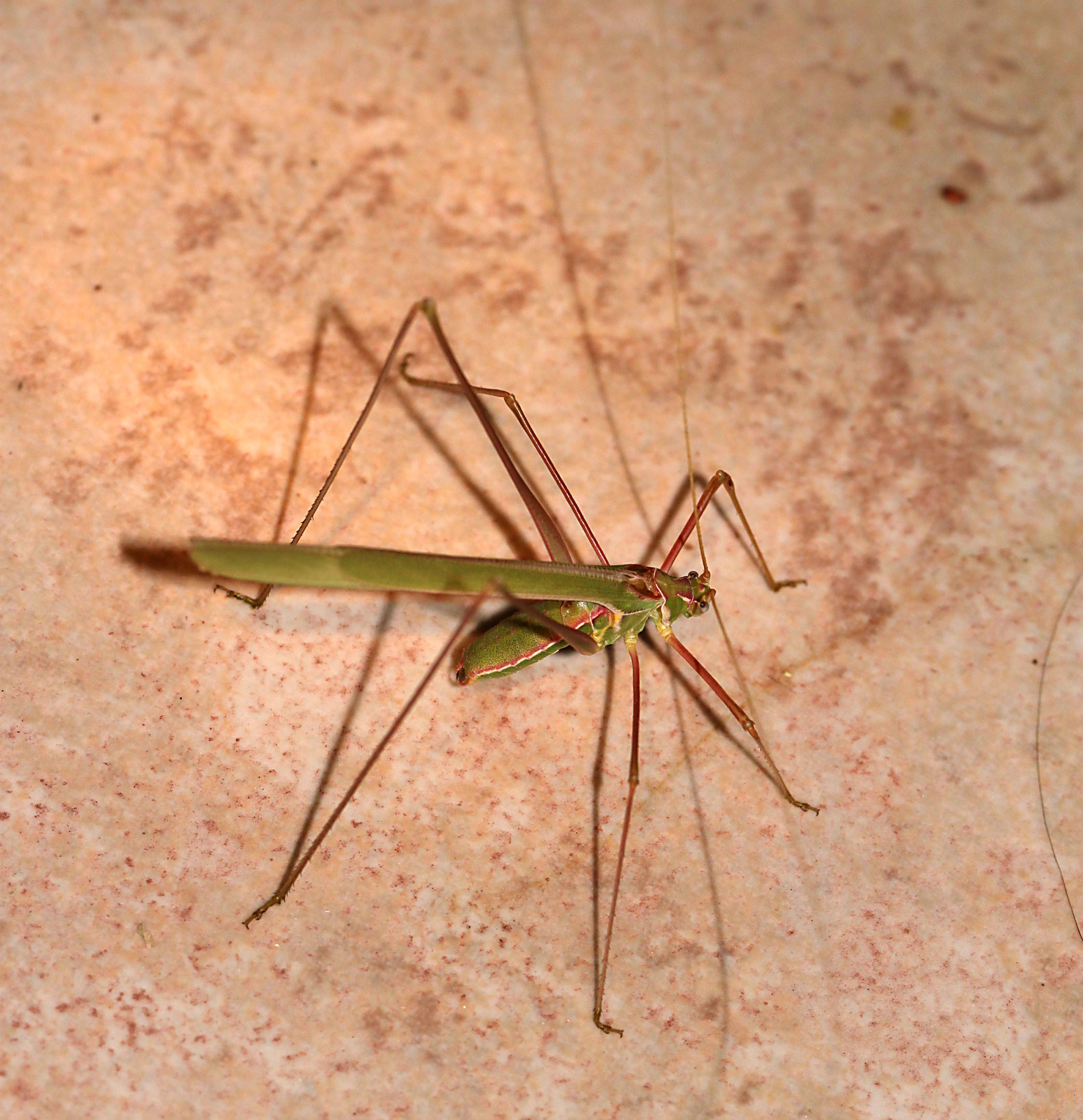
Arethaea sp.

1. Arethaea Stål, 1876
2. Brachyinsara Rehn & Hebard, 1914
3. Insara Walker, 1869
4. Montezumina Hebard, 1925
5. Psilinsara Hebard, 1932

Isopserini Brunner von Wattenwyl, 1878 – Eastern Africa, India, Indochina, Malesia

1. Isopsera Brunner von Wattenwyl, 1878
2. Pelerinus Bolívar, 1906
3. Pseudopyrrhizia Brunner von Wattenwyl, 1891

=== Kevaniellini ===
Auth.: Massa, 2017 – eastern Africa

1. Kevaniella Chopard, 1954

=== Letanini ===
Auth.: Hebard, 1922 – Asia

1. Himertula Uvarov, 1940
2. Letana Walker, 1869

Leptoderini Brunner von Wattenwyl, 1878 – Sri Lanka, Malesia

1. Leptoderes Serville, 1838

=== Mirolliini ===
Auth.: Brunner von Wattenwyl, 1878 – Asia

1. Amirollia Ingrisch, 2011
2. Deflorita Bolívar, 1906
3. Hemielimaea Brunner von Wattenwyl, 1878
4. Hemimirollia Ingrisch, 2011
5. Hueikaeana Ingrisch, 1998
6. Mirollia Stål, 1873

Monticolariini Cadena-Castañeda, 2026 - Central & E. Africa

1. Arostratum Massa, 2015
2. Atlasacris Rehn, 1914
3. Hempia Cadena-Castañeda, 2026
4. Massaium Cadena-Castañeda, 2026
5. Monticolaria Sjöstedt, 1910
6. Odonturoides Ragge, 1980
7. Peropyrrhicia Brunner von Wattenwyl, 1891

=== Morgeniini ===
Auth.: Karsch, 1890 - central and western Africa

1. Mangomaloba Sjöstedt, 1902
2. Morgenia Karsch, 1890

=== Odonturini ===
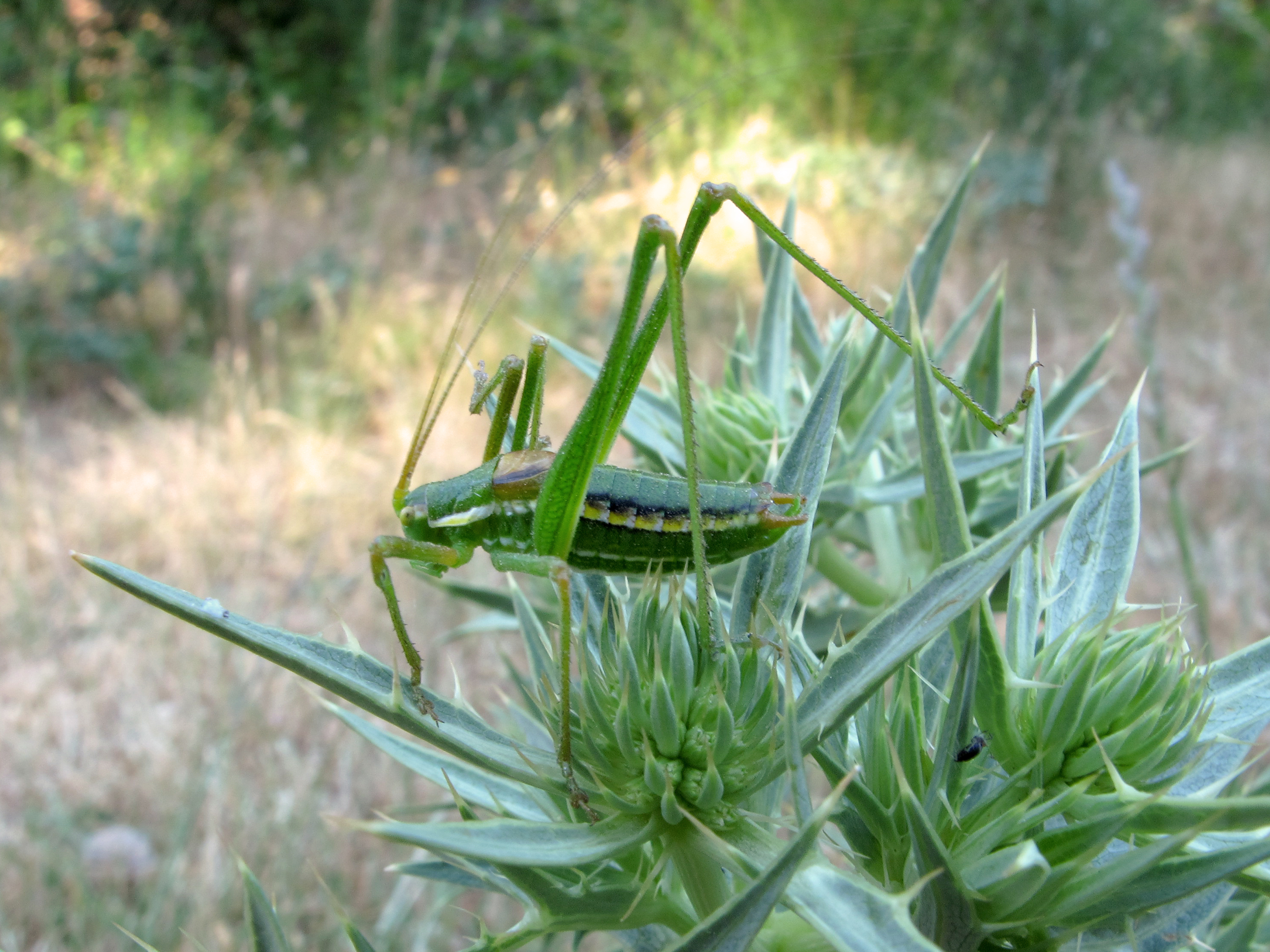
Odonturella macphersoni

Auth.: Brunner von Wattenwyl, 1878 – Iberian peninsula, North Africa

1. Odontura Rambur, 1838
2. Odonturella Bolívar, 1900

=== Otiaphysini ===
Auth.: Karsch, 1889 - Africa

1. Debrona Walker, 1870 (synonym Otiaphysa Karsch, 1889)
2. Drepanophyllum Karsch, 1890 (synonym Karschia Brunner von Wattenwyl, 1891)
3. Stenamblyphyllum Karsch, 1896
4. Tetraconcha Karsch, 1890

=== Pardalotini ===
Auth.: Brunner von Wattenwyl, 1878 - Africa

1. Pardalota Brunner von Wattenwyl, 1878
2. Poecilogramma Karsch, 1887

=== Percynini ===
Auth.: Cadena-Castañeda, 2015 – South America

1. Percyna Grant, 1964
2. Sictuna Walker, 1869

=== Phaneropterini ===
Auth.: Burmeister, 1838 – most continents, especially Africa

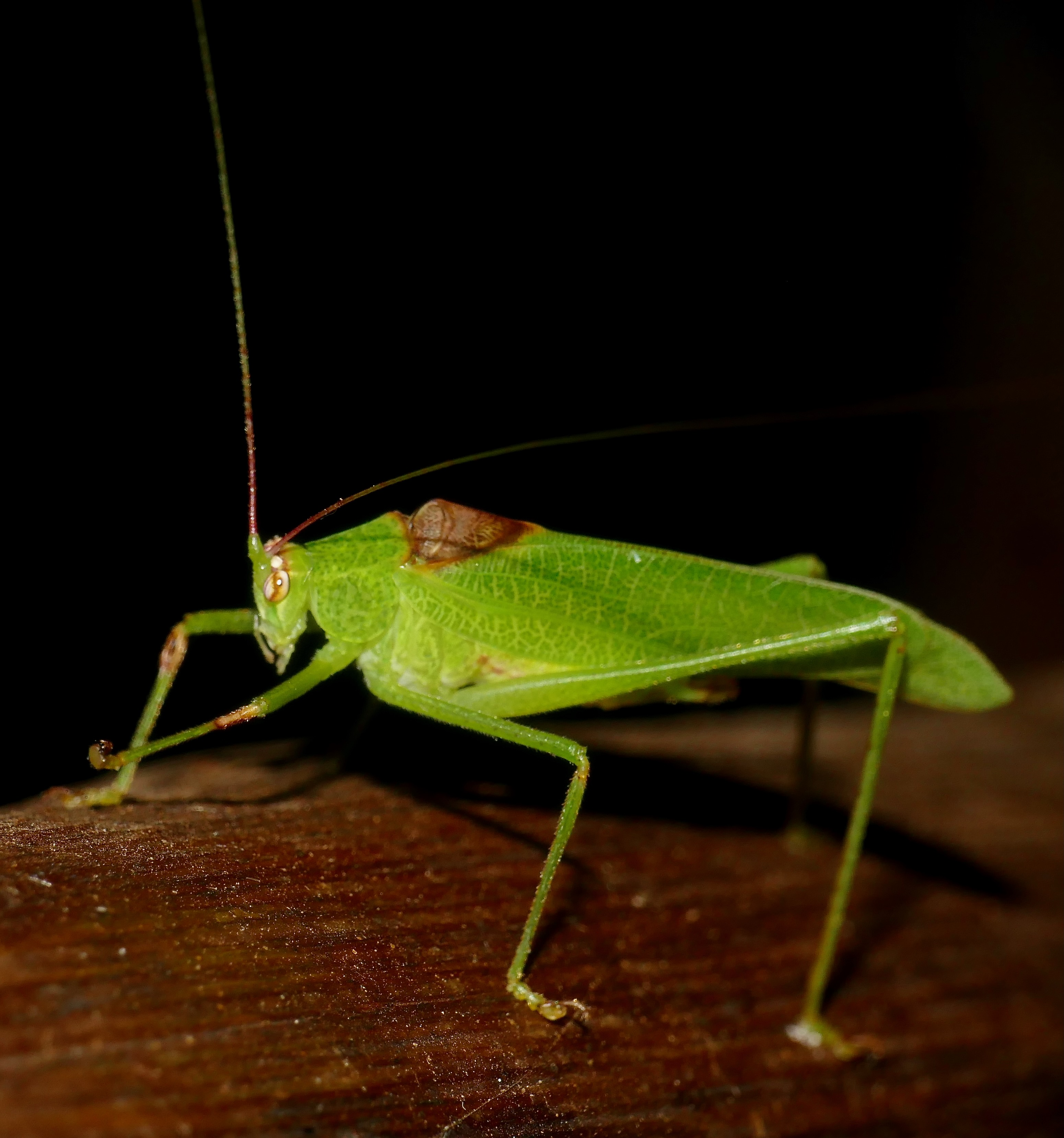
Melidia brunneri

1. Agennis Brunner von Wattenwyl, 1891 - Madagascar
2. Dannfeltia Sjöstedt, 1902
3. Dioncomena Brunner von Wattenwyl, 1878
4. Dithela Karsch, 1890
5. Eucatopta Karsch, 1889
6. Eulioptera Ragge, 1956
7. Kefalia Hemp, 2019
8. Melidia Stål, 1876 - Africa
9. Nephoptera Uvarov, 1929
10. Paraeulioptera Massa, 2020
11. Parapyrrhicia Brunner von Wattenwyl, 1891
12. Phaneroptera Serville, 1831
13. Phanreticula Massa, 2025
14. Pigalua Massa, 2017
15. Pleothrix Ragge, 1980
16. Polichne Stål, 1874 - Australasia
17. Symmetrokarschia Massa, 2015
18. Symmetroraggea Massa, 2015
19. Xenodoxus Carl, 1914

=== Phlaurocentrini ===
Auth.: Karsch, 1889 – Africa

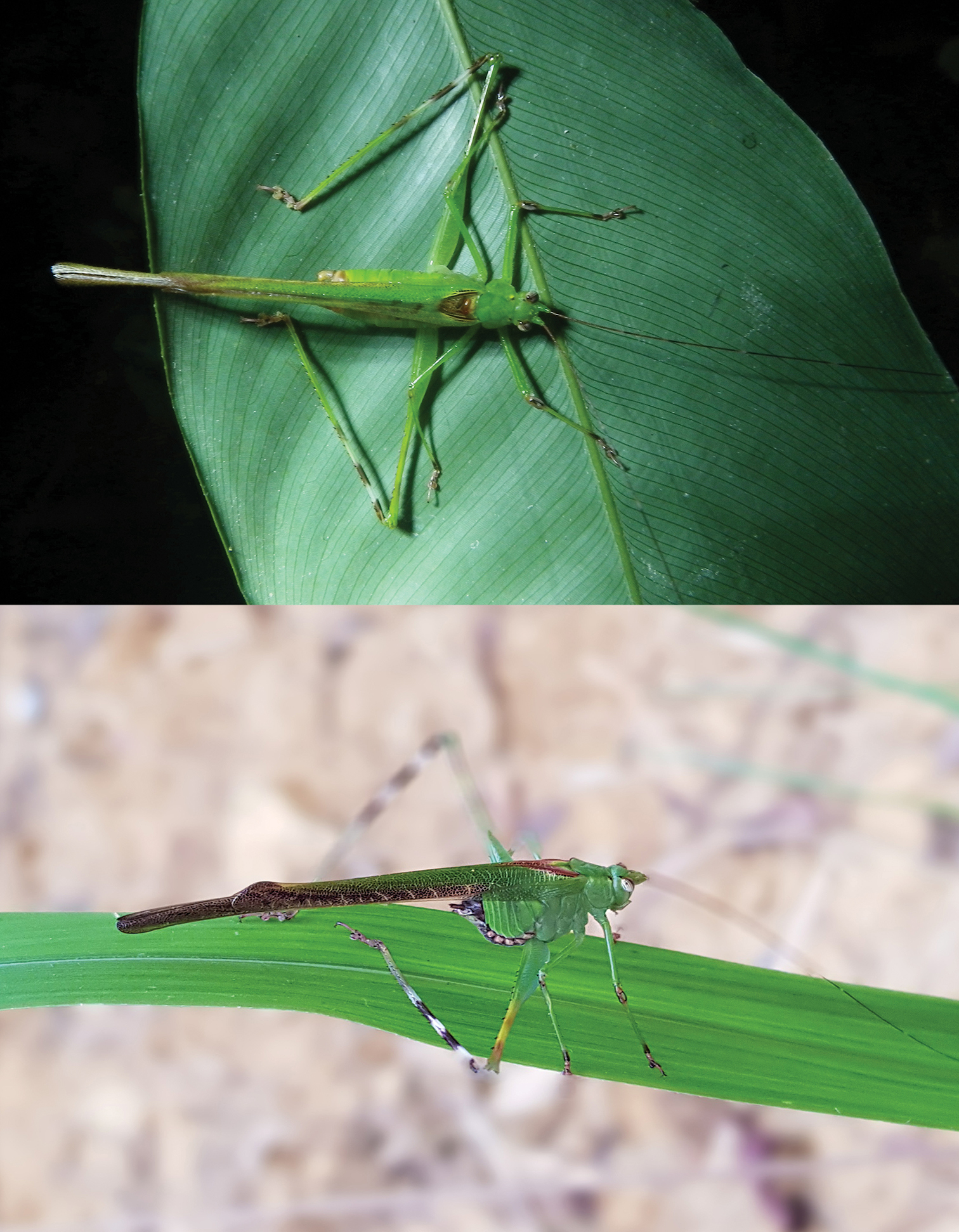
Leiodontocercus condylus

1. Buettneria Karsch, 1889
2. Leiodontocercus Chopard, 1954
3. Phlaurocentrum Karsch, 1889

=== Phyllopterini ===
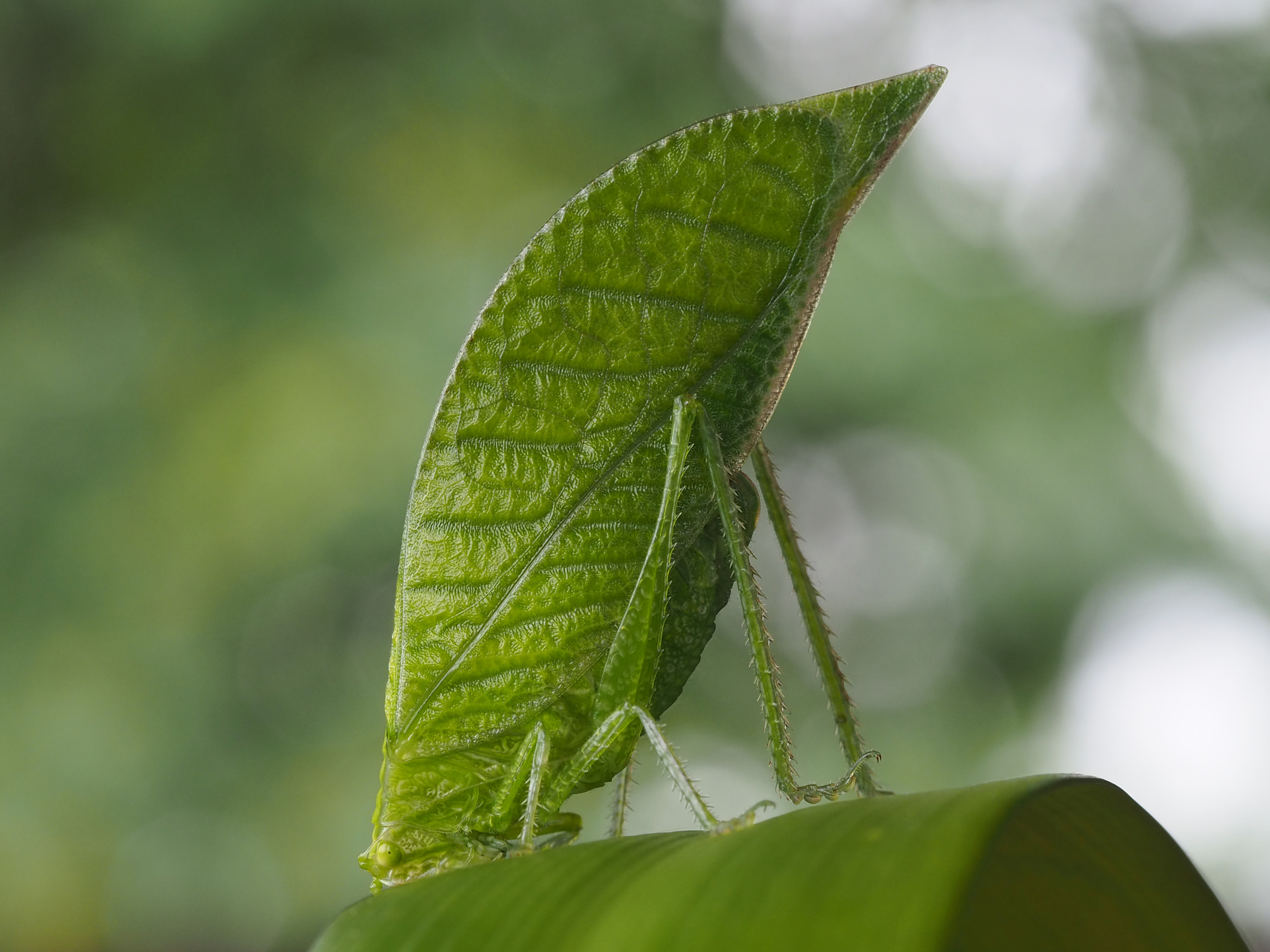
Female Resecabimus aratus

Auth.: Brunner von Wattenwyl, 1878

- Phyllopterina Brunner von Wattenwyl, 1878 – Central and South America
1. Apocerycta Brunner von Wattenwyl, 1878
2. Arota Brunner von Wattenwyl, 1891
3. Cephalophylloptera Cadena-Castañeda, 2015
4. Hyperphrona Brunner von Wattenwyl, 1878
5. Hyperphorina Cadena-Castañeda, 2015
6. Itarissa Walker, 1869
7. Julchiella Cadena-Castañeda, 2015
8. Meneghelia Piza, 1980
9. Metaprosagoga Vignon, 1930
10. Phrixa Stål, 1874
11. Phylloptera Serville, 1831
12. Resecabimus Cadena-Castañeda, 2015
- Uberabina Cadena-Castañeda, 2015 – South America
1. Polichnodes Giglio-Tos, 1898
2. Uberaba Bruner, 1915

=== Plagiopleurini ===
Auth.: Brunner von Wattenwyl, 1878 – South America

1. Diplophyllus Saussure, 1859
2. Parableta Brunner von Wattenwyl, 1878
3. Plagiopleura Stål, 1873

=== Plangiopsidini ===
Auth.: Cadena-Castañeda, 2015 – Africa

1. Plangiola Bolívar, 1906
2. Plangiopsis Karsch, 1889

=== Poreuomenini ===
Auth.: Brunner von Wattenwyl, 1878 – Africa

1. Cestromoecha Karsch, 1893
2. Paraporeuomena Massa, 2018
3. Poreuomena Brunner von Wattenwyl, 1878

=== Preussiini ===
Auth.: Karsch, 1890 – Africa

1. Enochletica Karsch, 1896
2. Preussia Karsch, 1890
3. Weissenbornia Karsch, 1888

Pseudophaneropterini Brunner von Wattenwyl, 1878

1. Pseudophaneroptera Brunner von Wattenwyl, 1878 - Sri Lanka, Sumatra

=== Pycnopalpini ===
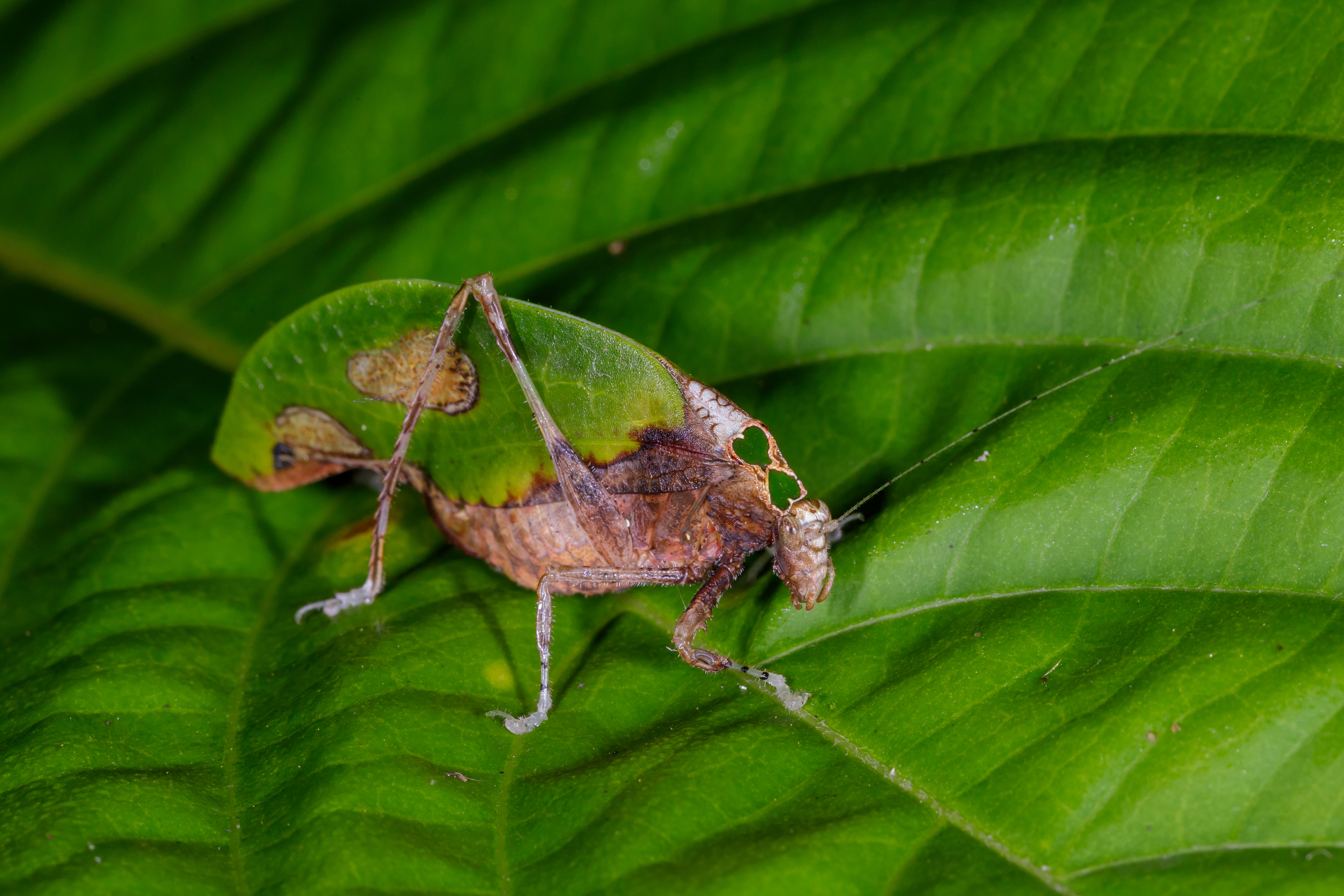
Pycnopalpa bicordata

Auth.: Cadena-Castañeda, 2014 – Central and South America

- Pycnopalpina Cadena-Castañeda, 2014
1. Hetaira Brunner von Wattenwyl, 1891
2. Pycnopalpa Serville, 1838
3. Topanga Walker, 1869
- Theiina Cadena-Castañeda, 2014
1. Dolichocercus Rehn & Hebard, 1914
2. Oxyprorella Giglio-Tos, 1898
3. Theia Brunner von Wattenwyl, 1891
4. Theiella Cadena-Castañeda, 2014

Scambophyllini Brunner von Wattenwyl, 1878 – Indochina, Malesia

1. Scambophyllum Brunner von Wattenwyl, 1878

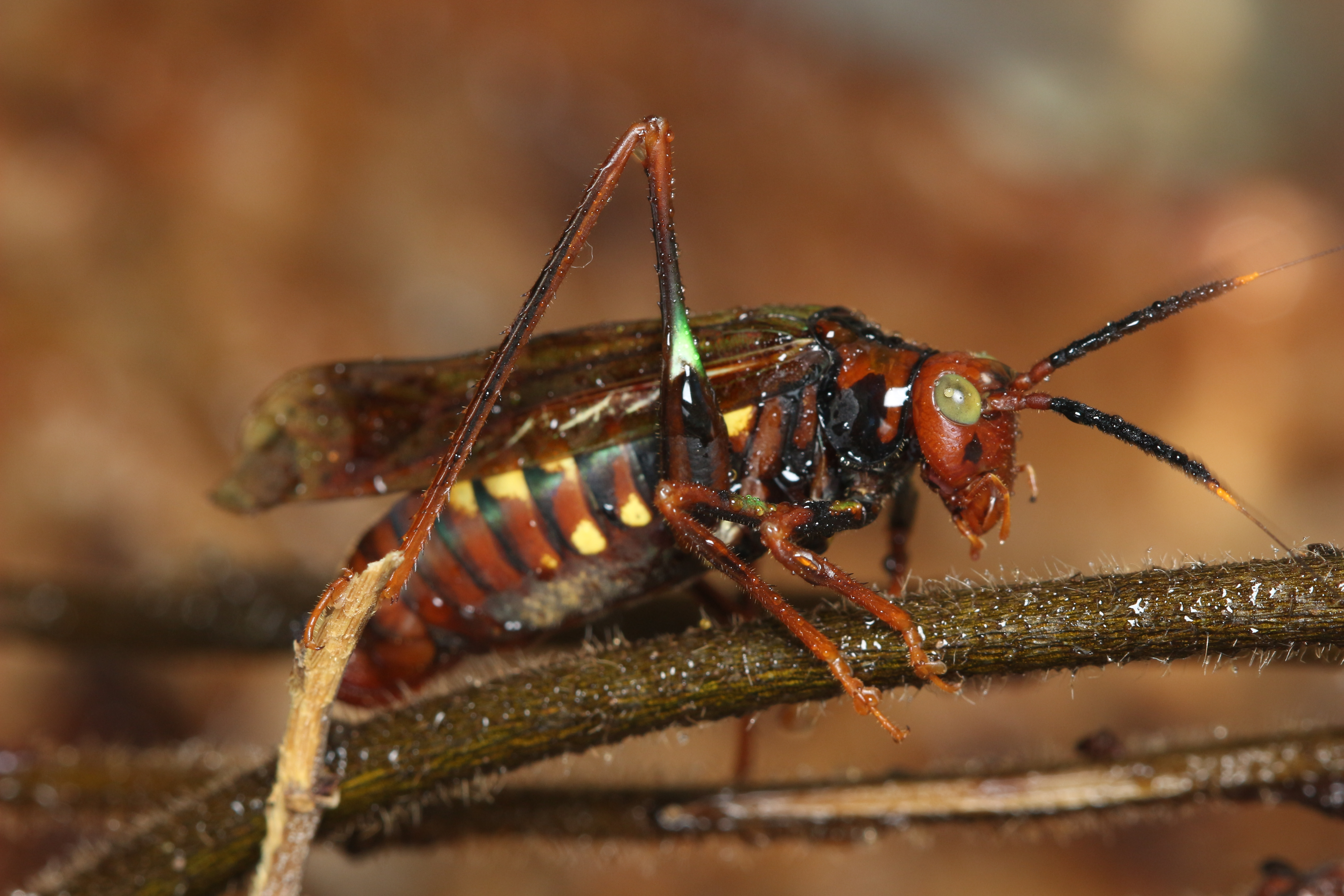
Scaphura nigra

Scaphurini Westwood, 1838 – South America

1. Scaphura Kirby, 1825

=== Scudderiini ===
Auth.: Brunner von Wattenwyl, 1878 – Americas

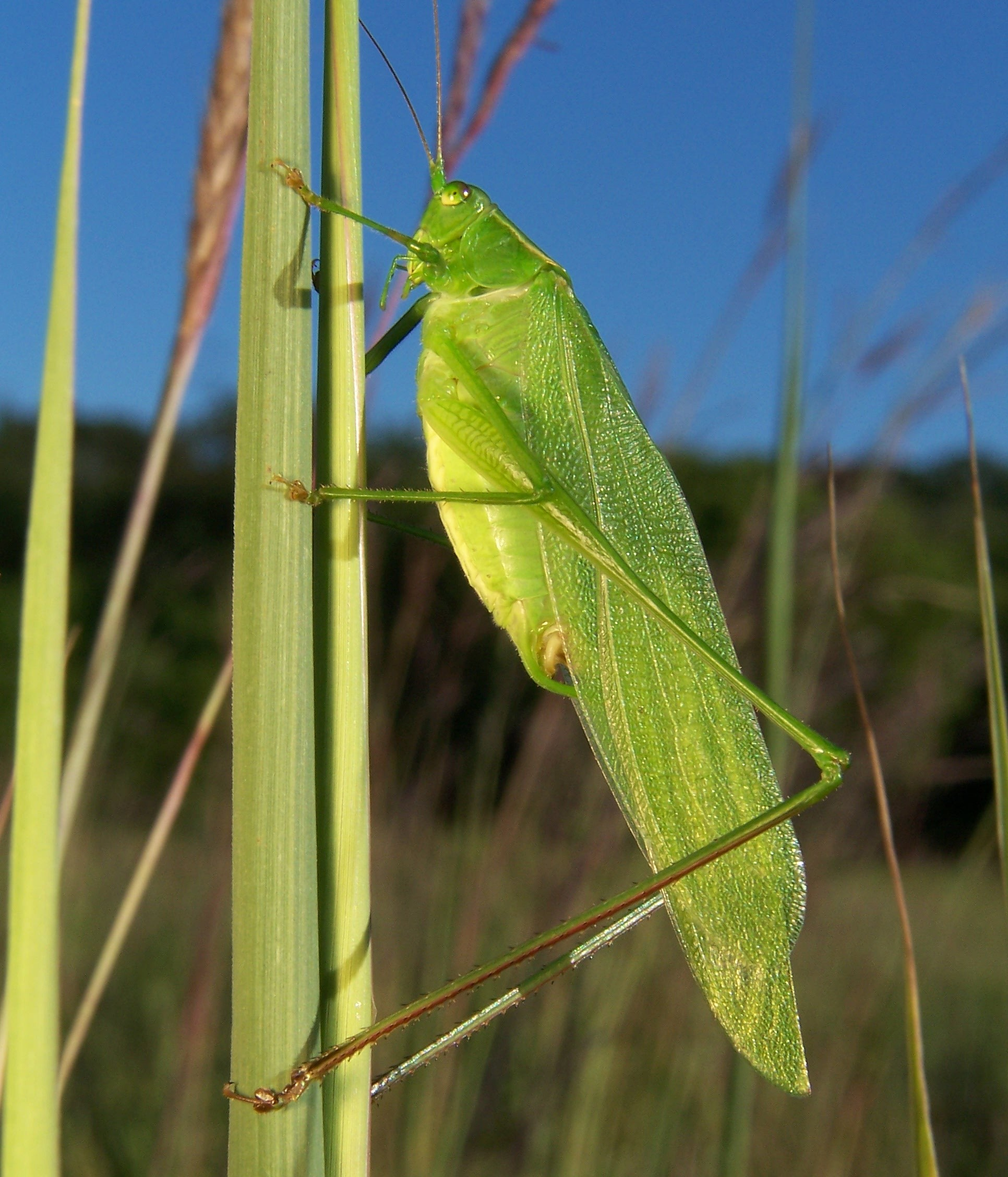
Scudderia sp.

- Aganacris Walker, 1871
- Caroliniella Cadena-Castañeda, 2015 (note: name conflict with Coleopteran)
- Ceraia Brunner von Wattenwyl, 1891
- Ceraiaella Hebard, 1933
- Ctenophorema Piza, 1967
- Euceraia Hebard, 1927
- Harroweria Hebard, 1927
- Homotoicha Brunner von Wattenwyl, 1891
- Inscudderia Caudell, 1921
- Ligocatinus Rehn, 1901
- Parascudderia Brunner von Wattenwyl, 1891
- Phanerocercus Piza, 1980
- Scudderia Stål, 1873
- Theudoria Stål, 1874
- Vellea Walker, 1869
- Zenirella Piza, 1973

=== Steirodontini ===
Auth.: Brunner von Wattenwyl, 1878 – Americas; 3 subtribes:

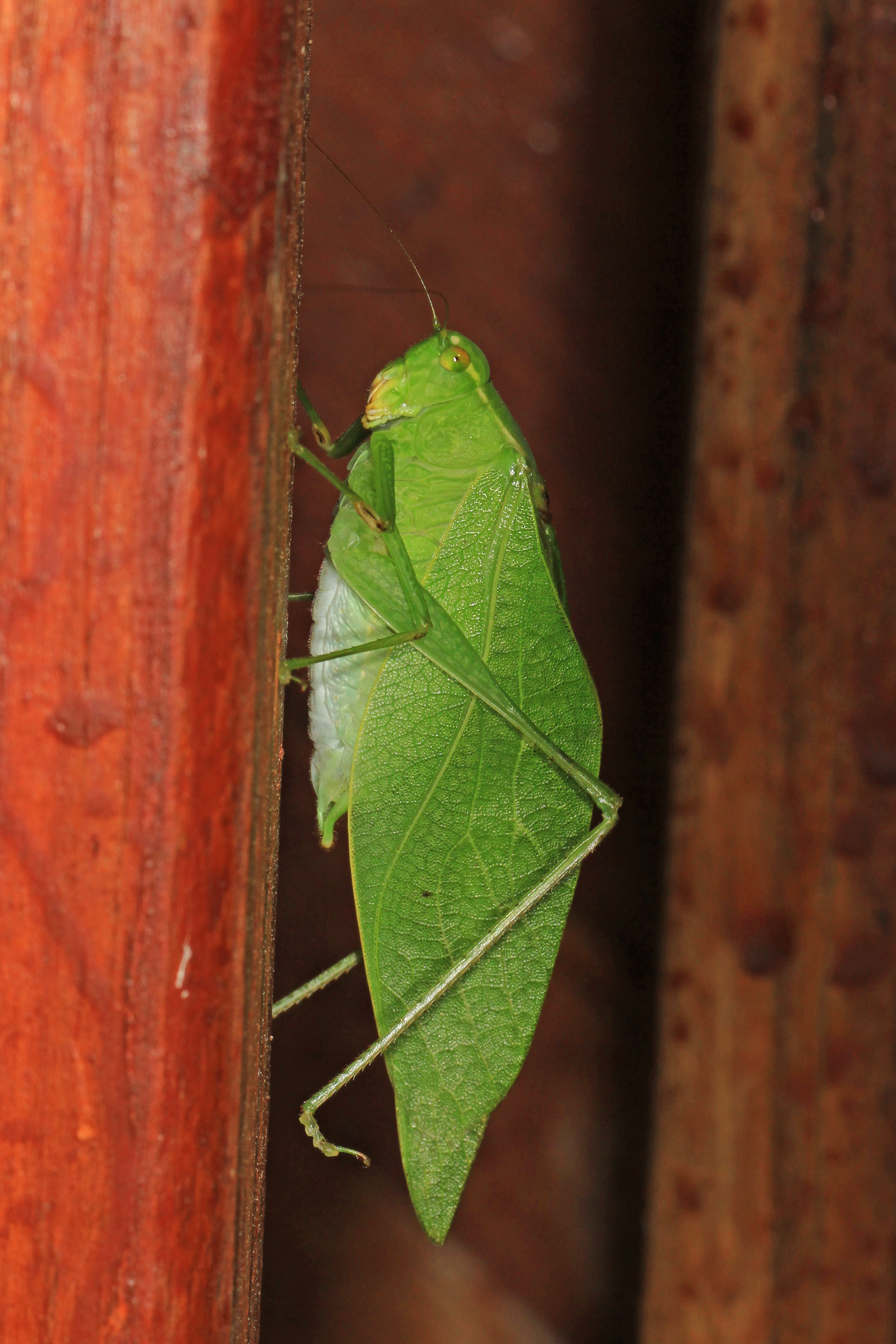
Microcentrum retinerve

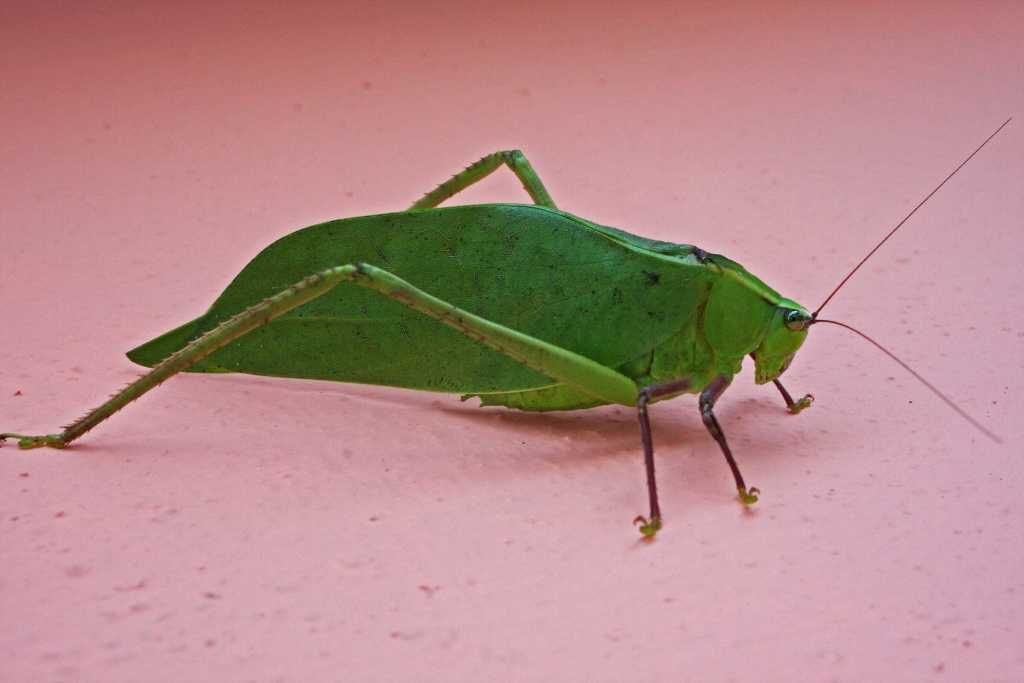
Stilpnochlora couloniana

==== Microcentrina ====
Auth.: Brunner von Wattenwyl, 1878 (previously tribe Microcentrini) – Americas

1. Acropsis Uvarov, 1939
2. Apoballa Brunner von Wattenwyl, 1878
3. Ischyra Brunner von Wattenwyl, 1878: includes subgenus Anapolisia, Caauara & Hyalipenna
4. Lamprophyllum Hebard, 1924
5. Lobophyllus Saussure, 1859
6. Microcentrum Scudder, 1862: includes subgenus Boroseiyla
7. Petaloptera Saussure, 1859
8. Philophyllia Stål, 1873
9. Phoebolampta Brunner von Wattenwyl, 1878
10. Raggophyllum Nickle, 1967
11. Tropicophyllum Koçak & Kemal, 2008: includes subgenus Capanema
12. Tuaia Mendes, Chamorro-Rengifo & Rafael, 2020: includes subgenus Capiguara
13. Tukunha Mendes & Rafael, 2021
- subtribe Steirodontina - subtropical and tropical Americas
1. Cnemidophyllum Rehn, 1917
2. Coronophyllum Mendes, Sobral & Silva-Neto, 2023
3. Emsleyfolium Cadena-Castañeda, Mendes & Alves-Oliveira, 2016
4. Steirodon Serville, 1831
- subtribe Stilpnochlorina Gorochov, 2026
1. Nicklephyllum Cadena-Castañeda, 2016
2. Problemovapex Gorochov, 2026
3. Stilpnochlora Stål, 1873
4. Syntechna Brunner von Wattenwyl, 1878

Taeniomenini Brunner von Wattenwyl, 1878 – Australia

1. Elephantodeta Brunner von Wattenwyl, 1878
2. Tinzeda Walker, 1869

=== Terpnistrini ===
Auth.: Brunner von Wattenwyl, 1878 – Africa, Sri Lanka

1. Diogena Brunner von Wattenwyl, 1878
2. Gelotopoia Brunner von Wattenwyl, 1891
3. Terpnistria Stål, 1873
4. Terpnistrioides Ragge, 1980
5. Tropidophrys Karsch, 1896

=== Trachyzulphini ===
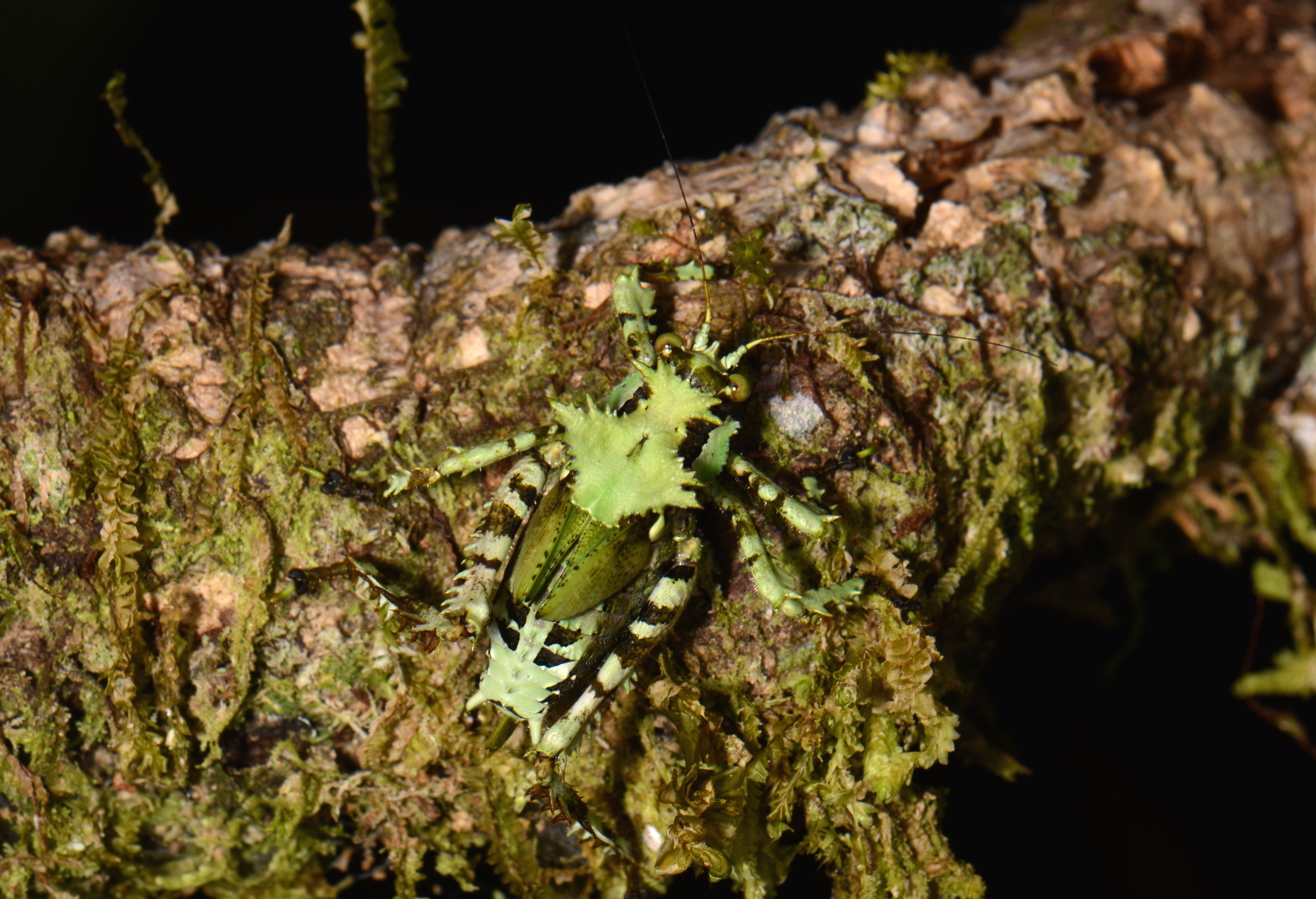
Trachyzulpha sp.

Auth.: Gorochov, 2014 – China, Indochina, Malesia

1. Trachyzulpha Dohrn, 1892

=== Trigonocoryphini ===
Auth.: Bei-Bienko, 1954 – Middle East, India, Malaysia

1. Cosmozoma Karsch, 1889
2. Megotoessa Karsch, 1889
3. Trigonocorypha Stål, 1873

Turpiliini Brunner von Wattenwyl, 1878 – Central America, Caribbean

1. Turpilia Stål, 1874
2. Turpiliodes Hebard, 1932

=== Tylopsidini ===
Auth.: Brunner von Wattenwyl, 1878 – Africa, Europe, Middle East, western Asia

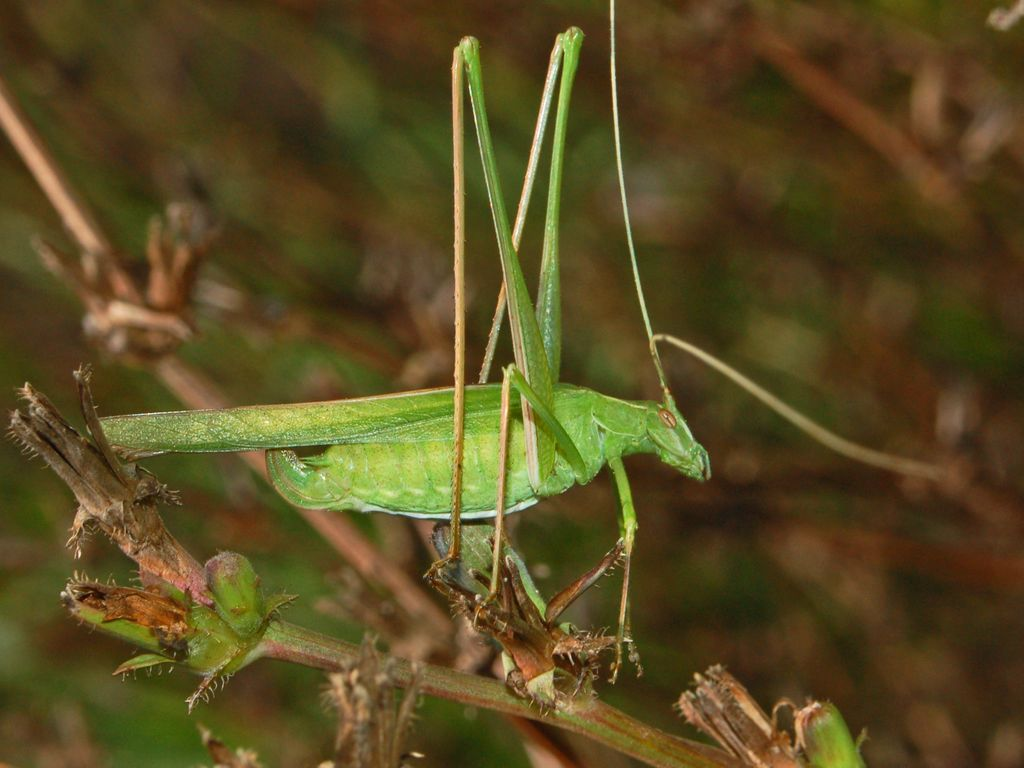
Tylopsis lilifolia

1. Tylopsis Fieber, 1853

=== Vossiini ===
Auth.: Cadena-Castañeda, 2015 – Africa, Asia

- subtribe Vossiina Cadena-Castañeda, 2015 – Africa
1. Azamia Bolívar, 1906
2. Vossia Brunner von Wattenwyl, 1891
- subtribe Xantiina Cadena-Castañeda, 2015 – Asia
1. Paraxantia Liu & Kang, 2009 – China
2. Xantia Brunner von Wattenwyl, 1878 – Borneo

=== Zeuneriini ===
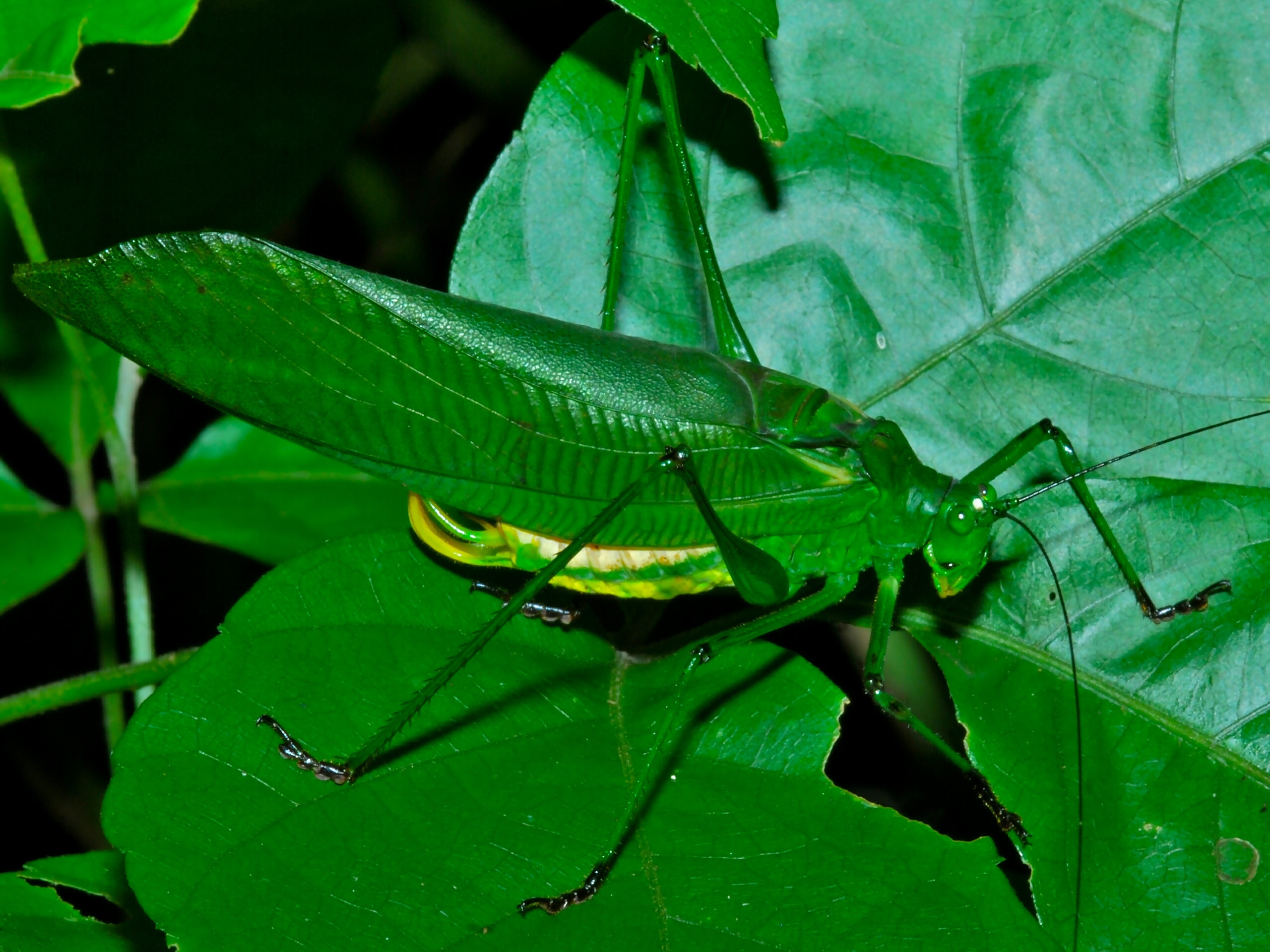
Zeuneria melanopeza

Auth.: Karsh, 1890 - tropical Africa

1. Gravenreuthia Karsch, 1892
2. Horatosphaga Schaum, 1853
3. Zeuneria Karsch, 1889

=== Incertae sedis ===
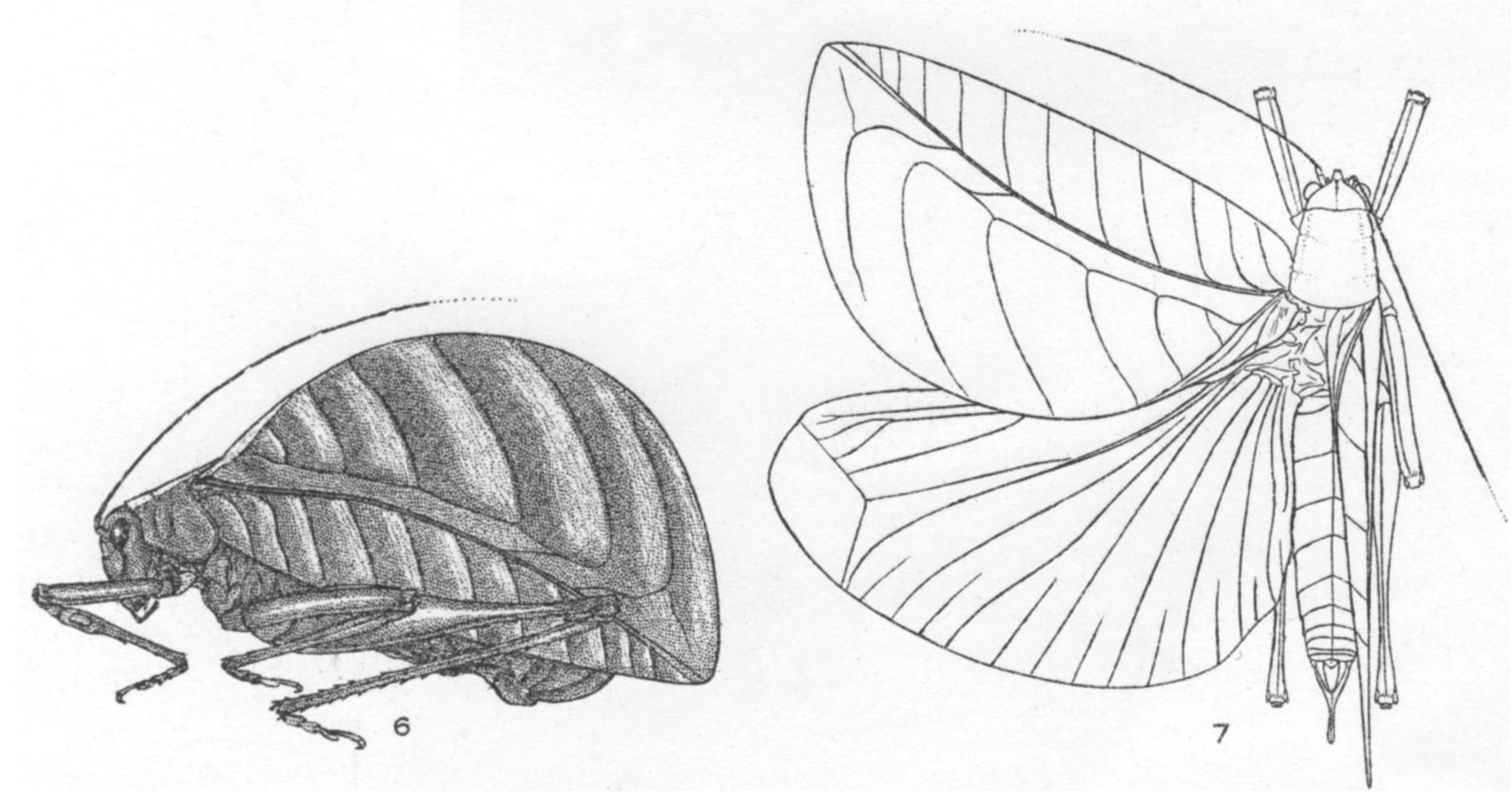
Female Eulophophyllum thaumasium

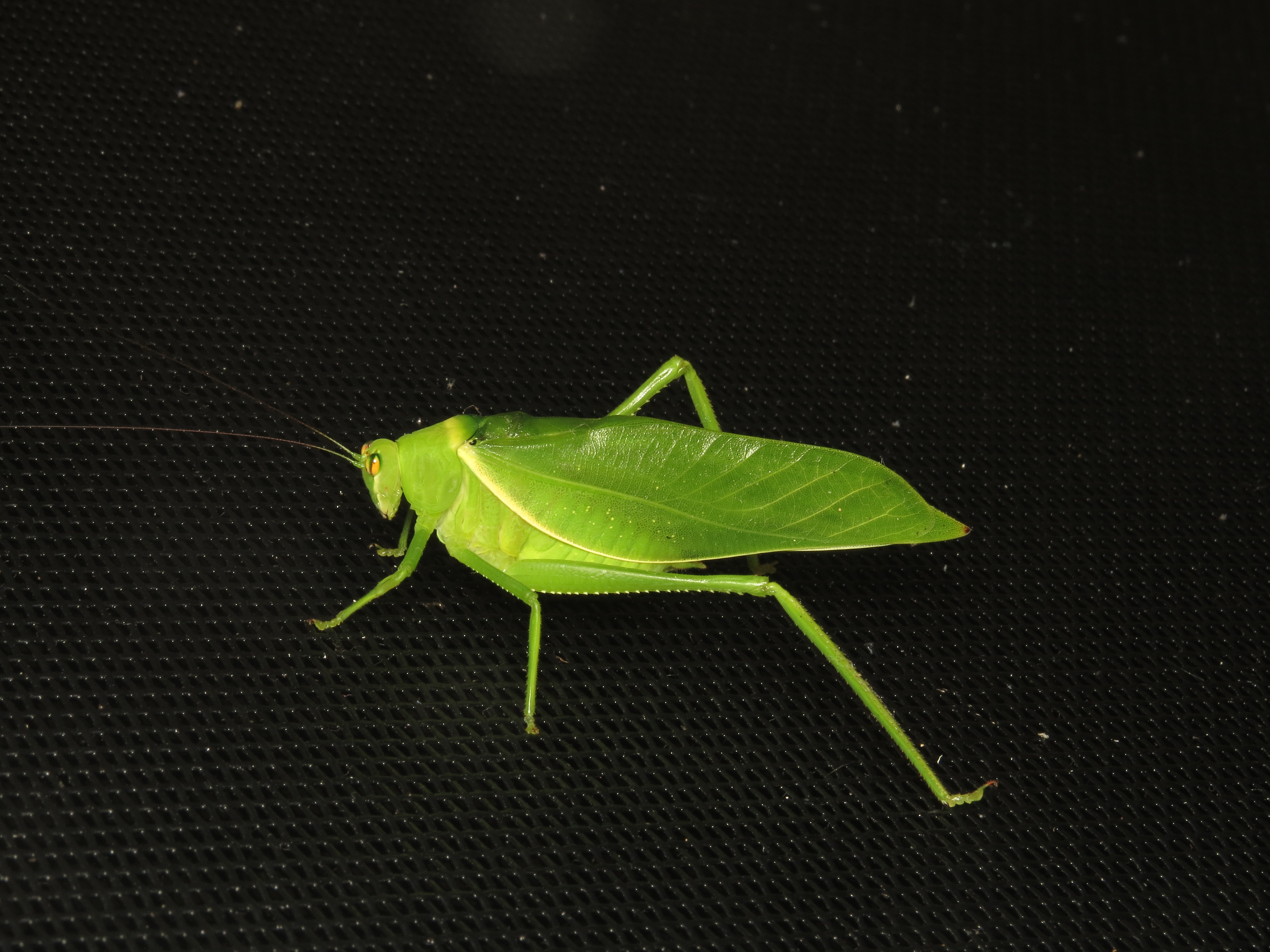
Paracaedicia serrata

These genera have not been placed in a tribe:

- Alloducetia Xia & Liu, 1992
- Anchispora Brunner von Wattenwyl, 1891
- Angustithorax Massa, 2015
- Anisotochra Karsch, 1889
- Anormalous Liu, 2011
- Aphroptera Bolívar, 1902
- Astathomima Karny, 1929
- Austrodontura Fontana & Buzzetti, 2004
- Balneum Piza, 1967
- Baryprostha Karsch, 1891
- Bertius Piza, 1974
- Bongeia Sjöstedt, 1902
- Brinckiella Chopard, 1955
- Brycoptera Ragge, 1981
- Bueacola Sjöstedt, 1912
- Chinensis Özdikmen, 2009
- Chloroscirtus Saussure & Pictet, 1897 - Americas
- Choirorhynchus Piza, 1974
- Conversifastigia Liu & Kang, 2008
- Corycomima Karsch, 1896
- Corymeta Brunner von Wattenwyl, 1878
- Diastellidea Bolívar, 1902
- Dicranopsyra Dohrn, 1892
- Ectomoptera Ragge, 1980
- Elbeniopsis Dohrn, 1906
- Enthephippion Bruner, 1915
- Ephippitythoidea Tepper, 1892
- Eulophophyllum Hebard, 1922
- Euryastes Ragge, 1980
- Euxenica Bruner, 1915
- Execholyrus Henry, 1940
- Gabonella Uvarov, 1940
- Gatunella Uvarov, 1940
- Gelatopoiidion Zacher, 1909
- Gregoryella Uvarov, 1925
- Harposcepa Karsch, 1896
- Indogneta Ingrisch & Shishodia, 2000
- Itokiia Sjöstedt, 1902
- Ivensia Bolívar, 1890
- Japygophana Carl, 1921
- Khaoyaiana Ingrisch, 1990
- Ladnea Walker, 1869
- Lunidia Hemp, 2010
- Macedna Karsch, 1891
- Materuana Hemp, 2017
- Meruterrana Sjöstedt, 1912
- Milititsa Burr, 1900
- Miltinobates Sjöstedt, 1902
- Mimoscudderia Carl, 1914
- Myllocentrum Ragge, 1962
- Natricia Walker, 1869
- Nesoscirtella Carl, 1914
- Niphella Bolívar, 1900
- Oxyecous Chopard, 1935
- Paracaedicia Brunner von Wattenwyl, 1891
- Parapelerinus Liu & Kang, 2008
- Paraperopyrrhicia Ebner, 1915
- Paraphylloptera Carl, 1914
- Parapolichne Bolívar, 1902
- Phaneroptila Uvarov, 1957
- Physocorypha Karsch, 1896
- Platycaedicia Hebard, 1922
- Platylyra Scudder, 1898
- Polygamus Carl, 1914
- Procaedicia Bolívar, 1902
- Pronomapyga Rehn, 1914
- Pseudomacedna Liu, 2014
- Pseudopreussia Hemp, 2017
- Puerula Bolívar, 1906
- Qinlingea Liu & Kang, 2007
- Raggeiella Cadena-Castañeda, 2015
- Raggophyllum Nickle, 1967
- Sanabria Walker, 1869
- Scolocerca Ragge, 1980
- Semicarinata Liu & Kang, 2007
- Sikoriella Carl, 1914
- Stylomolpa Karny, 1926
- Sympaestroides Willemse, 1942
- Tropidonotacris Chopard, 1954
