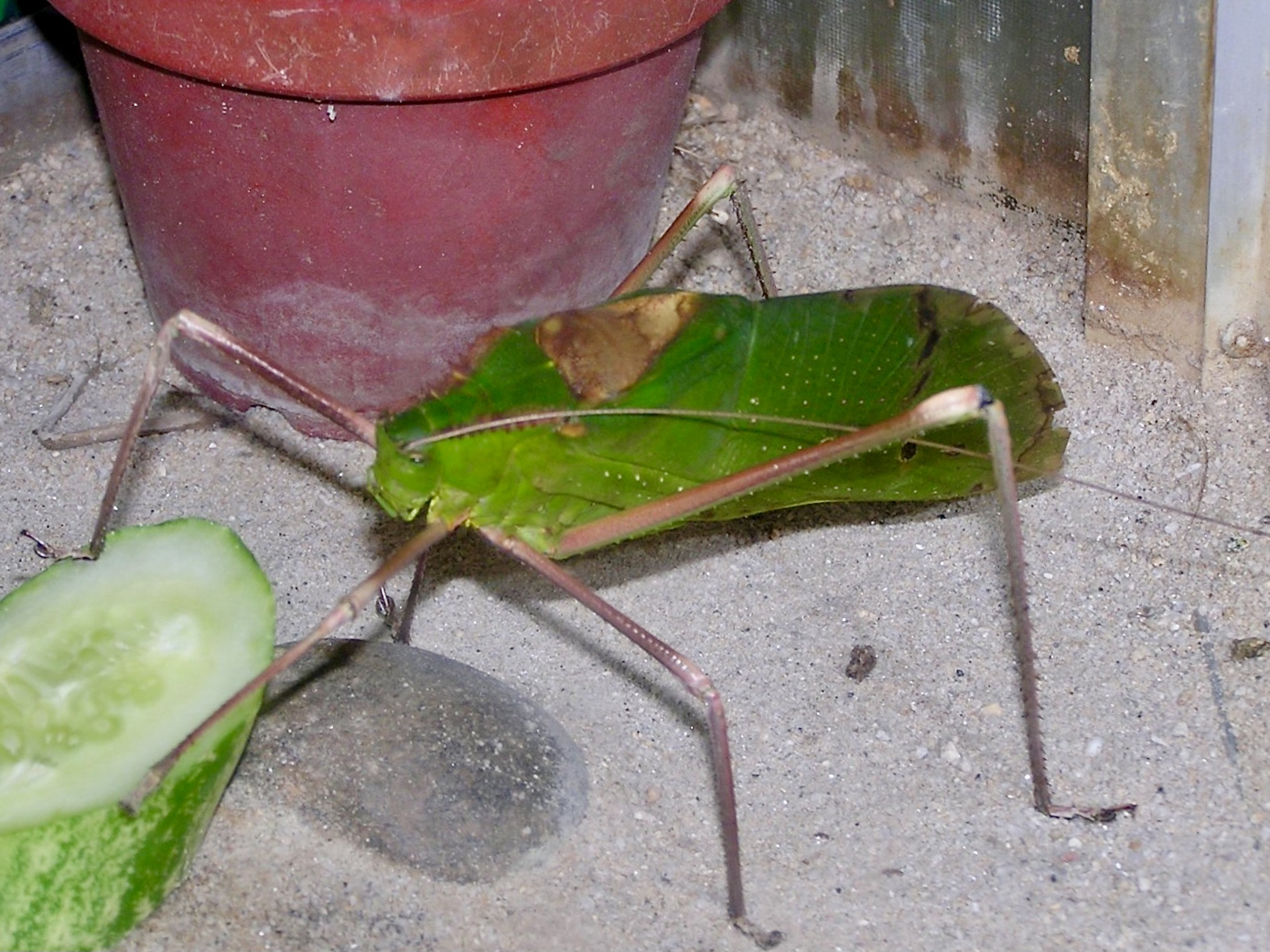

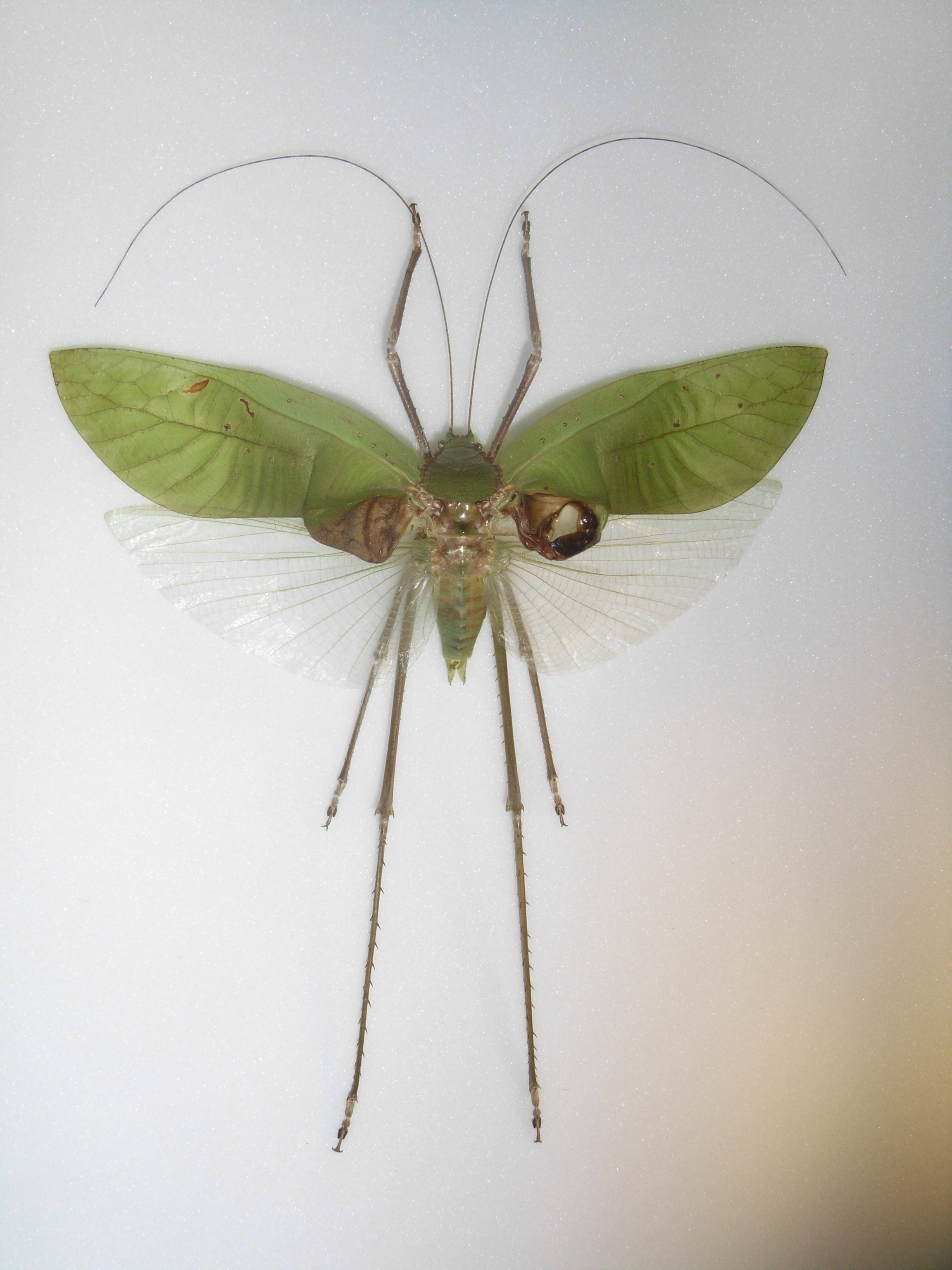
- At Kuala Lumpur Butterfly Park (above); specimen with spread wings (below)

Scientific classification
- Kingdom: Animalia
- Phylum: Arthropoda
- Clade: Pancrustacea
- Class: Insecta
- Order: Orthoptera
- Suborder: Ensifera
- Family: Tettigoniidae
- Genus: Arachnacris
- Species: A. corporalis

Binomial name
- Arachnacris corporalis (Karny, 1924)

Synonyms
- Macrolyristes corporalis Karny, 1924

= Arachnacris corporalis =

Species of cricket-like animal

Arachnacris corporalis, the giant Malaysian katydid, giant long-legged katydid, or giant katydid (not to be confused with Stilpnochlora couloniana, a species native to the United States), is a large species of bush cricket or katydid that is native to Malaysia. It is the largest species of katydid in the world.

== Description ==
The giant Malaysian katydid is a large, green insect that is, on average, about 15 cm (6 in) long. It has long, thin legs, like most katydids, with the hind legs being longer than the front two pairs of legs. Its long, leaf-like wings help it stay camouflaged from predators, as it typically resids in trees and does not move very much. As it ages, its coloration mimics a leaf, and the tips of the wings become brown to resemble the way that leaves rot. The amount of brown on its wings can be used as a method to determine the age of the katydid, with more brown meaning an older age.

Like all katydids, the species makes a loud chirping sound by scraping a toothed, stridulatory file found near the base of one wing against a scraper located on the opposite wing. This sound is a defense mechanism and attracts mates.

=== Sexual dimorphism ===
Adult males and females of the species are easily distinguished, as females have a green pronotum (the triangular segment at the dorsal base of their wings) and males have a brown one, which is.

== Lifecycle and reproduction ==
Females have an ovipositor, which they use to lay their eggs in moss or rotting wood. When they reach their adult stage, they start out bright green, and as they get older, the tips of their wings turn brown, leading to a larger brown patch the older the katydid is. They live for about 6 months in their adult stage.

== Predator defense ==
Their primary defense is camouflage due to their leaf-like coloration. To prevent being tracked down by scent, they throw their feces as far away from themselves as possible, usually to a neighboring bush or tree. They can also use their loud chirping to scare away predators, as the volume is amplified due to their size.
