= Zacatula =

Zacatula may refer to:

- Zacatula, Guerrero a Mexican town in the municipality of La Unión de Isidoro Montes de Oca
- Zacatula (insect), a genus of insects in the family Tettigoniidae
