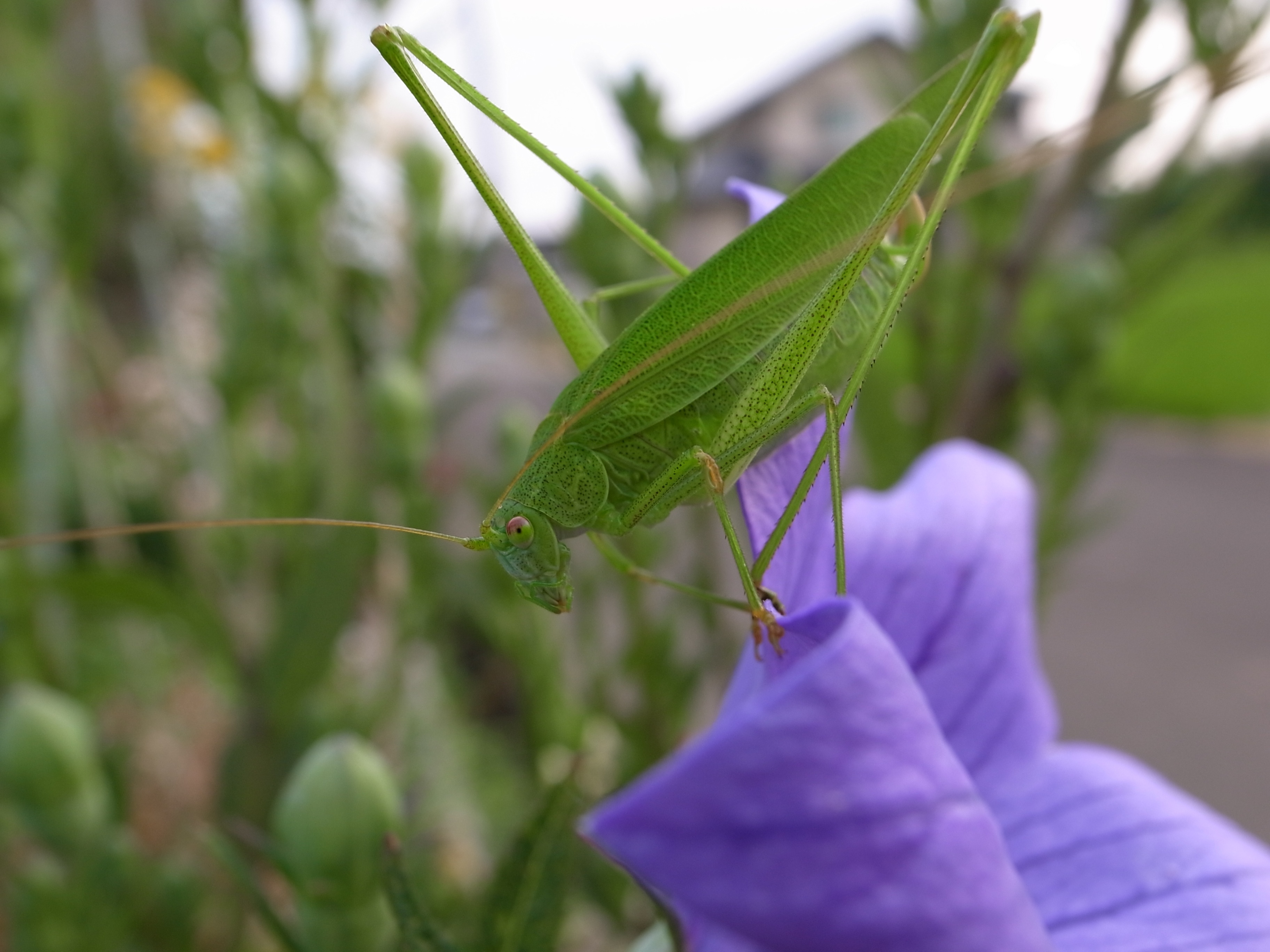
- Mecopoda nipponensis

Scientific classification
- Kingdom: Animalia
- Phylum: Arthropoda
- Class: Insecta
- Order: Orthoptera
- Suborder: Ensifera
- Infraorder: Tettigoniidea
- Superfamily: Tettigonioidea
- Family: Tettigoniidae
- Subfamily: Mecopodinae; Walker, 1871

Synonyms
- (Acrdidoxenini): Mecopodidae Walker, 1871; Mecopodidi Walker, 1871

= Mecopodinae =

Subfamily of cricket-like animals

Mecopodinae are a subfamily of bush crickets found in western South America, sub-Saharan Africa, and Asia. In Asia, the distribution includes India, Indochina, Japan, the Philippines, and Malesia to Papua New Guinea and Australasia, including many Pacific islands.

Mecopodinae are characterized by their leaf-like forms, but are sometimes called "the long-legged katydids". It is a paraphyletic grouping that is part of the Phaneropteroid clade: sister to Phaneropterinae and Pseudophyllinae. Although as of December 2018, Orthoptera Species File places Mecopodinae within the family Tettigoniidae, the family Phaneropteridae has been recommended for reinstatement, with subfamilies Mecopodinae, Pseudophyllinae, Phyllophorinae, and Phaneropterinae.

== Tribes and genera ==
As of June 2018, the Orthoptera Species File lists the following tribes and genera:

=== Acridoxenini ===
Auth: Zeuner, 1936 (West Africa)

- Acridoxena White, 1865

=== Aprosphylini ===
Auth: Naskrecki, 1994 (southern Africa)

- Aprosphylus Pictet, 1888
- Cedarbergeniana Naskrecki, 1994
- Ewanella Naskrecki, 1994
- Griffiniana Karny, 1910
- Pseudosaga Brancsik, 1898
- Zitsikama Péringuey, 1916

=== Leproscirtini ===
Auth: Gorochov, 1988 (equatorial Africa)

- Leproscirtus Karsch, 1891

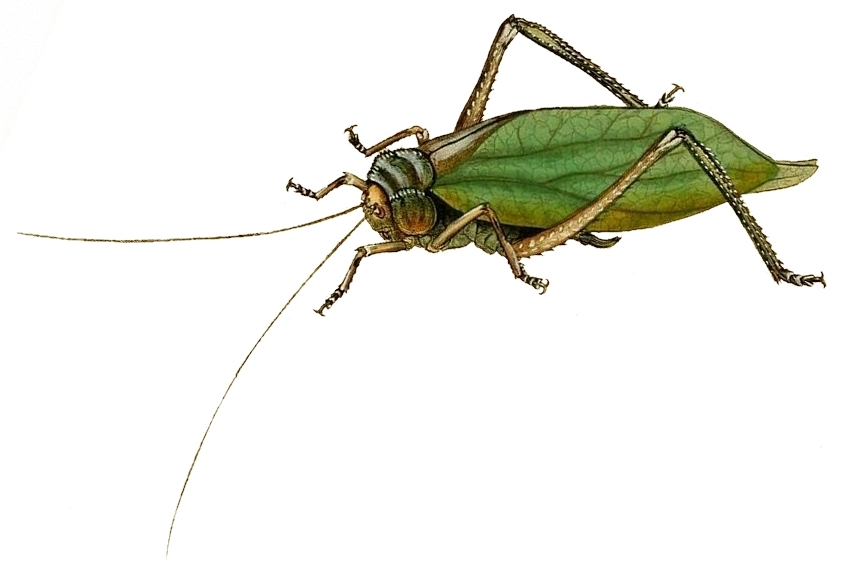
Arachnacris amboinensis illustration

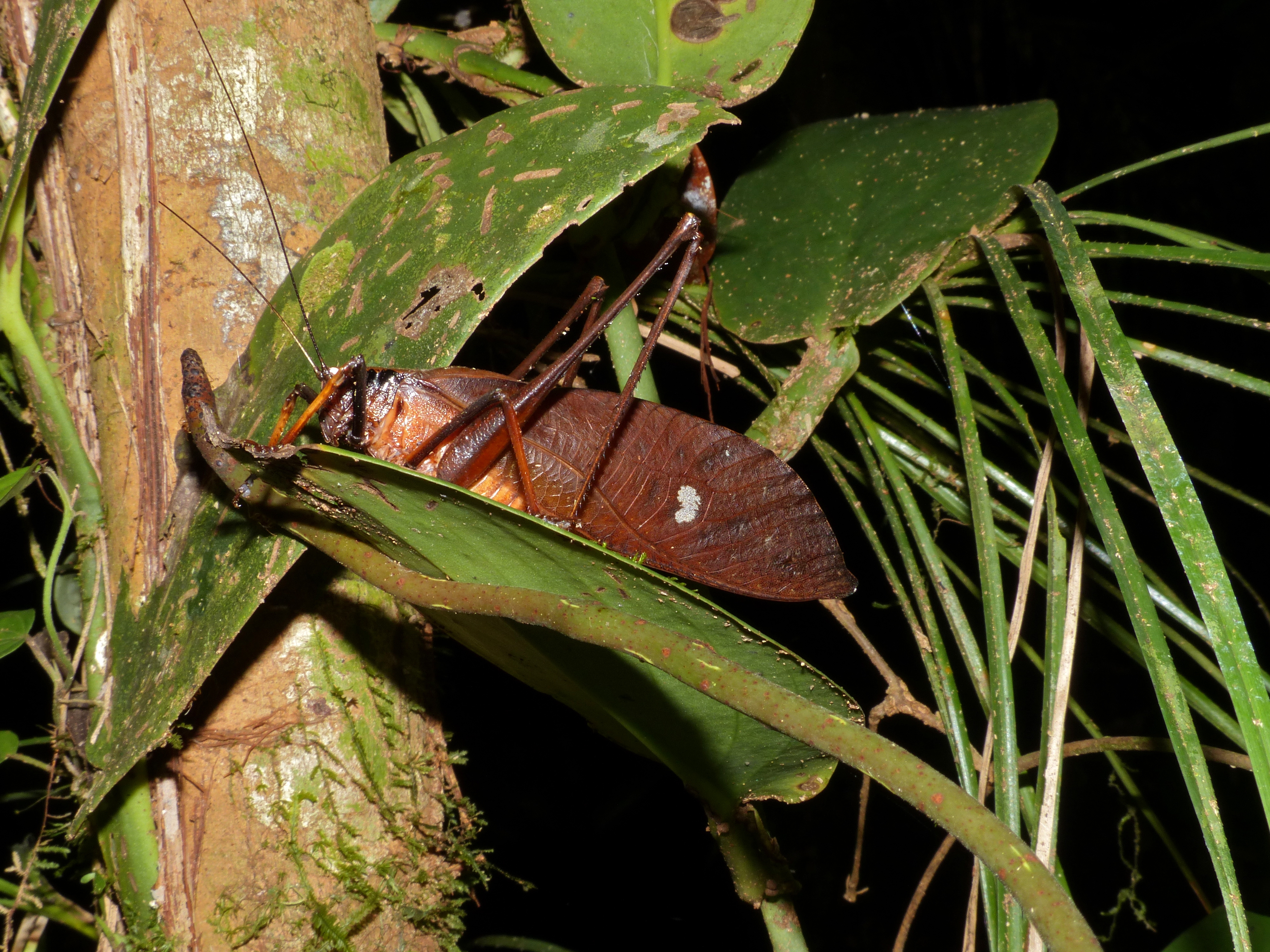
Unknown Eumecapoda species

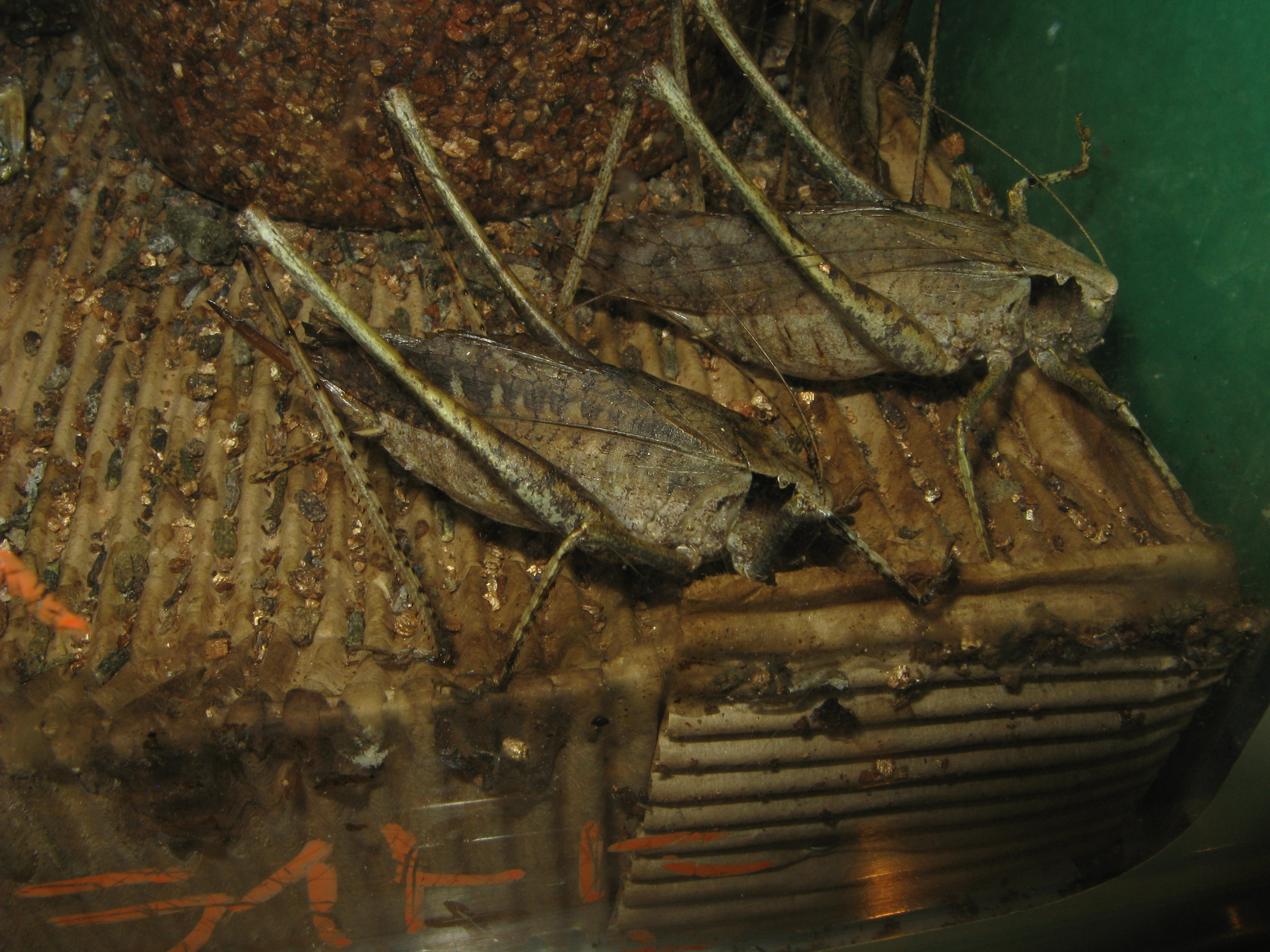
Mecopoda elongata

=== Mecopodini ===
Auth: Walker, 1871 (Africa, Asia: India through to Australia)

1. Afromecopoda Uvarov, 1940 (west and central Africa)
2. Anoedopoda Karsch, 1891 (Africa)
3. Arachnacris Giebel, 1861 (Malesia)
4. Austromecopoda Rentz, Su & Ueshima, 2006 (Australia)
5. Characta Redtenbacher, 1892 (Malesia)
6. Eumecopoda Hebard, 1922 (Philippines, Papua New Guinea, Australia)
7. Mecopoda Serville, 1831 (India, China, Korea, Japan, Indochina, Malesia, Melanesia)

=== Pomatonotini ===
Auth: Willemse, 1961 (southern Africa)

- Pomatonota Burmeister, 1838

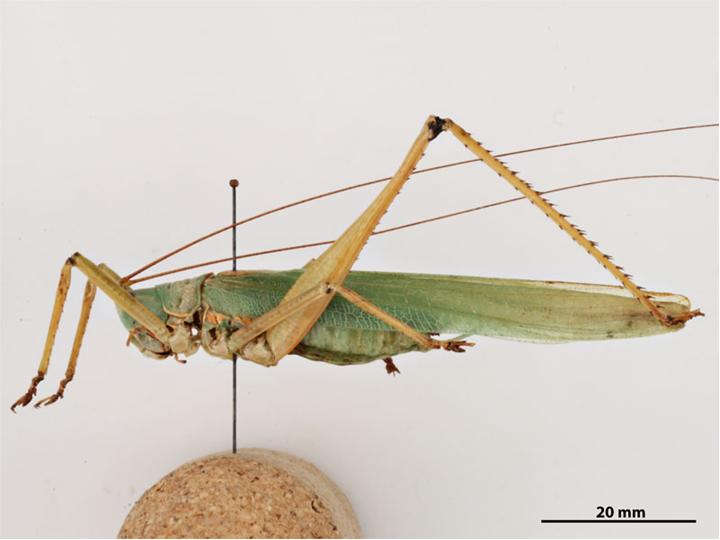
Segestes decoratus

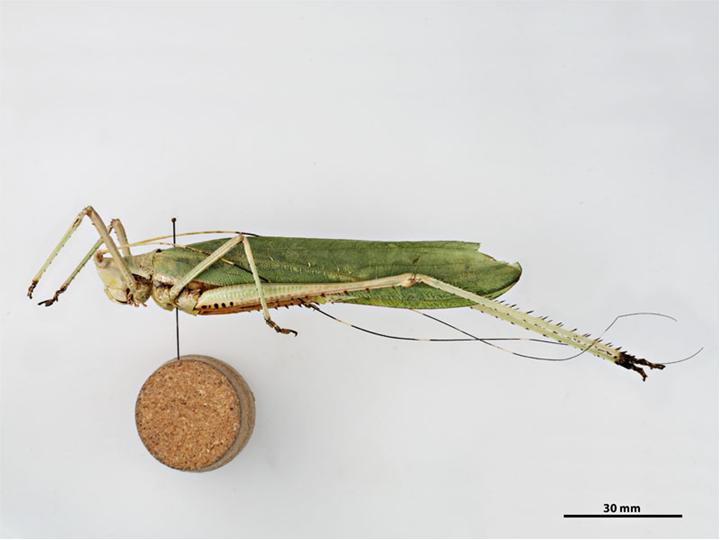
Segestidea novaeguineae

=== Sexavini ===
Auth: Karny, 1924 ("Sexavaini" was an orthographical variant) - central Malesia to Australia (not Sumatra or mainland Asia)

- Biroa Bolívar, 1903
- Gressittiella Willemse, 1961
- Leptophyoides Willemse, 1961
- Paraphrictidea Willemse, 1933
- Phrictaeformia Willemse, 1961
- Phrictaetypus Brunner von Wattenwyl, 1898
- Phrictidea Bolívar, 1911
- Pseudophrictaetypus Willemse, 1961
- Pseudophyllanax Walker, 1869

subtribe Mossulina Willemse, 1961

(Java to Papua New Guinea and Pacific islands)

- Albertisiella Griffini, 1908
- Dasyphleps Karsch, 1891
- Diaphlebopsis Karny, 1931
- Diaphlebus Karsch, 1891
- Huona Kuthy, 1910
- Mossula Walker, 1869
- Mossuloides Willemse, 1940
- Neodiaphlebus Kästner, 1934
- Ocica Walker, 1869
- Paradiaphlebopsis Kästner, 1934
- Paradiaphlebus Bolívar, 1903
- Paramossula Willemse, 1940

subtribe Sexavina Karny, 1924

(Australasia to the Philippines)

- Segestes Stål, 1877
- Segestidea Bolívar, 1903
- Sexava Walker, 1870

=== Tabariini ===
Auth: Braun, Chamorro Rengifo & Morris, 2009 (South America)

- Encentra Redtenbacher, 1892
- Rhammatopoda Redtenbacher, 1892
- Tabaria Walker, 1870

=== Tribe unallocated ===
1. Apteroscirtus Karsch, 1891 (Africa)
2. Aulocrania Uvarov, 1940 (Sri Lanka)
3. Charisoma Bolívar, 1903 (Papua New Guinea)
4. Corycoides Uvarov, 1939 (Africa)
5. Elumiana Uvarov, 1940 (Congo)
6. Gymnoscirtus Karsch, 1891 (east Africa)
7. Ityocephala Redtenbacher, 1892 (Pacific islands)
8. Kheilia Bolívar, 1898 (Papua New Guinea)
9. Pachysmopoda Karsch, 1886 (Socotra)
10. Philoscirtus Karsch, 1896 (east Africa)
11. Strongyloderus: S. serraticollis Westwood, 1834 (India)
12. Vetralla (insect) Walker, 1869 (Sri Lanka: synonym Euthypoda Karsch, 1886)
13. Zacatula Walker, 1870 (eastern Indonesia)
