= Sopatas' black-kneed katydid =

Conservation status
- Data Deficient (IUCN 3.1)

Scientific classification
- Domain: Eukaryota
- Kingdom: Animalia
- Phylum: Arthropoda
- Class: Insecta
- Order: Orthoptera
- Suborder: Ensifera
- Family: Tettigoniidae
- Genus: Aprosphylus
- Species: A. sopatarum

Binomial name
- Aprosphylus sopatarum Naskrecki, 1994

Species of cricket-like animal

Sopatas' black-kneed katydid (Aprosphylus sopatarum) is a species of katydid that is endemic to the Klein karoo biome of Western Cape province in South Africa. It is threatened by overgrazing by livestock and changes in weather patterns affecting its microhabitat.
