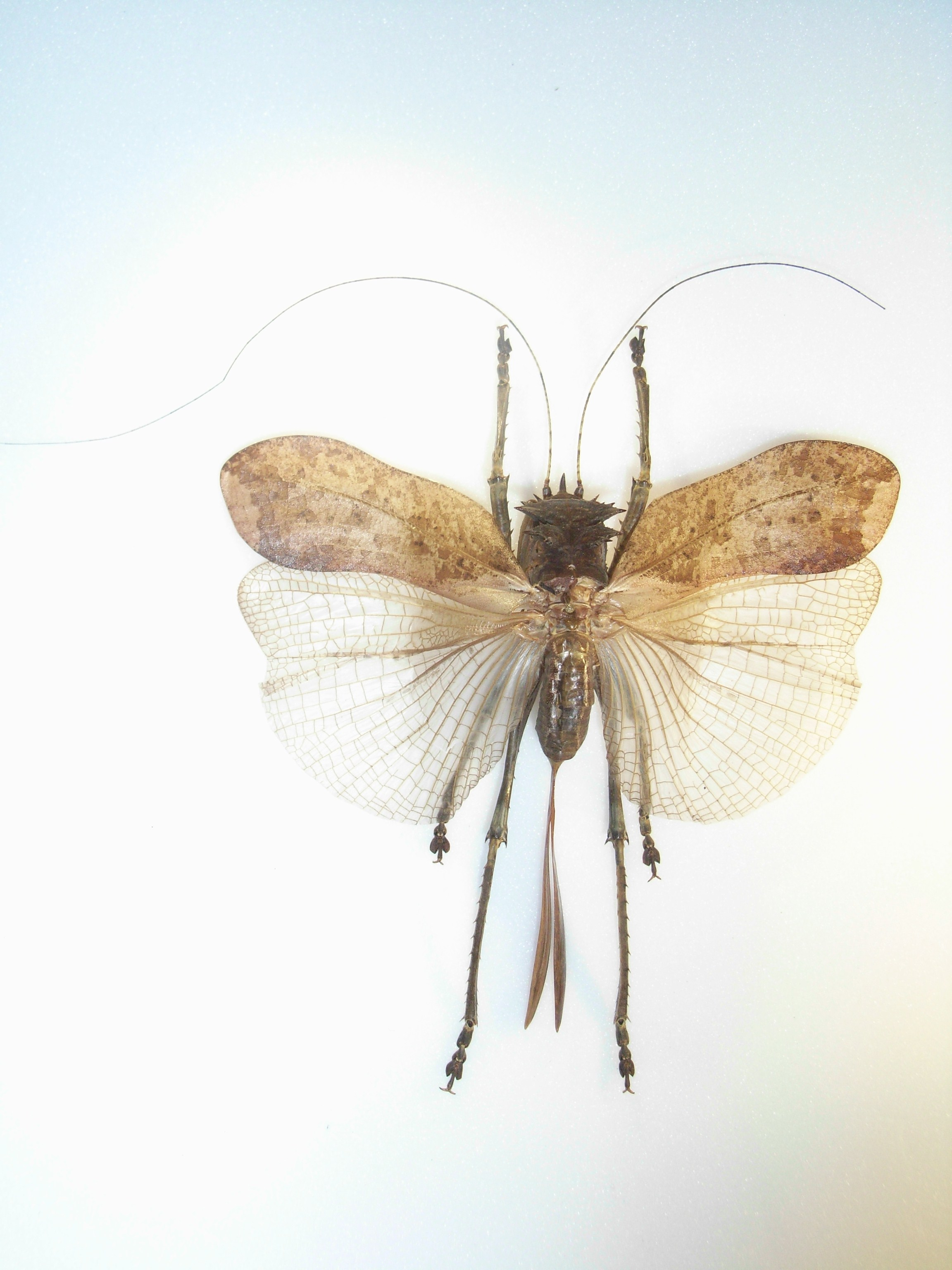
- Acridoxena hewaniana

Scientific classification
- Domain: Eukaryota
- Kingdom: Animalia
- Phylum: Arthropoda
- Class: Insecta
- Order: Orthoptera
- Suborder: Ensifera
- Family: Tettigoniidae
- Subfamily: Mecopodinae
- Tribe: Acridoxenini; Zeuner, 1936
- Genus: Acridoxena; White, 1865
- Species: A. hewaniana

Binomial name
- Acridoxena hewaniana White, 1865

Synonyms
- Eustalia Scudder, 1878; Stalia Scudder, 1875

= Acridoxena =

Genus of cricket-like animals

Acridoxena is a monotypic genus of bush crickets (also known as katydids). It is now placed in the tribe Acridoxenini of the subfamily Mecopodinae; previously it was in the subfamily Acridoxeninae. It has one species, Acridoxena hewaniana, found in western central Africa.
