= Aprosphylus =

Scientific classification
- Domain: Eukaryota
- Kingdom: Animalia
- Phylum: Arthropoda
- Class: Insecta
- Order: Orthoptera
- Suborder: Ensifera
- Family: Tettigoniidae
- Tribe: Aprosphylini
- Genus: Aprosphylus; Pictet, 1888

Species
- 3, see text.

Genus of cricket-like animals

Aprosphylus is a genus of katydids found in southern Africa.

It contains the following species:

- Aprosphylus olszanowskii Naskrecki, 1994 – Olszanowski's black-kneed katydid
- Aprosphylus hybridus Pictet, 1888 – Namibian black-kneed katydid
- Aprosphylus sopatarum Naskrecki, 1994 – Sopatas' black-kneed katydid
