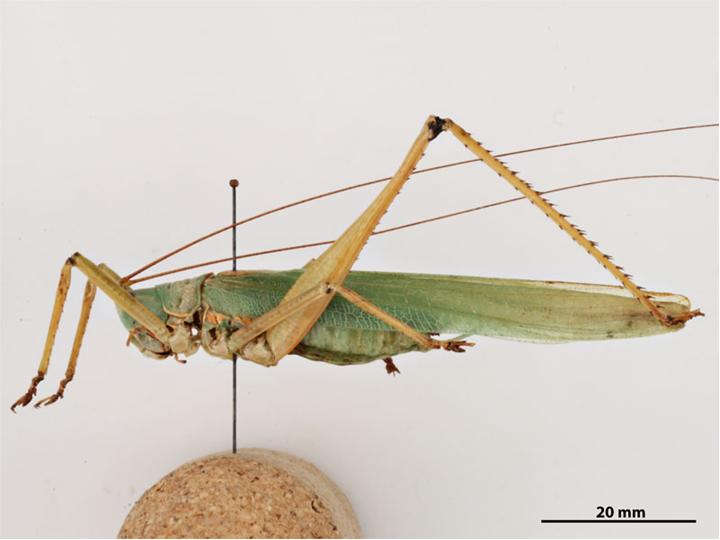
- Segestes decoratus

Scientific classification
- Kingdom: Animalia
- Phylum: Arthropoda
- Clade: Pancrustacea
- Class: Insecta
- Order: Orthoptera
- Suborder: Ensifera
- Family: Tettigoniidae
- Subfamily: Mecopodinae
- Tribe: Sexavini
- Genus: Segestes; Stål, 1877

= Segestes (katydid) =

Genus of cricket-like animals

Segestes is a genus of bush crickets in the subfamily Mecopodinae and tribe Sexavaini.

Species can be found in Australasia.

== Species ==
The Orthoptera Species File lists:

1. Segestes beieri Kästner, 1934
2. Segestes brevipennis Willemse, 1977
3. Segestes celebensis Karny, 1931
4. Segestes cornelii Willemse, 1977
5. Segestes decoratus Redtenbacher, 1892
6. Segestes frater Hebard, 1922
7. Segestes fuscus Redtenbacher, 1892
8. Segestes nostosalgos Tan & Wahab, 2020
9. Segestes punctipes Redtenbacher, 1892
10. Segestes stibicki Willemse, 1977
11. Segestes unicolor Redtenbacher, 1892
12. Segestes vittaticeps Stål, 1877 - type species
