= Olszanowski's black-kneed katydid =

Conservation status
- Least Concern (IUCN 3.1)

Scientific classification
- Domain: Eukaryota
- Kingdom: Animalia
- Phylum: Arthropoda
- Class: Insecta
- Order: Orthoptera
- Suborder: Ensifera
- Family: Tettigoniidae
- Genus: Aprosphylus
- Species: A. olszanowskii

Binomial name
- Aprosphylus olszanowskii Naskrecki, 1994

Species of cricket-like animal

Olszanowski's black-kneed katydid (Aprosphylus olszanowskii) is a species of katydid that is endemic to the Western Cape and Northern Cape provinces of South Africa. It is mostly found in fynbos, but it can also be found in succulent and Nama Karoo biomes. Most records are from between 700 and 1,000 m.
