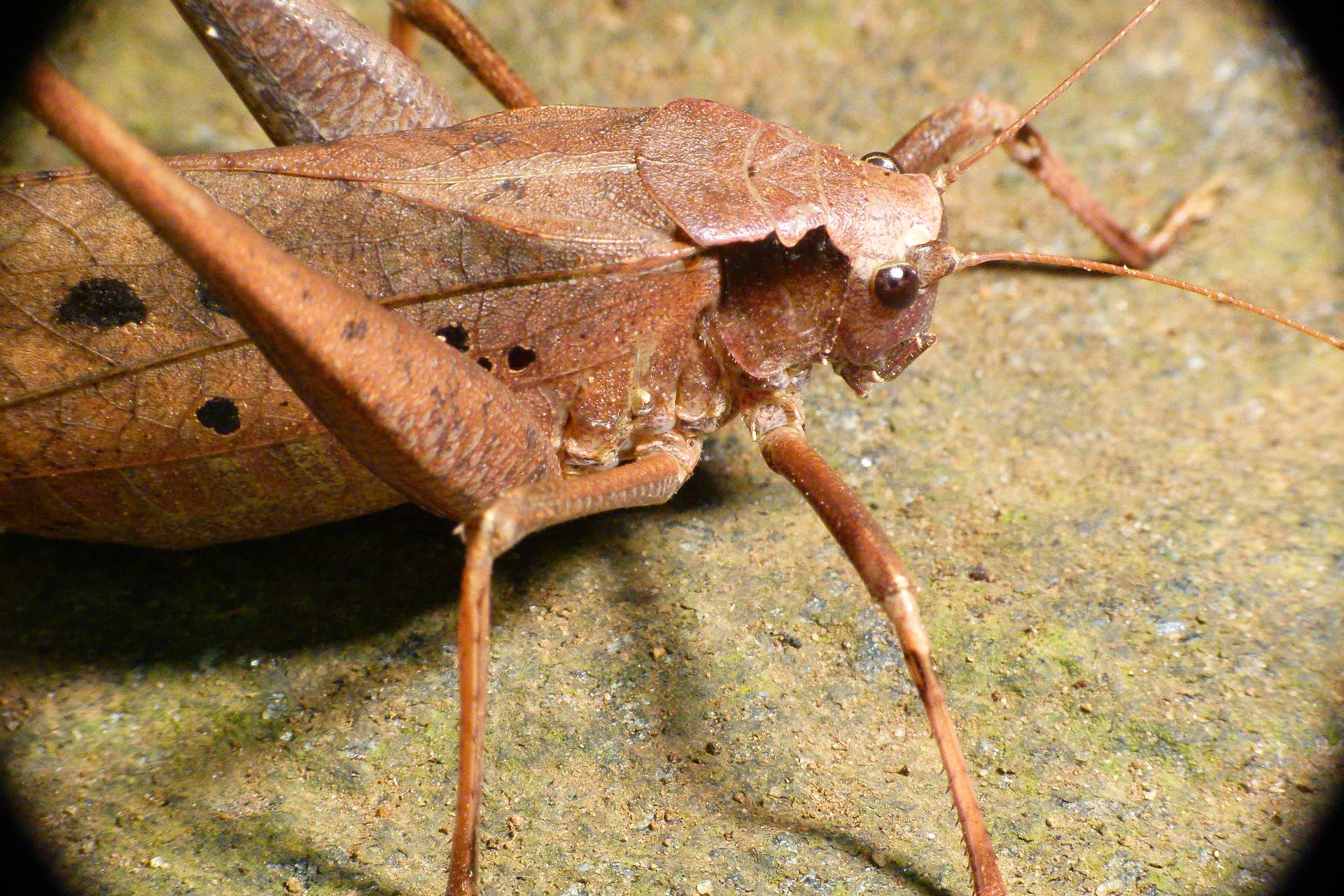
- Unidentified Mecopoda species

Scientific classification
- Domain: Eukaryota
- Kingdom: Animalia
- Phylum: Arthropoda
- Class: Insecta
- Order: Orthoptera
- Suborder: Ensifera
- Superfamily: Tettigonioidea
- Family: Tettigoniidae
- Subfamily: Mecopodinae
- Genus: Mecopoda; Serville, 1831

= Mecopoda =

Genus of cricket-like animals

Mecopoda is the type genus of bush crickets of the subfamily Mecopodinae. Species can be found in India, China, Korea, Japan, Indochina, Malaysia and Melanesia.

== Species ==
The genus was revised in 2021; the Orthoptera Species File now lists:

- species group Mecopoda elongata Linnaeus, 1758 - containing type species "M. maculata" Serville, which is a synonym of M. javana javana
- Other species:
1. Mecopoda ampla Gorochov, 2020
2. Mecopoda angusta Gorochov, 2020 (2 subspecies)
3. Mecopoda dilatata Redtenbacher, 1892 (2 subspecies)
4. Mecopoda divergens Redtenbacher, 1892
5. Mecopoda kerinci Gorochov, 2020
6. Mecopoda prominens Gorochov, 2020
7. Mecopoda shveri Gorochov, 2020
8. Mecopoda tenebrosa (Walker, 1869)
9. Mecopoda sirambeica Griffini, 1908

== Gallery ==
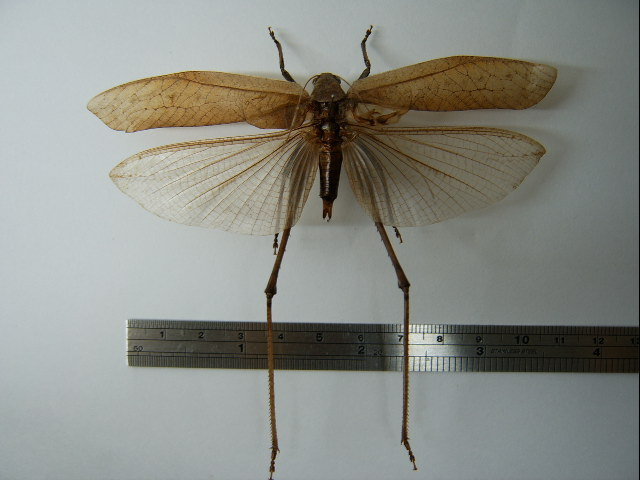
Mecopoda elongata

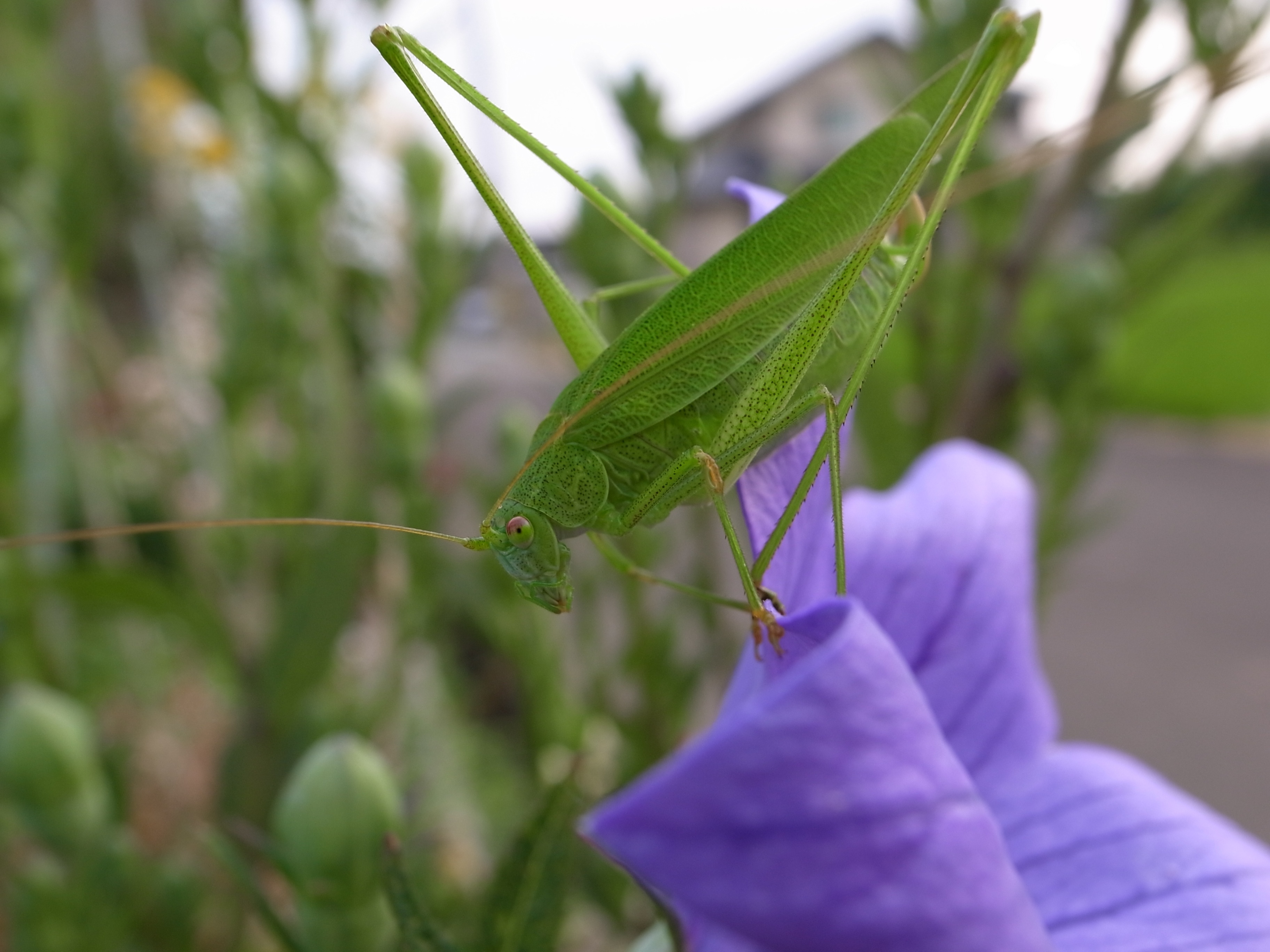
Mecopoda nipponensis
