= Aprosphylus hybridus =

Conservation status
- Least Concern (IUCN 3.1)

Scientific classification
- Kingdom: Animalia
- Phylum: Arthropoda
- Class: Insecta
- Order: Orthoptera
- Suborder: Ensifera
- Family: Tettigoniidae
- Genus: Aprosphylus
- Species: A. hybridus

Binomial name
- Aprosphylus hybridus (Pictet, 1888)

Species of cricket-like animal

Aprosphylus hybridus, the Namibian black-kneed katydid, is a species of katydid that is endemic to southern Namibia.
