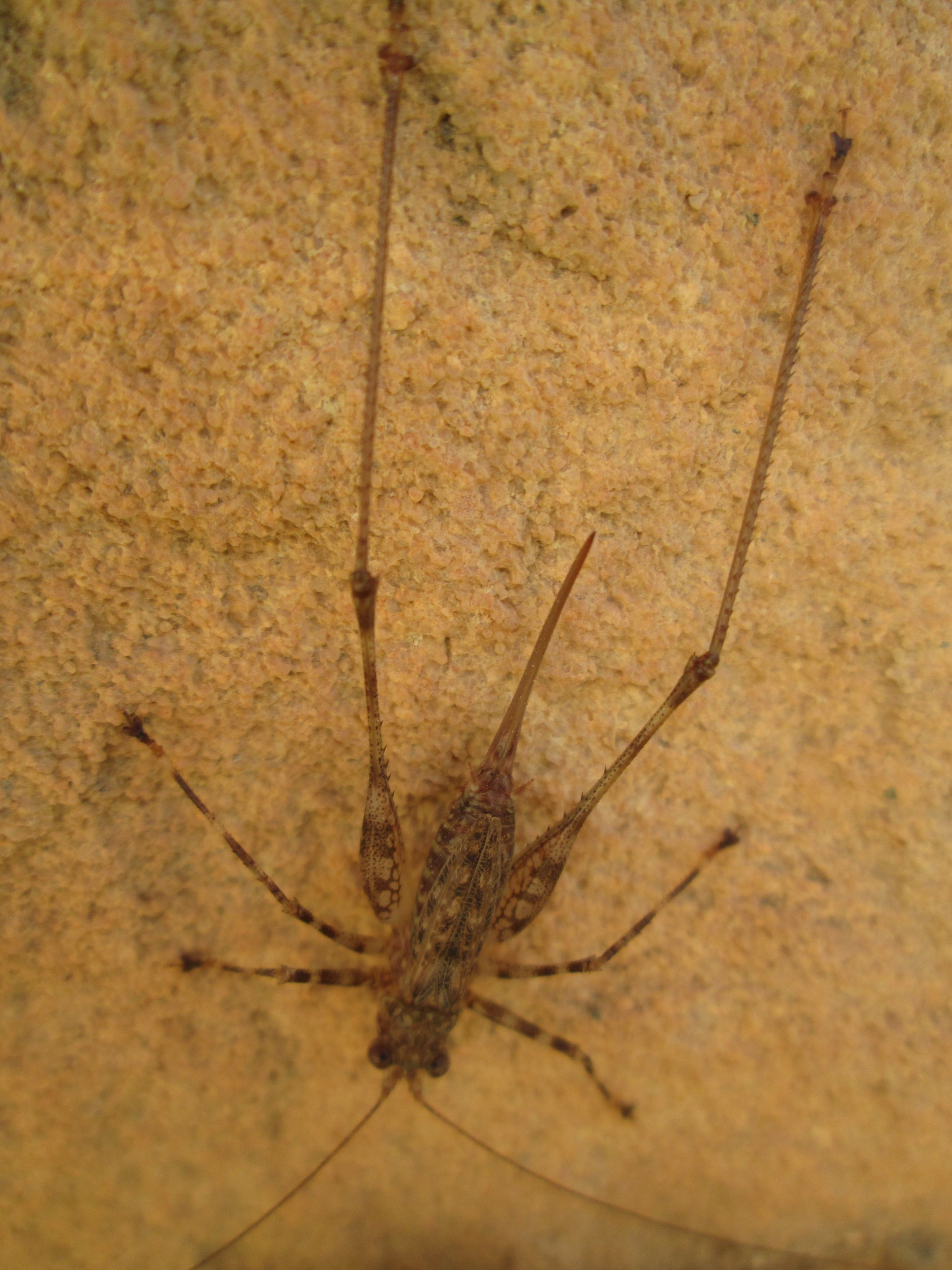

Conservation status
- Critically Endangered (IUCN 3.1)

Scientific classification
- Kingdom: Animalia
- Phylum: Arthropoda
- Class: Insecta
- Order: Orthoptera
- Suborder: Ensifera
- Family: Tettigoniidae
- Genus: Griffiniana
- Species: G. duplessisae

Binomial name
- Griffiniana duplessisae (Naskrecki & Bazelet, 2012)

= Griffiniana duplessisae =

Species of cricket-like animal

Griffiniana duplessisae, or Duplessis' agile katydid, is a species of katydid in the subfamily Phaneropterinae. It is endemic to Cederberg Mountains in South Africa.
