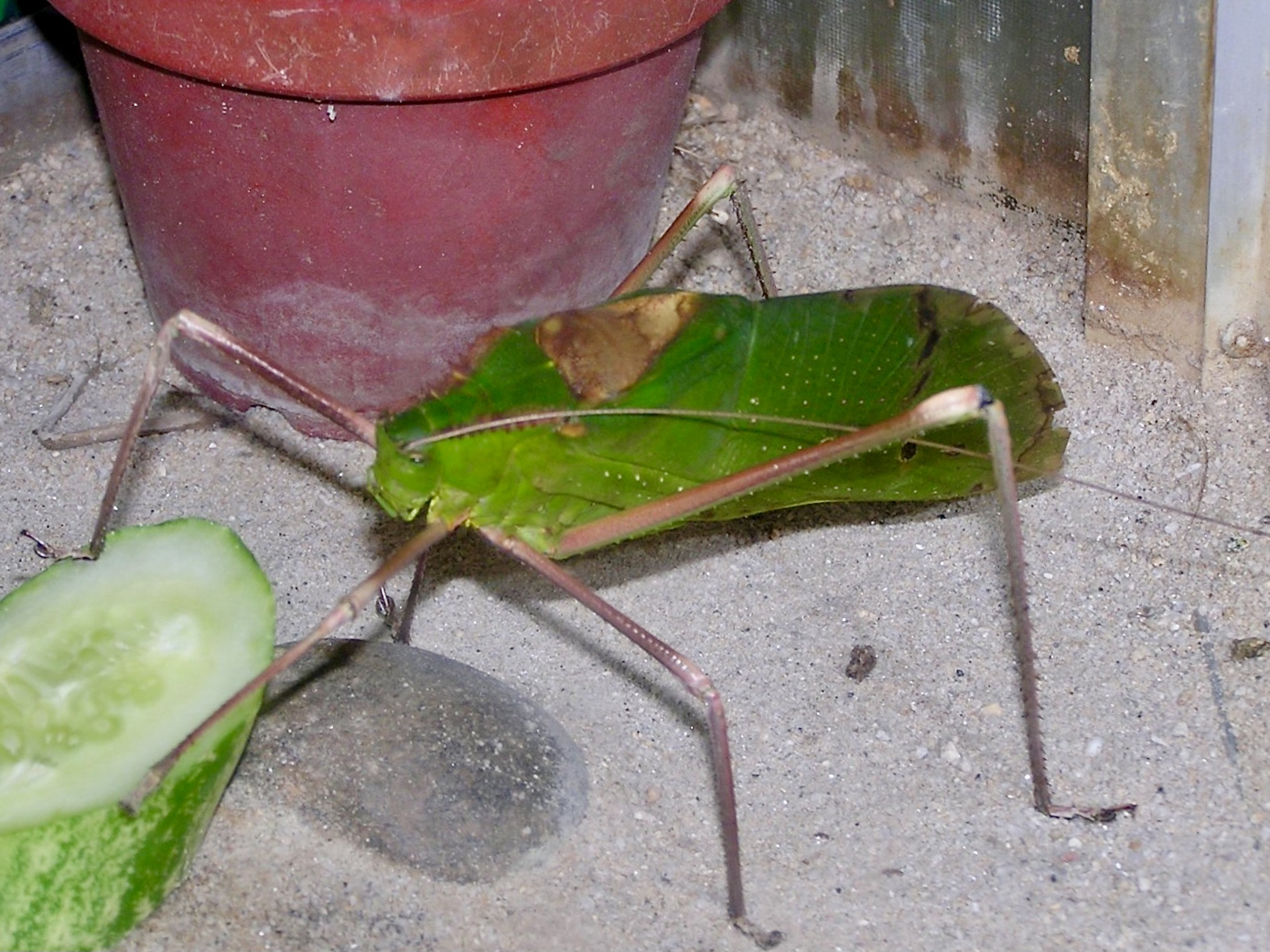
- Arachnacris corporalis

Scientific classification
- Kingdom: Animalia
- Phylum: Arthropoda
- Class: Insecta
- Order: Orthoptera
- Suborder: Ensifera
- Family: Tettigoniidae
- Tribe: Mecopodini
- Genus: Arachnacris; Giebel, 1861

Synonyms
- Macrolyristes Snellen van Vollenhoven, 1865

= Arachnacris =

Genus of cricket-like animals

Arachnacris is an Asian genus of large bush crickets in the sub-family Mecopodinae and tribe Mecopodini. They are found in tropical forest areas of Malesia.

== Species ==
The Orthoptera Species File lists:

1. Arachnacris amboinensis Donovan, 1800
2. Arachnacris corporalis Karny, 1924
3. Arachnacris regalis Karny, 1924
4. Arachnacris tenuipes Giebel, 1861 - type species (synonym A. imperator Snellen van Vollenhoven, 1865)
