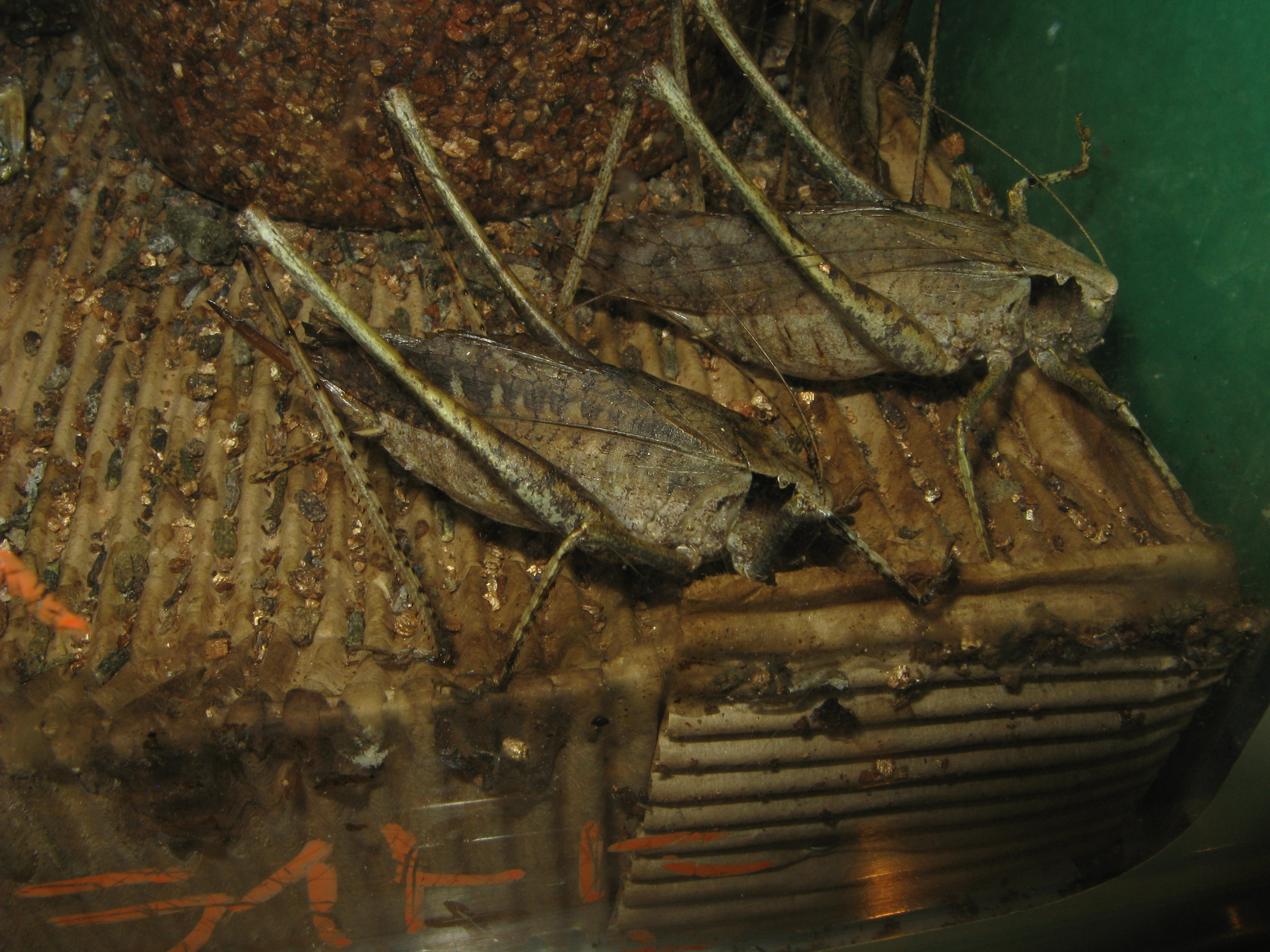

Scientific classification
- Kingdom: Animalia
- Phylum: Arthropoda
- Class: Insecta
- Order: Orthoptera
- Suborder: Ensifera
- Family: Tettigoniidae
- Subfamily: Mecopodinae
- Genus: Mecopoda
- Species: M. elongata

Binomial name
- Mecopoda elongata (Linnaeus, 1758)

Synonyms
- Gryllus elongatus Linnaeus, 1758

= Mecopoda elongata =

Species of cricket-like animal

Sound of Mecopoda elongata
Lab. recording by the BMNH

Mecopoda elongata is a species of bush cricket of the subfamily Mecopodinae. The species can be found in India.

== Subspecies ==
The Orthoptera Species File lists:

- M. elongata elongata (synonym M. elongata burmeisteri and others)
- M. elongata pallida

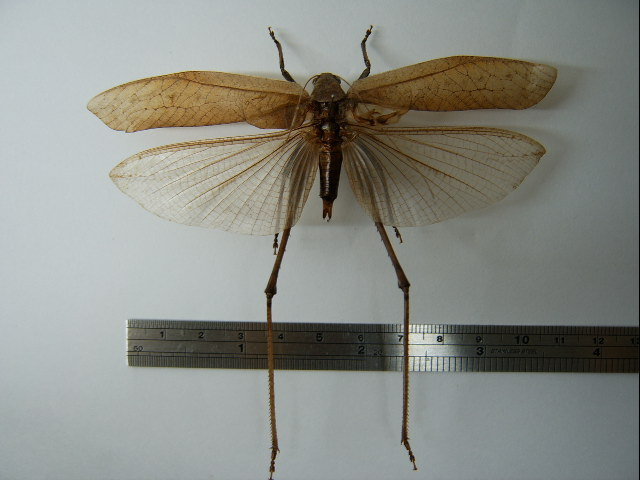
Museum specimen
