= Albertisiella acanthodiformis =

Scientific classification
- Domain: Eukaryota
- Kingdom: Animalia
- Phylum: Arthropoda
- Class: Insecta
- Order: Orthoptera
- Suborder: Ensifera
- Family: Tettigoniidae
- Subfamily: Mecopodinae
- Tribe: Sexavini
- Genus: Albertisiella; Griffini, 1908
- Species: A. acanthodiformis

Binomial name
- Albertisiella acanthodiformis (Brunner von Wattenwyl, 1898)

Species of cricket-like animal

Albertisiella acanthodiformis is a species of katydid native to the islands of West Nusa Tenggara to Maluku. It is the only species in the genus Albertisiella.
