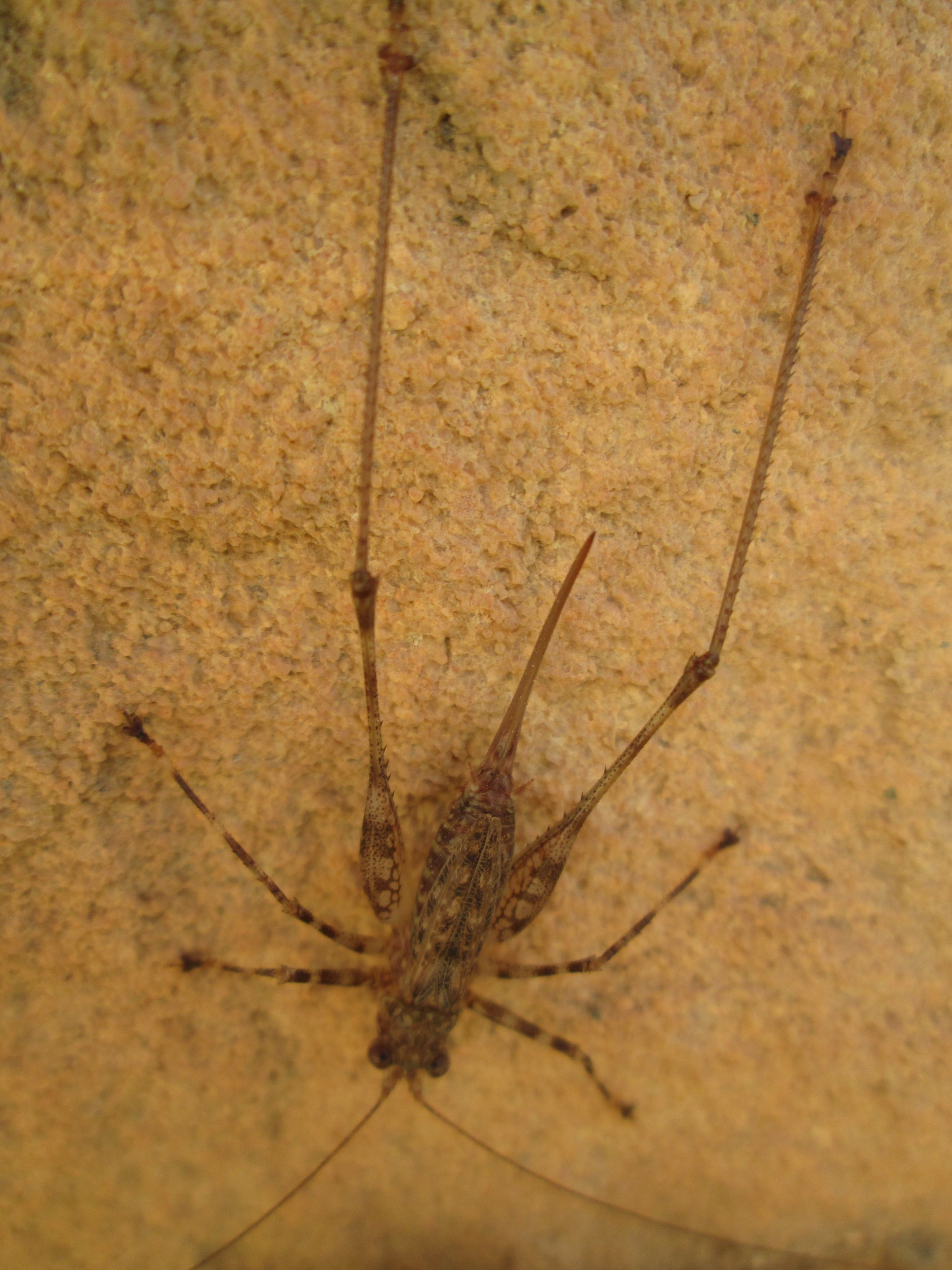
- Griffiniana duplessisae

Scientific classification
- Kingdom: Animalia
- Phylum: Arthropoda
- Class: Insecta
- Order: Orthoptera
- Suborder: Ensifera
- Family: Tettigoniidae
- Tribe: Aprosphylini
- Genus: Griffiniana; Karny, 1910

= Griffiniana =

Genus of insects

Griffiniana is a genus of crickets belonging to the family Tettigoniidae.

The species of this genus are found in Southern Africa.

Species:

- Griffiniana capensis Naskrecki, 1994
- Griffiniana duplessisae Naskrecki & Bazelet, 2012
- Griffiniana longipes (Naskrecki, 1994)
- Griffiniana pedestris Karny, 1910
