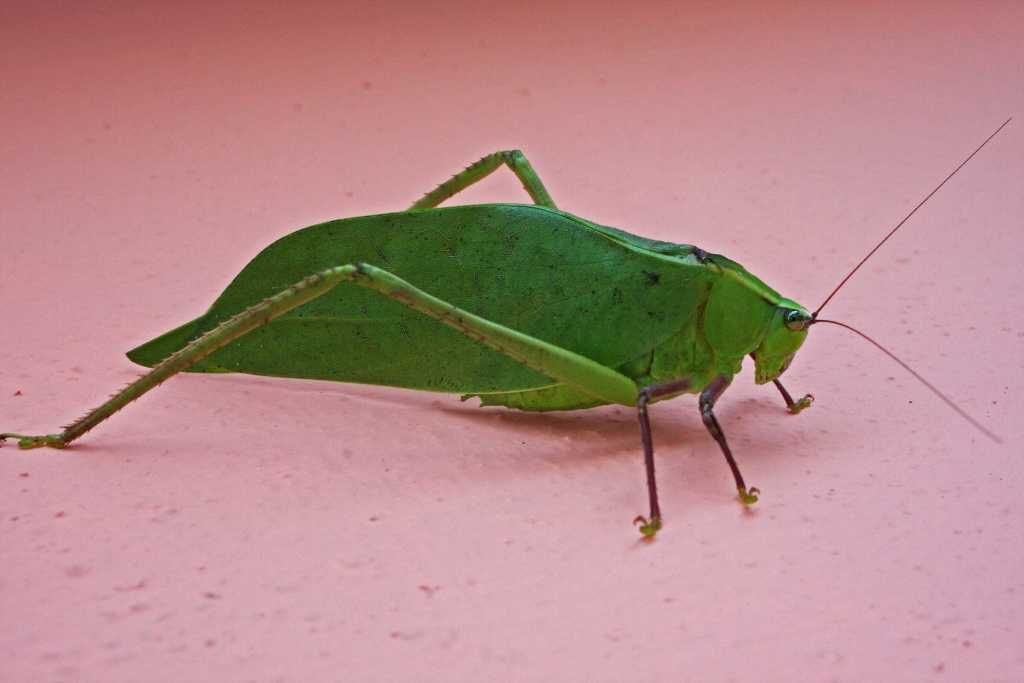
- Stilpnochlora couloniana

Scientific classification
- Kingdom: Animalia
- Phylum: Arthropoda
- Clade: Pancrustacea
- Class: Insecta
- Order: Orthoptera
- Suborder: Ensifera
- Family: Tettigoniidae
- Subfamily: Phaneropterinae
- Tribe: Steirodontini
- Genus: Stilpnochlora; Stål, 1873

= Stilpnochlora =

Genus of cricket-like animals

Stilpnochlora is a genus of phaneropterine katydids in the family Tettigoniidae, native to tropical and subtropical parts of the Americas. There are about 15 described species in Stilpnochlora.

They are relatively large, leaf-like katydids that are mostly green, between 5 and 10 cm (2–4 in) long depending on exact species, and females generally reach a larger size than males of the same species; S. couloniana is the largest katydid in the United States (no other member of the tribe Steirodontini occurs north of Mexico or the Caribbean islands). Although some species in this genus have features that allow for relatively easy identification, several are very similar and can only be distinguished after a careful examination of certain morphological details (their distributions are often useful, too). As far as known, Stilpnochlora and all other members of the tribe Steirodontini are entirely herbivorous.

== Species ==
These 15 species belong to the genus Stilpnochlora:

- Stilpnochlora azteca (Saussure, 1859)
- Stilpnochlora aztecoides Emsley, 1970
- Stilpnochlora couloniana (Saussure, 1861) (giant katydid)
- Stilpnochlora incisa Brunner von Wattenwyl, 1878
- Stilpnochlora laurifolia (Linnaeus, 1758)
- Stilpnochlora lineolata Emsley, 1970
- Stilpnochlora lineolatoides Emsley, 1970
- Stilpnochlora marginella (Serville, 1838)
- Stilpnochlora marginoides Emsley, 1970
- Stilpnochlora nanna Emsley, 1970
- Stilpnochlora ovalifolia Saussure & Pictet, 1898
- Stilpnochlora quadrata (Scudder, S.H., 1869)
- Stilpnochlora rodgersae Emsley, 1970
- Stilpnochlora thoracica (Serville, 1831)
- Stilpnochlora undulata Emsley, 1970
