= Pomatonota =

Scientific classification
- Kingdom: Animalia
- Phylum: Arthropoda
- Class: Insecta
- Order: Orthoptera
- Suborder: Ensifera
- Family: Tettigoniidae
- Tribe: Pomatonotini; Willemse, 1961
- Genus: Pomatonota; Burmeister, 1838
- Species: P. dregii

Binomial name
- Pomatonota dregii Burmeister, 1838

Genus of cricket-like animals

Pomatonota is a monotypic genus of katydids; the sole species is Pomatonota dregii. It is the only genus and species in the tribe Pomatonotini within the subfamily Mecopodinae. Pomatonota dregii is found in southern Africa.
