= Karny =

Karny or Kárný is a surname. Notable people with the surname include:

- Heinrich Hugo Karny (1886–1939), Austrian entomologist
- Miroslav Kárný (1919–2001), Czech historian
