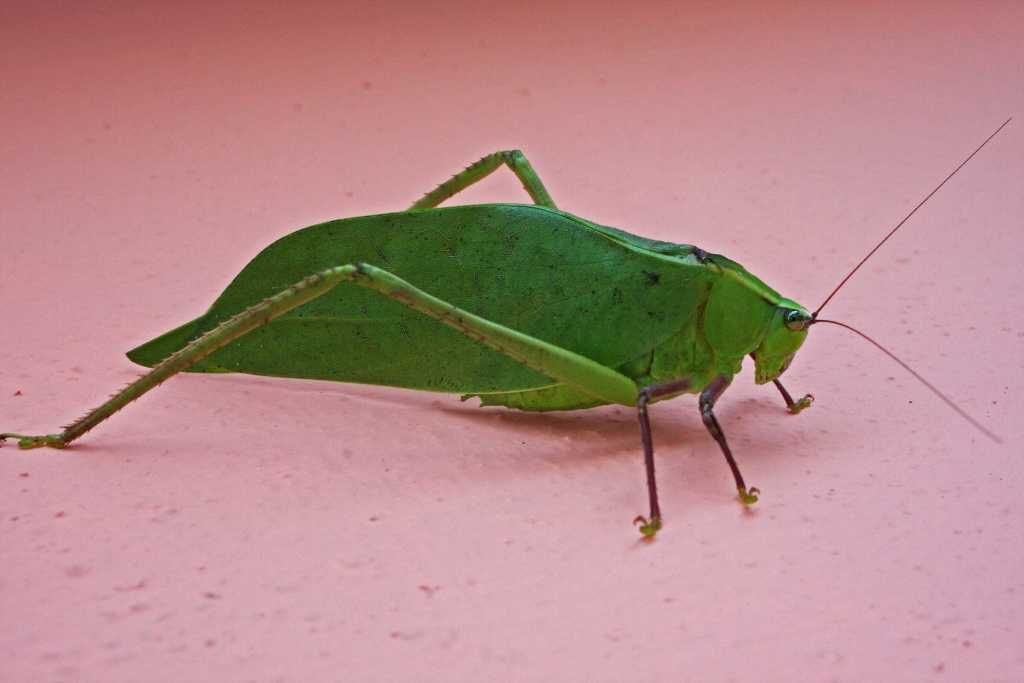

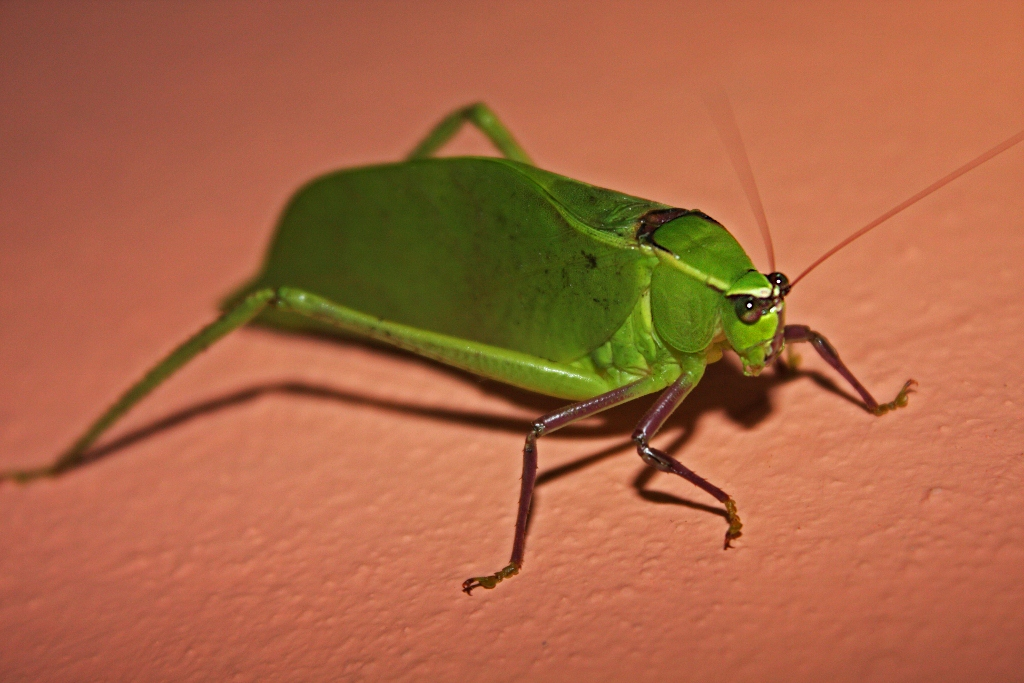
- Both in Cuba

Scientific classification
- Kingdom: Animalia
- Phylum: Arthropoda
- Clade: Pancrustacea
- Class: Insecta
- Order: Orthoptera
- Suborder: Ensifera
- Family: Tettigoniidae
- Subfamily: Phaneropterinae
- Genus: Stilpnochlora
- Species: S. couloniana

Binomial name
- Stilpnochlora couloniana (Saussure, 1861)

= Stilpnochlora couloniana =

Species of cricket-like animal

Stilpnochlora couloniana is a species of phaneropterine katydid in the family Tettigoniidae, native to Southeastern United States (Florida and Georgia; the only member of the Steirodontini in the U.S.), the Bahamas, and Cuba. It is known as the giant katydid (a name also used for some other species), and it is the largest katydid in the U.S., with an average length of 6.6 cm (2.6 in) in adult males and 7.8 cm (3.1 in) in adult females. Individuals from Cuba tend to grow 5–10% larger than those from the U.S. They are sometimes kept as pets.
