= Zacatula scabra =

Scientific classification
- Kingdom: Animalia
- Phylum: Arthropoda
- Class: Insecta
- Order: Orthoptera
- Suborder: Ensifera
- Family: Tettigoniidae
- Subfamily: Mecopodinae
- Genus: Zacatula; Walker, 1870
- Species: Z. scabra

Binomial name
- Zacatula scabra Walker, 1870

Species of insect

Zacatula is a monotypic genus of bush crickets in the subfamily Mecopodinae, containing the species Z. scabra, erected by Francis Walker in 1870 and found in eastern Indonesia.
