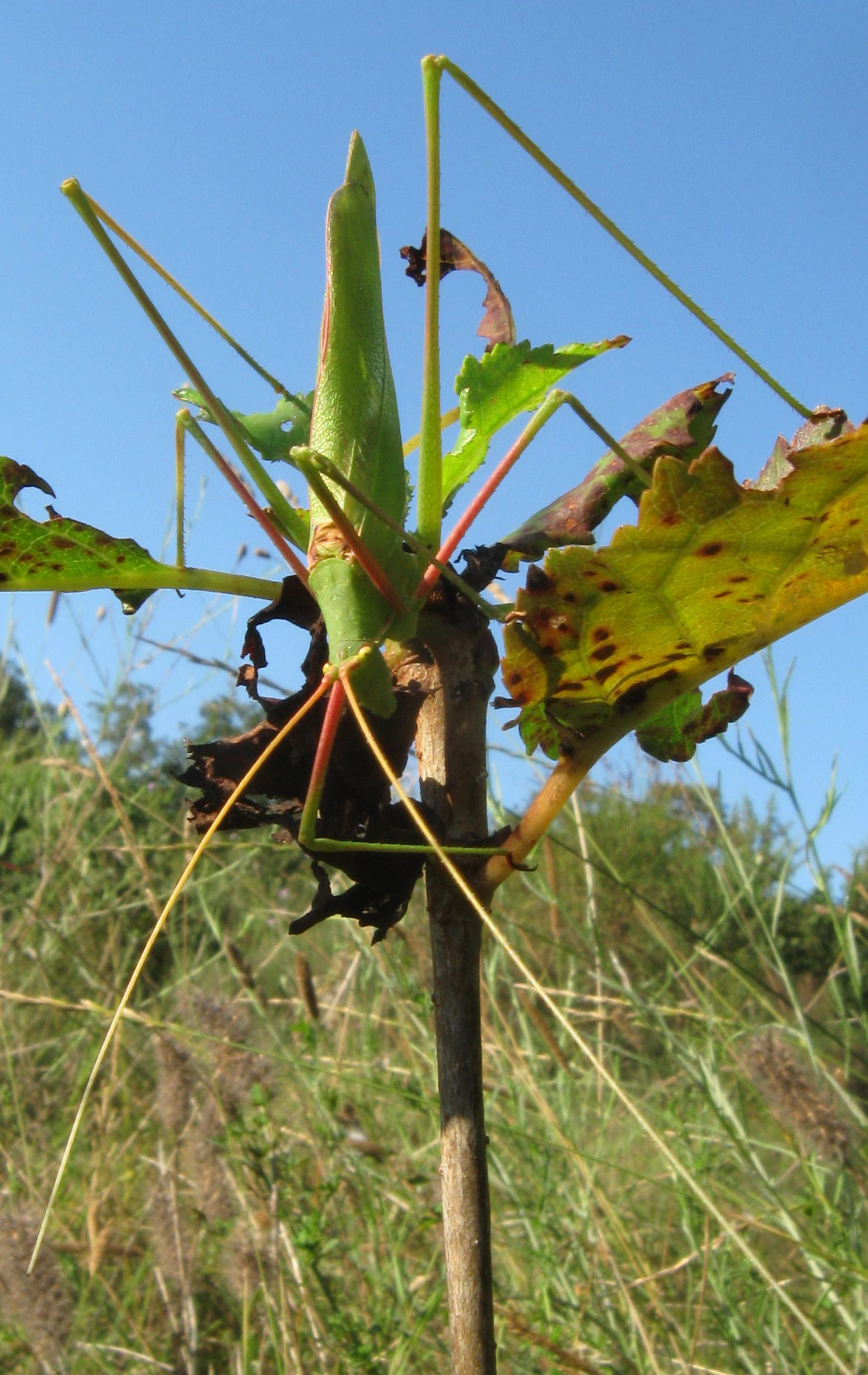
- Acrometopa servillea

Scientific classification
- Kingdom: Animalia
- Phylum: Arthropoda
- Class: Insecta
- Order: Orthoptera
- Suborder: Ensifera
- Family: Tettigoniidae
- Subfamily: Phaneropterinae
- Tribe: Acrometopini
- Genus: Acrometopa; Fieber, 1853

Type species
- Phaneroptera macropoda Burmeister, 1838

= Acrometopa =

Genus of cricket-like animals

Acrometopa is a genus of bush crickets in the subfamily Phaneropterinae; It is typical of the tribe Acrometopini (with about 8 other genera from Africa). Species in this genus are found in south-eastern Europe and the Middle East.

== Species ==
The Orthoptera Species File lists:

1. Acrometopa cretensis Ramme, 1927
2. Acrometopa italica Ramme, 1927
3. Acrometopa macropoda (Burmeister, 1838) - type species (as Phaneroptera macropoda)
4. Acrometopa servillea (Brullé, 1832)
5. Acrometopa syriaca Brunner von Wattenwyl, 1878
