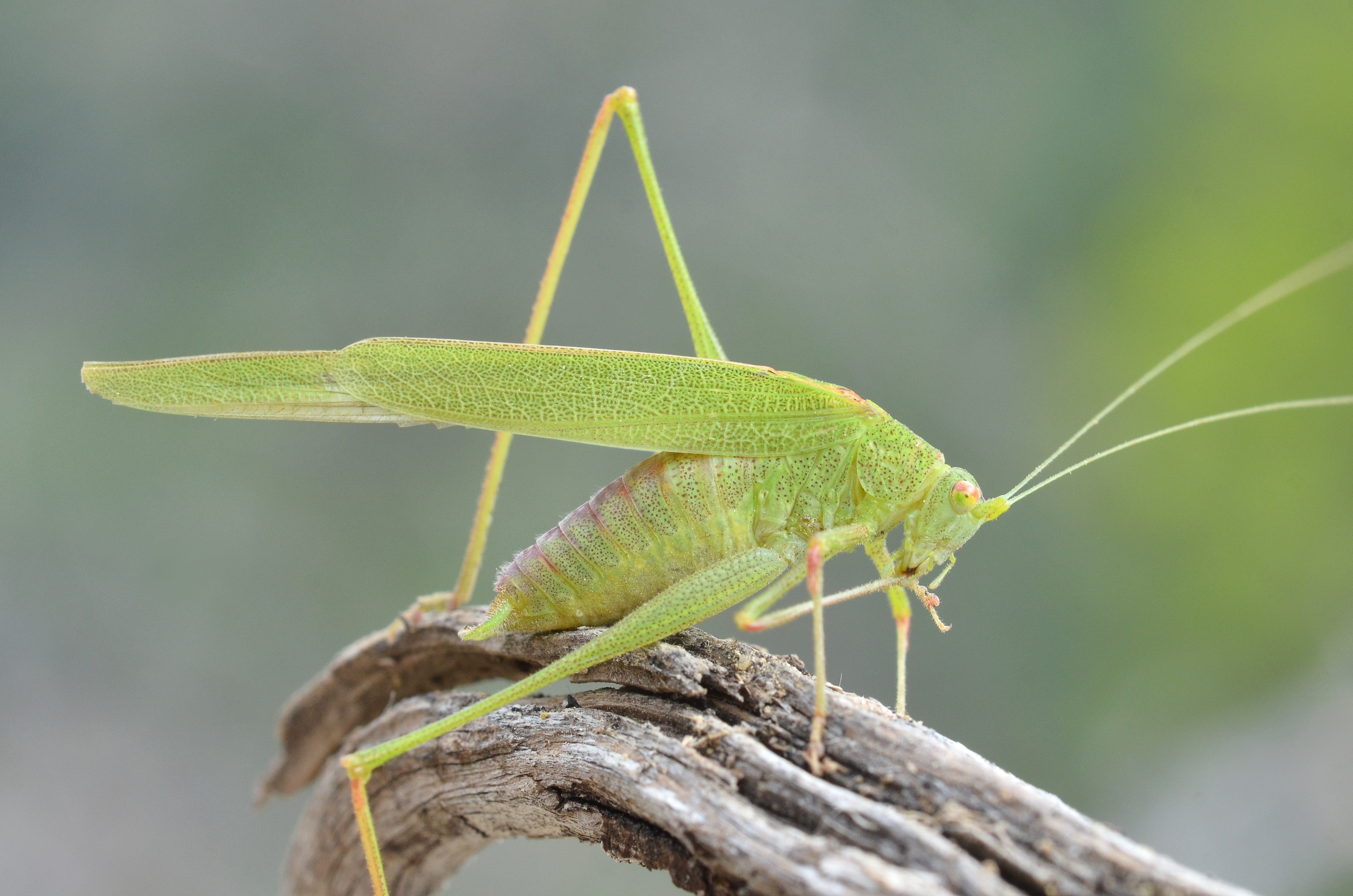
- Phaneroptera nana. Male
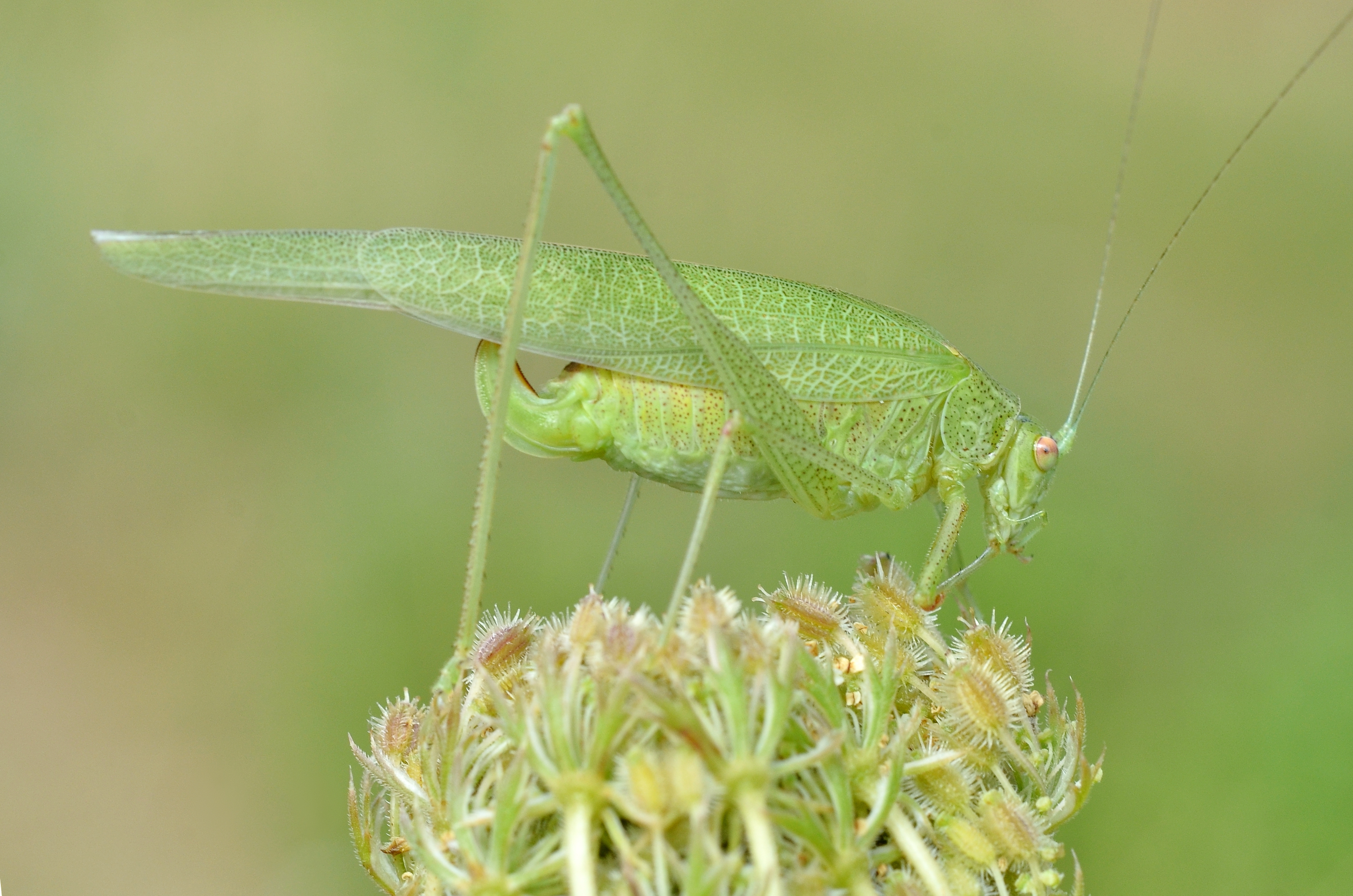
- Female

Scientific classification
- Kingdom: Animalia
- Phylum: Arthropoda
- Class: Insecta
- Order: Orthoptera
- Suborder: Ensifera
- Family: Tettigoniidae
- Subfamily: Phaneropterinae
- Tribe: Phaneropterini
- Genus: Phaneroptera
- Species: P. nana

Binomial name
- Phaneroptera nana Fieber, 1853

Synonyms
- Phaneroptera nana nana Fieber, 1853; Phaneroptera quadripunctata Brunner von Wattenwyl, 1878

= Phaneroptera nana =

Species of cricket-like animal

Close-Up of a Phaneroptera nana

Phaneroptera nana, common name southern sickle bush-cricket, is a species in the family Tettigoniidae and subfamily Phaneropterinae. It has become an invasive species in California where it may be called the Mediterranean katydid.

== Distribution and habitat ==
This bush cricket is native to mainland Europe, the Near East and North Africa. The Indo-Malayan species Phaneropera subcarinata, described by Bolívar, is morphologically similar to P. nana, and was classified under the P. nana name by Carl Brunner von Wattenwyl. As an invasive species, it has spread to the San Francisco Bay Area and may be widespread in the Los Angeles Basin, with records of its presence in California dating from at least 1952. In addition, it has been recorded in Portland, Oregon since 2015 and South America and hypothesized in the Annals of Carnegie Museum to have spread via shipping.

It mainly inhabits sunny and dry habitats, especially shrubs and low branches of trees.

== Description ==
The adult males grow up to 13–15 millimetres (0.51–0.59 in) long, while females can reach 15–18 millimetres (0.59–0.71 in) of length. In both sexes, the basic coloration of the body is light green, with many small black spots. The eyes are bright orange. In some individuals, there may be a brown dorsal stripe where the forewings (tegmina) meet, though the stripe does not extend onto the pronotum. The hindwings are longer than the tegmina, with the tegmina approximately three-fourths of the length of the hindwings. In some specimens, the tegmina reach the apex of the posterior femurs. In adult males, the cerci are prominent and curved, while in adult females, the ovipositor is about 5 millimetres (0.20 in) long and has the shape of a sickle.

P. nana and P. falcata are similar in appearance and may be confused for each other in parts of Europe, and elsewhere where the ranges of the two species overlap. These two species may be distinguished by the appearance of the male subgenital plate and the protonum. In P. nana, the male subgenital plate tapers near the end of the body, while in P. falcata, it diverges into two lobes. The protonum of P. nana is narrower than it is tall, while in P. falcata, the protonum is roughly the same width and length, if not longer than tall.

== Reproduction ==
The Mediterranean katydid (Phaneroptera nana) female sings in response to the male, prompting the male to move towards the female. This is unique to the species, because in other species of katydids, it is usually the female moving towards the male in response to hearing their chirps. However, because the females stay static while the males move to locate them, the females are at less risk of encountering threats and predators. However, the males will not decide to interact with a female unless they elicit a response within 60 milliseconds, ensuring that the female is close enough to them.

The females are selective of the males they respond to, and generally they prefer longer chirps. At least two chirps from the males are needed for the female to entertain the males and reply to them. However, more chirps than that from the males do not make the females more likely to duet with the males.

The female Mediterranean katydids lay their eggs in the lamina of plants. The female does this by bending her abdomen and chewing on the lamina to create an opening. The eggs she lays around 3mm in size on average. Those eggs usually hatch in summertime but that can vary. The timing means that P. nana is usually easily encountered through the summer and fall seasons.

== Diet ==
P. nana is known to cause damage in pear orchards, feeding on pears that have not ripened. In addition, it has been recorded to consume the pupae of L. botrana.

== Gallery ==
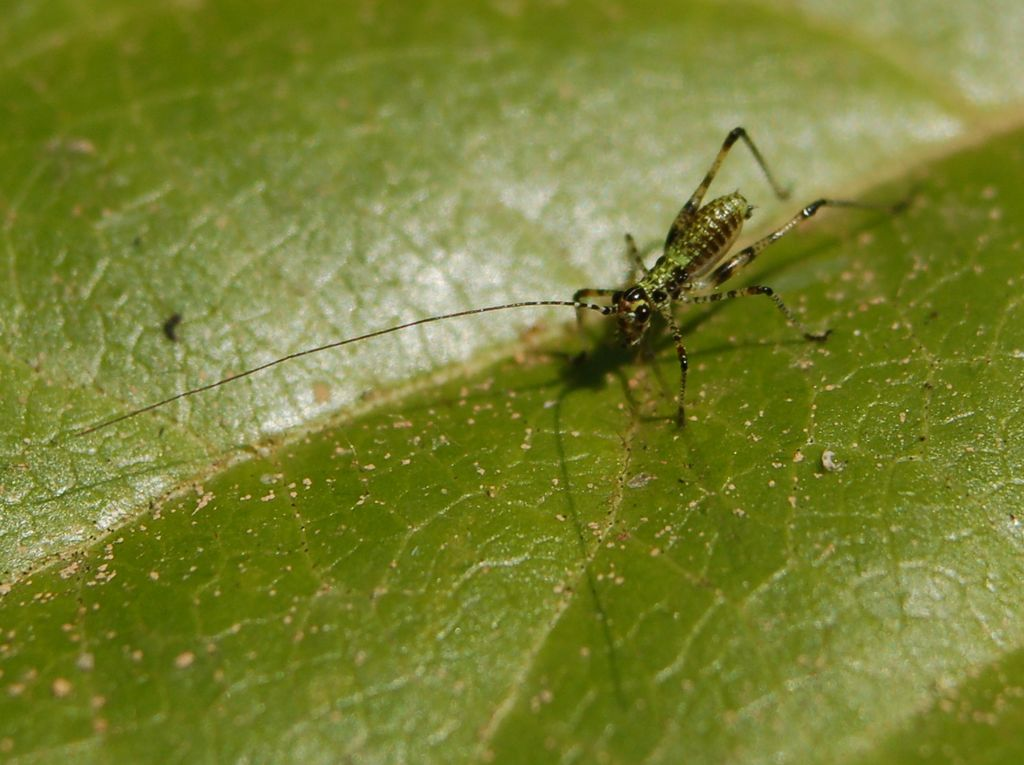
Phaneroptera nana, nymph

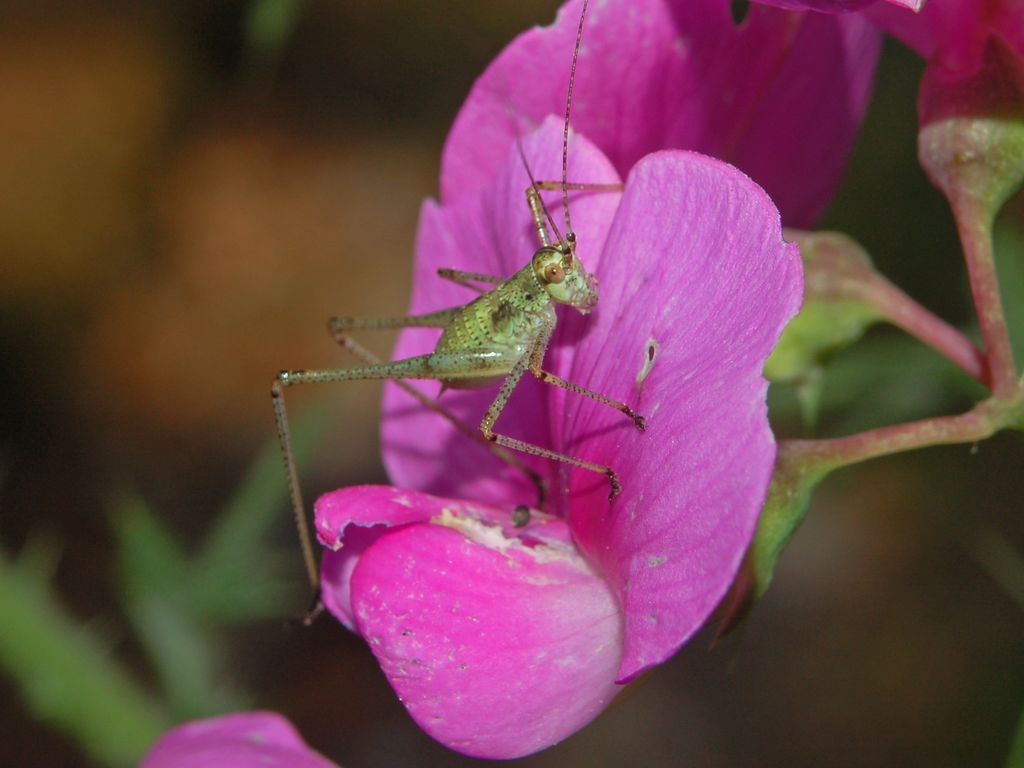
Phaneroptera cf. nana, nymph

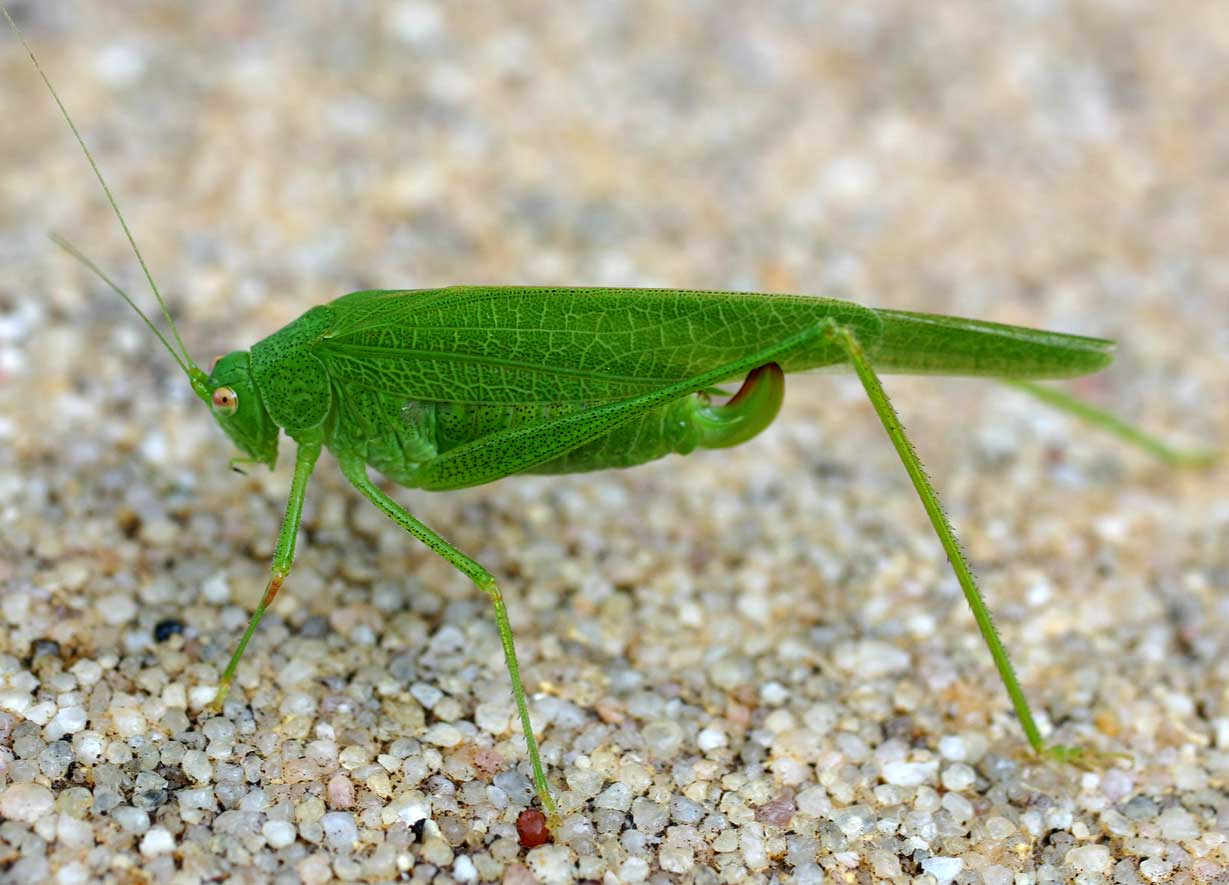
Phaneroptera nana, female

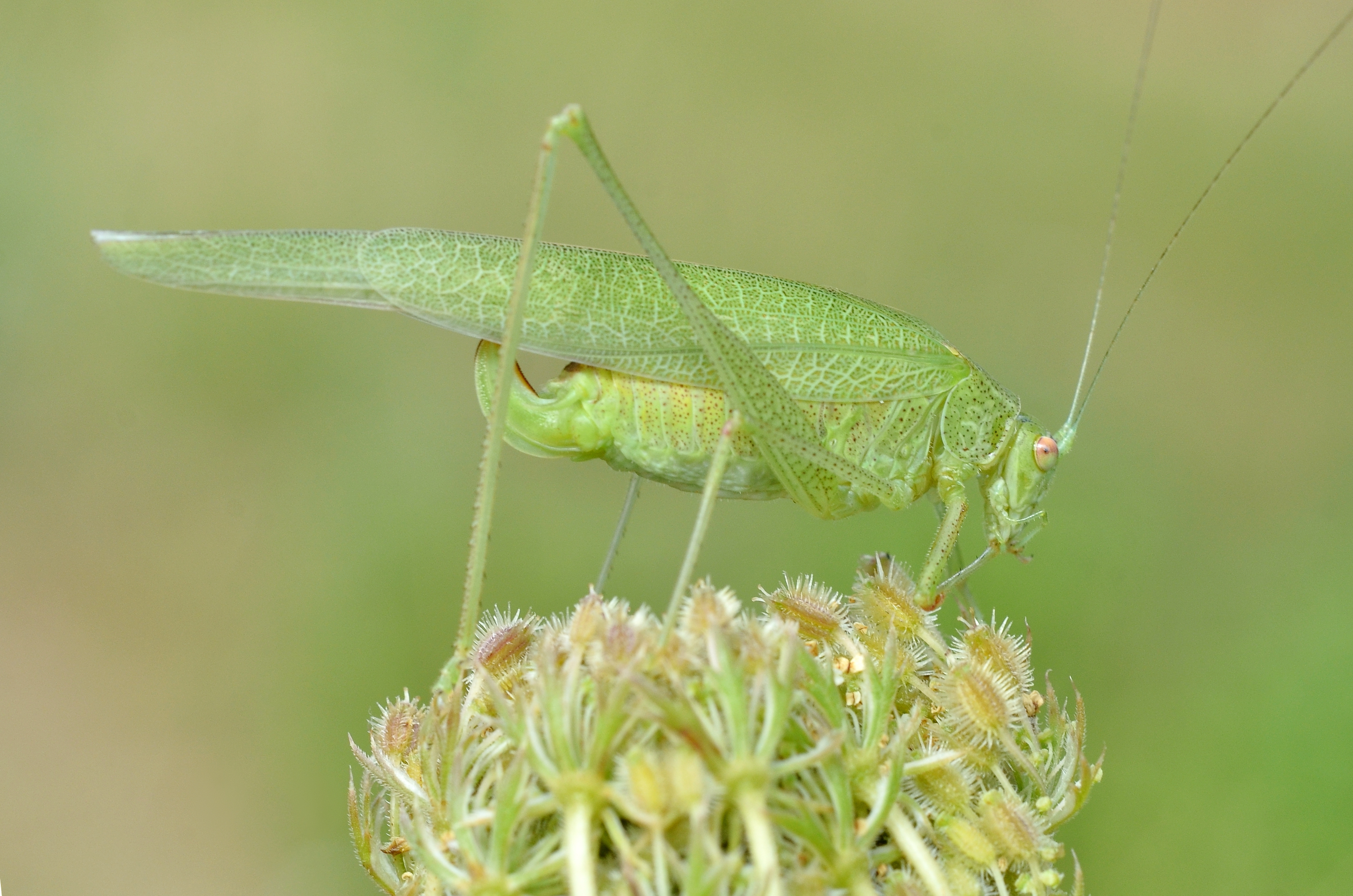
Phaneroptera nana, adult female grooming foreleg
