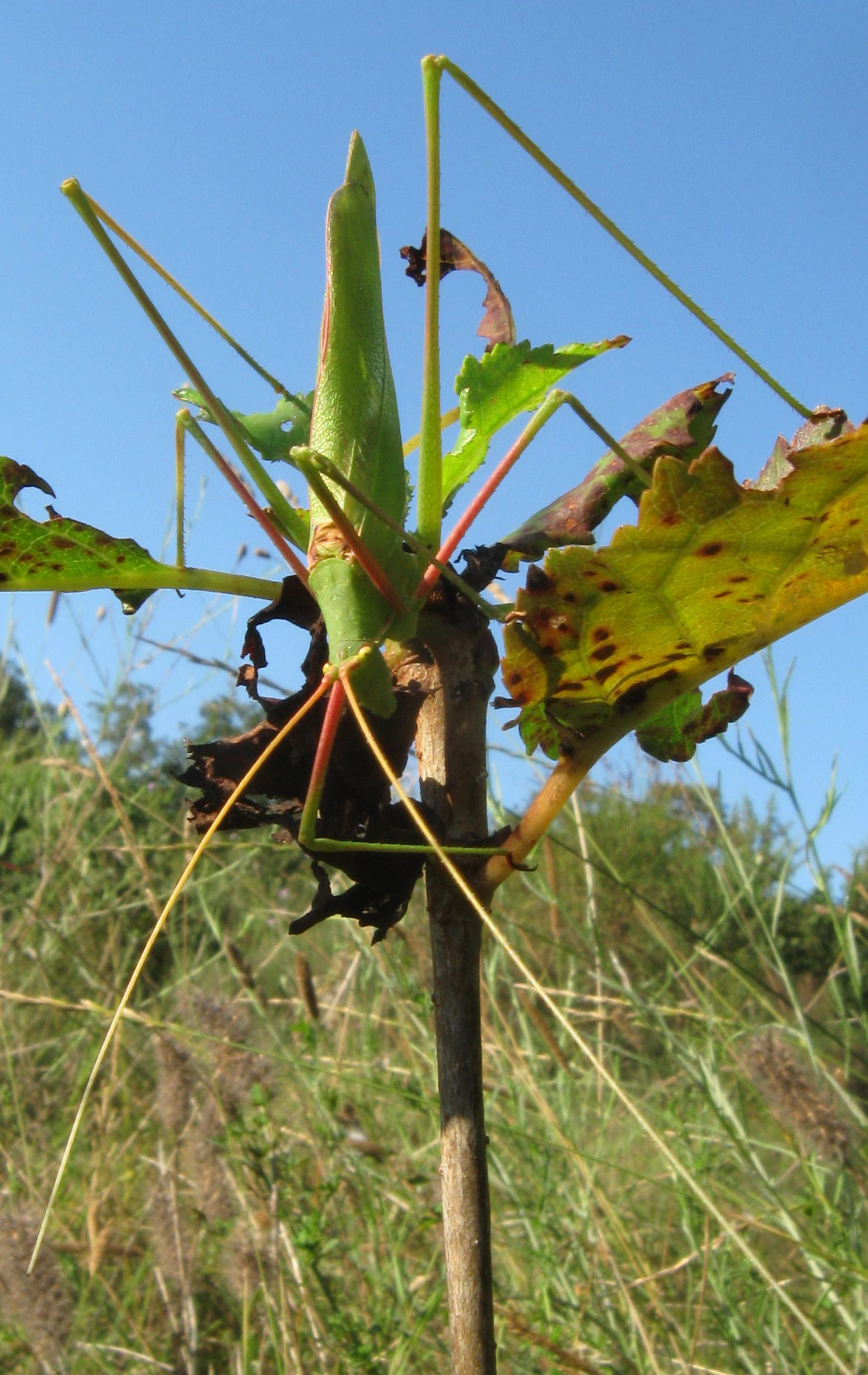

Scientific classification
- Kingdom: Animalia
- Phylum: Arthropoda
- Class: Insecta
- Order: Orthoptera
- Suborder: Ensifera
- Family: Tettigoniidae
- Subfamily: Phaneropterinae
- Genus: Acrometopa
- Species: A. macropoda

Binomial name
- Acrometopa macropoda (Burmeister, 1838)
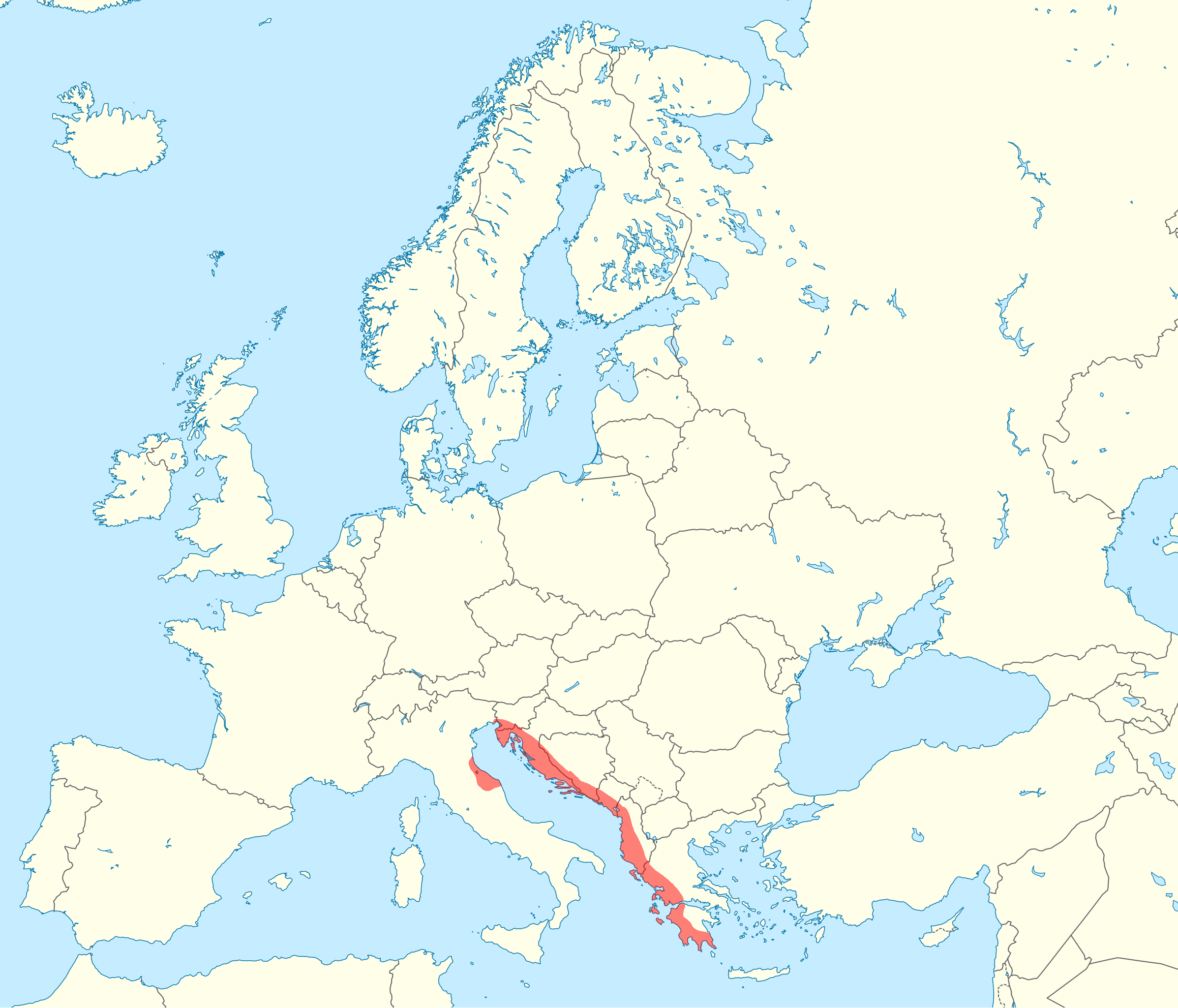

= Acrometopa macropoda =

Species of cricket-like animal

Video of a Acrometopa macropoda

Acrometopa macropoda is a species belonging to the family Tettigoniidae subfamily Phaneropterinae. It is found in southern Europe approximately from Trieste on both sides of the Adriatic coast - Italy and Yugoslavia and to the south Greece and the Dinaric Mountains . It prefers dry grasslands and wastelands with loose bushes or higher-growing plants, such as thistles . Taxonomy- may be a subspecies of Acrometopa servillea
