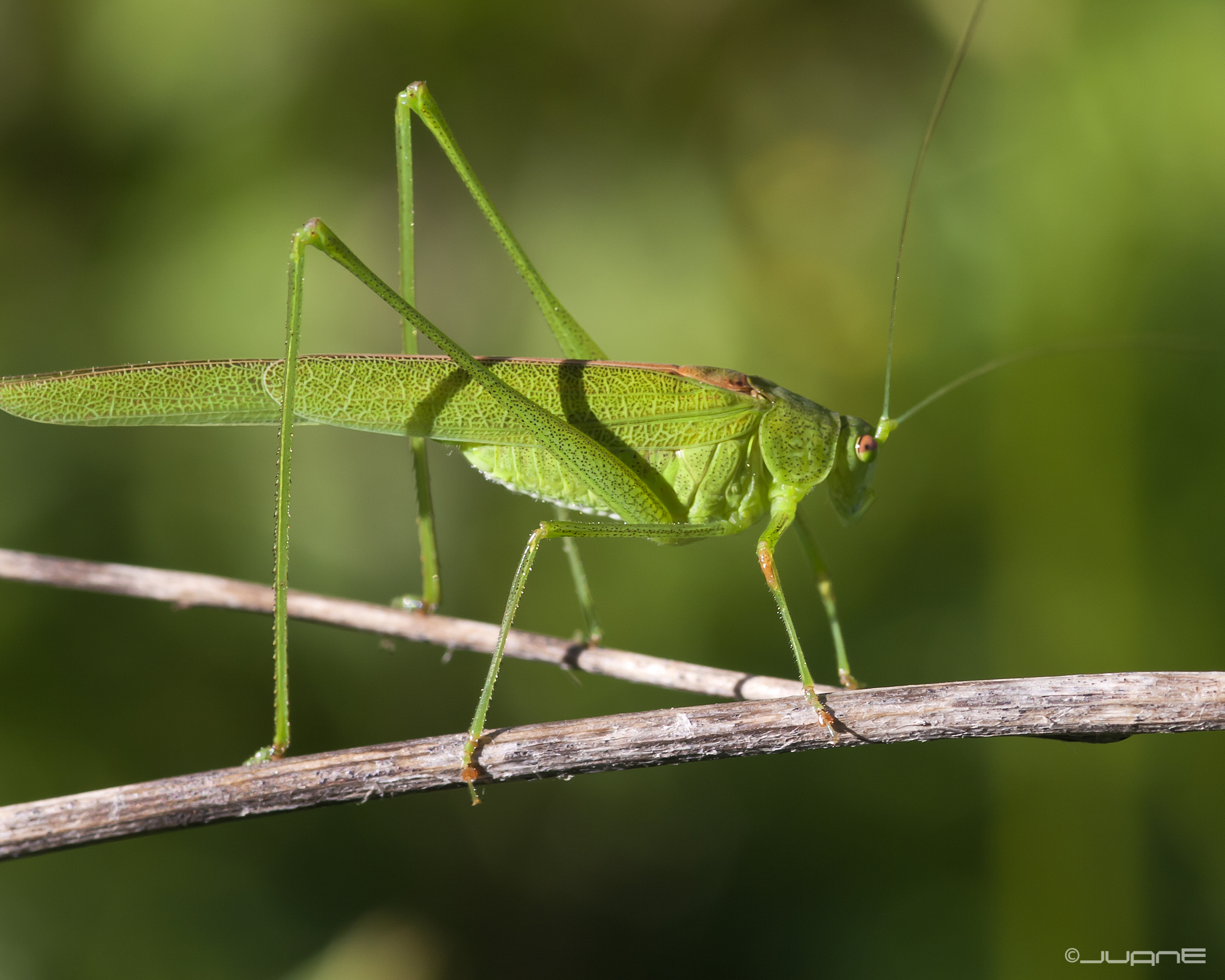
- Phaneroptera falcata, male
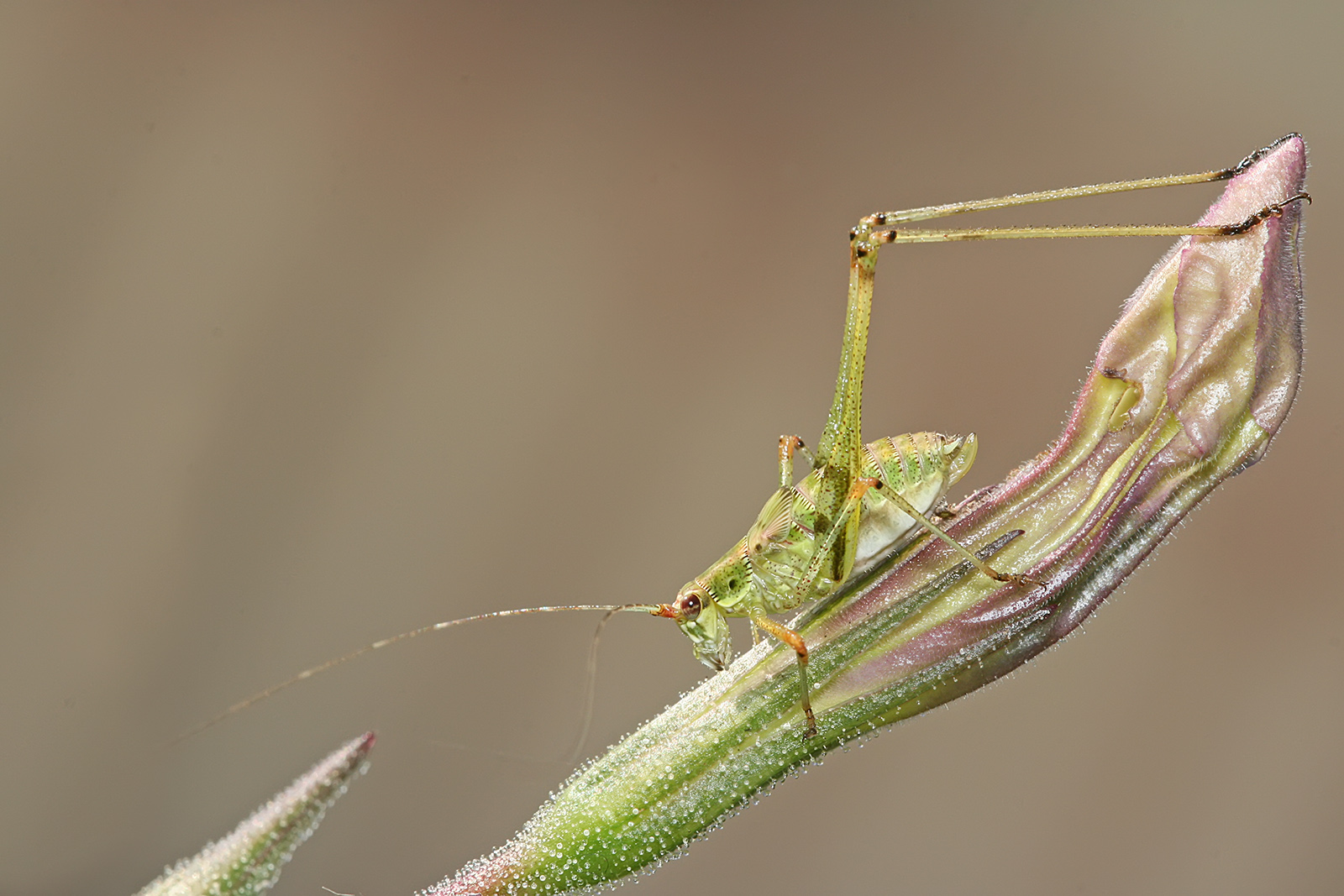
- Female Phaneroptera sp. nymph

Scientific classification
- Domain: Eukaryota
- Kingdom: Animalia
- Phylum: Arthropoda
- Class: Insecta
- Order: Orthoptera
- Suborder: Ensifera
- Family: Tettigoniidae
- Subfamily: Phaneropterinae
- Tribe: Phaneropterini
- Genus: Phaneroptera; Serville, 1831

Synonyms
- of subgenus Phaneroptera: Anerota Caudell, 1921; Dannfeltia Sjöstedt, 1902; Euanerota Karny, 1927; Paranerota Karny, 1926; Phanernotera Liu, 2011

= Phaneroptera =

Genus of cricket-like animals

Phaneroptera is an Old World genus of bush crickets in the family Tettigoniidae and is the type genus of the subfamily Phaneropterinae. It was described by Jean Guillaume Audinet-Serville in 1831, and the species are recorded from Europe, Africa and Asia.

== Species ==
The Orthoptera Species File lists:

subgenus Erdemia Koçak & Kemal, 2009

- Phaneroptera erdemi Koçak & Kemal, 2009
- Phaneroptera hackeri Harz, 1988

subgenus Phaneroptera Serville, 1831

- Phaneroptera acaciae Chopard, 1954
- Phaneroptera albida Walker, 1869
- Phaneroptera brevicauda Liu, 2011
- Phaneroptera brevis (Serville, 1838)
- Phaneroptera celebica (Haan, 1842)
- Phaneroptera cleomis Ayal, Broza & Pener, 1974
- Phaneroptera cretacea Uvarov, 1929
- Phaneroptera curvata (Willemse, C., 1942)
- Phaneroptera darevskii Bei-Bienko, 1966
- Phaneroptera dentata (Willemse, C., 1942)
- Phaneroptera falcata (Poda, 1761) - the sickle-bearing bush-cricket, from Europe and temperate Asia, this is the type species (originally as Gryllus falcata Poda)
- Phaneroptera fragilis Ragge, 1960
- Phaneroptera furcifera Stål, 1861
- Phaneroptera gracilis Burmeister, 1838
- Phaneroptera guineana Steinmann, 1966
- Phaneroptera hordeifolia (Haan, 1842)
- Phaneroptera jordanica Steinmann, 1966
- Phaneroptera longicauda (Willemse, C., 1942)
- Phaneroptera longispina Ragge, 1956
- Phaneroptera maculosa Ragge, 1956
- Phaneroptera magna Ragge, 1956
- Phaneroptera minima Brunner von Wattenwyl, 1878
- Phaneroptera myllocerca Ragge, 1956
- Phaneroptera nana Fieber, 1853
- Phaneroptera neglecta (Karny, 1926)
- Phaneroptera nigroantennata Brunner von Wattenwyl, 1878
- Phaneroptera nigropunctata Chopard, 1955
- Phaneroptera okinawensis Ichikawa, 2001
- Phaneroptera parva Ragge, 1956
- Phaneroptera phantasma Steinmann, 1966
- Phaneroptera rintjana Bei-Bienko, 1966
- Phaneroptera sparsa Stal, 1857
- Phaneroptera spinifera (Willemse, C., 1953)
- Phaneroptera spinosa Bei-Bienko, 1954
- Phaneroptera trigonia Ragge, 1957
