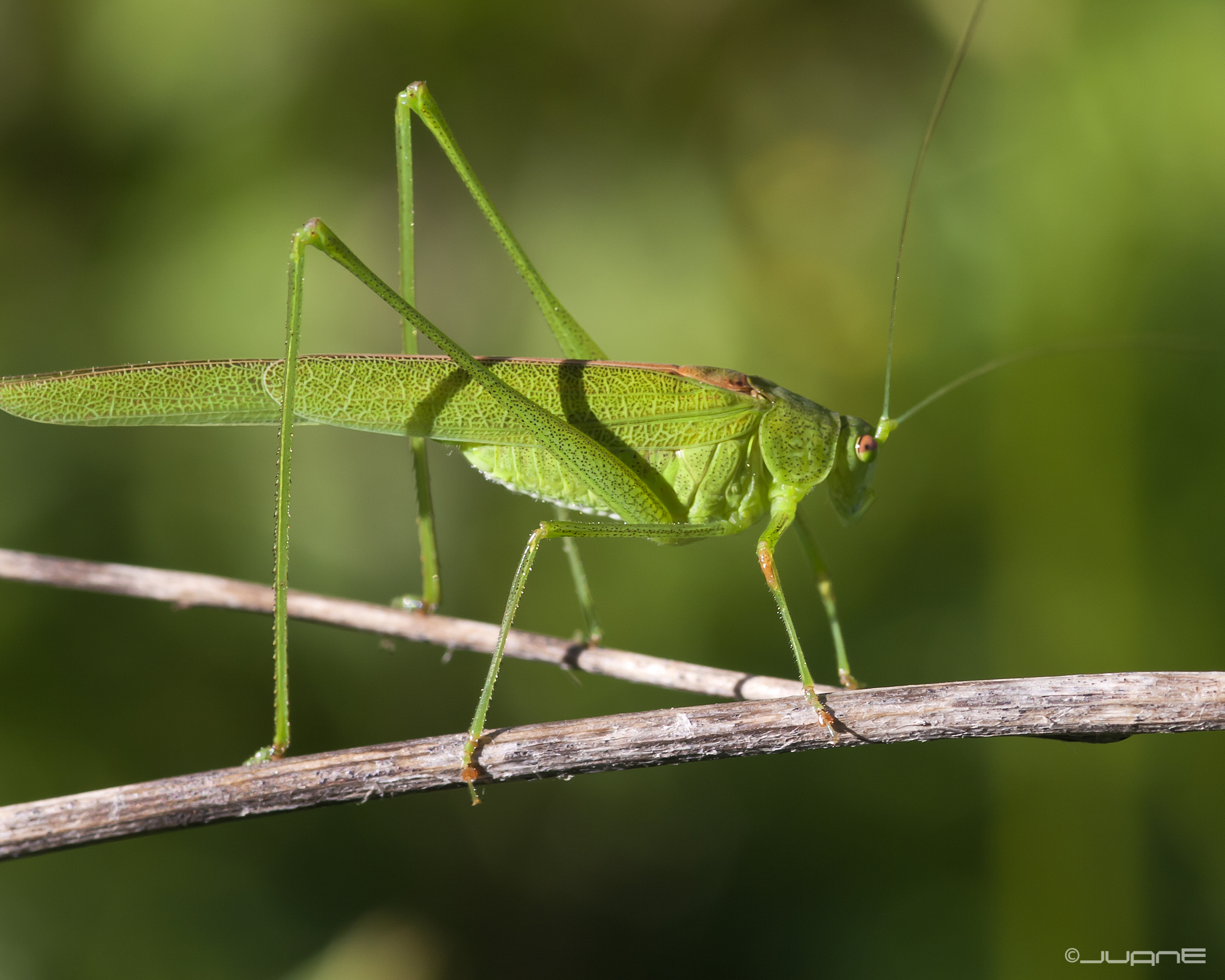
- Male
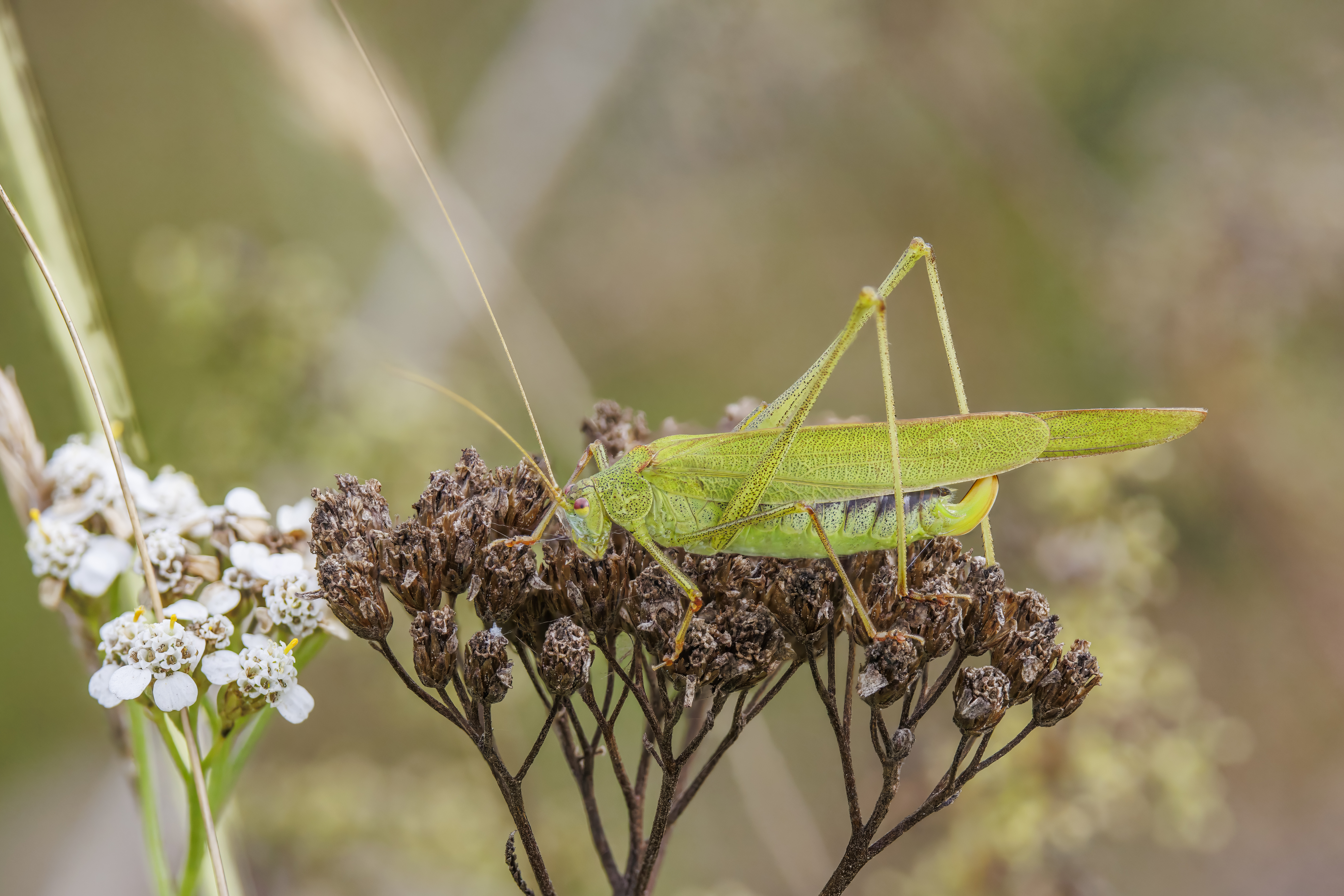
- Female

Scientific classification
- Kingdom: Animalia
- Phylum: Arthropoda
- Class: Insecta
- Order: Orthoptera
- Suborder: Ensifera
- Family: Tettigoniidae
- Subfamily: Phaneropterinae
- Genus: Phaneroptera
- Species: P. falcata

Binomial name
- Phaneroptera falcata Poda, 1761

Synonyms
- Locusta libellula (Stoll, 1787); Decticus phyllopteroides (Fischer von Waldheim, 1846); Phaneroptera sinensis Uvarov, 1933

= Phaneroptera falcata =

Species of cricket-like animal

Sound of Phaneroptera falcata
Field recording in the Netherlands 26s

Phaneroptera falcata, the sickle-bearing bush-cricket, is a species of orthopteran belonging to the subfamily Phaneropterinae. It is mostly herbivorous and commonly measures 24 to 36 mm long. It lives mainly in warm scrub and grasslands areas, also on dry shrubbery and in sand pits and gardens.

Close-Up of a Phaneroptera falcata

== Distribution ==
Phaneroptera falcata occurs in Europe and has historically been restricted to southern and central parts of the continent. They are absent in the Alpine foothills and in many parts of the Swabian Alps. Phaneroptera falcata has been extending the northern limits of its range in mainland Europe in recent decades; it is now regular in parts of southernmost Scandinavia, despite only spreading to the region quite recently (first record in Denmark in 2010 and in Sweden in 2014). Vagrant adults are occasionally found in Britain, and a small, but apparently established, colony was discovered near Dungeness in Kent in 2015.
