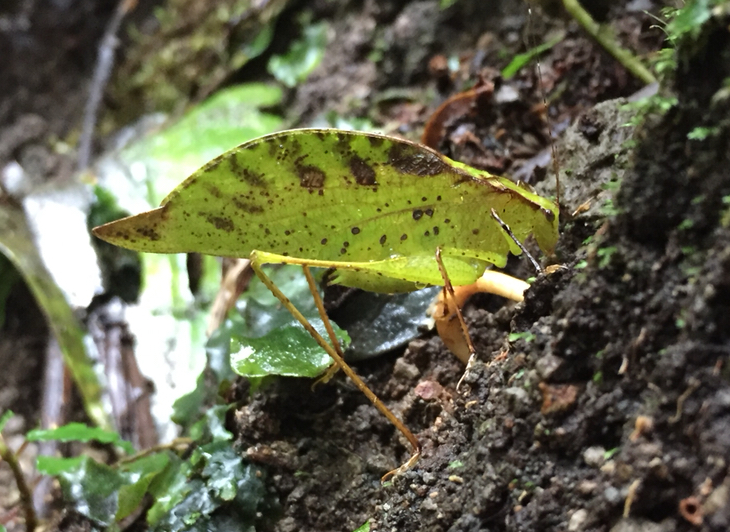
- Orophus tessellatus

Scientific classification
- Kingdom: Animalia
- Phylum: Arthropoda
- Clade: Pancrustacea
- Class: Insecta
- Order: Orthoptera
- Suborder: Ensifera
- Family: Tettigoniidae
- Subfamily: Phaneropterinae
- Tribe: Amblycoryphini
- Genus: Orophus; Saussure, 1859

Type species
- Phylloptera mexicana Saussure, 1859

Synonyms
- Anepsia Brunner von Wattenwyl, 1878; Paragenes Saussure & Pictet, 1897; Sagona Walker, 1869

= Orophus =

Genus of cricket-like animals

Orophus is a small genus of katydids native to Mexico, Central America, and South America.

== Description and habitat ==
Katydids in this genus have an elongated head with ovoid eyes. The ovipositor is medium-sized, slightly crenulated, curving upwards, and one fifth of the length of the posterior femur. They are found in the understory rather than in the canopy in contrast with other members of the subfamily Phaneropterinae.

== Taxonomy ==
The group was originally named in 1859 by Swiss entomologist Henri Louis Frédéric de Saussure as a subgenus of Phylloptera. It was erected as a separate genus in 1869 by British entomologist Francis Walker. It is in the tribe Amblycoryphini within the subfamily Phaneropterinae. The type species is Orophus mexicanus (originally Phylloptera mexicana). Other genera with species previously placed in Orophus include Eurycorypha and Microcentrum.

As of 2019, the genus includes seven species split into three species groups:

Species group Orophus mexicanus

Species in this group are light green to yellowish in coloration.

- Orophus amazonicus Cadena-Castañeda, 2014 – Colombia
- Orophus guatemalae (Saussure & Pictet, 1897) – Central America
- Orophus mexicanus (Saussure, 1859) – Mexico, Central America

Species group Orophus ovatus

This species group has variable coloration.

- Orophus ovatus (Brunner von Wattenwyl, 1878) – Costa Rica

Species group Orophus tessellatus

Species in this group are quite variable in their coloration and the density of the spots on the forewings, ranging from light to dark green, yellow, pink, or brown.

- Orophus andinus Cadena-Castañeda, 2014 – Colombia
- Orophus conspersus (Brunner von Wattenwyl, 1878) – Central America and northern South America
- Orophus tessellatus (Saussure, 1861) – Mexico, Central America, and South America
