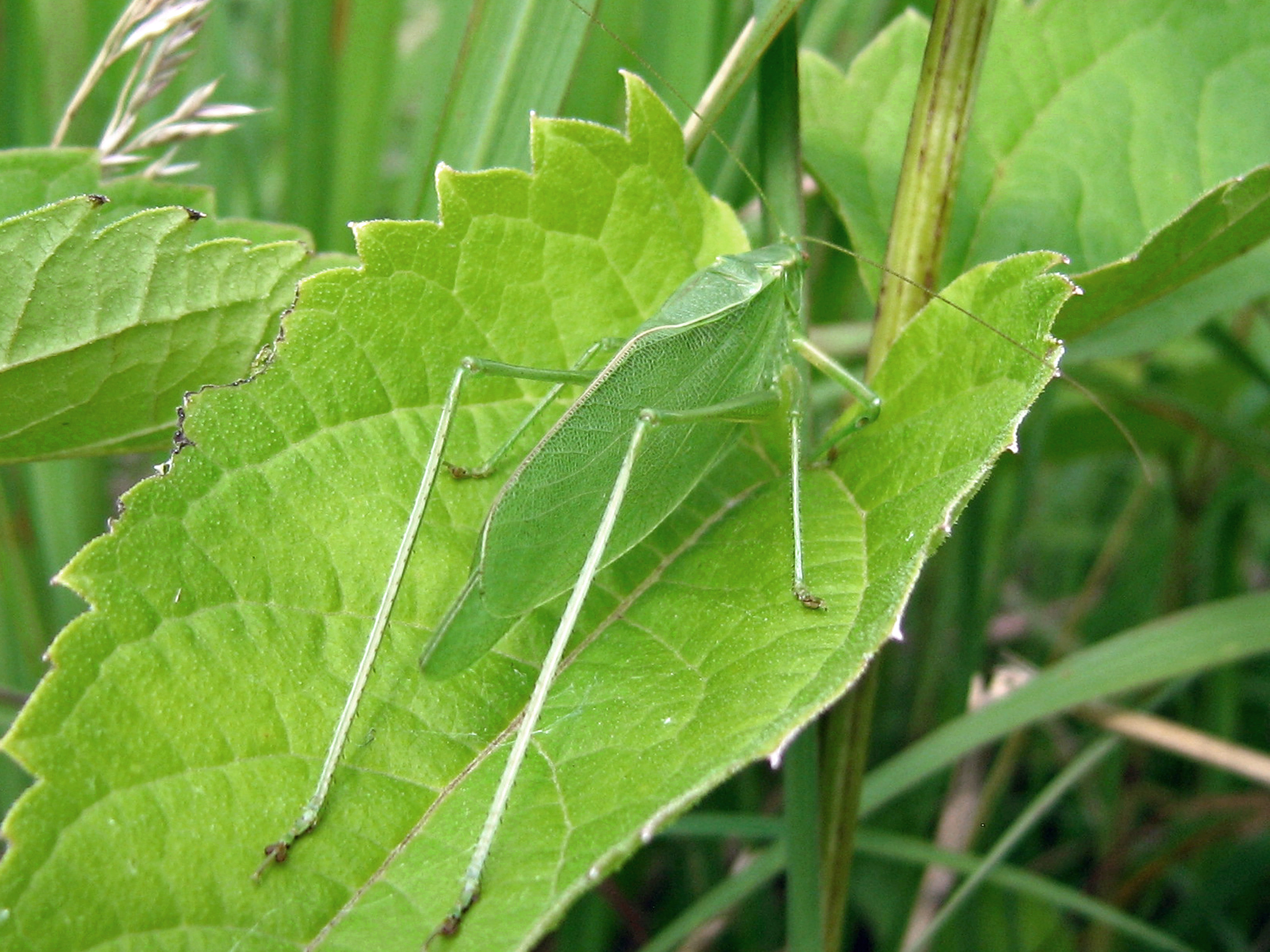

Scientific classification
- Kingdom: Animalia
- Phylum: Arthropoda
- Clade: Pancrustacea
- Class: Insecta
- Order: Orthoptera
- Suborder: Ensifera
- Family: Tettigoniidae
- Subfamily: Phaneropterinae
- Genus: Microcentrum
- Species: M. rhombifolium

Binomial name
- Microcentrum rhombifolium (Saussure, 1859)

= Microcentrum rhombifolium =

Species of cricket-like insect

Microcentrum rhombifolium is a species of insect in the family Tettigoniidae. Common names include greater angle-wing katydid, broad-winged katydid, and angular-winged katydid. They live across North America in trees and shrubs. Adults are active in late summer and autumn and have a "ticking" call. They have been reported to chew on the peels of citrus crops, resulting in minor damage.

== Description ==
Microcentrum rhombifolium have a green, leaf-like appearance with long, threadlike antennae and feet divided into four segments. Adults reach 50–65 millimetres (2.0–2.6 in) in length and are rhombus-shaped.

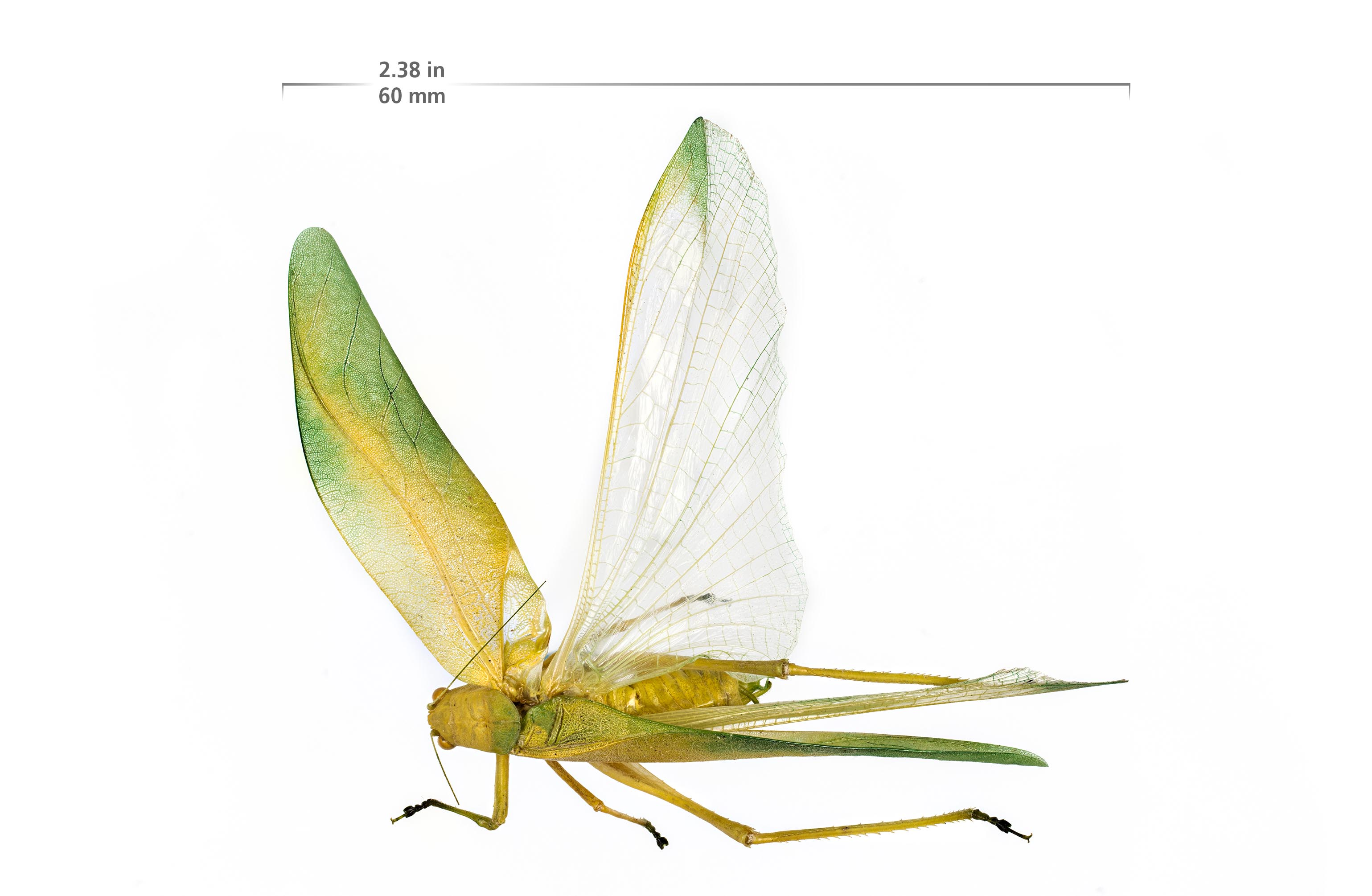

M. rhombifolium looks similar to M. retinerve, but the two species may be distinguished by the shape of their pronota. In M. rhombifolium, the front edge of the pronotum has a small bump in the middle. M. retinerve does not have this bump.
