= Microcentrum californicum =

Scientific classification
- Domain: Eukaryota
- Kingdom: Animalia
- Phylum: Arthropoda
- Class: Insecta
- Order: Orthoptera
- Suborder: Ensifera
- Family: Tettigoniidae
- Subfamily: Phaneropterinae
- Tribe: Microcentrini
- Genus: Microcentrum
- Species: M. californicum

Binomial name
- Microcentrum californicum Hebard, 1932

Species of cricket-like animal

Microcentrum californicum, the California angle-winged katydid, is a species of phaneropterine katydid in the family Tettigoniidae. It is found in North America.
