= Microcentrum latifrons =

Scientific classification
- Domain: Eukaryota
- Kingdom: Animalia
- Phylum: Arthropoda
- Class: Insecta
- Order: Orthoptera
- Suborder: Ensifera
- Family: Tettigoniidae
- Subfamily: Phaneropterinae
- Tribe: Microcentrini
- Genus: Microcentrum
- Species: M. latifrons

Binomial name
- Microcentrum latifrons Spooner, 1989

Species of cricket-like animal

Microcentrum latifrons, the southwestern angle-wing katydid, is a species of phaneropterine katydid in the family Tettigoniidae. It is found in North America.
