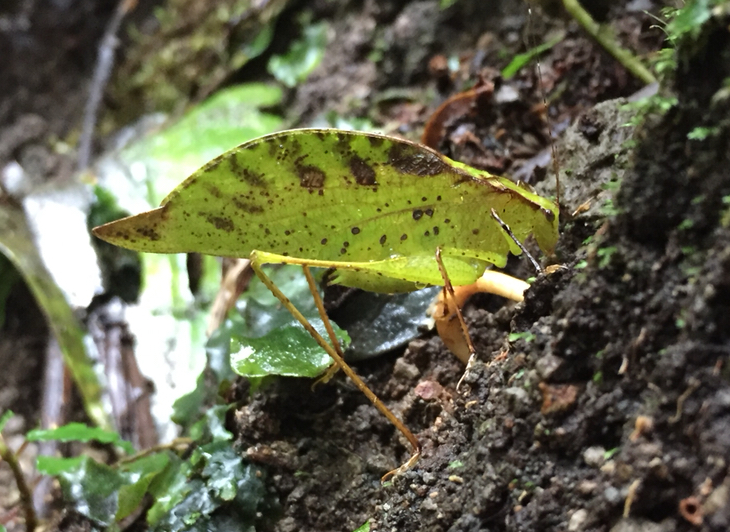
- In Costa Rica

Scientific classification
- Domain: Eukaryota
- Kingdom: Animalia
- Phylum: Arthropoda
- Class: Insecta
- Order: Orthoptera
- Suborder: Ensifera
- Family: Tettigoniidae
- Subfamily: Phaneropterinae
- Genus: Orophus
- Species: O. tessellatus

Binomial name
- Orophus tessellatus (Saussure, 1861)

Synonyms
- Phylloptera tessellata Saussure, 1861; Anepsia tessellata Saussure, 1861); Paragenes tessellata Saussure, 1861); Orophus annulatus (Rehn, 1901); Orophus intacta (Walker, 1871); Orophus obtusus (Griffini, 1896); Orophus subnotata (Walker, 1870); Orophus subpunctata (Walker, 1869)

= Orophus tessellatus =

Species of cricket-like animal

Orophus tessellatus, the false leaf katydid, is a species of katydid native to Mexico, Central America, and South America. It is in the large subfamily Phaneropterinae within the tribe Amblycoryphini. Its coloring varies from brown to green, some with spots, mottling, or uniform in coloration. The body length reaches 16 mm (0.63 in) in males and 22 mm (0.87 in) in females. The ovipositor is approximate 7 mm (0.28 in) in length. The species is characterized by the size of the forewings and their "dirty" coloring.

It was originally described in 1861 as Phylloptera (Orophus) tessellata. The holotype is a female from Oaxaca, Mexico. It is part of the Orophus tessellatus species group, which also contains the species Orophus andinus and Orophus conspersus.
