= Microcentrum angustatum =

Scientific classification
- Domain: Eukaryota
- Kingdom: Animalia
- Phylum: Arthropoda
- Class: Insecta
- Order: Orthoptera
- Suborder: Ensifera
- Family: Tettigoniidae
- Subfamily: Phaneropterinae
- Genus: Microcentrum
- Species: M. angustatum

Binomial name
- Microcentrum angustatum Brunner von Wattenwyl, 1878

Species of cricket-like animal

Microcentrum angustatum is a katydid from South America and the Caribbean

== Locations ==
Samples have been collected from Brazil, Colombia, Bolivia and Trinidad.
