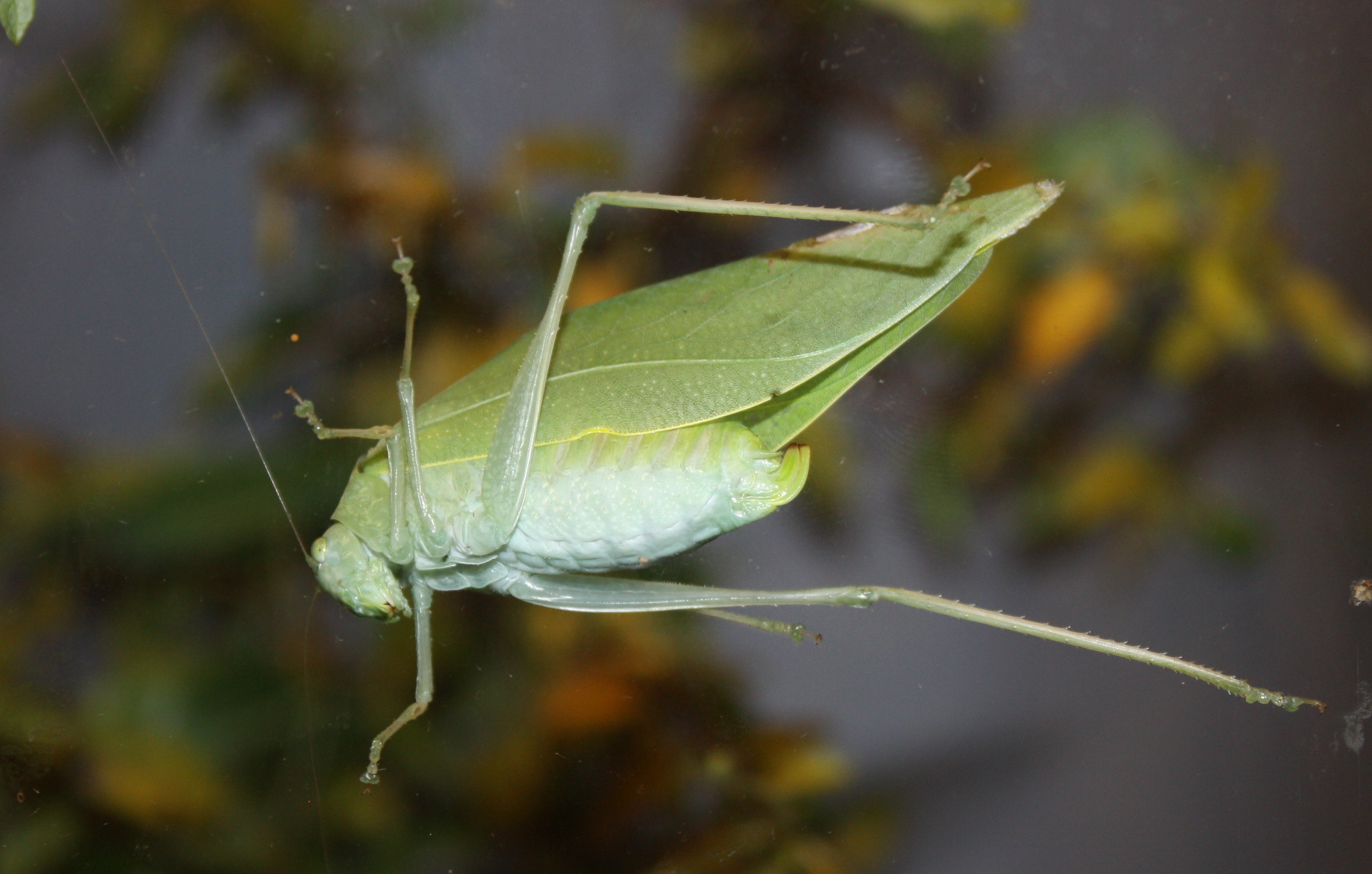

Scientific classification
- Kingdom: Animalia
- Phylum: Arthropoda
- Clade: Pancrustacea
- Class: Insecta
- Order: Orthoptera
- Suborder: Ensifera
- Family: Tettigoniidae
- Subfamily: Phaneropterinae
- Tribe: Microcentrini
- Genus: Microcentrum
- Species: M. retinerve

Binomial name
- Microcentrum retinerve (Burmeister, 1838)

Synonyms
- Microcentrus retinervis (Burmeister, 1838); Orophus retinervis (Burmeister, 1838); Phylloptera salicifolia Saussure, 1859; Phylloptera retinervis Burmeister, 1838

= Microcentrum retinerve =

Species of cricket-like animal

Microcentrum retinerve is a species in the family Tettigoniidae ("katydids"), in the order Orthoptera ("grasshoppers, crickets, katydids"). A common name for Microcentrum retinerve is lesser angle-winged katydid. Microcentrum retinerve is found in North America.

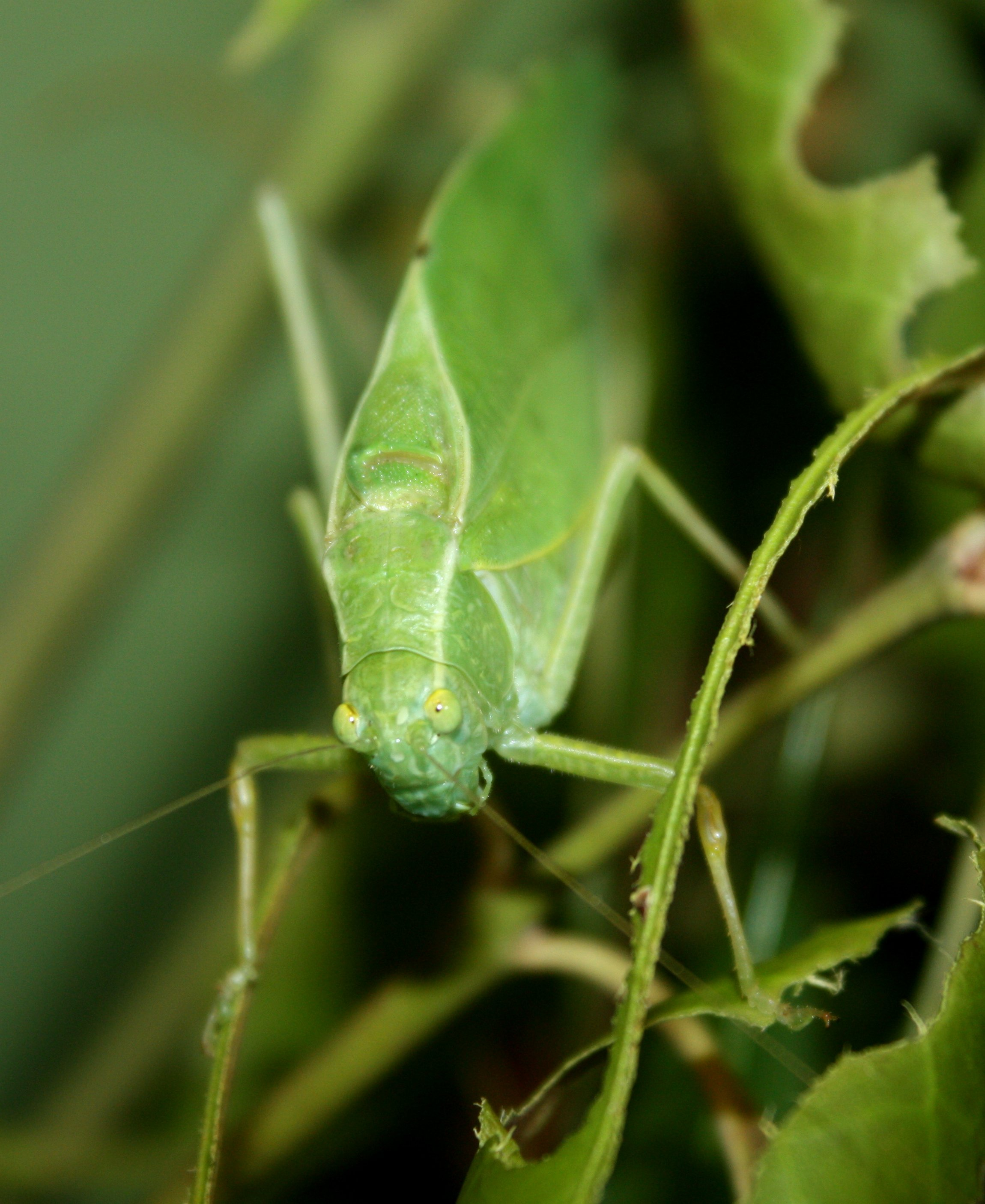

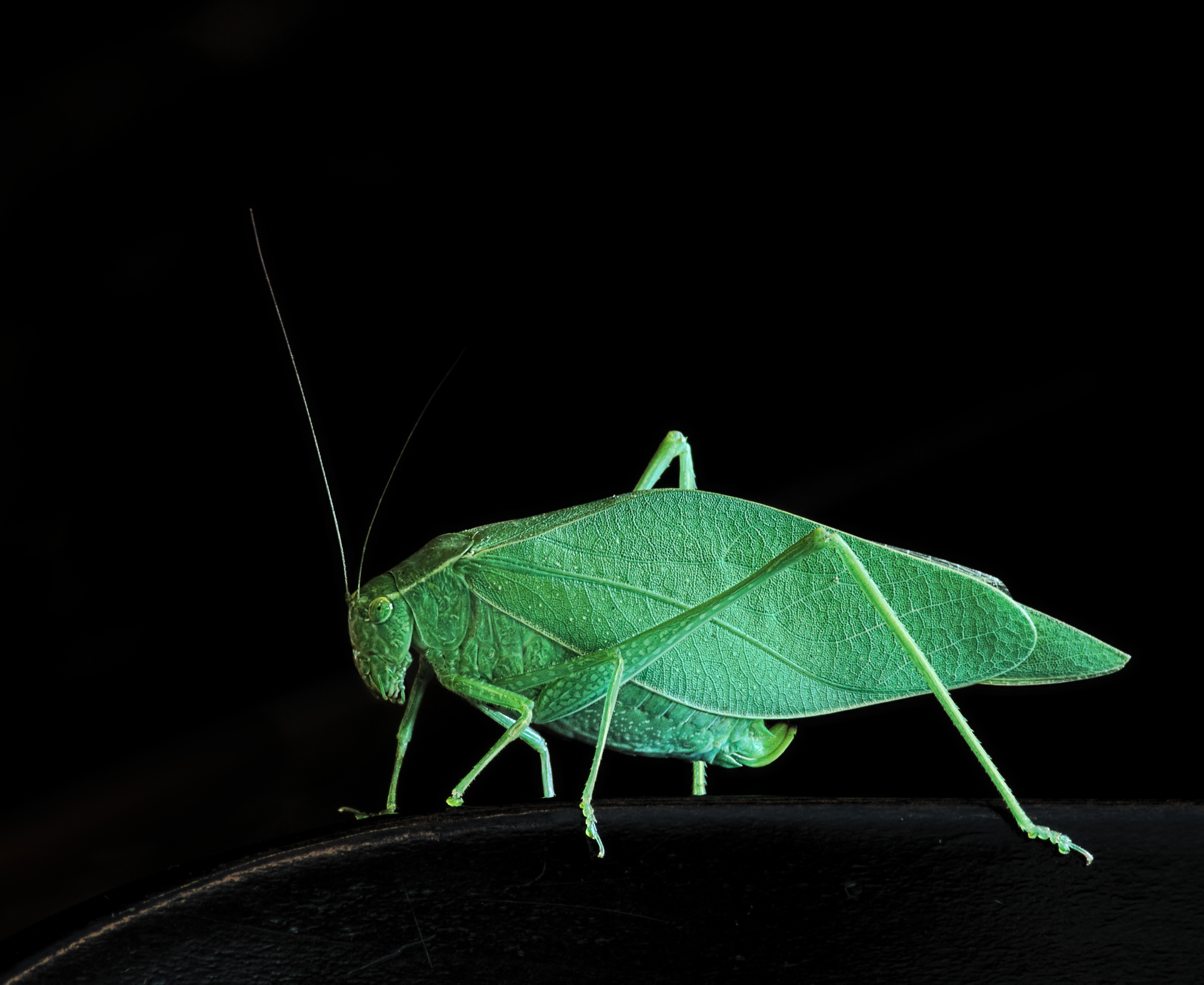

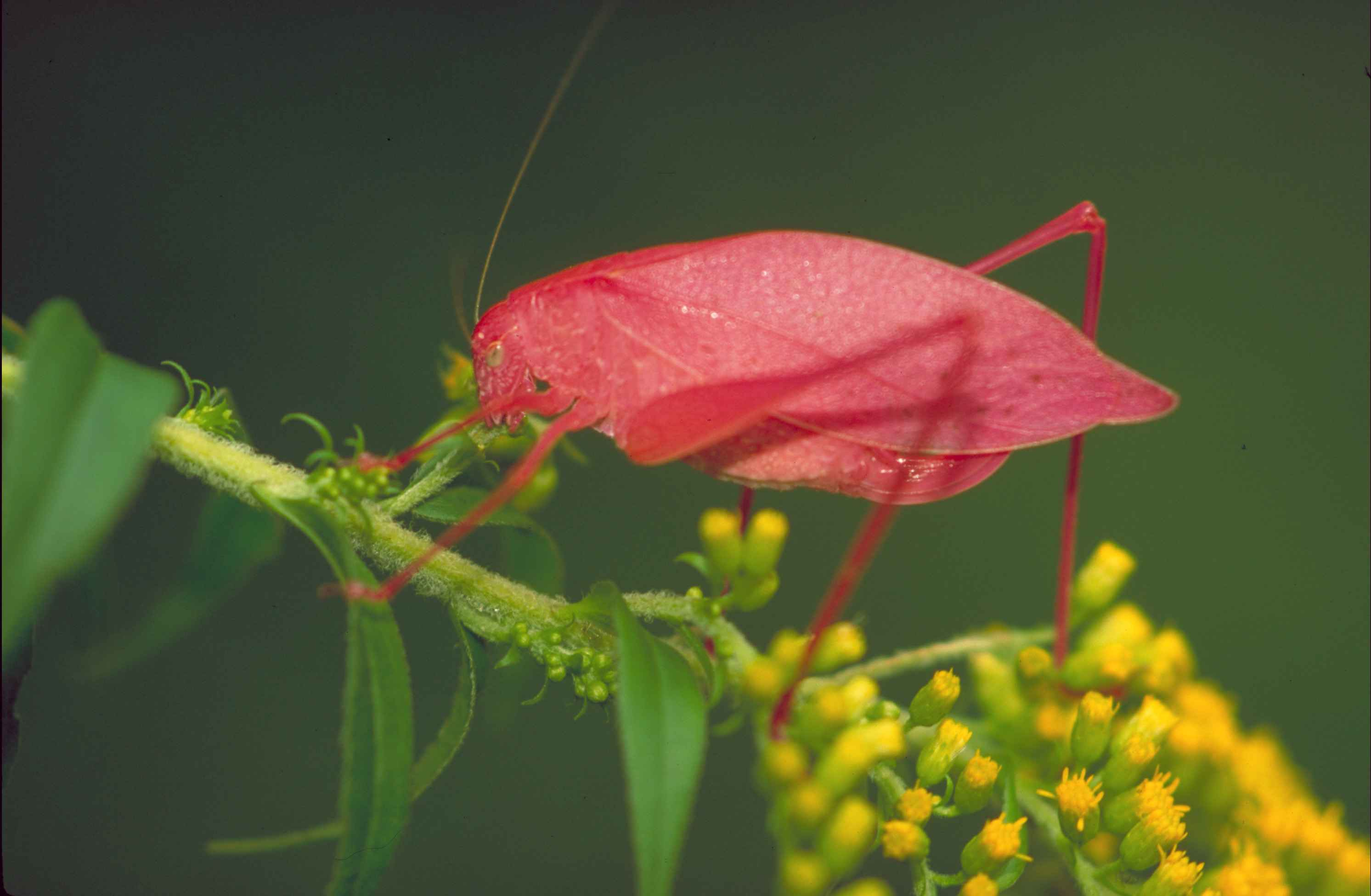
