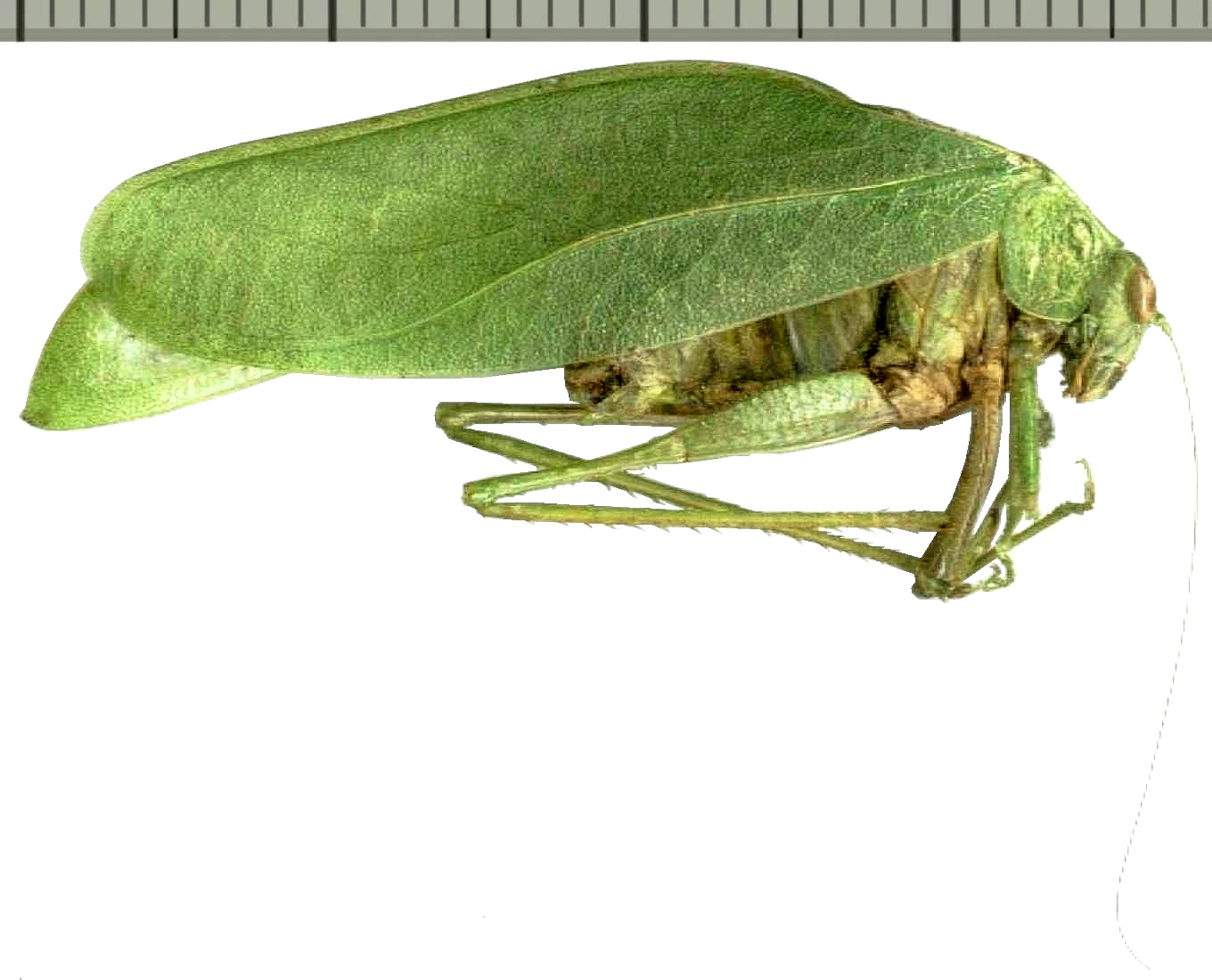

Scientific classification
- Kingdom: Animalia
- Phylum: Arthropoda
- Clade: Pancrustacea
- Class: Insecta
- Order: Orthoptera
- Suborder: Ensifera
- Family: Tettigoniidae
- Subfamily: Phaneropterinae
- Tribe: Amblycoryphini
- Genus: Eurycorypha; Stål, 1873

= Eurycorypha =

Genus of cricket-like animals

Eurycorypha is a genus of insects in the family Tettigoniidae, commonly known as Bush crickets. The genus is indigenous to Sub-Saharan Africa and Madagascar, and contains the following species:

- Eurycorypha adicra
- Eurycorypha aequatorialis
- Eurycorypha arabica
- Eurycorypha brevicollis
- Eurycorypha brevipennis
- Eurycorypha brunneri
- Eurycorypha canaliculata
- Eurycorypha cereris
- Eurycorypha cuspidata
- Eurycorypha darlingi
- Eurycorypha diminuta
- Eurycorypha fallax
- Eurycorypha flavescens
- Eurycorypha gramineus
- Eurycorypha kevani
- Eurycorypha klaptoczi
- Eurycorypha laticercis
- Eurycorypha lesnei
- Eurycorypha meruensis
- Eurycorypha montana
- Eurycorypha mutica
- Eurycorypha ornatipes
- Eurycorypha pianofortis
- Eurycorypha prasinata
- Eurycorypha proserpinae
- Eurycorypha punctipennis
- Eurycorypha securifera
- Eurycorypha simillima
- Eurycorypha spinulosa
- Eurycorypha stenophthalma
- Eurycorypha strangulata
- Eurycorypha stylata
- Eurycorypha sudanensis
- Eurycorypha varia
- Eurycorypha velicauda
- Eurycorypha zebrata
