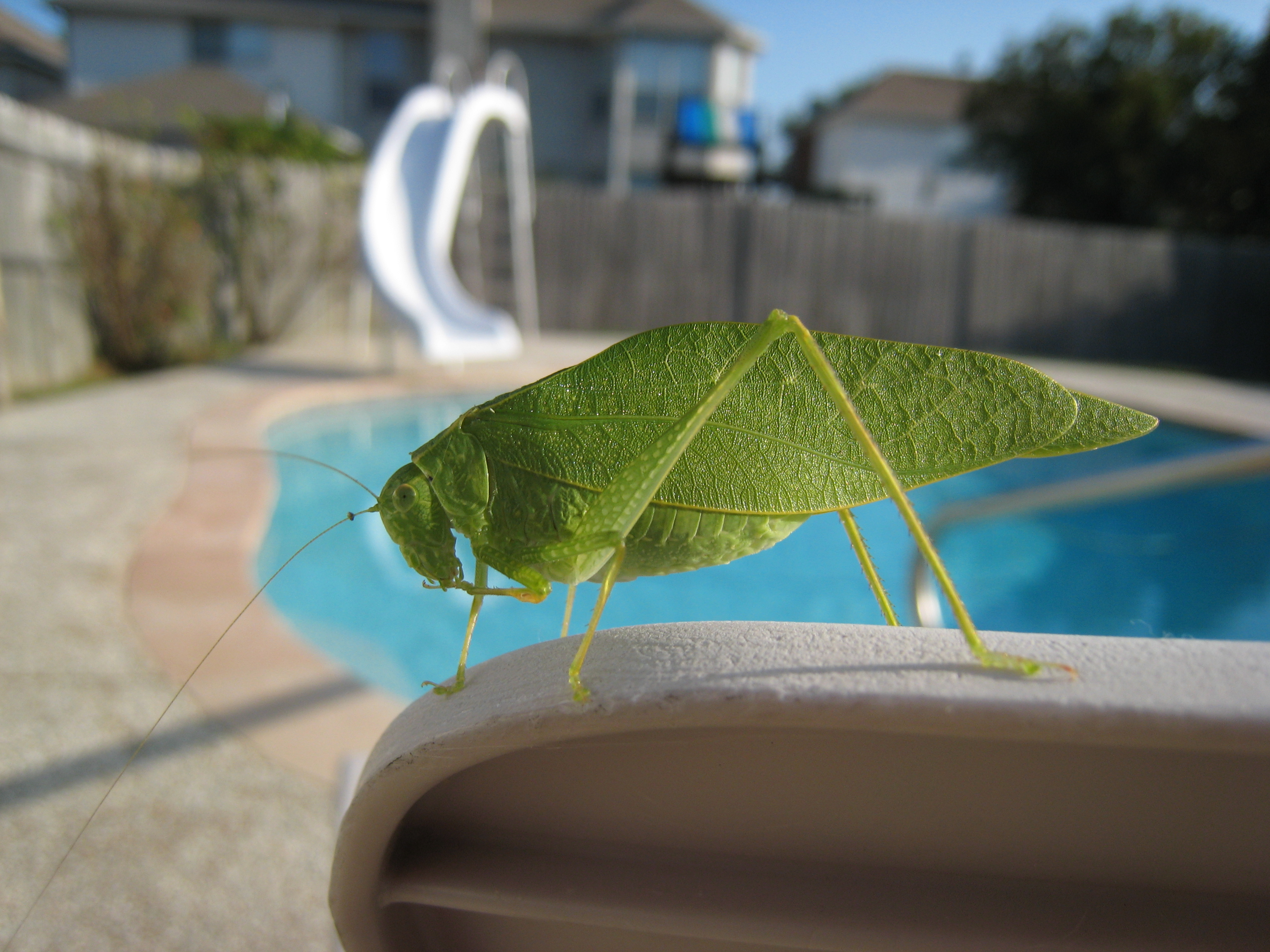
- Microcentrum rhombifolium

Scientific classification
- Domain: Eukaryota
- Kingdom: Animalia
- Phylum: Arthropoda
- Class: Insecta
- Order: Orthoptera
- Suborder: Ensifera
- Family: Tettigoniidae
- Subfamily: Phaneropterinae
- Tribe: Microcentrini
- Genus: Microcentrum; Scudder, 1862

Synonyms
- Microcentrus Riley, 1874; Linkia Piza, 1971 (preocc.); Acrephyllum Piza, 1973; Malkinia Piza, 1979 (preocc.); Carnavalia Koçak & Kemal, 2008

= Microcentrum =

Genus of cricket-like animals

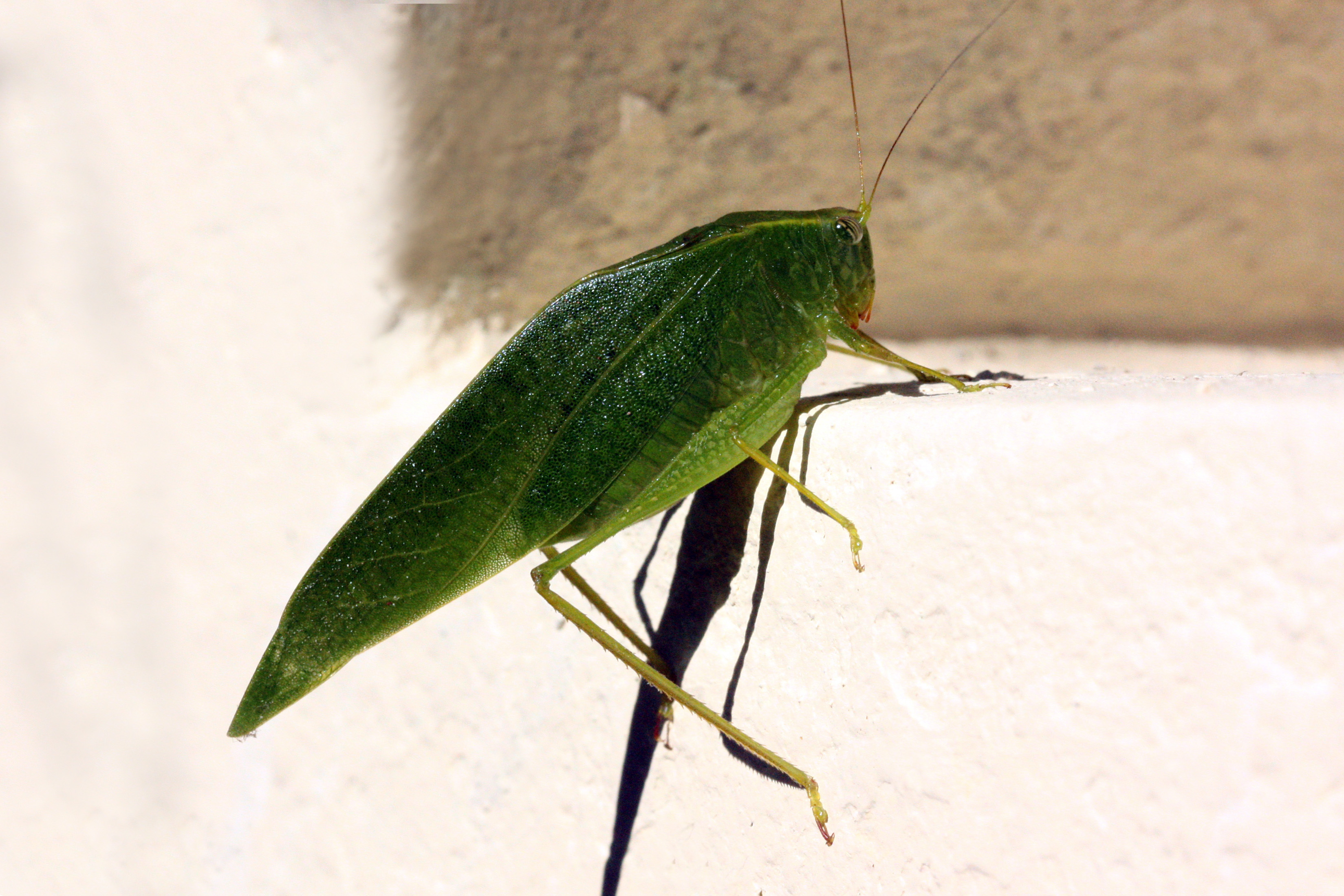
Lesser angle-wing katydid Microcentrum retinerve, Jamaica

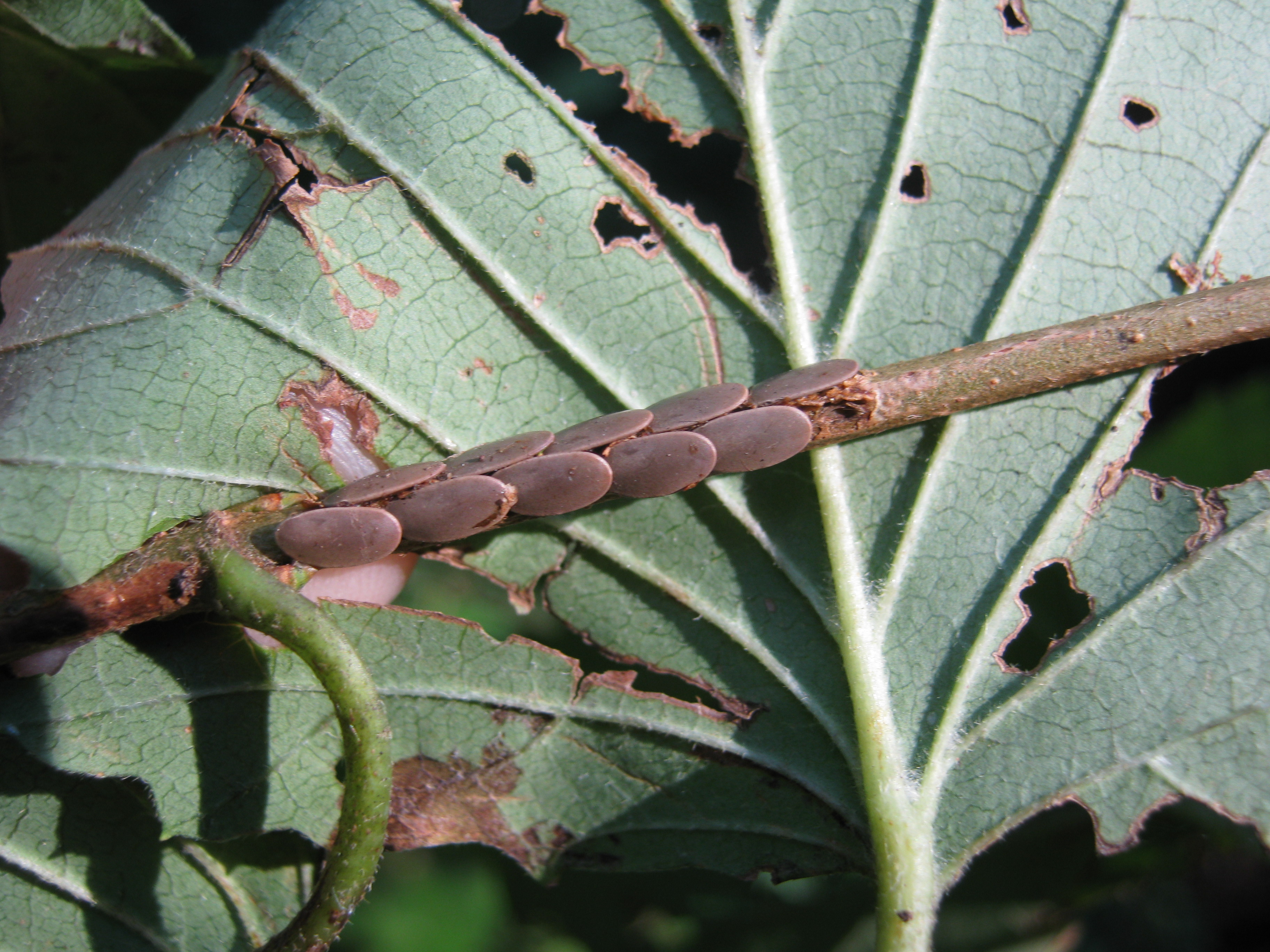
Eggs of Microcentrum.

Microcentrum is a genus of phaneropterid katydids, sometimes known as "angle-wing katydids" and found in the Americas.

== Species ==
The Orthoptera Species File lists the following species:

- Microcentrum angustatum - South America and the Caribbean
- Microcentrum bicentenarium from Southeastern Brazil
- Microcentrum californicum - California
- Microcentrum championi - Panama
- Microcentrum concisum - Panama
- Microcentrum costaricense - Costa Rica
- Microcentrum gurupi - Eastern Brazil
- Microcentrum incarnatum - Southeastern United States
- Microcentrum irregulare - far-western Brazil
- Microcentrum lanceolatum - Brazil
- Microcentrum latifrons - Southwestern US
- Microcentrum linki - southern Brazil
- Microcentrum louisianum - Louisiana, Mississippi and Tennessee
- Microcentrum lucidum - northeastern Brazil
- Microcentrum malkini - Suriname
- Microcentrum marginatum - northeastern Brazil
- Microcentrum micromargaritiferum - Brazil
- Microcentrum minus - Texas
- Microcentrum myrtifolium - Central and South America
- Microcentrum nauticum - Northern Brazil
- Microcentrum navigator - Northern Brazil
- Microcentrum nigrolineatum - Bolivia
- Microcentrum philammon - Central America and Colombia
- Microcentrum punctifrons - French Guiana
- Microcentrum retinerve - eastern United States
- Microcentrum rhombifolium - United States and Mexico
- Microcentrum securiferum - Panama
- Microcentrum simplex - Central America
- Microcentrum stylatum - Mexico
- Microcentrum suave - Northwest Mexico
- Microcentrum surinamense - Suriname
- Microcentrum syntechnoides - Central America
- Microcentrum totonacum - Mexico
- Microcentrum triangulatum - Caribbean Sea
- Microcentrum veraguae - Trinidad River, Panama
- Microcentrum w-signatum - southeastern Brazil
