= Amblycorypha uhleri =

Scientific classification
- Kingdom: Animalia
- Phylum: Arthropoda
- Clade: Pancrustacea
- Class: Insecta
- Order: Orthoptera
- Suborder: Ensifera
- Family: Tettigoniidae
- Subfamily: Phaneropterinae
- Tribe: Amblycoryphini
- Genus: Amblycorypha
- Species: A. uhleri

Binomial name
- Amblycorypha uhleri Stål, 1876

Species of cricket-like animal

Amblycorypha uhleri, known generally as the Uhler's virtuoso katydid or Uhler's katydid, is a species of phaneropterine katydid in the family Tettigoniidae. It is found in North America.
