= Amblycorypha parvipennis =

Scientific classification
- Kingdom: Animalia
- Phylum: Arthropoda
- Class: Insecta
- Order: Orthoptera
- Suborder: Ensifera
- Family: Tettigoniidae
- Subfamily: Phaneropterinae
- Tribe: Amblycoryphini
- Genus: Amblycorypha
- Species: A. parvipennis

Binomial name
- Amblycorypha parvipennis Stål, 1876

Species of cricket-like animal

Amblycorypha parvipennis, the western round-winged katydid, is a species of phaneropterine katydid in the family Tettigoniidae. It is found in North America.

== Subspecies ==
These two subspecies belong to the species Amblycorypha parvipennis:

- Amblycorypha parvipennis brachyptera Ball, 1897
- Amblycorypha parvipennis parvipennis Stål, 1876
