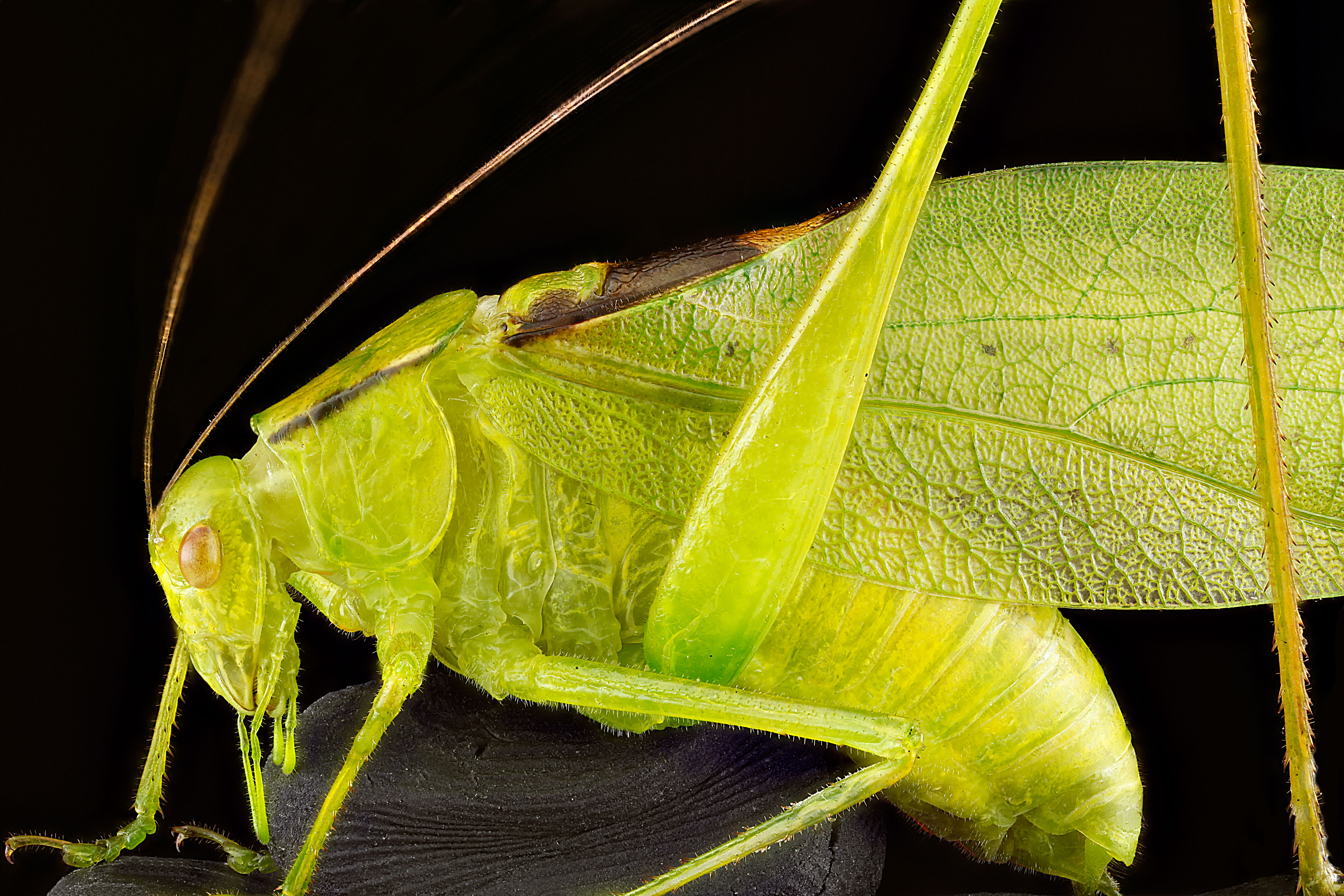

Scientific classification
- Domain: Eukaryota
- Kingdom: Animalia
- Phylum: Arthropoda
- Class: Insecta
- Order: Orthoptera
- Suborder: Ensifera
- Family: Tettigoniidae
- Subfamily: Phaneropterinae
- Genus: Amblycorypha
- Species: A. oblongifolia

Binomial name
- Amblycorypha oblongifolia (De Geer, 1773)

= Amblycorypha oblongifolia =

Species of cricket-like animal

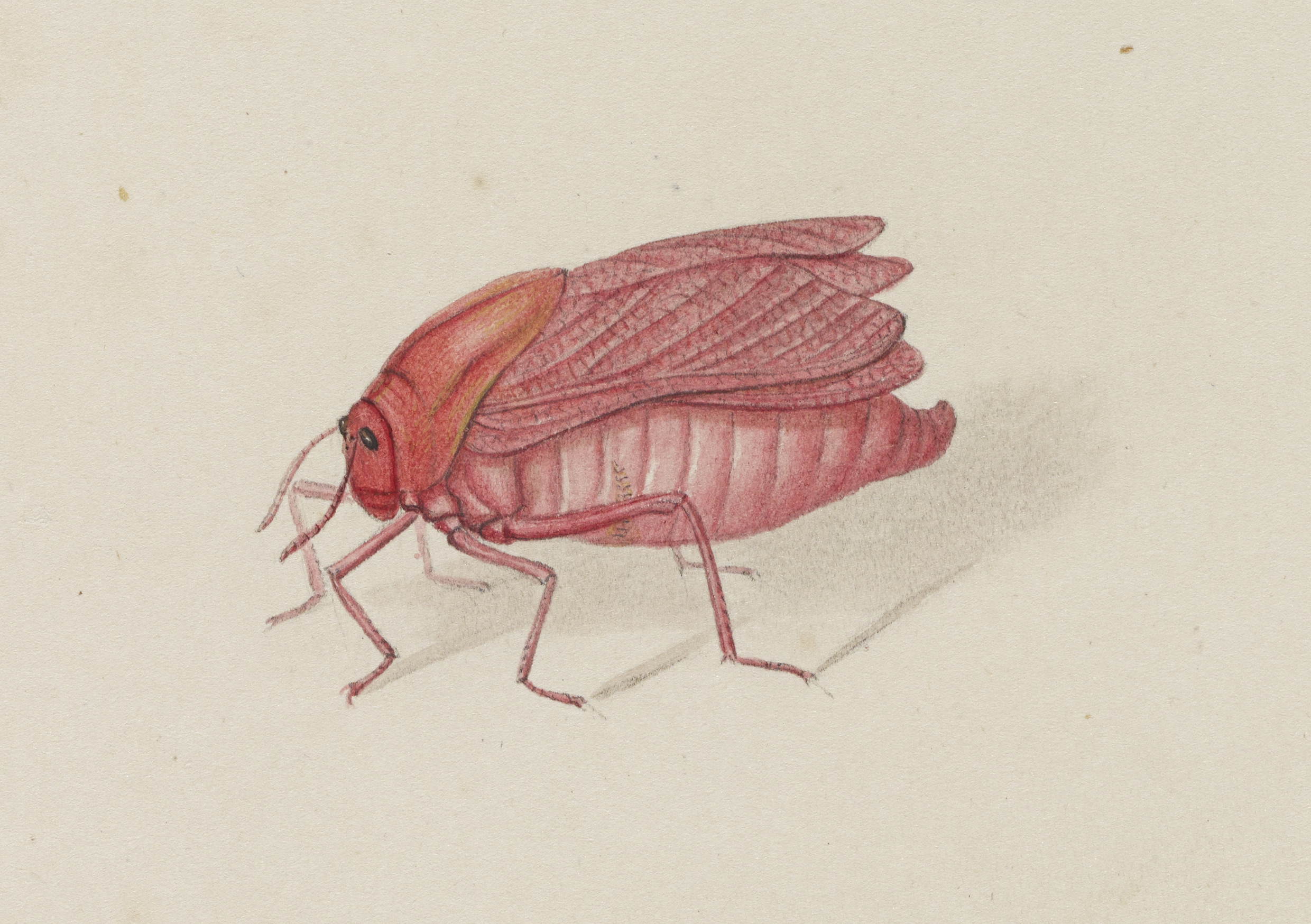
Watercolour painting of a pink katydid by Ann Lee painted between 1770 and 1790

Amblycorypha oblongifolia, the oblong-winged katydid, is a species of insect of the family Tettigoniidae (katydids or bush-crickets).

== Appearance ==
The oblong-winged katydid is either green, tan, pink, or a dark tan or orange. Green is the most common amongst this species of katydid. Pink and tan are rare, but dark tan or orange is very rare. The origin of the unusual color stem from genetics, not from gender, age, or environment. The color is apparent from birth, and throughout their life.

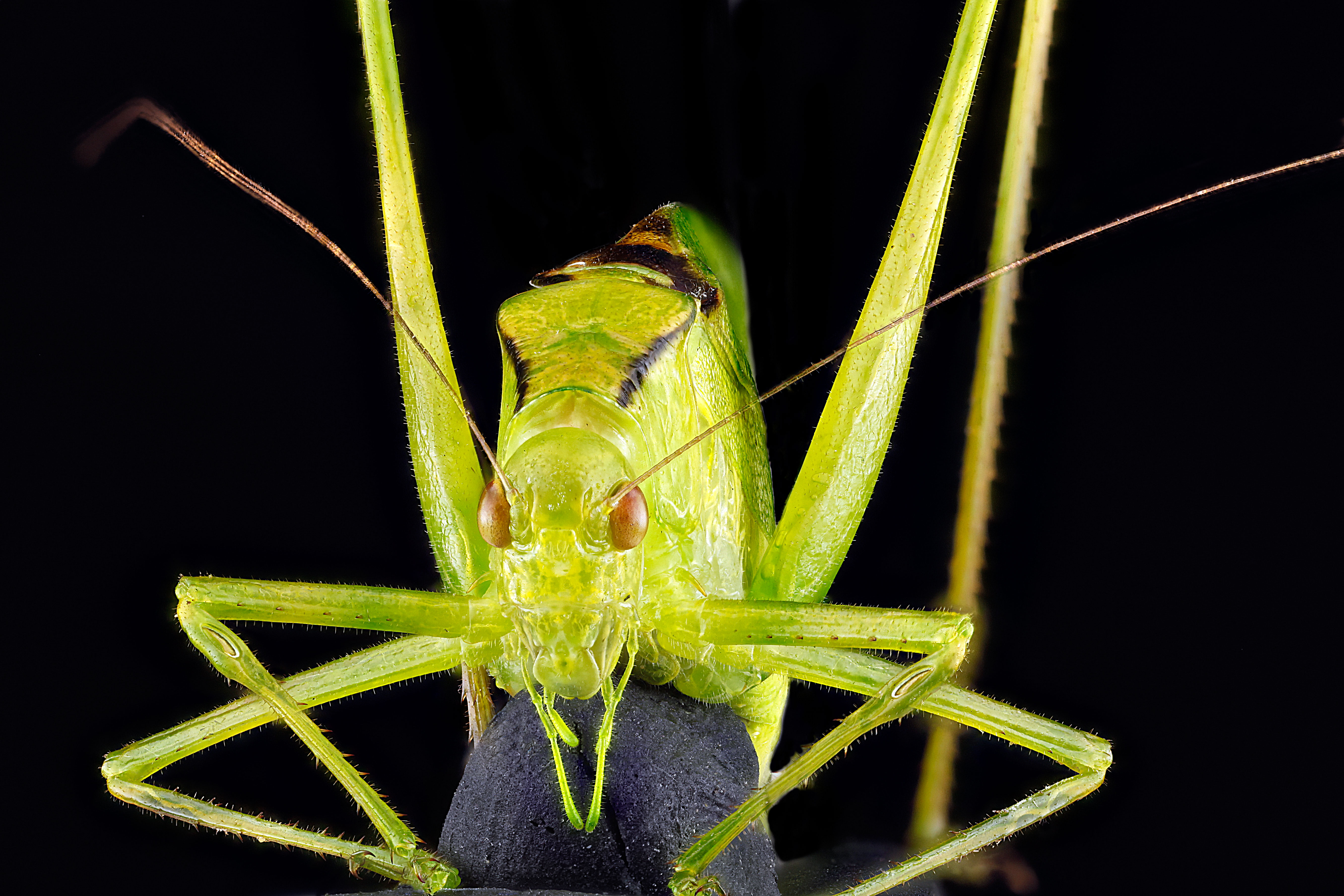
Frontal view

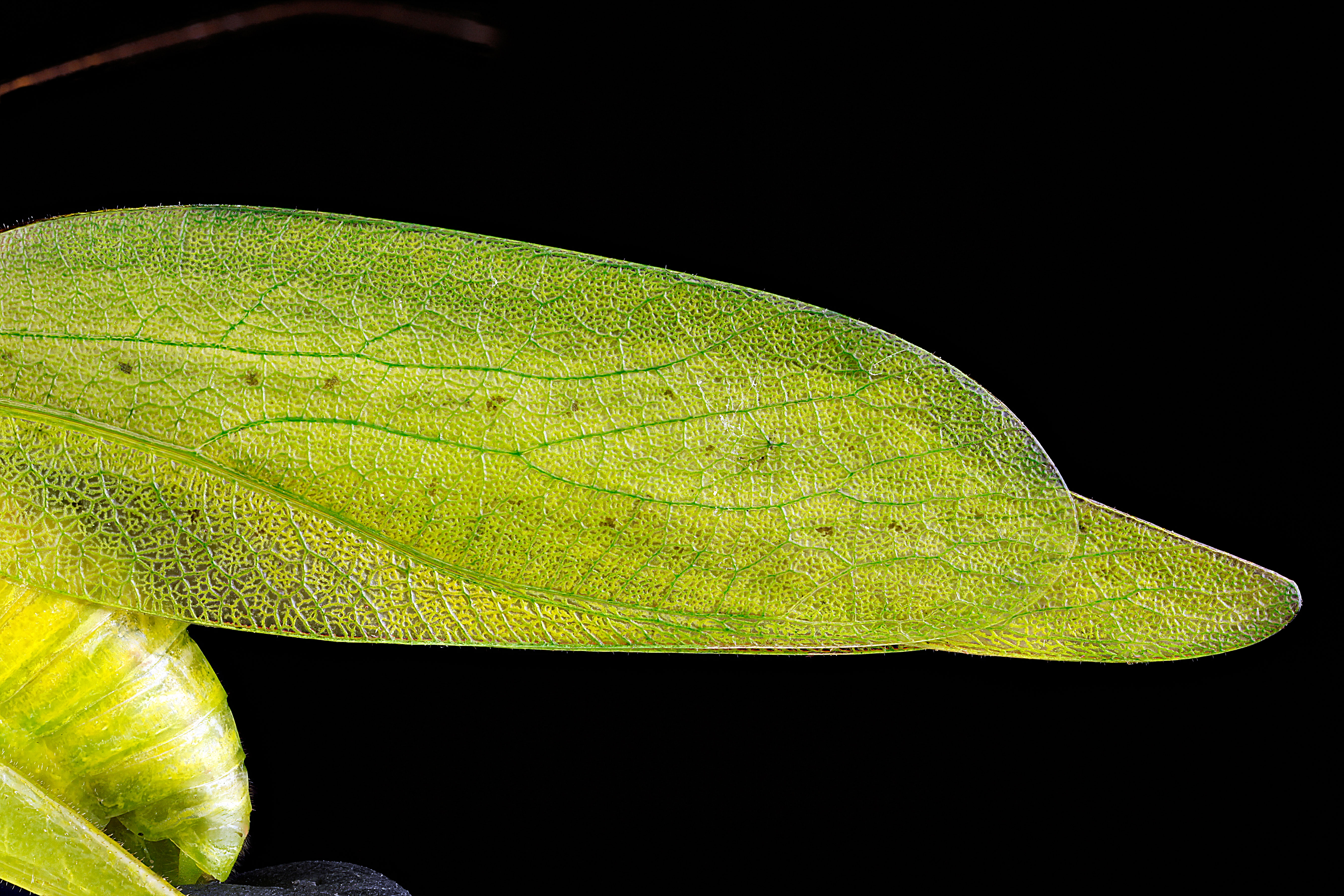
Wing

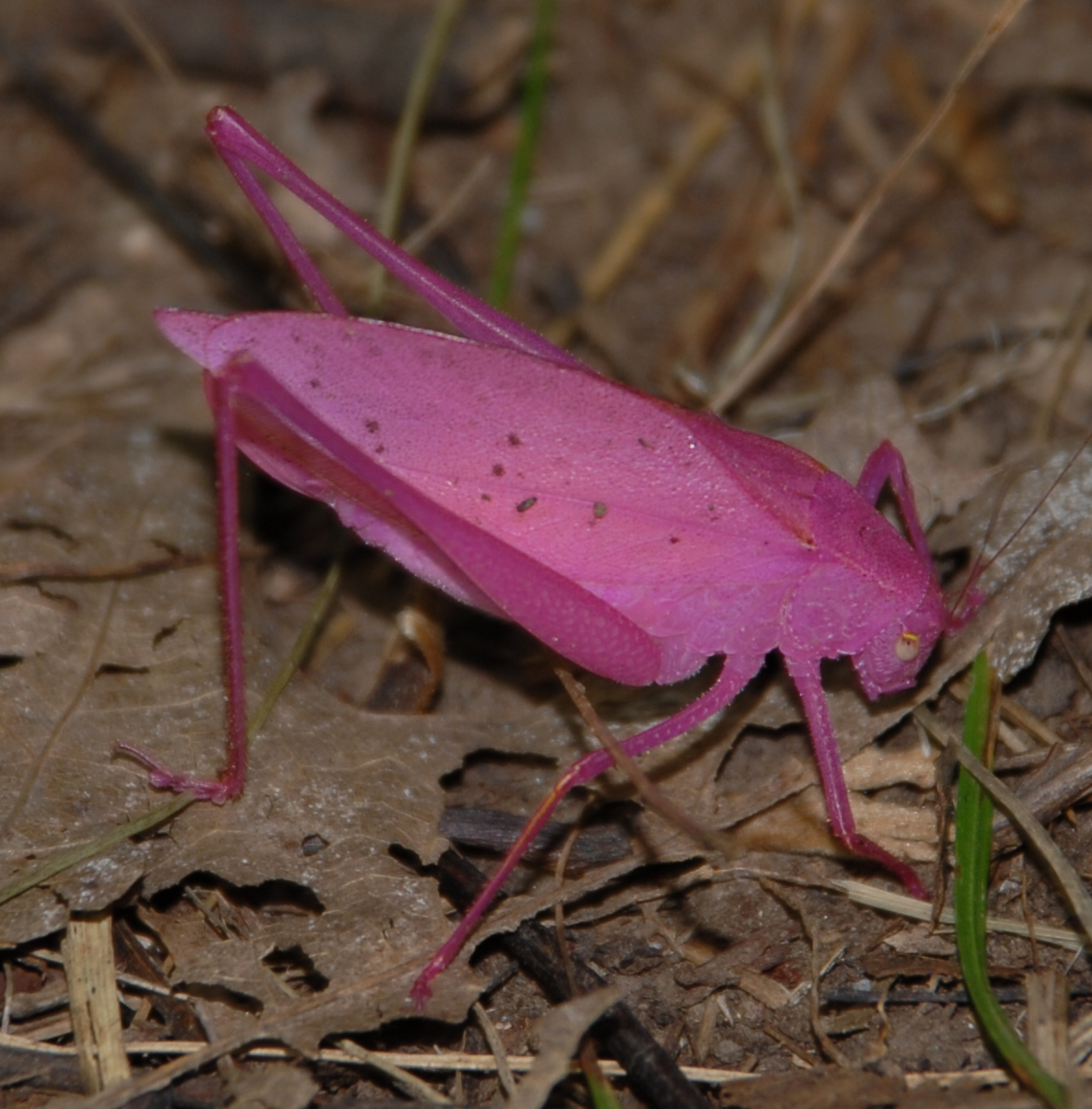
Pink form

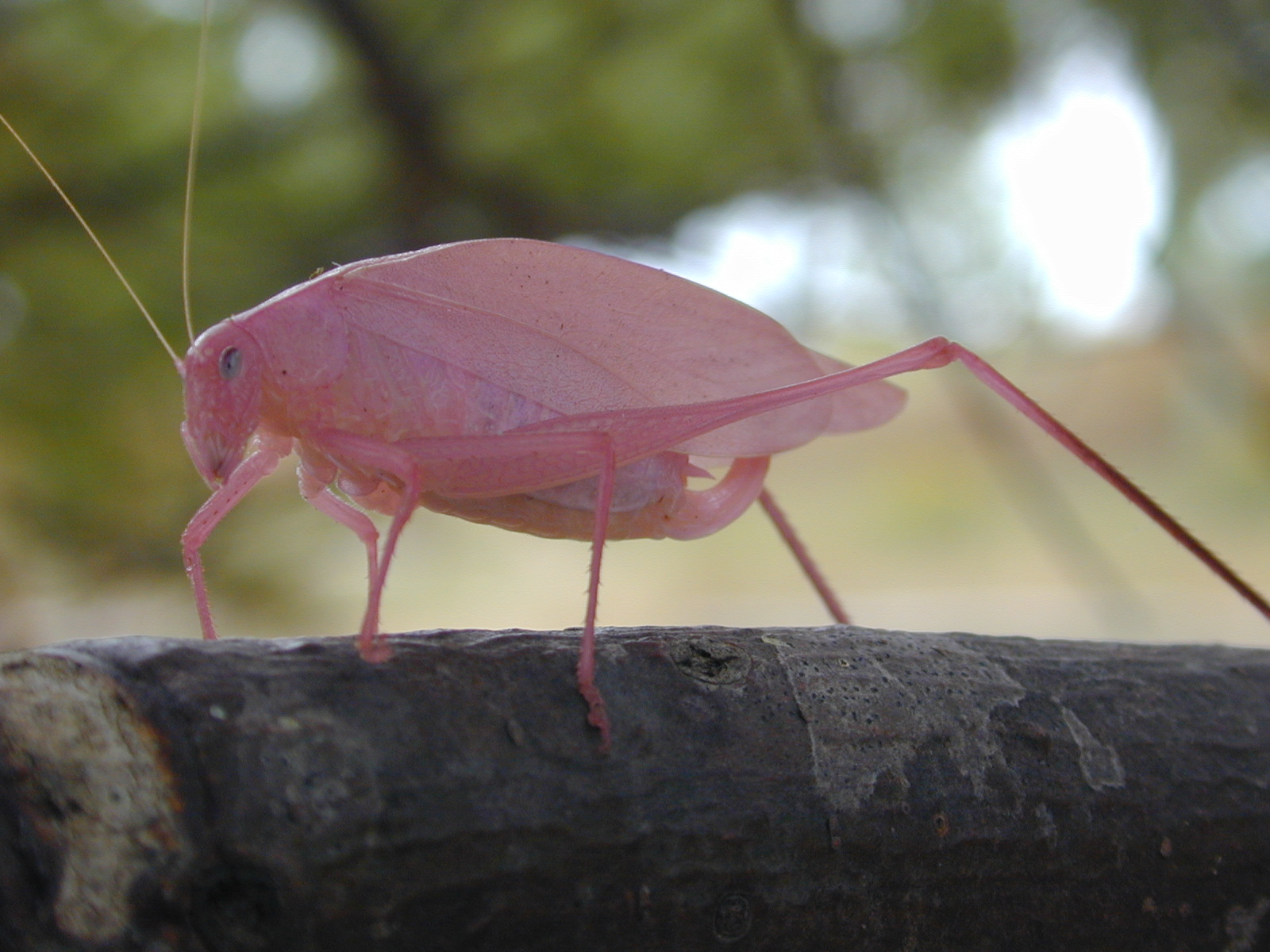

== Distribution ==
The oblong-winged katydid is common throughout the northeast of North America, but also can be found in the Midwest.
