= Amblycorypha rotundifolia =

Scientific classification
- Domain: Eukaryota
- Kingdom: Animalia
- Phylum: Arthropoda
- Class: Insecta
- Order: Orthoptera
- Suborder: Ensifera
- Family: Tettigoniidae
- Subfamily: Phaneropterinae
- Tribe: Amblycoryphini
- Genus: Amblycorypha
- Species: A. rotundifolia

Binomial name
- Amblycorypha rotundifolia (Scudder, 1863)

Species of cricket-like animal

Amblycorypha rotundifolia, the rattler round-winged katydid, is a species of phaneropterine katydid in the family Tettigoniidae. It is found in North America.
