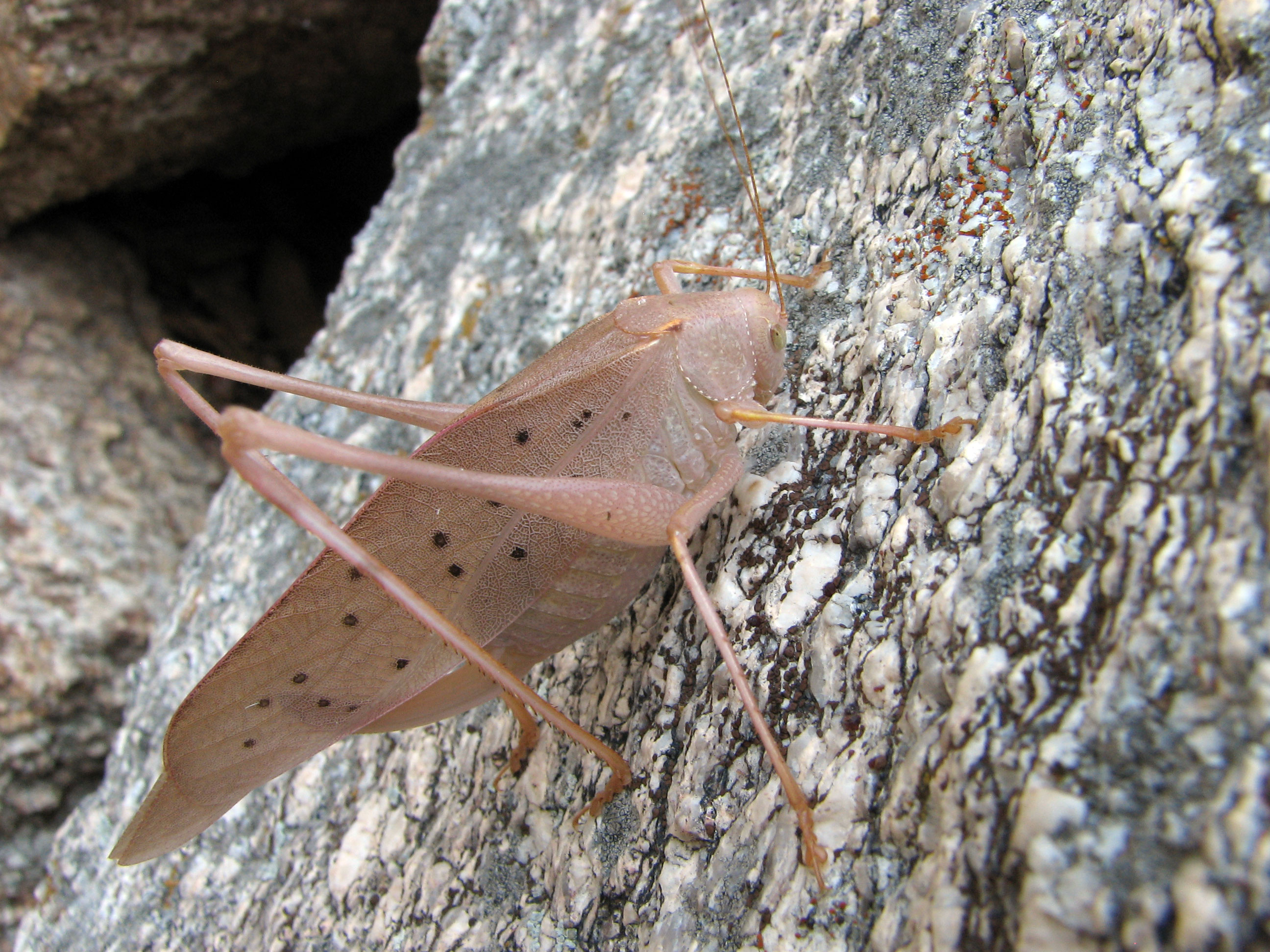
- Amblycorypha insolita

Scientific classification
- Kingdom: Animalia
- Phylum: Arthropoda
- Class: Insecta
- Order: Orthoptera
- Suborder: Ensifera
- Family: Tettigoniidae
- Subfamily: Phaneropterinae
- Tribe: Amblycoryphini
- Genus: Amblycorypha; Stål, 1873

= Amblycorypha =

Genus of cricket-like animals

Amblycorypha is a North American genus of round-headed katydids in the family Tettigoniidae. There are about 14 described species in Amblycorypha.

== Species ==
These 14 species belong to the genus Amblycorypha:

- Amblycorypha alexanderi T. J. Walker, 2003 (clicker round-winged katydid)
- Amblycorypha arenicola Walker, T.J., 2004 (sandhill virtuoso katydid)
- Amblycorypha bartrami T. J. Walker, 2003 (Bartram's round-winged katydid)
- Amblycorypha cajuni Walker, T.J., 2004
- Amblycorypha carinata Rehn, J.A.G. & Hebard, 1914 (carinate katydid)
- Amblycorypha floridana Rehn, 1905 (Florida oblong-winged katydid)
- Amblycorypha huasteca (Saussure, 1859) (Texas oblong-winged katydid)
- Amblycorypha insolita Rehn & Hebard, 1914 (big bend oblong-winged katydid)
- Amblycorypha longinicta Walker, T.J., 2004 (common virtuoso katydid)
- Amblycorypha oblongifolia (De Geer, 1773) (oblong-winged katydid)
- Amblycorypha parvipennis Stål, 1876 (western round-winged katydid)
- Amblycorypha rivograndis Walker, T.J., 2004
- Amblycorypha rotundifolia (Scudder, 1863) (rattler round-winged katydid)
- Amblycorypha uhleri Stål, 1876 (Uhler's virtuoso katydid)
