= Amblycorypha bartrami =

Scientific classification
- Domain: Eukaryota
- Kingdom: Animalia
- Phylum: Arthropoda
- Class: Insecta
- Order: Orthoptera
- Suborder: Ensifera
- Family: Tettigoniidae
- Subfamily: Phaneropterinae
- Tribe: Amblycoryphini
- Genus: Amblycorypha
- Species: A. bartrami

Binomial name
- Amblycorypha bartrami T. J. Walker, 2003

Species of cricket-like animal

Amblycorypha bartrami, or Bartram's round-winged katydid, is a species of phaneropterine katydid in the family Tettigoniidae. It is found in North America.
