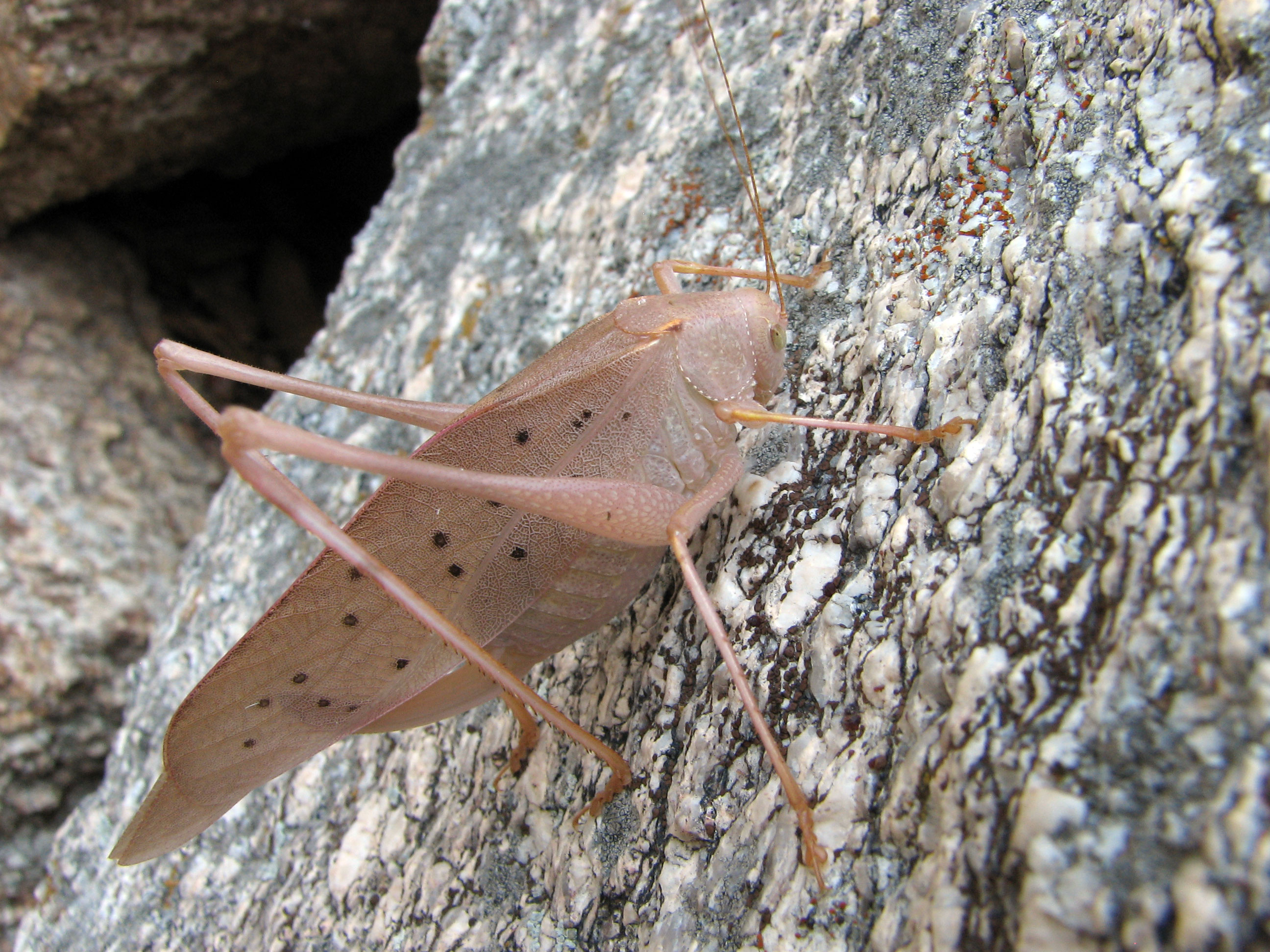

Scientific classification
- Kingdom: Animalia
- Phylum: Arthropoda
- Class: Insecta
- Order: Orthoptera
- Suborder: Ensifera
- Family: Tettigoniidae
- Subfamily: Phaneropterinae
- Tribe: Amblycoryphini
- Genus: Amblycorypha
- Species: A. insolita

Binomial name
- Amblycorypha insolita Rehn & Hebard, 1914

= Amblycorypha insolita =

Species of cricket-like animal

Amblycorypha insolita, known generally as the Big Bend oblong-winged katydid or Big Bend false katydid, is a species of phaneropterine katydid in the family Tettigoniidae. It is found in North America.
