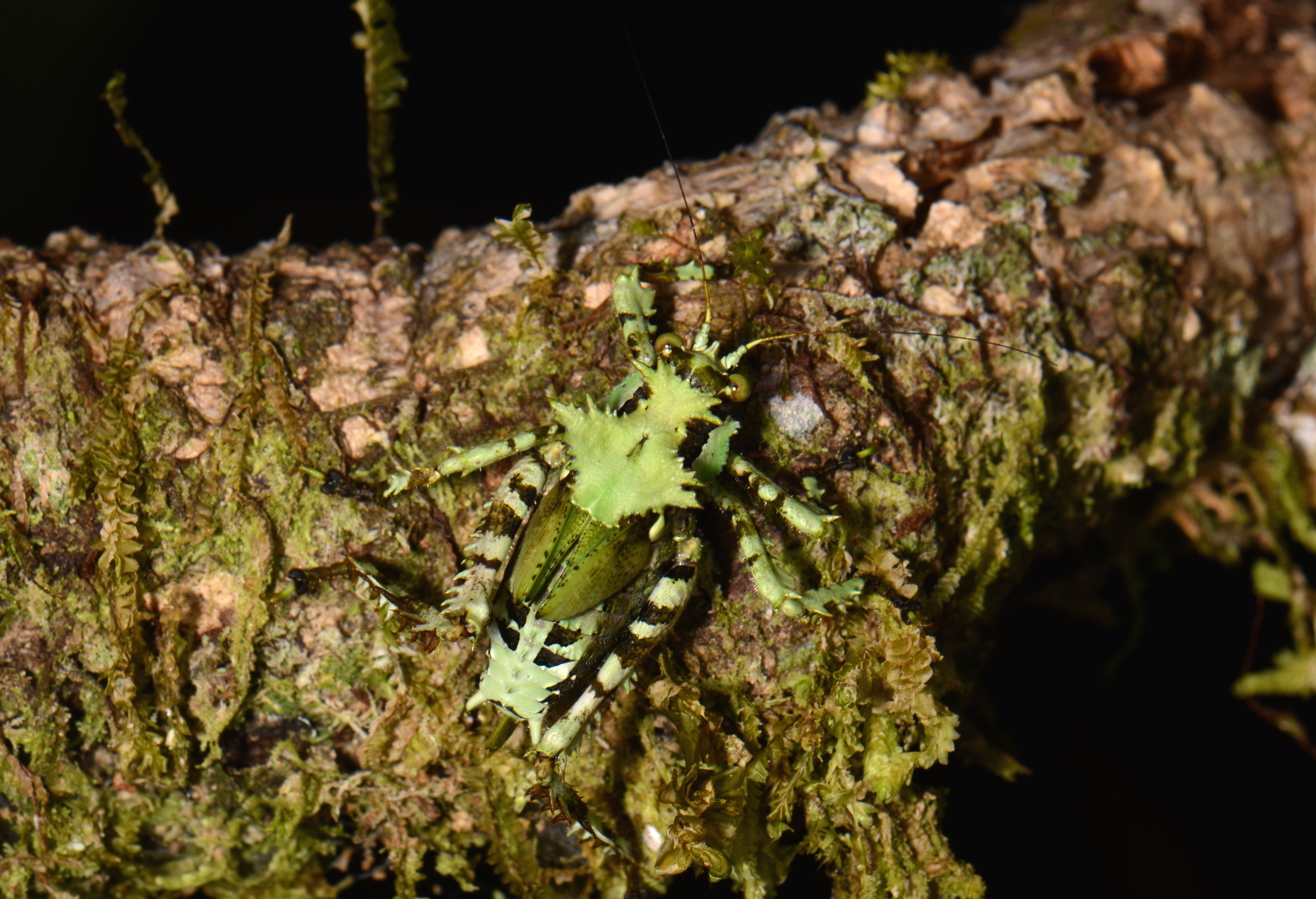
- Trachyzulpha sp. (Sumatra)

Scientific classification
- Domain: Eukaryota
- Kingdom: Animalia
- Phylum: Arthropoda
- Class: Insecta
- Order: Orthoptera
- Suborder: Ensifera
- Family: Tettigoniidae
- Subfamily: Phaneropterinae
- Genus: Trachyzulpha; Dohrn, 1892

= Trachyzulpha =

Genus of cricket-like animals

Trachyzulpha is a genus of bush crickets in the subfamily Phaneropterinae, found in China, Indochina and Malaysia. It the only genus in the monogeneric tribe Trachyzulphini Gorochov, 2014, which was previously placed in the tribe "Tylopsini" (now the monogeneric tribe Tylopsidini). Species often resmble epiphytes such as lichens for protective camouflage.

== Species ==
The Orthoptera Species File lists:

1. Trachyzulpha annulifera Carl, 1914 - Vietnam
2. Trachyzulpha bhutanica Gorochov, 2014
3. Trachyzulpha formosana Shiraki, 1930
4. Trachyzulpha fruhstorferi Dohrn, 1892 - subspecies:
  1. T. fruhstorferi borneo Gorochov, 2014
  2. T. fruhstorferi fruhstorferi Dohrn, 1892 - type species - Java
  3. T. fruhstorferi varia Gorochov, 2014 - Vietnam
5. Trachyzulpha siamica Gorochov, 2014 - Thailand
6. Trachyzulpha sinuosa Liu, 2014 - southern China
