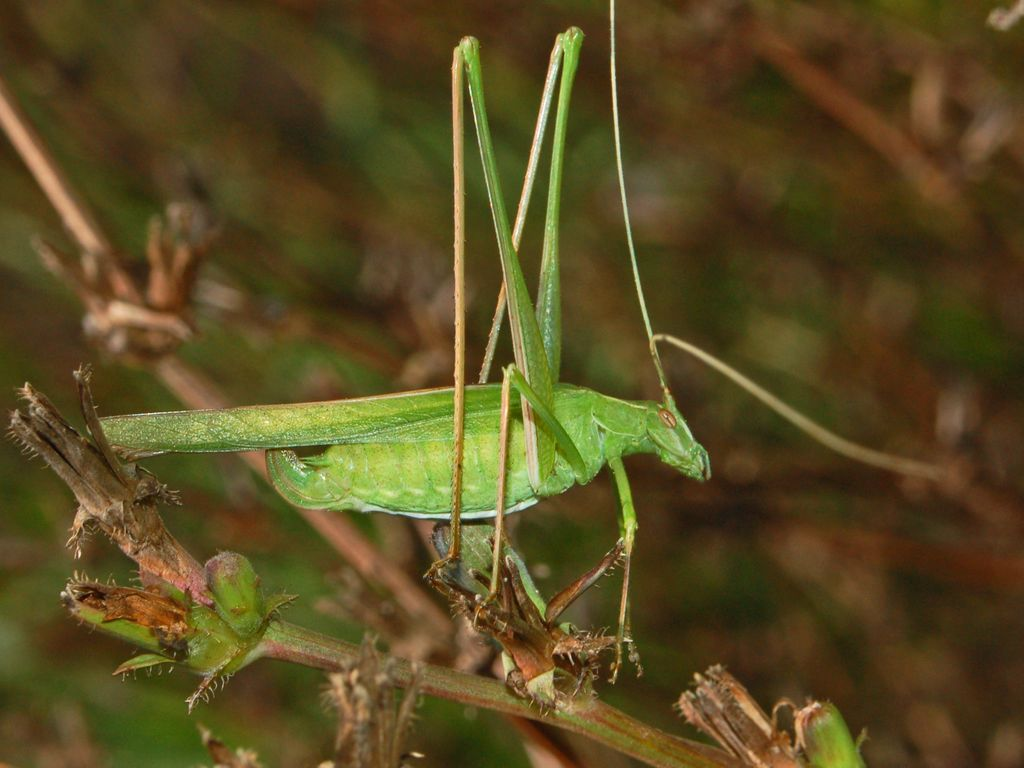
- Female

Conservation status
- Least Concern (IUCN 3.1)

Scientific classification
- Kingdom: Animalia
- Phylum: Arthropoda
- Clade: Pancrustacea
- Class: Insecta
- Order: Orthoptera
- Suborder: Ensifera
- Family: Tettigoniidae
- Subfamily: Phaneropterinae
- Genus: Tylopsis
- Species: T. lilifolia

Binomial name
- Tylopsis lilifolia (Fabricius, 1793)
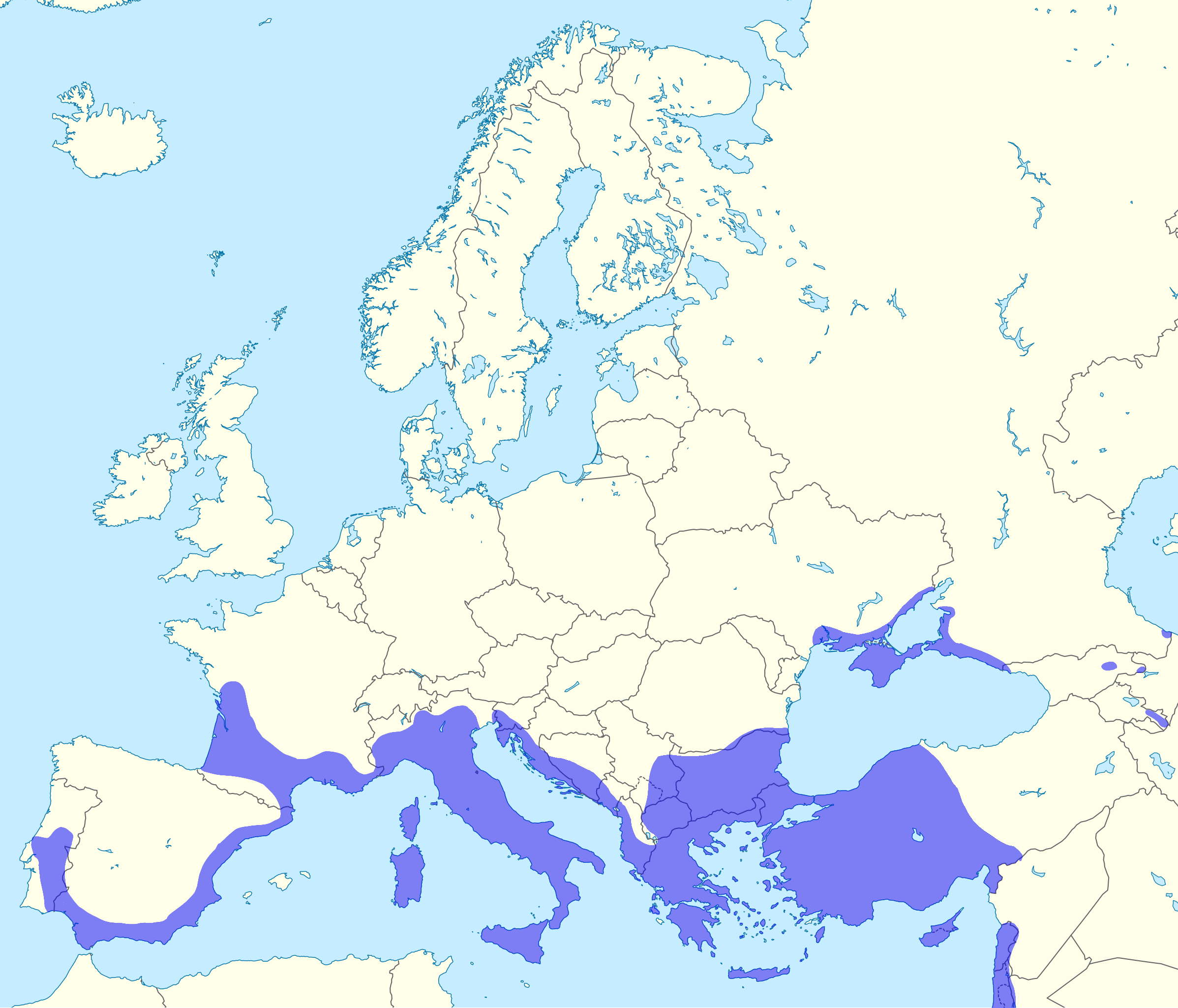

Synonyms
- Centrophorus spinosus Fischer von Waldheim, 1846 3; Locusta gracilis Germar, 1817; Locusta lilifolia Fabricius, 1793; Locusta thymifolia Petagna, 1792; Phaneroptera margineguttata Serville, 1838; Phaneroptera praeusta Fischer von Waldheim, 1846; Tylopsis thymifolia (Petagna, 1792)

= Tylopsis lilifolia =

Species of cricket-like animal

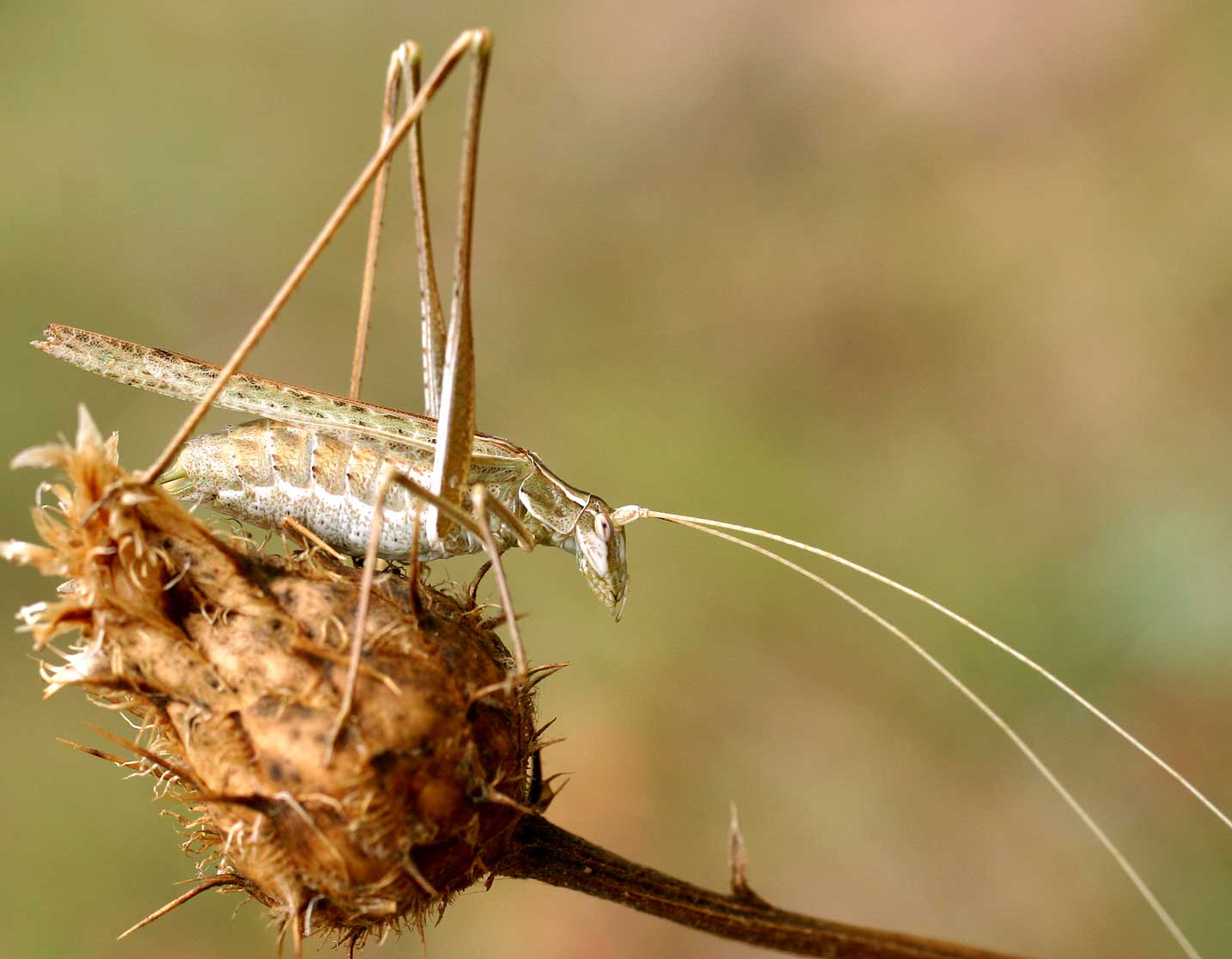
Brown form

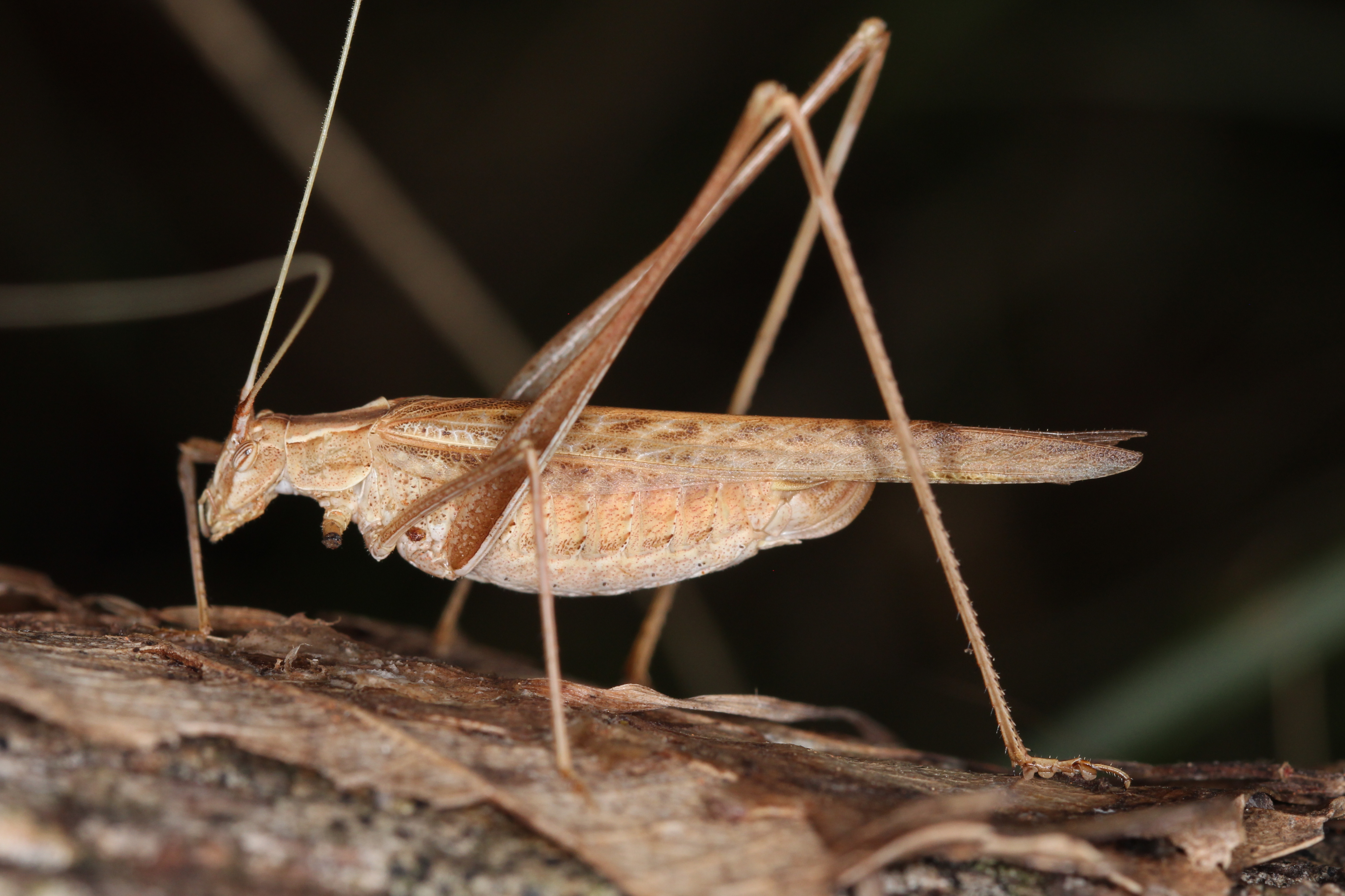
Video of Tylopsis lilifolia

Tylopsis lilifolia, also known as lily bush-cricket or white sickle bush-cricket, is a species of Orthopterans in the subfamily Phaneropterinae. It is found in Europe and Asia.

== Distribution and habitat ==
This species is present especially in southern Europe and it is widespread in the Mediterranean region. It can also be found in the Lebanon and Israel; and in the Caucasus. It mainly inhabits sunny meadows, shrubs and forest clearings.

== Description ==
The adult males grow up to 13–22 millimetres (0.51–0.87 in) long, while females can reach 16–23 millimetres (0.63–0.91 in) of length.

This species has two different forms of color. The basic coloration of the body varies from olive green or pale green to light brown with a brown-yellowish longitudinal band on the back. Head, legs and wings are green. The legs are long and thin, with small spines. The antennae are very long, they reach up to five times the body length. The ovipositor is about 4–5 millimetres (0.16–0.20 in) long and curved upward. In the dry grasslands it is common a brown form of the body.

== Biology ==
Adults can be encountered from August through October.
