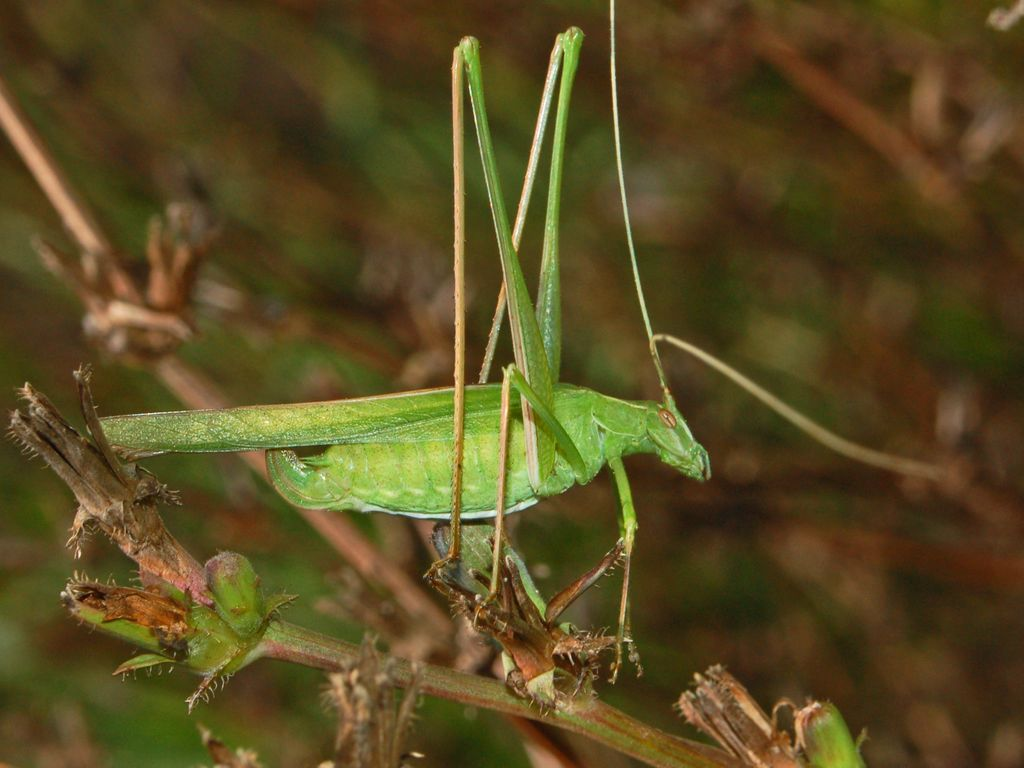
- Adult Tylopsis lilifolia

Scientific classification
- Domain: Eukaryota
- Kingdom: Animalia
- Phylum: Arthropoda
- Class: Insecta
- Order: Orthoptera
- Suborder: Ensifera
- Family: Tettigoniidae
- Subfamily: Phaneropterinae
- Tribe: Tylopsidini
- Genus: Tylopsis; Fieber, 1853

Synonyms
- Centrophorus Fischer von Waldheim, 1846

= Tylopsis =

Genus of cricket-like animals

Tylopsis is a genus of bush crickets in the subfamily Phaneropterinae and the monotypic tribe Tylopsidini. Species are found in mainland Europe, the Middle East and Africa.

== Species ==
The Orthoptera Species File lists:

1. Tylopsis ampla Ragge, 1964
2. Tylopsis bilineolata (Serville, 1838)
3. Tylopsis brevis Ragge, 1964
4. Tylopsis coi Jannone, 1936
5. Tylopsis continua (Walker, F., 1869)
6. Tylopsis dispar Sjöstedt, 1909
7. Tylopsis farrowi Ragge, 1972
8. Tylopsis fissa Ragge, 1964
9. Tylopsis gracilis Chopard, 1954
10. Tylopsis irregularis Karsch, 1893
11. Tylopsis lilifolia (Fabricius, 1793)
12. Tylopsis peneri Ragge, 1974
13. Tylopsis rubrescens Kirby, W.F., 1900 (synonym T. punctulata Kirby 1900)
