= Orthelimaea =

Scientific classification
- Kingdom: Animalia
- Phylum: Arthropoda
- Clade: Pancrustacea
- Class: Insecta
- Order: Orthoptera
- Suborder: Ensifera
- Family: Tettigoniidae
- Subfamily: Phaneropterinae
- Tribe: Ducetiini
- Genus: Orthelimaea; Karny, 1926

Type species
- Elimaea leeuwenii Karny, 1926

Genus of cricket-like animals

External image
- Images at iNaturalist

Orthelimaea is a genus of Asian bush crickets in the subfamily Phaneropterinae. Species in this genus are found in India, Indo-China, and Malesia.

== Description ==
Orthelimaea is now considered a separate genus in the tribe Ducetiini, having been described as a subgenus of the genus Elimaea. Species in this genus are characterised by the straight fore femora, whereas those of Elimaea and the genus Ectadia are "more or less curved". Ovipositors of the latter genera are similar, but are quite dissimilar in the type species of Orthelimaea, where the ovipositor has much larger denticles (tooth-like projections).

== Species ==
The Orthoptera Species File includes:

1. Orthelimaea bezborodovi Gorochov & Storozhenko, 2010
2. Orthelimaea carispina (Ingrisch & Shishodia, 1998)
3. Orthelimaea flavolineata (Brunner von Wattenwyl, 1878)
4. Orthelimaea himalayana (Ingrisch, 1990)
5. Orthelimaea insignis (Walker, 1869)
6. Orthelimaea kanburi Ingrisch, 2011
7. Orthelimaea klinghardti (Krausze, 1903)
8. Orthelimaea leeuwenii (Karny, 1926)
  — type species (locality: near Bangkok, Thailand)
9. Orthelimaea minor (Brunner von Wattenwyl, 1891)
10. Orthelimaea securigera (Brunner von Wattenwyl, 1878)
11. Orthelimaea trapezialis Liu, 2011
12. Orthelimaea volsella Ingrisch, 2011
