= Elimaea =

Elimaea can refer to:

- Elimiotis, a region in ancient Greece
- Elimaea, a genus of bush crickets or katydids
