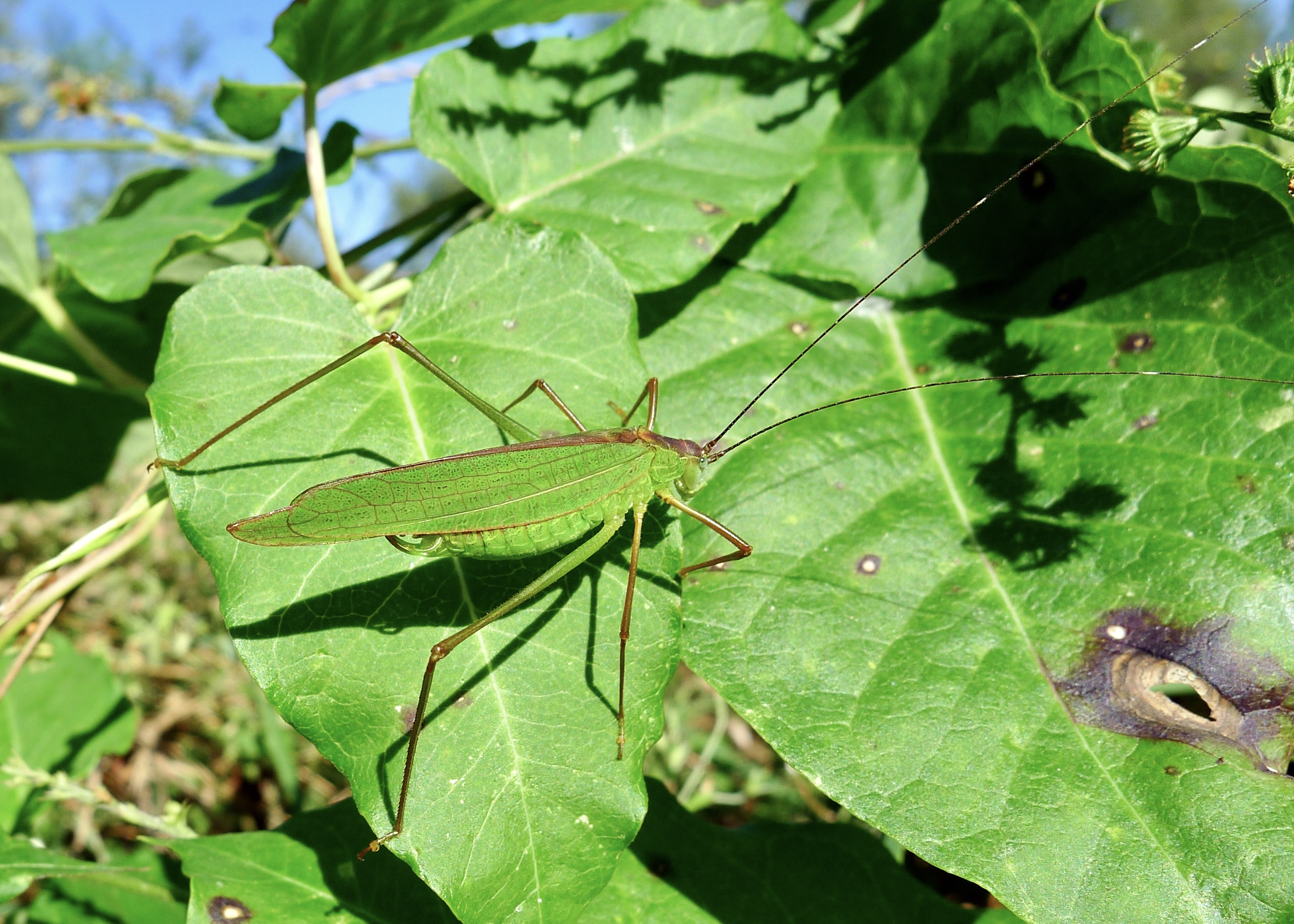
- Female from Primorsky Krai

Scientific classification
- Domain: Eukaryota
- Kingdom: Animalia
- Phylum: Arthropoda
- Class: Insecta
- Order: Orthoptera
- Suborder: Ensifera
- Family: Tettigoniidae
- Subfamily: Phaneropterinae
- Genus: Elimaea
- Species: E. fallax

Binomial name
- Elimaea fallax Bey-Bienko, 1951

= Elimaea fallax =

Species of cricket-like animal

Elimaea fallax is a species of katydid or bush cricket found in the Russian Far East (Primorsky Krai), eastern China and Korea. It was originally described in 1951.

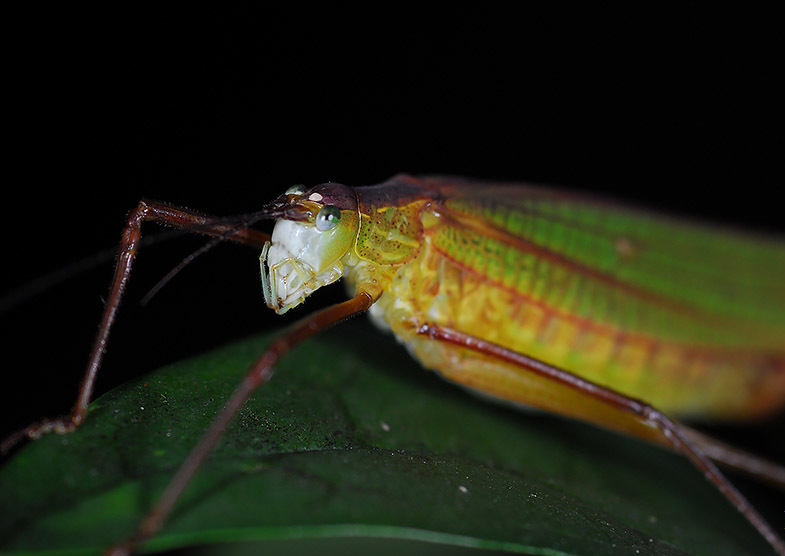
In Seosan, South Korea
