= Ectadia =

Scientific classification
- Kingdom: Animalia
- Phylum: Arthropoda
- Clade: Pancrustacea
- Class: Insecta
- Order: Orthoptera
- Suborder: Ensifera
- Family: Tettigoniidae
- Subfamily: Phaneropterinae
- Tribe: Elimaeini
- Genus: Ectadia; Brunner von Wattenwyl, 1878

Synonyms
- Ectatia Ingrisch, 1990

Genus of cricket-like animals

External image
- Image at iNaturalist

Ectadia is a genus of Asian bush crickets of the tribe Ducetiini (subfamily Phaneropterinae). Records are primarily from southern China and Indochina.

== Species ==
The Orthoptera Species File lists the following species:

1. Ectadia angusta Gorochov, 2009
2. Ectadia apicalis Liu, Kang & Liu, 2004
3. Ectadia diuturna Heller & Liu, 2017
4. Ectadia fulva Brunner von Wattenwyl, 1893
5. Ectadia mistshenkoi Gorochov, 2009
6. Ectadia obsolescens Liu, Kang & Liu, 2004
7. Ectadia pilosa Brunner von Wattenwyl, 1878 – type species
8. Ectadia sinuata Liu, Kang & Liu, 2004
9. Ectadia sulcata Xia & Liu, 1990
