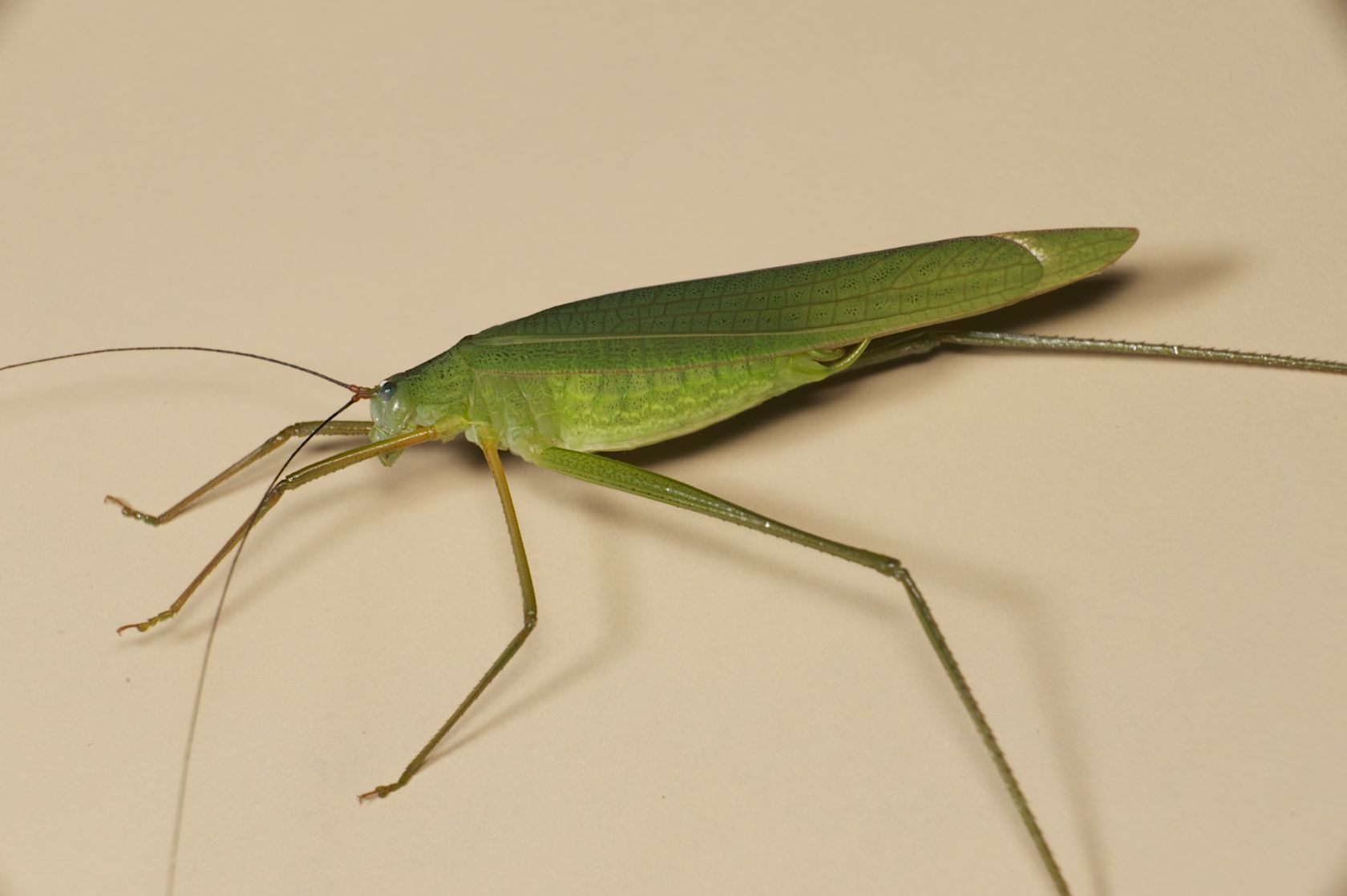
- Elimaea (Elimaea) punctifera in Hong Kong

Scientific classification
- Kingdom: Animalia
- Phylum: Arthropoda
- Clade: Pancrustacea
- Class: Insecta
- Order: Orthoptera
- Suborder: Ensifera
- Family: Tettigoniidae
- Subfamily: Phaneropterinae
- Tribe: Ducetiini
- Genus: Elimaea; Stål, 1874

Type species
- Phaneroptera subcarinata Stål, 1861

= Elimaea (katydid) =

Genus of cricket-like animals

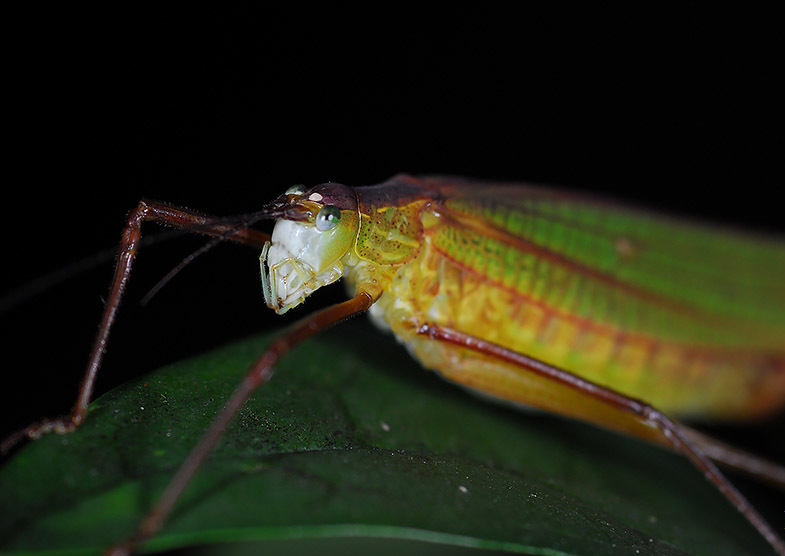
Elimaea (Elimaea) fallax

Elimaea is a large genus within Tettigoniidae, the bush cricket or katydid family. Species in this genus are found in India, southern China, Indo-China and Malesia.

The genus was erected in 1874 by Swedish entomologist Carl Stål (1833–1878) in his Recensio Orthopterorum. With over 130 described species, it is a widespread genus; now placed in the tribe Ducetiini, (previously Elimaeini in the subfamily Phaneropterinae).

== Species ==
This genus has nine subgenera and one species group:

Subgenus Bornelimaea Gorochov, 2009

1. Elimaea levi Gorochov, 2009
2. Elimaea sympatrica Gorochov, 2009

Subgenus Elimaea Stål, 1874

1. Elimaea annamensis Hebard, 1922
2. Elimaea berezovskii Bey-Bienko, 1951
3. Elimaea cangyuanensis Liu, 2011
4. Elimaea chloris (Haan, 1843)
5. Elimaea curta Gorochov, 2009
6. Elimaea fallax Bey-Bienko, 1951
7. Elimaea hoozanensis Karny, 1915
8. Elimaea lampu Ebner, 1934
9. Elimaea lanpingensis Liu, 2011
10. Elimaea macra (Serville, 1838)
11. Elimaea marmorata Brunner von Wattenwyl, 1878
12. Elimaea nautica Ingrisch, 1998
13. Elimaea paranautica Liu, 2011
14. Elimaea punctifera (Walker, 1869)
15. Elimaea quadrangulata Liu & Liu, 2011
16. Elimaea schmidti Krausze, 1903
17. Elimaea segregata Gorochov, 2009
18. Elimaea subcarinata (Stål, 1861)
  type species (syntype locality: Hong Kong; holotype - as synonym E. appendiculata Brunner von Wattenwyl, 1878 - is described as Indo-China: "Hinterindien")
19. Elimaea terminalis Liu, 1993
20. Elimaea thaii Ingrisch, 1998
21. Elimaea theopoldi Krausze, 1903
22. Elimaea triticifolia (Haan, 1843)
23. Elimaea wanningensis Liu, 2011

Subgenus Neoelimaea Gorochov, 2013

1. Elimaea melanocantha (Walker, 1869)
2. Elimaea nigrosignata Bolívar, 1900

Subgenus Poaefoliana Ingrisch, 2011

1. Elimaea albimaculata Ingrisch, 2011
2. Elimaea emlobata Wang & Shi, 2017
3. Elimaea jitra Ingrisch, 2011
4. Elimaea kutu Ingrisch, 2011
5. Elimaea upcurva Liu, 2011
6. Species group Elimaea poaefolia (Haan, 1843) – Malesia
  1. Elimaea jacobsonii Karny, 1926
  2. Elimaea poaefolia (Haan, 1843)
  3. Elimaea rosea Brunner von Wattenwyl, 1878

Subgenus Pseudectadia Gorochov, 2009

1. Elimaea grata Gorochov, 2009
2. Elimaea sonora Gorochov, 2009

Subgenus Rectielimaea Liu, 2011

1. Elimaea percauda Liu & Liu, 2011

Subgenus Rhaebelimaea Karny, 1926

1. Elimaea abdita Gorochov, 2009
2. Elimaea abramovi Gorochov, 2009
3. Elimaea abrupta Liu & Liu, 2011
4. Elimaea acuminata Wang & Shi, 2017
5. Elimaea adspersa Dohrn, 1906
6. Elimaea albovittata Liu & Liu, 2011
7. Elimaea alia Gorochov, 2009
8. Elimaea aphana Gorochov, 2009
9. Elimaea apicata Ingrisch, 1998
10. Elimaea aprilis Gorochov, 2011
11. Elimaea atrata Carl, 1914
12. Elimaea bakeri Hebard, 1922
13. Elimaea bavi Gorochov, 2009
14. Elimaea beibengensis Liu, 2011
15. Elimaea bengkulu Gorochov, 2009
16. Elimaea bispinosa Liu, 2004
17. Elimaea bona Gorochov, 2009
18. Elimaea borneo Gorochov, 2009
19. Elimaea brachycerciata Liu, 2011
20. Elimaea brachysterna Liu, 2011
21. Elimaea brevifissa Liu & Liu, 2011
22. Elimaea brevilamina Mu, He & Wang, 2002
23. Elimaea brunneri Dohrn, 1906
24. Elimaea catba Gorochov, 2009
25. Elimaea cheni Kang & Yang, 1992
26. Elimaea cognata Gorochov, 2009
27. Elimaea curvicercata Brunner von Wattenwyl, 1891
28. Elimaea curvicerciata Liu & Liu, 2011
29. Elimaea darevskyi Gorochov, 2009
30. Elimaea degressa Gorochov, 2009
31. Elimaea dongnai Gorochov, 2011
32. Elimaea elongata Wang & Shi, 2017
33. Elimaea expansa Wang & Shi, 2017
34. Elimaea filicauda Hebard, 1922
35. Elimaea foliata Mu, He & Wang, 1999
36. Elimaea fruhstorferi Gorochov, 2009
37. Elimaea gialai Gorochov, 2009
38. Elimaea guadunensis Liu, 2011
39. Elimaea hebardi Karny, 1926
40. Elimaea hunanensis Kang & Yang, 1992
41. Elimaea jambi Gorochov, 2009
42. Elimaea jianfenglingensis Liu, 2011
43. Elimaea junia Gorochov, 2009
44. Elimaea kerinci Gorochov, 2009
45. Elimaea kraussi Karny, 1926
46. Elimaea lii Kang & Yang, 1992
47. Elimaea longicercata Brunner von Wattenwyl, 1891
48. Elimaea longifissa Mu, He & Wang, 2002
49. Elimaea lyra Gorochov, 2013
50. Elimaea maculata Wang & Shi, 2017
51. Elimaea maichau Gorochov, 2009
52. Elimaea maja Gorochov, 2009
53. Elimaea malayica Karny, 1920
54. Elimaea maninjauensis Ingrisch, 1998
55. Elimaea megalopygmaea Mu, He & Wang, 1999
56. Elimaea mentaweii Ingrisch, 1998
57. Elimaea modesta Gorochov, 2009
58. Elimaea modiglianii Ingrisch, 1998
59. Elimaea moultoni Karny, 1923
60. Elimaea mucronatis Wang & Shi, 2017
61. Elimaea nanpingensis Liu, 2011
62. Elimaea neglecta Karny, 1926
63. Elimaea obtusilota Kang & Yang, 1992
64. Elimaea orlovi Gorochov, 2009
65. Elimaea parumpunctata (Serville, 1838)
66. Elimaea parva Liu, 1993
67. Elimaea pentaspina Ingrisch, 1998
68. Elimaea phetchaburi Gorochov, 2009
69. Elimaea pseudochloris Ingrisch, 1998
70. Elimaea puncticosta Bolívar, 1914
71. Elimaea quadrispina Liu, 2011
72. Elimaea recta Gorochov, 2009
73. Elimaea robinsoni Karny, 1926
74. Elimaea roseoalata Brunner von Wattenwyl, 1891
75. Elimaea ryabovi Gorochov, 2009
76. Elimaea sapa Gorochov, 2011
77. Elimaea saturata Wang & Shi, 2017
78. Elimaea schenklingi Karny, 1915
79. Elimaea semicirculata Kang & Yang, 1992
80. Elimaea semitubulosa Gorochov, 2009
81. Elimaea separata Gorochov, 2009
82. Elimaea setifera Bey-Bienko, 1962
83. Elimaea siamensis Karny, 1926
84. Elimaea signata Brunner von Wattenwyl, 1878
85. Elimaea simulata Gorochov, 2009
86. Elimaea spinigera Brunner von Wattenwyl, 1878
87. Elimaea subita Gorochov, 2009
88. Elimaea sumatrana Karny, 1926
89. Elimaea suratthani Gorochov, 2009
90. Elimaea tamdao Gorochov, 2009
91. Elimaea tenuicerca Liu & Liu, 2011
92. Elimaea tenuiuscula Gorochov, 2009
93. Elimaea tiankengensis Liu, 2011
94. Elimaea transversa (Ingrisch, 1990)
95. Elimaea trapeziformis Wang & Shi, 2017
96. Elimaea tuly Gorochov, 2009
97. Elimaea tympanalis (Matsumura & Shiraki, 1908)
98. Elimaea variegata Gorochov, 2009
99. Elimaea verrucosa Brunner von Wattenwyl, 1878
100. Elimaea vicinia Liu & Liu, 2011
101. Elimaea vinhphu Gorochov, 2009
102. Elimaea viridula Gorochov, 2009
103. Elimaea willemsei Karny, 1926
104. Elimaea yongningensis Liu, 2011

Subgenus Schizelimaea Gorochov, 2009

1. Elimaea ampla Gorochov, 2009
2. Elimaea bella Gorochov, 2009
3. Elimaea caricifolia (Haan, 1843)
4. Elimaea kinabalu Gorochov, 2013
5. Elimaea lamellipes Hebard, 1922
6. Elimaea lata Gorochov, 2009
7. Elimaea mira Gorochov, 2009
8. Elimaea pulchra Gorochov, 2009
9. Elimaea ranau Gorochov, 2009
10. Elimaea singgalang Ingrisch, 2011
11. Elimaea sinuata Ingrisch, 1998
12. Elimaea sukau Gorochov, 2013
13. Elimaea trusmadi Gorochov, 2009
14. Elimaea ulla Gorochov, 2009
15. Elimaea wartabone Gorochov, 2013

Subgenus Sulawimaea Gorochov, 2013

1. Elimaea inversa (Brunner von Wattenwyl, 1891)
2. Elimaea sulawesi (Gorochov, 2009)

Subgenus not allocated

1. Elimaea bidentata Brunner von Wattenwyl, 1878
2. Elimaea furca Gorochov, 2013
3. Elimaea grandis (Matsumura & Shiraki, 1908)
4. Elimaea storozhenkoi Gorochov, 2013
5. Elimaea yaeyamensis Ichikawa, 2004
