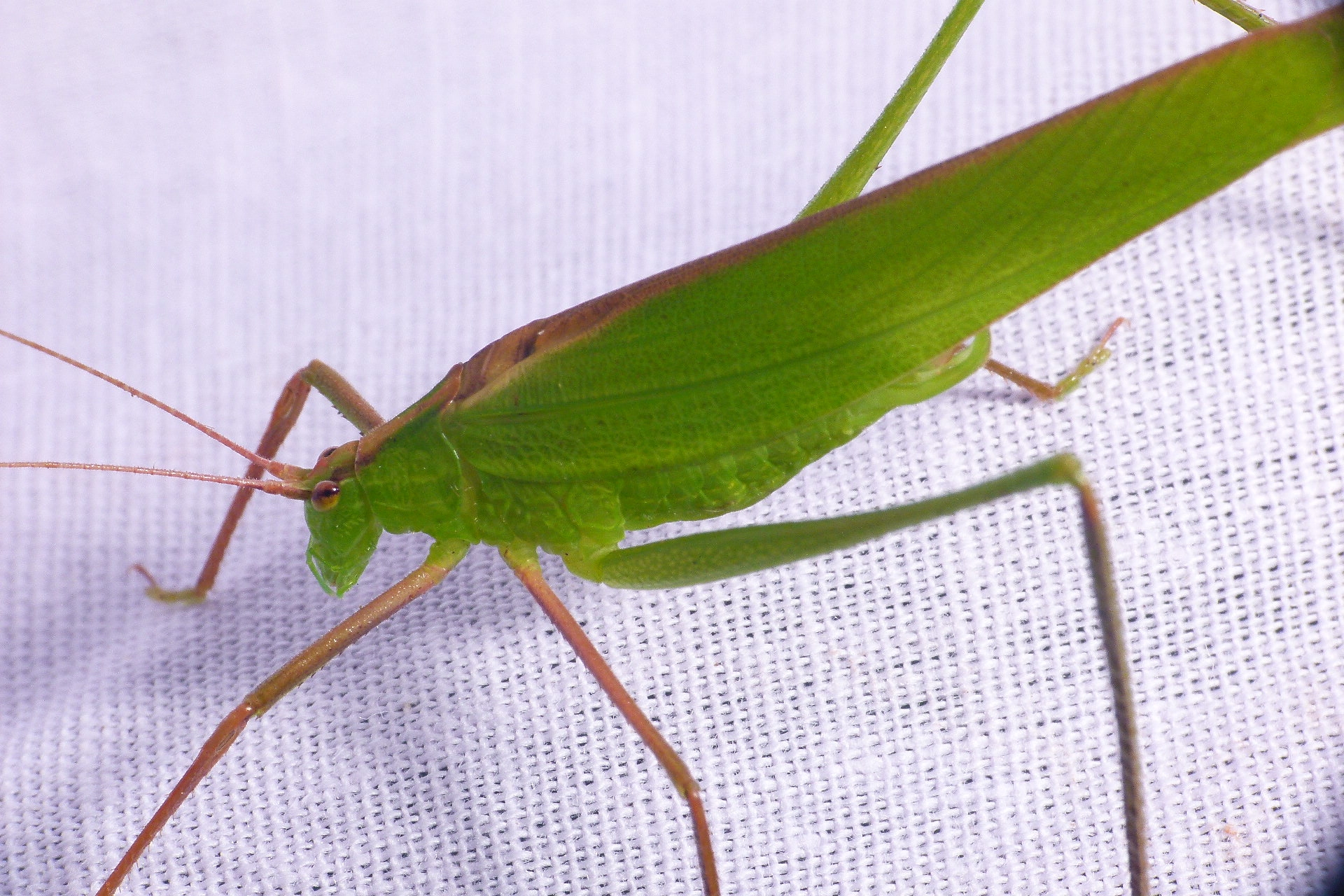
- Unknown Ducetia species

Scientific classification
- Domain: Eukaryota
- Kingdom: Animalia
- Phylum: Arthropoda
- Class: Insecta
- Order: Orthoptera
- Suborder: Ensifera
- Family: Tettigoniidae
- Subfamily: Phaneropterinae
- Tribe: Ducetiini
- Genus: Ducetia; Stål, 1874

Synonyms
- Epiphlebus Karsch, 1896; Paura Karsch, 1889; Pseudisotima Schulthess, 1898; Schubotzacris Rehn, 1914; Telaea Bolívar, 1922

= Ducetia =

Genus of cricket-like animals

Ducetia is the type genus of the Ducetiini: a tribe of bush crickets (subfamily Phaneropterinae). The genus was erected by Carl Stål and species have a widespread distribution in Africa, Asia and Australia.

== Species ==
The Orthoptera Species File lists:

- species group japonica (Thunberg, 1815)
1. Ducetia adspersa Brunner von Wattenwyl, 1878
2. Ducetia aliena (Walker, 1869)
3. Ducetia antipoda Rentz & Heller, 2017
4. Ducetia japonica (Thunberg, 1815) - type species (as "Locusta japonica" Thunberg)
5. Ducetia lanceolata (Walker, 1859)
6. Ducetia malayana Heller, 2017
7. Ducetia melodica Heller & Ingrisch, 2017
8. Ducetia neochlora (Walker, 1869)
9. Ducetia strelkovi Gorochov & Storozhenko, 1993
- species group not determined
1. Ducetia attenuata Xia & Liu, 1990
2. Ducetia biramosa (Karsch, 1889)
3. Ducetia boninensis Ishikawa, 1987
4. Ducetia borealis Gorochov & Kang, 2002
5. Ducetia ceylanica Brunner von Wattenwyl, 1878
6. Ducetia chelocerca Ragge, 1961
7. Ducetia costata Ragge, 1961
8. Ducetia crosskeyi Ragge, 1961
9. Ducetia crypteria (Karsch, 1896)
10. Ducetia dichotoma Ingrisch & Shishodia, 1998
11. Ducetia furcata Ragge, 1961
12. Ducetia fuscopunctata Chopard, 1954
13. Ducetia inerma Farooqi, Ahmed & Usmani, 2021
14. Ducetia javanica (Brunner von Wattenwyl, 1891)
15. Ducetia levatiala Ragge, 1980
16. Ducetia loosi Griffini, 1908
17. Ducetia macrocerca Ragge, 1961
18. Ducetia parva Ragge, 1961
19. Ducetia punctata (Schulthess, 1898)
20. Ducetia punctipennis (Gerstaecker, 1869)
21. Ducetia ramulosa Ragge, 1961
22. Ducetia ruspolii (Schulthess, 1898)
23. Ducetia sagitta Ragge, 1961
24. Ducetia serrata Nagar, Swaminathan & Mal, 2015
25. Ducetia spatula Ragge, 1961
26. Ducetia spina Chang, Lu & Shi, 2003
27. Ducetia triramosa Ingrisch, 1990
28. Ducetia unzenensis Yamasaki, 1983
29. Ducetia vitriala Ragge, 1961
30. Ducetia zagulajevi Gorochov, 2001
31. Ducetia zhengi Chang & Shi, 1999

== Gallery ==
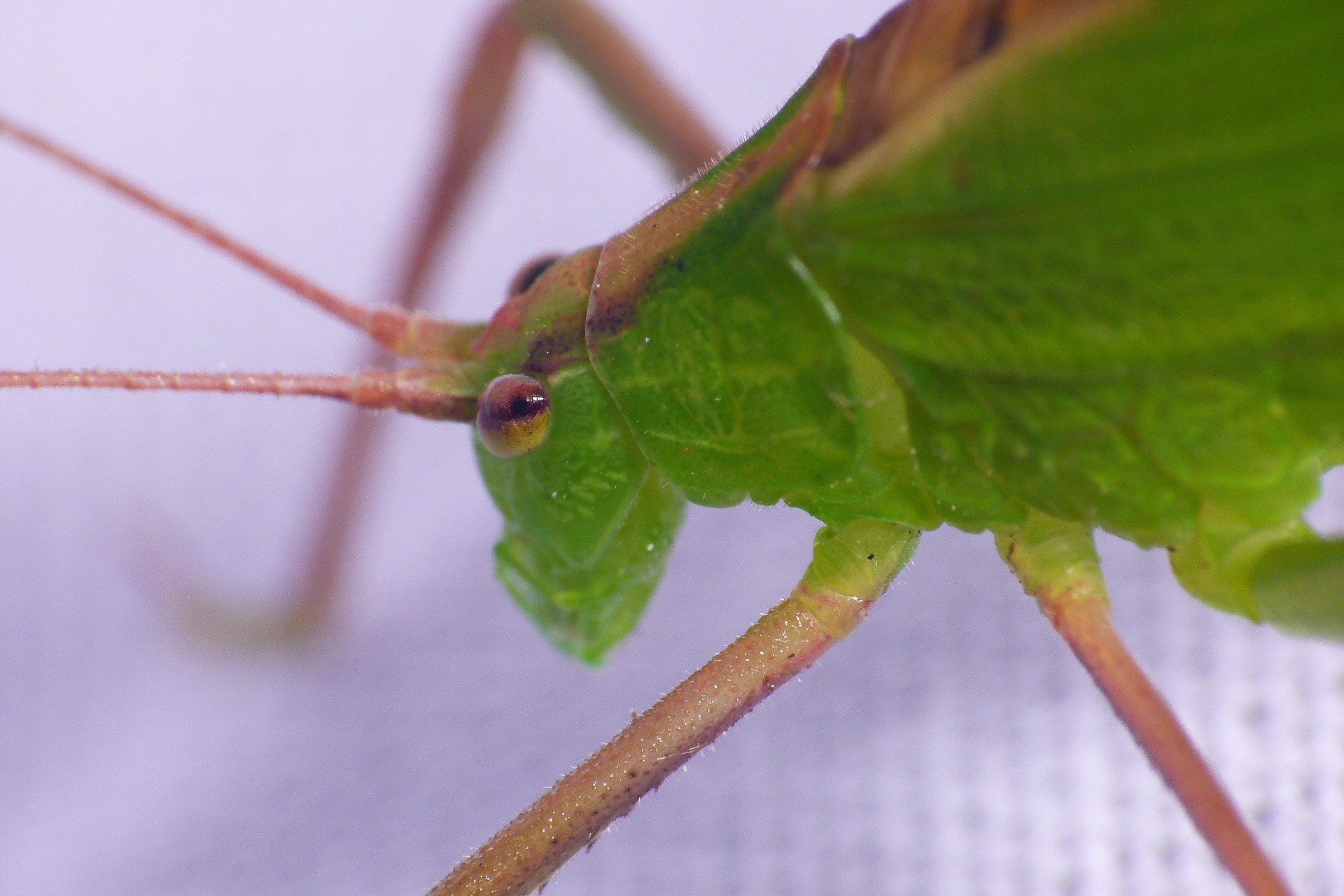
Unknown Ducetia species

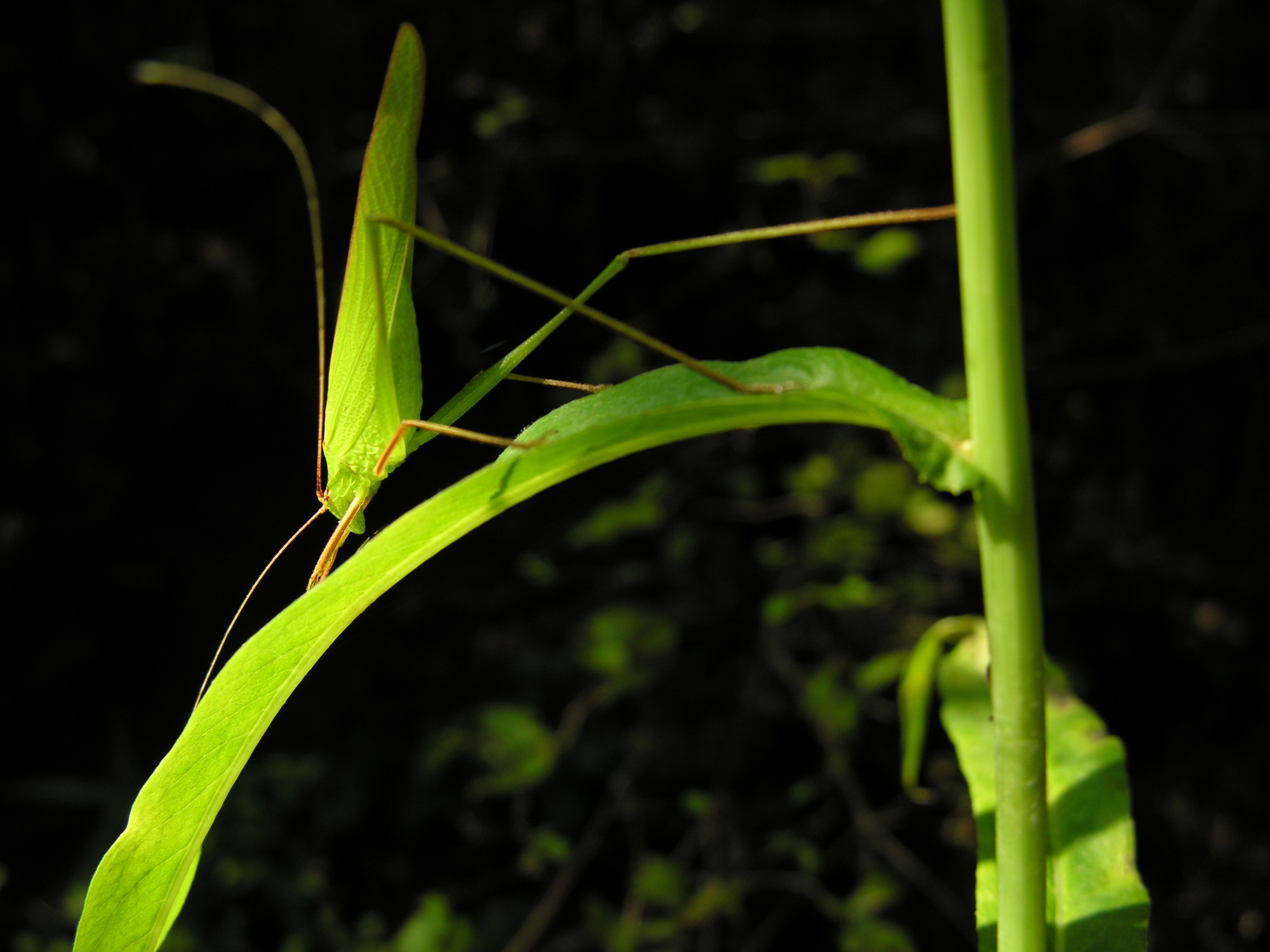
Unknown Ducetia species

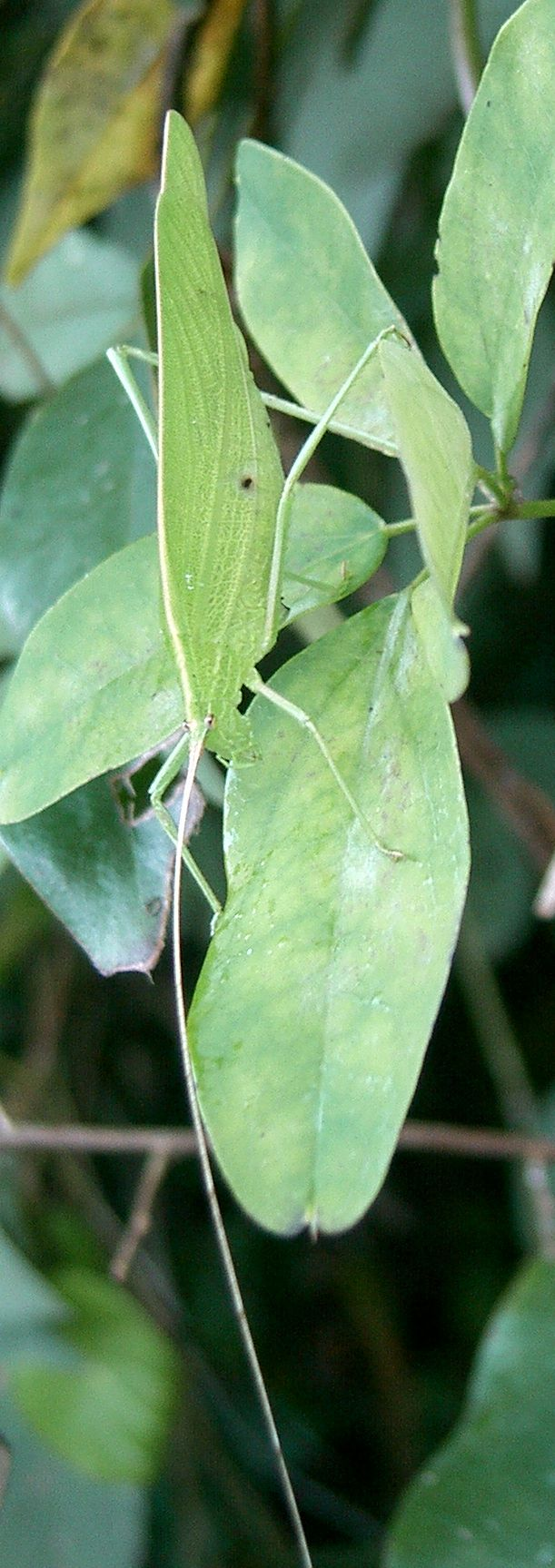
Ducetia japonica

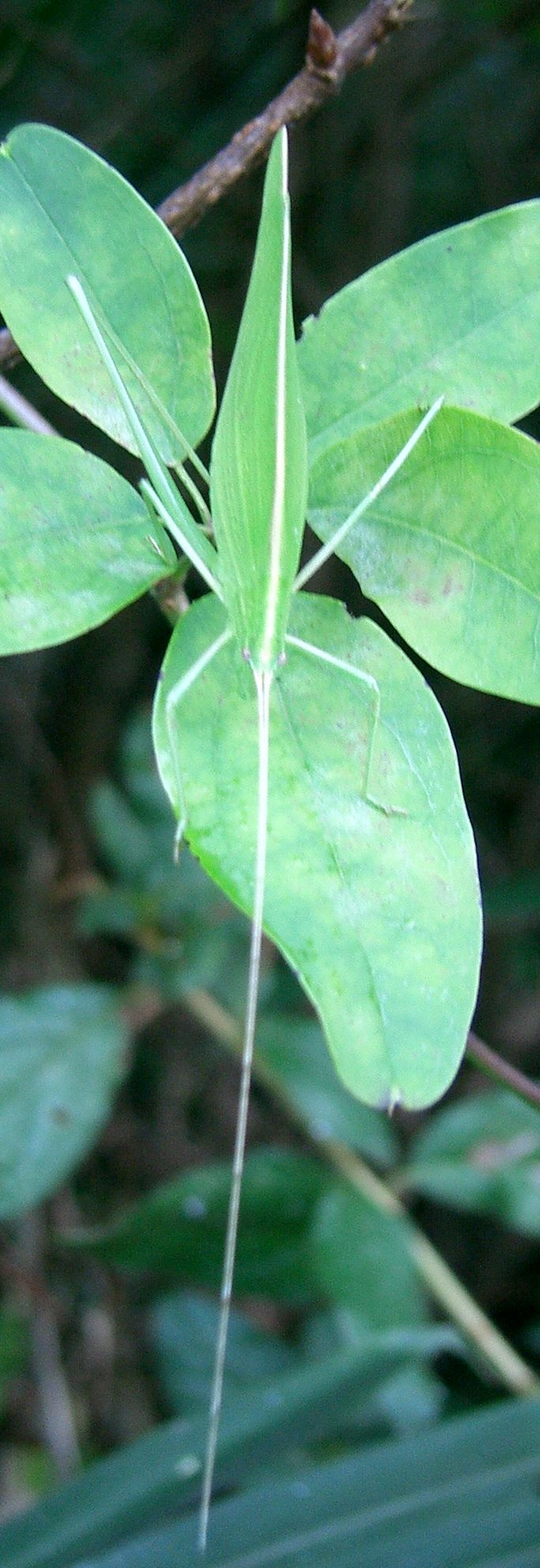
Ducetia japonica
