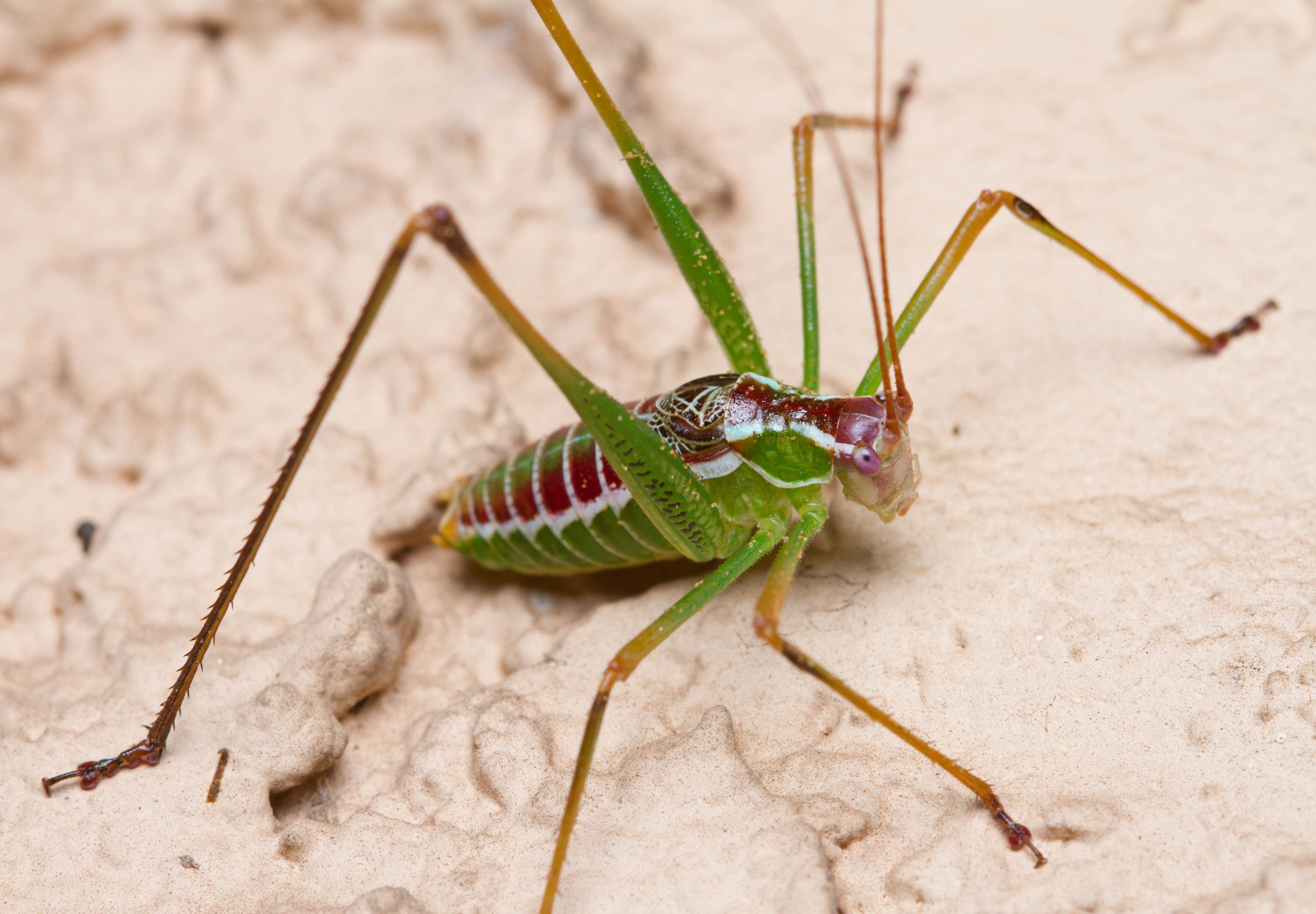
- Obolopteryx castanea

Scientific classification
- Kingdom: Animalia
- Phylum: Arthropoda
- Clade: Pancrustacea
- Class: Insecta
- Order: Orthoptera
- Suborder: Ensifera
- Family: Tettigoniidae
- Subfamily: Phaneropterinae
- Tribe: Odonturini
- Genus: Obolopteryx; Cohn, Swanson & Fontana, 2014

Synonyms
- Dichopetala

= Obolopteryx =

Genus of cricket-like animals

Obolopteryx is a North American genus of katydids or bush crickets in the subfamily Phaneropterinae and tribe Dichopetalini.

== Species ==
The Orthoptera Species File lists:

- Obolopteryx brevihastata (Morse, 1902)
- Obolopteryx castanea (Rehn & Hebard, 1914)
- Obolopteryx catinata (Rehn & Hebard, 1914)
- Obolopteryx emarginata (Brunner von Wattenwyl, 1878)
  type species (as Dichopetala emarginata)
- Obolopteryx eurycerca Barrientos-Lozano & Rocha-Sánchez, 2016
- Obolopteryx gladiator (Rehn & Hebard, 1914)
- Obolopteryx huastecana Barrientos-Lozano & Rocha-Sánchez, 2016
- Obolopteryx nigra Barrientos-Lozano & Rocha-Sánchez, 2016
- Obolopteryx oreoeca (Rehn & Hebard, 1914)
- Obolopteryx poecila (Hebard, 1932)
- Obolopteryx seeversi (Strohecker, 1941)
- Obolopteryx tamaholipana Barrientos-Lozano & Rocha-Sánchez, 2016
- Obolopteryx tanchipae Barrientos-Lozano & Rocha-Sánchez, 2016
- Obolopteryx truncoangulata Barrientos-Lozano & Rocha-Sánchez, 2015
