= Obolopteryx emarginata =

Scientific classification
- Kingdom: Animalia
- Phylum: Arthropoda
- Clade: Pancrustacea
- Class: Insecta
- Order: Orthoptera
- Suborder: Ensifera
- Family: Tettigoniidae
- Subfamily: Phaneropterinae
- Tribe: Odonturini
- Genus: Obolopteryx
- Species: O. emarginata

Binomial name
- Obolopteryx emarginata (Brunner, 1878)

Synonyms
- Dichopetala emarginata Brunner, 1878

Species of cricket-like animal

Obolopteryx emarginata (synonym Dichopetala emarginata), the spoon-tail short-wing katydid (family Tettigoniidae) is the type species of phaneropterine katydids of its genus. It is found in North America.
