= Dichopetala catinata =

Scientific classification
- Kingdom: Animalia
- Phylum: Arthropoda
- Clade: Pancrustacea
- Class: Insecta
- Order: Orthoptera
- Suborder: Ensifera
- Family: Tettigoniidae
- Subfamily: Phaneropterinae
- Tribe: Odonturini
- Genus: Obolopteryx
- Species: O. catinata

Binomial name
- Obolopteryx catinata Rehn & Hebard, 1914

Species of insect

Dichopetala catinata, the spoon-tailed short-wing katydid, is a species of phaneropterine katydid in the family Tettigoniidae. It is found in North America.
