= Dichopetala brevihastata =

Scientific classification
- Domain: Eukaryota
- Kingdom: Animalia
- Phylum: Arthropoda
- Class: Insecta
- Order: Orthoptera
- Suborder: Ensifera
- Family: Tettigoniidae
- Subfamily: Phaneropterinae
- Tribe: Odonturini
- Genus: Obolopteryx
- Species: O. brevihastata

Binomial name
- Obolopteryx brevihastata Morse, 1902

Species of cricket-like animal

Dichopetala brevihastata, the common short-wing katydid, is a species of phaneropterine katydid in the family Tettigoniidae. It is found in North America.
