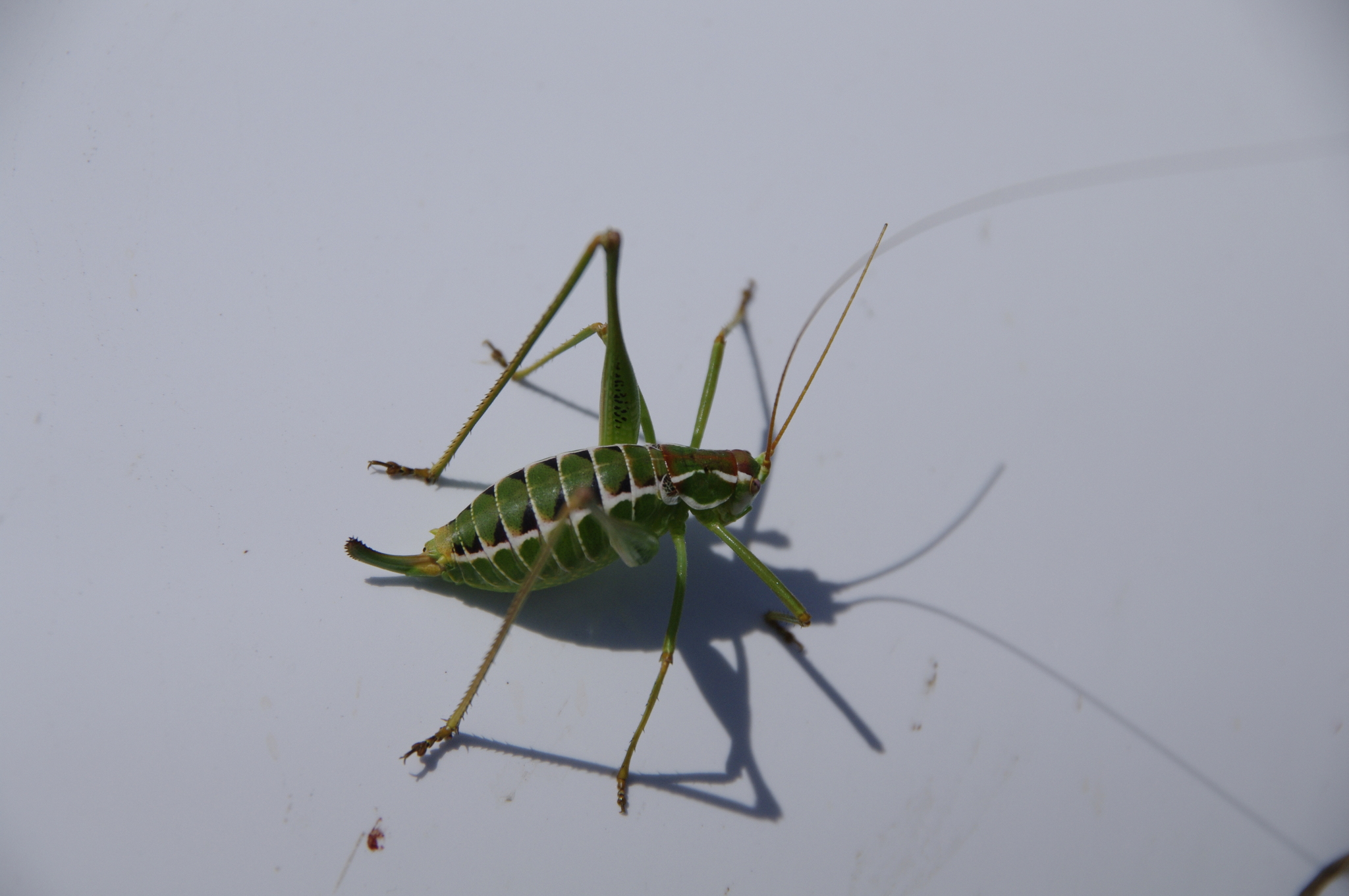

Scientific classification
- Kingdom: Animalia
- Phylum: Arthropoda
- Clade: Pancrustacea
- Class: Insecta
- Order: Orthoptera
- Suborder: Ensifera
- Family: Tettigoniidae
- Subfamily: Phaneropterinae
- Tribe: Odonturini
- Genus: Obolopteryx
- Species: O. oreoeca

Binomial name
- Obolopteryx oreoeca (Rehn & Hebard, 1914)

Synonyms
- Dichopetala oreoeca Rehn & Hebard, 1914

= Obolopteryx oreoeca =

Species of cricket-like animal

Obolopteryx oreoeca, commonly known as the mountain-dwelling short-winged katydid, is a species of phaneropterine katydid in the family Tettigoniidae. It is found in North America.
