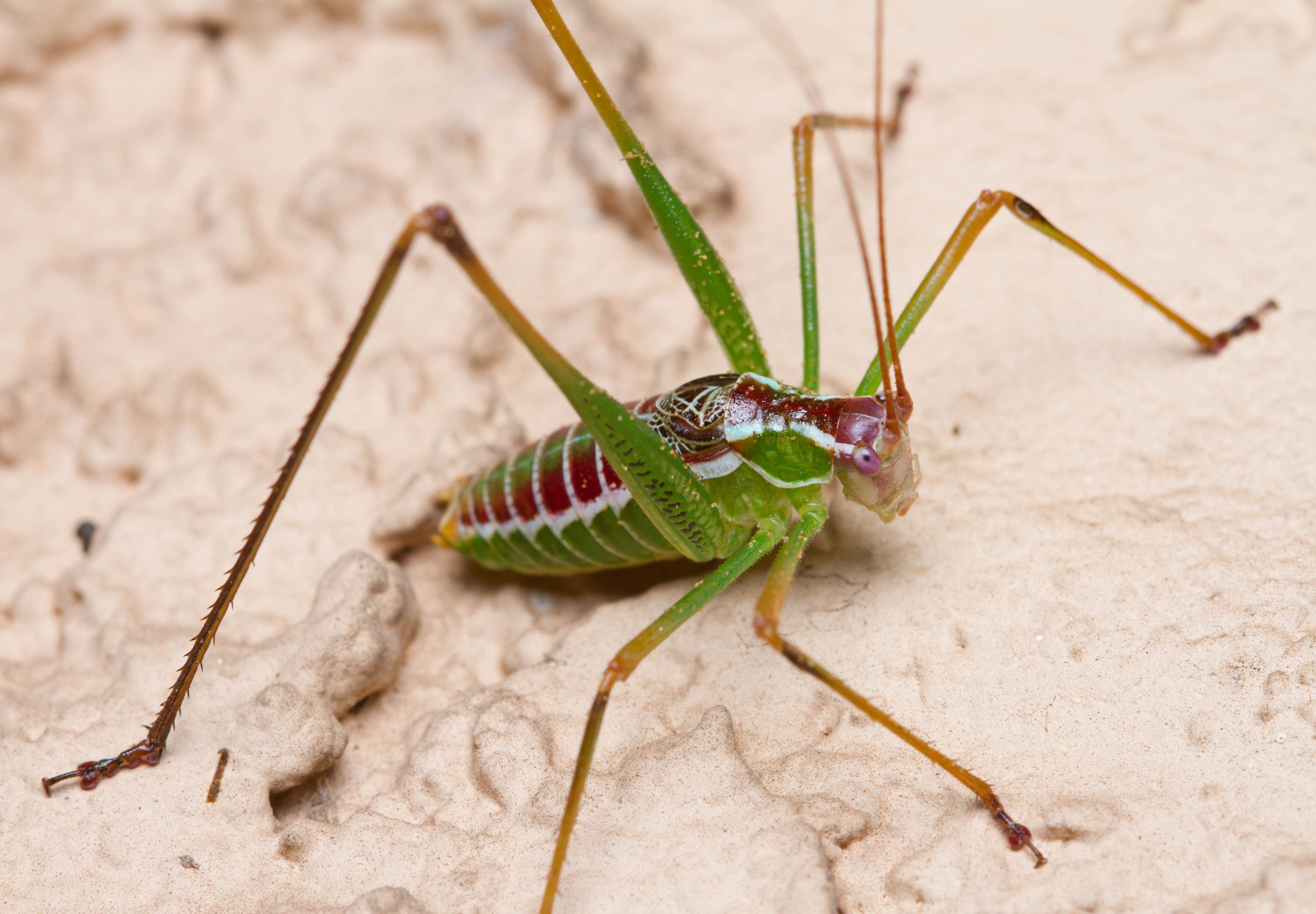

Scientific classification
- Domain: Eukaryota
- Kingdom: Animalia
- Phylum: Arthropoda
- Class: Insecta
- Order: Orthoptera
- Suborder: Ensifera
- Family: Tettigoniidae
- Subfamily: Phaneropterinae
- Tribe: Odonturini
- Genus: Obolopteryx
- Species: O. castanea

Binomial name
- Obolopteryx castanea (Rehn & Hebard, 1914)

Synonyms
- Dichopetala castanea Rehn & Hebard, 1914

= Obolopteryx castanea =

Species of cricket-like animal

Obolopteryx castanea, the chestnut short-wing katydid, is a species of phaneropterine katydid in the family Tettigoniidae. It is found in North America.
