= Dichopetala =

Scientific classification
- Kingdom: Animalia
- Phylum: Arthropoda
- Clade: Pancrustacea
- Class: Insecta
- Order: Orthoptera
- Suborder: Ensifera
- Family: Tettigoniidae
- Subfamily: Phaneropterinae
- Tribe: Dichopetalini
- Genus: Dichopetala; Brunner von Wattenwyl, 1878

Genus of cricket-like animals

Dichopetala is a genus of Mexican short-wing katydids in the subfamily Phaneropterinae and typical of the tribe Dichopetalini.

== Species ==
As of August 2026 OSF includes:

1. Dichopetala femorata Cisneros-Barrios, Salinas-Moreno & Zuñiga-Bermudez, 1990
2. Dichopetala mexicana Brunner von Wattenwyl, 1878 - type species
