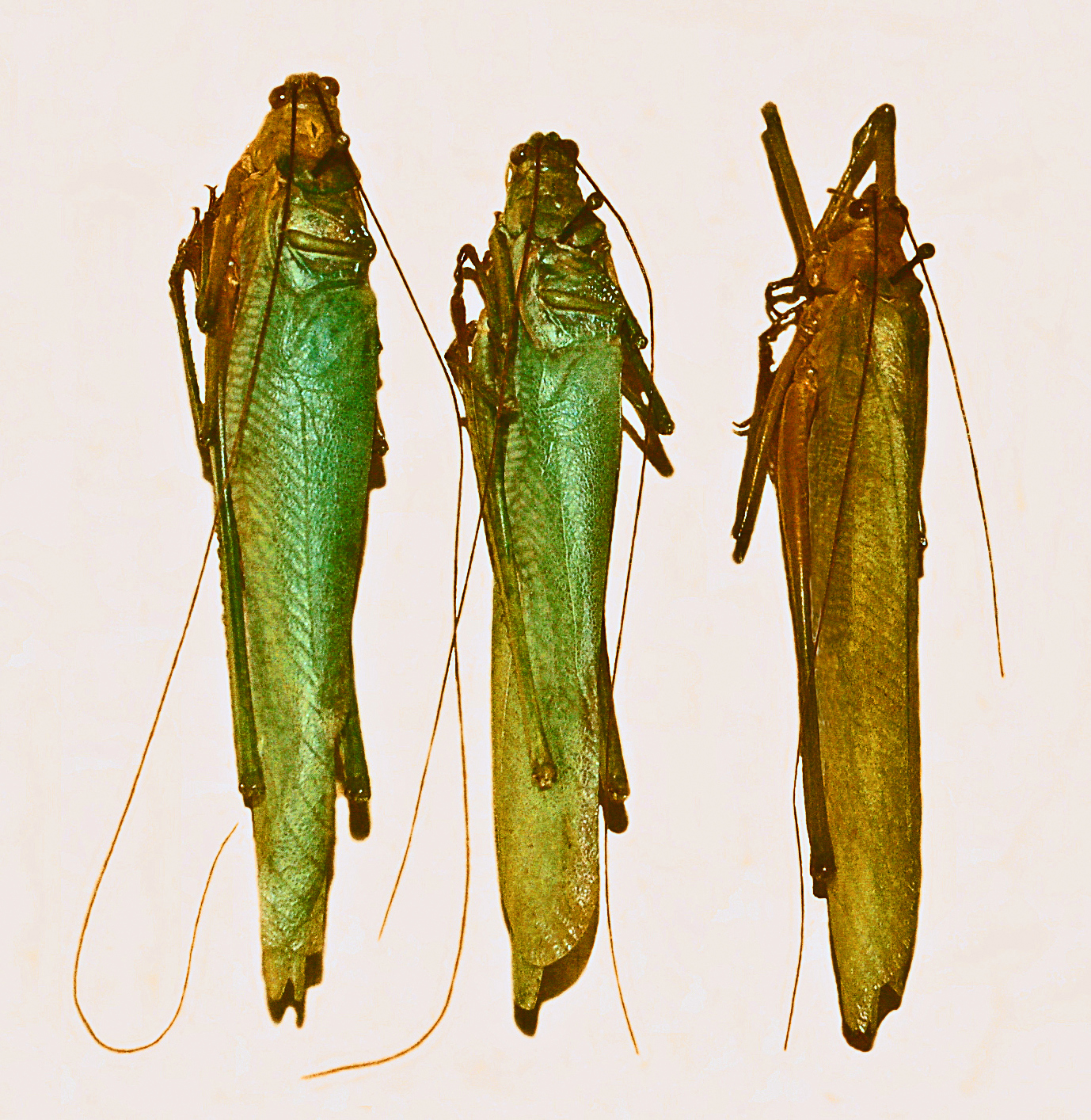
- Zeuneria melanopeza, male and female, from Fernando Po Island. Mounted specimen

Scientific classification
- Domain: Eukaryota
- Kingdom: Animalia
- Phylum: Arthropoda
- Class: Insecta
- Order: Orthoptera
- Suborder: Ensifera
- Family: Tettigoniidae
- Subfamily: Phaneropterinae
- Genus: Zeuneria
- Species: Z. melanopeza

Binomial name
- Zeuneria melanopeza Karsch, 1889

= Zeuneria melanopeza =

Species of cricket-like animal

Zeuneria melanopeza is a species of insect in the family Tettigoniidae subfamily Phaneropterinae.

== Description ==
These green, leaf-like insects are among the largest winged katydids.

== Distribution ==
This species can be found in West-Central Tropical Africa (Cameroon, Equatorial Guinea, Fernando Po Island).

== Bibliography ==
- Karsch. 1889. Orthopterologische Beiträge III. Berliner Entomologische Zeitschrift (Berlin Ent. Z. ) 32:415-464
- Kirby, W.F. (1906) Orthoptera Saltatoria. Part I. (Achetidae et Phasgonuridae.), A Synonymic Catalogue of Orthoptera (Orthoptera Saltatoria, Locustidae vel Acridiidae), British Museum (Natural History), London 2:i-viii, 1-562
- Bruner, L. (1920[1919]) Orthoptera from Africa, being a report upon some Saltatoria mainly from Cameroon contained in the Carnegie Museum, Annals of the Carnegie Museum 13:92-142
- Karsch (1890) Neue westafrikansiche durch Herrn Premierlieutenant Morgen von Kribi eingesendete Orthopteren, Entomologische Nachrichten Berlin (Entom. Nachricht. Berlin) 16:257-276
- Brunner von Wattenwyl (1891) Additamenta zur Monographie der Phaneropteriden, Verhandlungen der Kaiserlich-Königlichen Zoologisch-Botanischen Gesellschaft in Wien (Verh. der Zoologisch-Botanischen Gesellsch. Wien) 41:1-196, pl. 1-2
- Griffini (1906) Ortotteri raccolti da Leonardo Fea nell'Africa occidentale. 1. Hetrodidi, Conocephalidi, Meconemidi, Pseudophyllidi, Mecopodidi e Fanerotteridi, Annali del Museo Civico di Storia Naturale 'Giacomo Doria', Genova (Ann. Mus. Civ. Stor. Nat. Genova) 3(2):358–397
- Sjöstedt In Schouteden (1929) Voyage au Congo de S. A. R. le Prince Leopold de Belgique 1925, Revue de Zoologie et de Botanique Africaines (Rev. Zool. Bot. Afr.) 17:1-252, 1 map, figs.
- Ragge (1968) An index-catalogue of African Phaneropterinae (Orthoptera: Tettigoniidae), Bulletin of the British Museum (Natural History) Entomology (Bull. Br. Mus. (Nat. Hist.) *nt.) 22(3):75-108
- Griffini (1908) Phasgonuridae africane del R. Museo di Storia Naturale di Bruxelles. 5 Phaneropteridae, pars 1, Mémoires de la Société entomologique de Belgique (Mem. Soc. entom. Belgique, Bruxelles) 15:74-86
