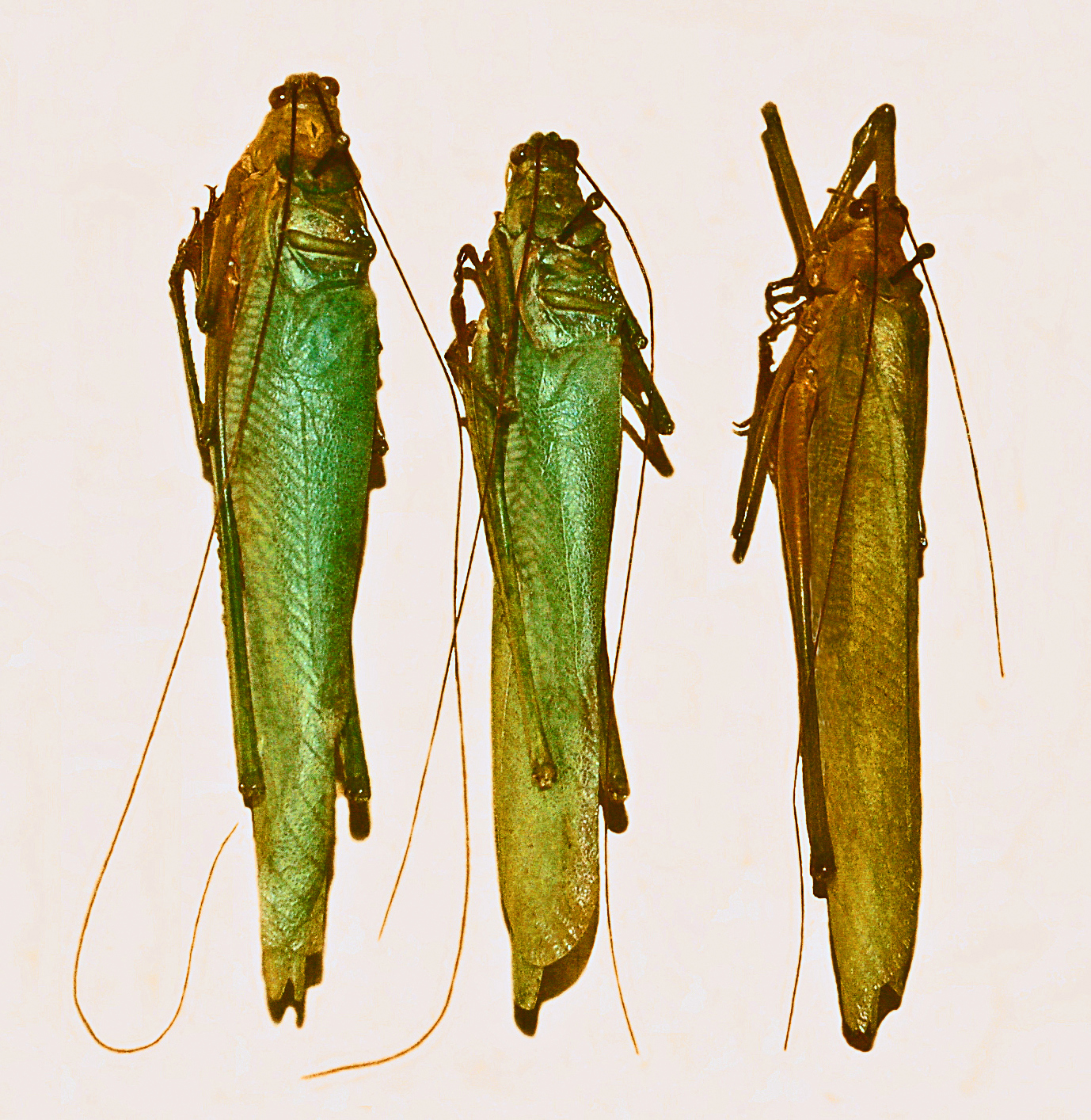
- Zeuneria melanopeza

Scientific classification
- Domain: Eukaryota
- Kingdom: Animalia
- Phylum: Arthropoda
- Class: Insecta
- Order: Orthoptera
- Suborder: Ensifera
- Family: Tettigoniidae
- Subfamily: Phaneropterinae
- Tribe: Zeuneriini
- Genus: Zeuneria; Karsch, 1889

= Zeuneria =

Genus of cricket-like animals

Zeuneria is a genus of African bush crickets in the subfamily Phaneropterinae and is the type genus of the tribe Zeuneriini.

== Species ==
The Orthoptera species file includes:

1. Zeuneria biramosa Sjöstedt, 1929
2. Zeuneria centralis Rehn, J.A.G., 1914
3. Zeuneria longicercus Sjöstedt, 1929
4. Zeuneria melanopeza Karsch, 1889 - type species
