= Arethaea grallator =

Scientific classification
- Domain: Eukaryota
- Kingdom: Animalia
- Phylum: Arthropoda
- Class: Insecta
- Order: Orthoptera
- Suborder: Ensifera
- Family: Tettigoniidae
- Subfamily: Phaneropterinae
- Tribe: Insarini
- Genus: Arethaea
- Species: A. grallator

Binomial name
- Arethaea grallator (Scudder, 1877)

Species of cricket-like animal

Arethaea grallator, the stilt-walker katydid, is a species of phaneropterine katydid in the family Tettigoniidae. It is found in North America.
