= Arethaea =

Scientific classification
- Kingdom: Animalia
- Phylum: Arthropoda
- Clade: Pancrustacea
- Class: Insecta
- Order: Orthoptera
- Suborder: Ensifera
- Family: Tettigoniidae
- Subfamily: Phaneropterinae
- Tribe: Insarini
- Genus: Arethaea; Stål, 1876

Genus of cricket-like animals

Arethaea is a genus of katydids in the family Tettigoniidae. There are at least 14 described species in Arethaea.

== Species ==
- Arethaea ambulator Hebard, 1936 (hill country thread-leg katydid)
- Arethaea arachnopyga Rehn & Hebard, 1914 (big bend thread-leg katydid)
- Arethaea brevicauda (Scudder, 1900) (California thread-leg katydid)
- Arethaea carita Scudder, 1902 (Carita thread-leg katydid)
- Arethaea constricta Brunner, 1878 (prairie thread-leg katydid)
- Arethaea coyotero Hebard, 1935 (Mojave thread-leg katydid)
- Arethaea gracilipes (Thomas, 1870) (thin-footed thread-leg katydid)
- Arethaea grallator (Scudder, 1877) (stilt-walker katydid)
- Arethaea mescalero Hebard, 1936 (mescalero thread-leg katydid)
- Arethaea phalangium (Scudder, 1877) (eastern thread-leg katydid)
- Arethaea phantasma Rehn & Hebard, 1914 (Rio Grande thread-leg katydid)
- Arethaea polingi Hebard, 1935 (Poling's thread-legged katydid)
- Arethaea sellata Rehn, 1907 (sellate thread-leg katydid)
- Arethaea semialata Rehn & Hebard, 1914 (chihuahuan thread-leg katydid)
