= Arethaea arachnopyga =

Scientific classification
- Kingdom: Animalia
- Phylum: Arthropoda
- Class: Insecta
- Order: Orthoptera
- Suborder: Ensifera
- Family: Tettigoniidae
- Subfamily: Phaneropterinae
- Tribe: Insarini
- Genus: Arethaea
- Species: A. arachnopyga

Binomial name
- Arethaea arachnopyga Rehn & Hebard, 1914

Species of cricket-like animal

Arethaea arachnopyga, known generally as the big bend thread-leg katydid or spider-tail thread-legged katydid, is a species of phaneropterine katydid belonging to the Tettigoniidae family. It is found in North America.
