= Arethaea sellata =

Scientific classification
- Kingdom: Animalia
- Phylum: Arthropoda
- Clade: Pancrustacea
- Class: Insecta
- Order: Orthoptera
- Suborder: Ensifera
- Family: Tettigoniidae
- Subfamily: Phaneropterinae
- Tribe: Insarini
- Genus: Arethaea
- Species: A. sellata

Binomial name
- Arethaea sellata Rehn, 1907

Species of cricket-like animal

Arethaea sellata, the sellate thread-leg katydid, is a species of phaneropterine katydid in the family Tettigoniidae. It is found in North America.
