= Arethaea phalangium =

Scientific classification
- Domain: Eukaryota
- Kingdom: Animalia
- Phylum: Arthropoda
- Class: Insecta
- Order: Orthoptera
- Suborder: Ensifera
- Family: Tettigoniidae
- Subfamily: Phaneropterinae
- Genus: Arethaea
- Species: A. phalangium

Binomial name
- Arethaea phalangium (Scudder, S.H. 1877)

Species of cricket-like animal

Arethaea phalangium is a species in the family Tettigoniidae ("katydids"), in the order Orthoptera ("grasshoppers, crickets, katydids"). The species is known generally as the "eastern thread-leg katydid". It is found in North America.
