= Arethaea semialata =

Scientific classification
- Domain: Eukaryota
- Kingdom: Animalia
- Phylum: Arthropoda
- Class: Insecta
- Order: Orthoptera
- Suborder: Ensifera
- Family: Tettigoniidae
- Subfamily: Phaneropterinae
- Tribe: Insarini
- Genus: Arethaea
- Species: A. semialata

Binomial name
- Arethaea semialata Rehn & Hebard, 1914

Species of cricket-like animal

Arethaea semialata, known generally as the chihuahuan thread-leg katydid or semi-alate thread-legged katydid, is a species of phaneropterine katydid in the family Tettigoniidae. It is found in North America.
