= Arethaea carita =

Scientific classification
- Domain: Eukaryota
- Kingdom: Animalia
- Phylum: Arthropoda
- Class: Insecta
- Order: Orthoptera
- Suborder: Ensifera
- Family: Tettigoniidae
- Subfamily: Phaneropterinae
- Tribe: Insarini
- Genus: Arethaea
- Species: A. carita

Binomial name
- Arethaea carita Scudder, 1902

Species of cricket-like animal

Arethaea carita, the Carita thread-leg katydid, is a species of phaneropterine katydid in the family Tettigoniidae. It is found in North America.
