= Arethaea constricta =

Scientific classification
- Domain: Eukaryota
- Kingdom: Animalia
- Phylum: Arthropoda
- Class: Insecta
- Order: Orthoptera
- Suborder: Ensifera
- Family: Tettigoniidae
- Subfamily: Phaneropterinae
- Tribe: Insarini
- Genus: Arethaea
- Species: A. constricta

Binomial name
- Arethaea constricta Brunner, 1878

Species of cricket-like animal

Arethaea constricta, known generally as the prairie thread-leg katydid or constricted thread-leg katydid, is a species of phaneropterine katydid in the family Tettigoniidae. It is found in North America.

== Subspecies ==
These two subspecies belong to the species Arethaea constricta:

- Arethaea constricta comanche Hebard, 1936
- Arethaea constricta constricta Brunner von Wattenwyl, 1878
