= Arethaea phantasma =

- Rio Grande Thread-leg Katydid (Arethaea phantasma) in the United States

Scientific classification
- Kingdom: Animalia
- Phylum: Arthropoda
- Clade: Pancrustacea
- Class: Insecta
- Order: Orthoptera
- Suborder: Ensifera
- Family: Tettigoniidae
- Subfamily: Phaneropterinae
- Tribe: Insarini
- Genus: Arethaea
- Species: A. phantasma

Binomial name
- Arethaea phantasma Rehn & Hebard, 1914

Species of cricket-like animal

Arethaea phantasma, known generally as the Rio Grande thread-leg katydid or Rio Grande catydid, is a species of phaneropterine katydid in the family Tettigoniidae. It is found in North America.
