= Arethaea gracilipes =

- in Colorado, U.S.

Scientific classification
- Kingdom: Animalia
- Phylum: Arthropoda
- Clade: Pancrustacea
- Class: Insecta
- Order: Orthoptera
- Suborder: Ensifera
- Family: Tettigoniidae
- Subfamily: Phaneropterinae
- Tribe: Insarini
- Genus: Arethaea
- Species: A. gracilipes

Binomial name
- Arethaea gracilipes (Thomas, 1870)

Species of cricket-like animal

Arethaea gracilipes, the thin-footed thread-leg katydid, is a species of phaneropterine katydid in the family Tettigoniidae. It is found in North America.

== Subspecies ==
These three subspecies belong to the species Arethaea gracilipes:

- Arethaea gracilipes cerciata Hebard, 1936^{i c g}
- Arethaea gracilipes gracilipes (Thomas, 1870)^{i c g}
- Arethaea gracilipes papago Hebard, 1935^{i c g}

Data sources: i = ITIS, c = Catalogue of Life, g = GBIF, b = Bugguide.net
