= Arethaea mescalero =

Scientific classification
- Domain: Eukaryota
- Kingdom: Animalia
- Phylum: Arthropoda
- Class: Insecta
- Order: Orthoptera
- Suborder: Ensifera
- Family: Tettigoniidae
- Subfamily: Phaneropterinae
- Tribe: Insarini
- Genus: Arethaea
- Species: A. mescalero

Binomial name
- Arethaea mescalero Hebard, 1936

Species of cricket-like animal

Arethaea mescalero, the mescalero thread-leg katydid, is a species of phaneropterine katydid in the family Tettigoniidae. It is found in North America.
