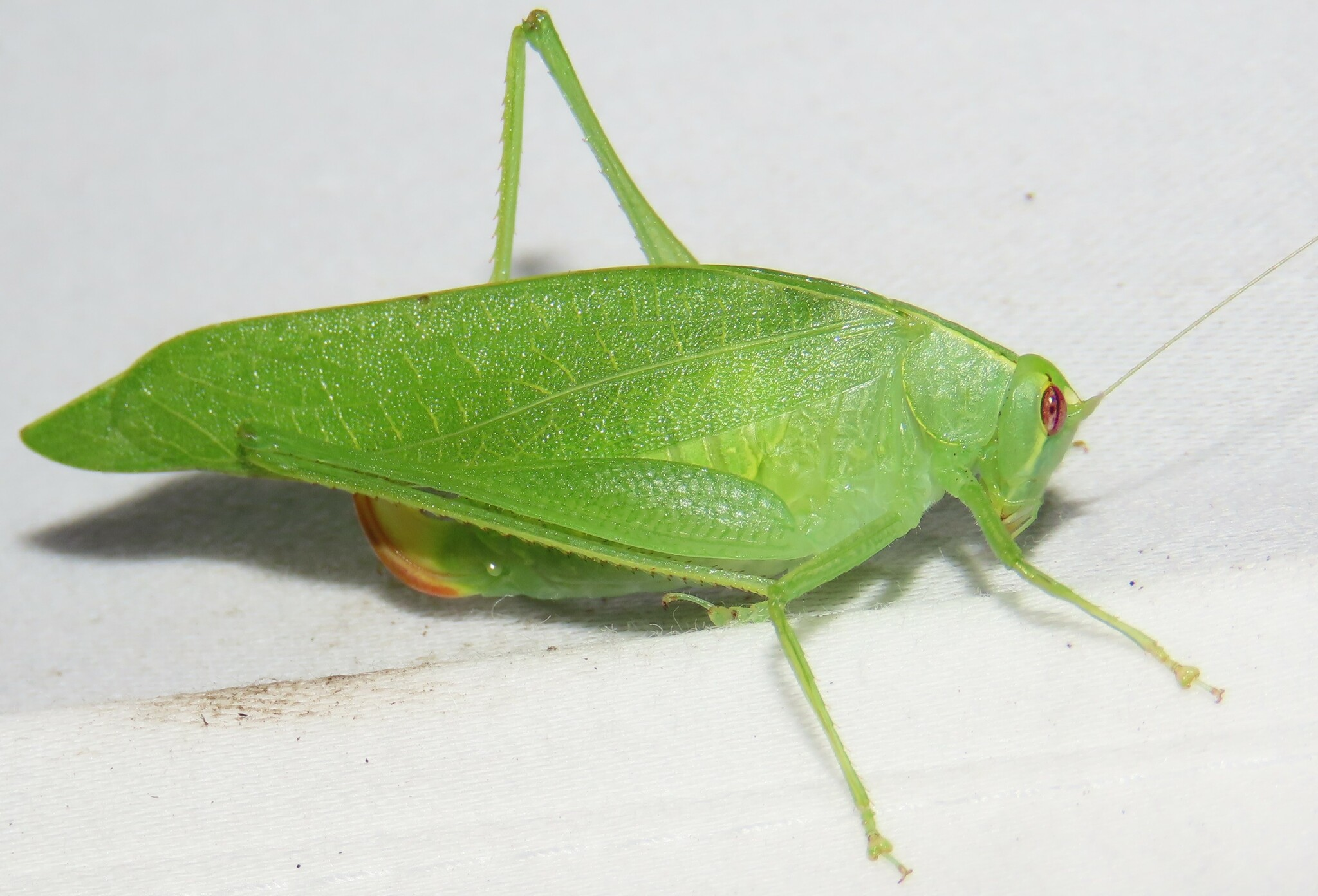
- Montezumina modesta

Scientific classification
- Kingdom: Animalia
- Phylum: Arthropoda
- Class: Insecta
- Order: Orthoptera
- Suborder: Ensifera
- Family: Tettigoniidae
- Subfamily: Phaneropterinae
- Tribe: Pycnopalpini
- Subtribe: Pycnopalpina
- Genus: Montezumina; Hebard, 1925

= Montezumina =

Genus of cricket-like animals

Montezumina is a genus of North, Central, and South American phaneropterine katydids in the family Tettigoniidae. There are at least 30 described species in the genus Montezumina.

== Species ==
These 30 species belong to the genus Montezumina:

- Montezumina azteca Nickle, 1984
- Montezumina bidentata Nickle, 1984
- Montezumina bradleyi Hebard, 1927
- Montezumina bruneri Cadena-Castañeda, 2015
- Montezumina cantralli Nickle, 1984
- Montezumina cohnorum Nickle, 1984
- Montezumina enigmata Nickle, 1984
- Montezumina granti Nickle, 1966
- Montezumina guyana Nickle, 1984
- Montezumina hubbelli Nickle, 1984
- Montezumina inca Nickle, 1984
- Montezumina intermedia Nickle, 1984
- Montezumina lamicerca Nickle, 1984
- Montezumina latipennis (Saussure & Pictet, 1897)
- Montezumina lineata Cadena-Castañeda, 2015
- Montezumina longistyle Márquez Mayaudón, 1965
- Montezumina maculata Nickle, 1984
- Montezumina maya Nickle, 2001
- Montezumina mesembrina Hebard, 1927
- Montezumina modesta (Brunner, 1878) (modest katydid)
- Montezumina oaxaca Nickle, 1984
- Montezumina oblongooculata (Brunner von Wattenwyl, 1878)
- Montezumina obtusangulata Nickle, 1984
- Montezumina oridiopita Nickle, 1984
- Montezumina oridiops (Saussure & Pictet, 1898)
- Montezumina quadripunctata Cadena-Castañeda, 2015
- Montezumina sinaloae Hebard, 1925
- Montezumina unguicerca Nickle, 1984
- Montezumina walkeri Nickle, 1984
- Montezumina zebrata (Bruner, 1915)
