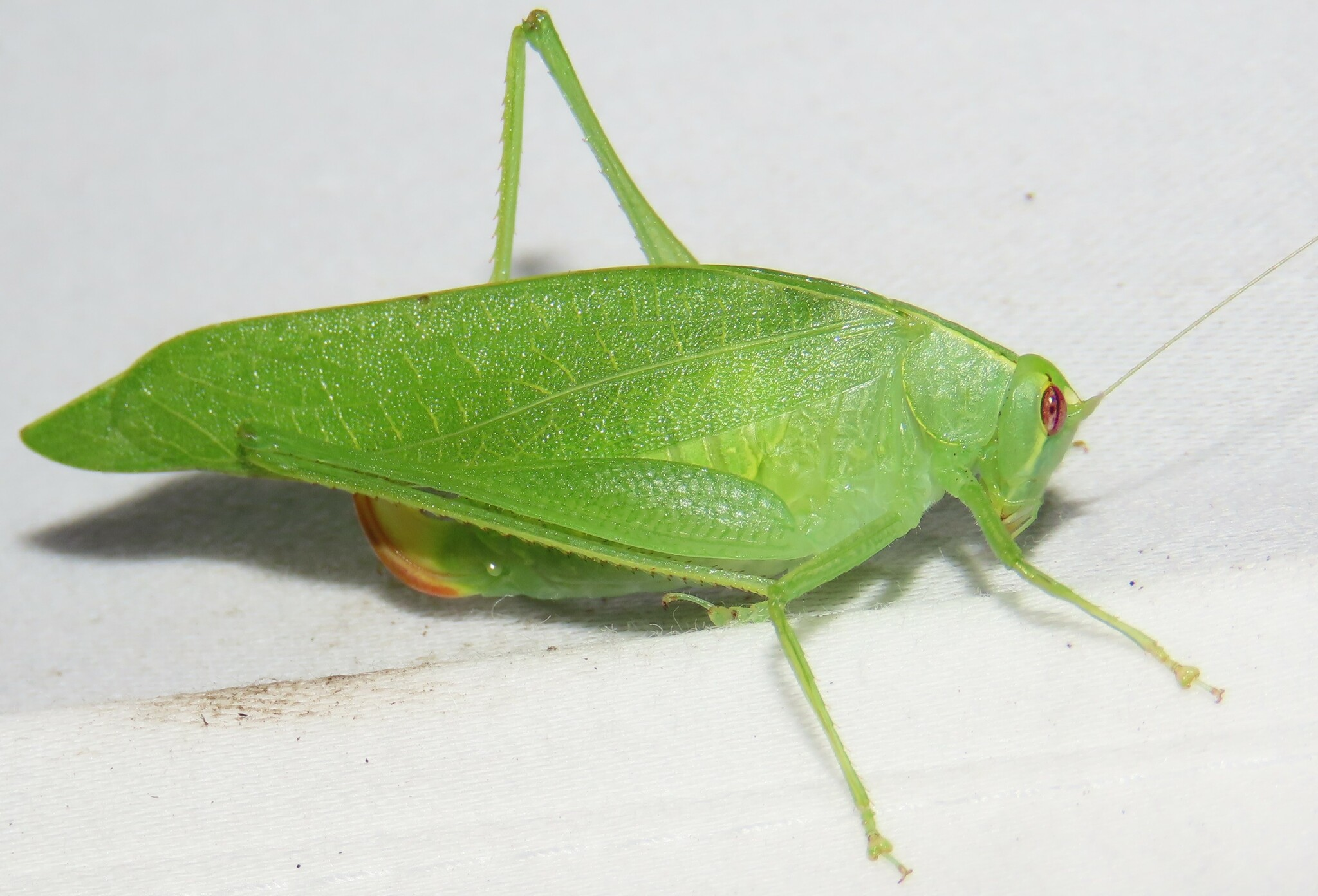

Scientific classification
- Domain: Eukaryota
- Kingdom: Animalia
- Phylum: Arthropoda
- Class: Insecta
- Order: Orthoptera
- Suborder: Ensifera
- Family: Tettigoniidae
- Subfamily: Phaneropterinae
- Tribe: Pycnopalpini
- Subtribe: Pycnopalpina
- Genus: Montezumina
- Species: M. modesta

Binomial name
- Montezumina modesta (Brunner, 1878)

= Montezumina modesta =

Species of cricket-like animal

Montezumina modesta, known generally as modest katydid, is a species of phaneropterine katydid in the family Tettigoniidae. Other common names include the modest bush cricket and Montezuma katydid. It is found in North America.
