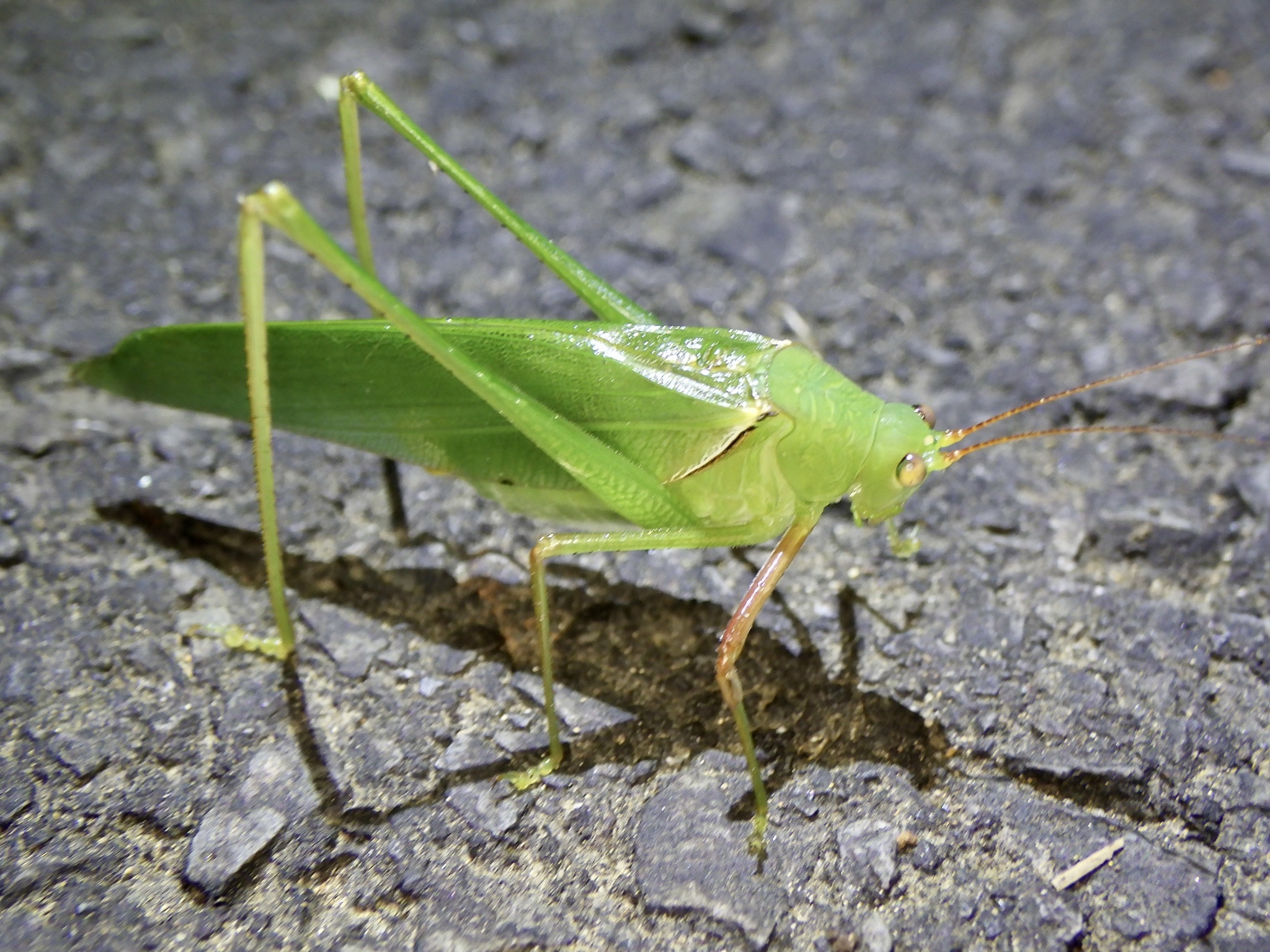
- Sinochlora longifissa

Scientific classification
- Kingdom: Animalia
- Phylum: Arthropoda
- Class: Insecta
- Order: Orthoptera
- Suborder: Ensifera
- Family: Tettigoniidae
- Subfamily: Phaneropterinae
- Tribe: Holochlorini
- Genus: Sinochlora; Tinkham, 1945

= Sinochlora =

Genus of cricket-like animals

Sinochlora is a genus of Asian bush crickets of the tribe Holochlorini within the subfamily Phaneropterinae. Species have been recorded from China, Taiwan, Korea, Japan, and Vietnam.

== Species ==
The Orthoptera Species File lists:

- Sinochlora aequalis Liu & Kang, 2007
- Sinochlora apicalis Wang, Lu & Shi, 2012
- Sinochlora cucullata Wang, Lu & Shi, 2012
- Sinochlora hainanensis Tinkham, 1945
- Sinochlora longifissa (Matsumura & Shiraki, 1908) - type species (as Sinochlora kwangtungensis Tinkham, 1945)
- Sinochlora longipenis Wang, Lu & Shi, 2012
- Sinochlora mesominora Liu & Kang, 2007
- Sinochlora nonspinosa Liu & Kang, 2007
- Sinochlora retrolateralis Liu & Kang, 2007
- Sinochlora semicircula Liu, 2011
- Sinochlora sinensis Tinkham, 1945
- Sinochlora stylosa Shi & Chang, 2004
- Sinochlora szechwanensis Tinkham, 1945
- Sinochlora tibetensis Liu & Kang, 2007
- Sinochlora trapezialis Liu & Kang, 2007
- Sinochlora trispinosa Shi & Chang, 2004
- Sinochlora voluptaria (Carl, 1914)
