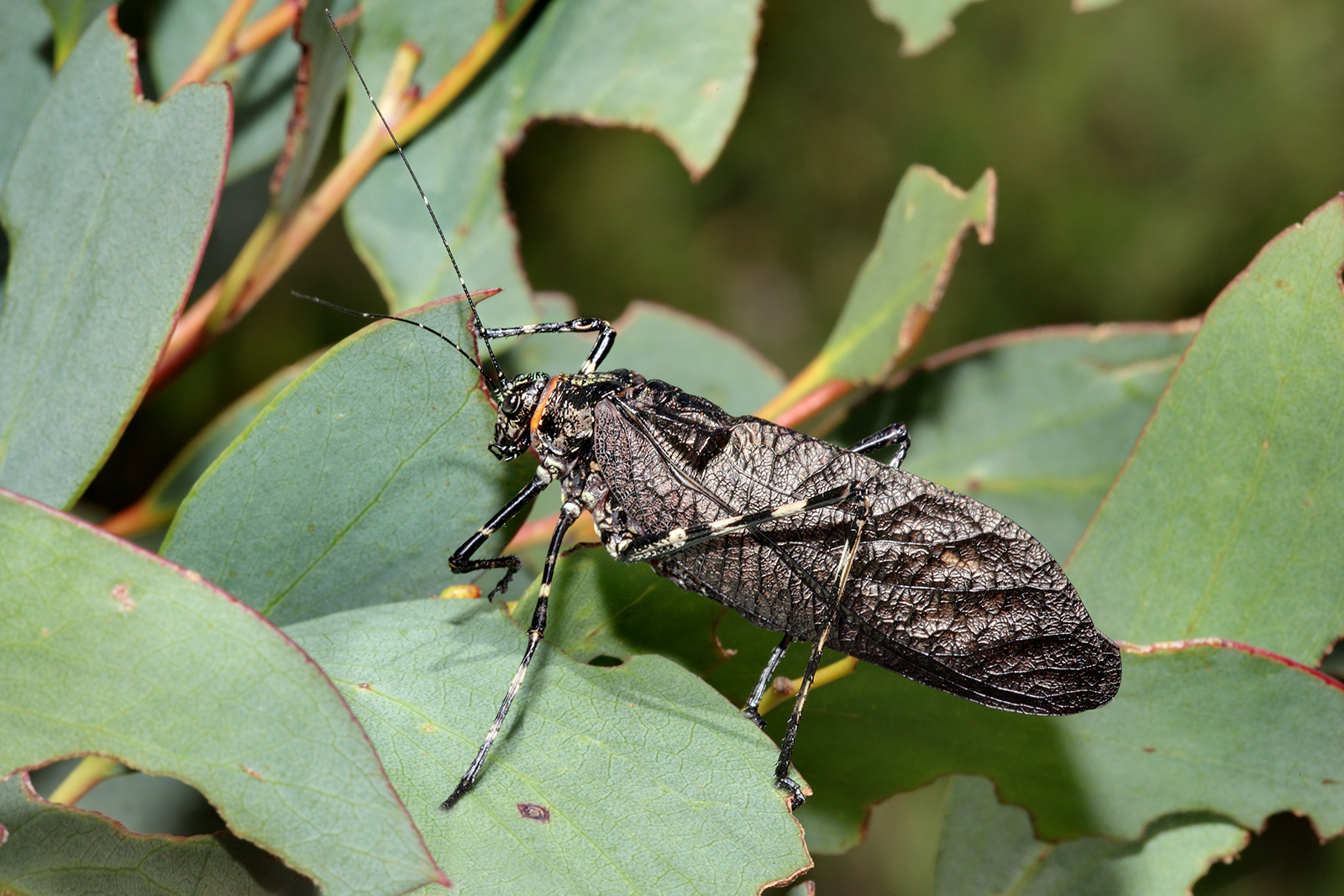
- Male Acripeza reticulata

Scientific classification
- Kingdom: Animalia
- Phylum: Arthropoda
- Clade: Pancrustacea
- Class: Insecta
- Order: Orthoptera
- Suborder: Ensifera
- Family: Tettigoniidae
- Subfamily: Phaneropterinae
- Genus: Acripeza; Guérin-Méneville, 1832
- Species: A. reticulata

Binomial name
- Acripeza reticulata Guérin-Méneville, 1832

Synonyms
- Acridopeza Burmeister, 1838

= Acripeza =

Genus of cricket-like animals

Acripeza is a monotypic genus of katydids containing only the species Acripeza reticulata, commonly known as the mountain katydid. It is found in Australia.
