= Elbenia =

Scientific classification
- Kingdom: Animalia
- Phylum: Arthropoda
- Clade: Pancrustacea
- Class: Insecta
- Order: Orthoptera
- Suborder: Ensifera
- Family: Tettigoniidae
- Subfamily: Phaneropterinae
- Tribe: Holochlorini
- Genus: Elbenia; Stål, 1876

Genus of bush crickets

External image
- Images at iNaturalist

Elbenia is a genus of Asian bush crickets or katydids in the subfamily Phaneropterinae and tribe Holochlorini. It was originally erected by Carl Stål in 1876, but was subject to a major review by Andrey Gorochov in 2023, where species in the former genus Tamdaopteron were placed here as a subgenus together with new descriptions. Records for species occurrence are from Vietnam and Malesia.

== Subgenera and species ==
As of August 2026 the Orthoptera Species File includes six subgenera and lists the following species:

Elbenia (Aequapteron) Gorochov, 2023 (peninsular Malaysia)

1. Elbenia appressa Gorochov, 2023
2. Elbenia bispinosa Karny, 1923

Elbenia (Elbenia) Stål, 1876 (Malesia)

1. Elbenia apicata Gorochov, 2023
2. Elbenia bakeri (Karny, 1921)
3. Elbenia borneensis Karny, 1926
4. Elbenia brevixipha Brunner von Wattenwyl, 1898
5. Elbenia carinata Gorochov, 2023
6. Elbenia digitata Karny, 1926
7. Elbenia eudigitata Gorochov, 2023
8. Elbenia fissa Karny, 1923
9. Elbenia fusca Karny, 1923
10. Elbenia modesta Brunner von Wattenwyl, 1891
11. Elbenia neodigitata Gorochov, 2023
12. Elbenia nigrosignata Stål, 1876 - type species
13. Elbenia paradigitata Gorochov, 2023
14. Elbenia semicarinata Gorochov, 2023
15. Elbenia serraticauda Hebard, 1922
16. Elbenia tenera Brunner von Wattenwyl, 1878

Elbenia (Hemielbenia) Gorochov, 2023 (peninsular Malaysia)

1. Elbenia dyscrita Karny, 1926

Elbenia (Javapteron) Gorochov, 2023 (Java)

1. Elbenia javanica Karny, 1926

Elbenia (Sulapteron) Gorochov, 2025 (S.E. Sulawesi)

1. Elbenia kendariensis Gorochov, 2025

Elbenia (Tamdaopteron) Gorochov, 2005

1. Elbenia appendiculata Brunner von Wattenwyl, 1898
2. Elbenia daedala Gorochov, 2023
3. Elbenia major (Gorochov, 2005)
4. Elbenia minor (Gorochov, 2005)
5. Elbenia pendleburyi Karny, 1926
6. Elbenia robinsoni Karny, 1926
7. Elbenia ryabovi Gorochov, 2023
8. Elbenia smedleyi Karny, 1926
9. Elbenia subrecta Gorochov, 2023
10. Elbenia tembelingi Gorochov, 2025

No subgenus assigned

1. Elbenia fraser Tan, 2014
2. Elbenia jacobsonii Karny, 1926
3. Elbenia loliifolia (Haan, 1843)
4. Elbenia makilingae Hebard, 1922
5. Elbenia manillensis Pictet, 1888
