= Tamdaopteron =

Scientific classification
- Kingdom: Animalia
- Phylum: Arthropoda
- Clade: Pancrustacea
- Class: Insecta
- Order: Orthoptera
- Suborder: Ensifera
- Family: Tettigoniidae
- Subfamily: Phaneropterinae
- Tribe: Holochlorini
- Genus: Elbenia
- Subgenus: Tamdaopteron; Gorochov, 2005

Synonyms
- genus Tamdaopteron Gorochov, 2005

Subgenus of bush crickets

Tamdaopteron is an Asian subgenus of bush crickets in the genus Elbenia (Phaneropterinae tribe Holochlorini). Records for species occurrence are from Vietnam and western Malesia.

== Species ==
As of 2019 the Orthoptera Species File listed:

- Tamdaopteron major Gorochov, 2005 - type species
- Tamdaopteron minor Gorochov, 2005
