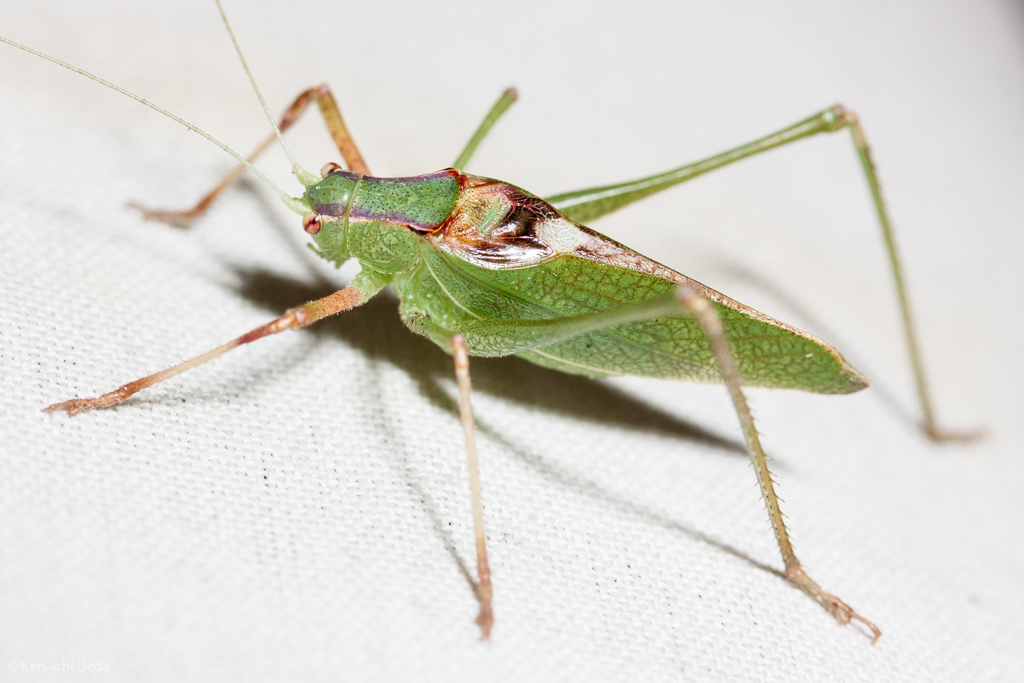

Scientific classification
- Domain: Eukaryota
- Kingdom: Animalia
- Phylum: Arthropoda
- Class: Insecta
- Order: Orthoptera
- Suborder: Ensifera
- Family: Tettigoniidae
- Subfamily: Phaneropterinae
- Genus: Platylyra; Scudder, 1898
- Species: P. californica

Binomial name
- Platylyra californica Scudder, 1898

= Platylyra =

Platylyra californica

Genus of cricket-like animals

Platylyra is a genus of North American katydids or bush crickets in the subfamily Phaneropterinae. It is monotypic, being represented by the single species, Platylyra californica.
