= Inscudderia walkeri =

Scientific classification
- Domain: Eukaryota
- Kingdom: Animalia
- Phylum: Arthropoda
- Class: Insecta
- Order: Orthoptera
- Suborder: Ensifera
- Family: Tettigoniidae
- Subfamily: Phaneropterinae
- Tribe: Scudderiini
- Genus: Inscudderia
- Species: I. walkeri

Binomial name
- Inscudderia walkeri Hebard, 1925

Species of cricket-like animal

Inscudderia walkeri, known generally as the eastern cypress katydid or Walker's katydid, is a species of phaneropterine katydid in the family Tettigoniidae. It is found in North America.
