= Inscudderia =

Scientific classification
- Domain: Eukaryota
- Kingdom: Animalia
- Phylum: Arthropoda
- Class: Insecta
- Order: Orthoptera
- Suborder: Ensifera
- Family: Tettigoniidae
- Subfamily: Phaneropterinae
- Tribe: Scudderiini
- Genus: Inscudderia; Caudell, 1921

Genus of cricket-like animals

Inscudderia is a genus of North American "cypress katydids" in the family Tettigoniidae. There are currently three described species in Inscudderia.

== Species ==
These three species belong to the genus Inscudderia:

- Inscudderia strigata (Scudder, 1898) (guinea-cypress katydid)
- Inscudderia taxodii Caudell, 1921 (western cypress katydid)
- Inscudderia walkeri Hebard, 1925 (eastern cypress katydid)
