= Letana =

Scientific classification
- Kingdom: Animalia
- Phylum: Arthropoda
- Class: Insecta
- Order: Orthoptera
- Suborder: Ensifera
- Superfamily: Tettigonioidea
- Family: Tettigoniidae
- Subfamily: Phaneropterinae
- Tribe: Letanini
- Genus: Letana; Walker, 1869

Synonyms
- Pyrrhicia Stål, 1873; Pyrrhizia Brunner von Wattenwyl, 1891

Genus of cricket-like animals

External image
- Images at iNaturalist

Letana is a genus of bush cricket, characteristic of the tribe Letanini and placed in the subfamily Phaneropterinae. Species can be found in Asia, particularly in India, China and Indochina.

== Species ==
The Orthoptera Species File lists:

1. Letana atomifera (Brunner von Wattenwyl, 1878)
2. Letana bilobata Ingrisch, 1990
3. Letana brachyptera Ingrisch, 1987
4. Letana brevicaudata (Brunner von Wattenwyl, 1893)
5. Letana bulbosa Ingrisch, 1990
6. Letana dentata Nagar & Swaminathan, 2015
7. Letana despecta (Brunner von Wattenwyl, 1878)
8. Letana digitata Ingrisch, 1990
9. Letana emanueli Ingrisch, 1990
10. Letana ganesha Ingrisch & Garai, 2001
11. Letana gracilis Ingrisch, 1990
12. Letana grandis Liu & Xia, 1992
13. Letana hemelytra Liu, 2014
14. Letana inflata (Brunner von Wattenwyl, 1878)
15. Letana infurcata Ingrisch, 1990
16. Letana intermedia Ingrisch, 1990
17. Letana linearis Walker, 1869 - type species
18. Letana magna Ingrisch, 1990
19. Letana megastridula Ingrisch, 1990
20. Letana mursinga Ingrisch & Shishodia, 2000
21. Letana navasi (Bolívar, 1914)
22. Letana nigropoda Ingrisch, 1987
23. Letana nigrosparsa (Walker, 1871)
24. Letana pyrifera Bey-Bienko, 1956
25. Letana recticercis Chopard, 1966
26. Letana rubescens (Stål, 1861)
27. Letana rufonotata (Serville, 1838)
28. Letana serricauda Ingrisch, 1990
29. Letana sinumarginis Liu & Xia, 1992
