= Psyrana =

Scientific classification
- Kingdom: Animalia
- Phylum: Arthropoda
- Clade: Pancrustacea
- Class: Insecta
- Order: Orthoptera
- Suborder: Ensifera
- Family: Tettigoniidae
- Subfamily: Phaneropterinae
- Tribe: Holochlorini
- Genus: Psyrana; Uvarov, 1940

Type species
- Psyra melanonota Stål, 1876

Synonyms
- Psyra Stål, 1876

Genus of cricket-like animals

External image
- Images at iNaturalist

Psyrana is a genus of Asian bush crickets of the tribe Holochlorini within the subfamily Phaneropterinae. They occur in Sri Lanka, China, Korea, Japan, Indochina and Malesia through to New Caledonia.

== Species ==
The Orthoptera Species File includes:

1. Psyrana amaiensis Ichikawa, 2001
2. Psyrana borneensis (Brunner von Wattenwyl, 1878)
3. Psyrana brunneri (Karny, 1920)
4. Psyrana celebica (Karny, 1931)
5. Psyrana ceylonica (Brunner von Wattenwyl, 1891)
6. Psyrana heptagona Liu, 2011
7. Psyrana japonica (Shiraki, 1930)
8. Psyrana longelaminata (Brunner von Wattenwyl, 1891)
9. Psyrana longestylata (Brunner von Wattenwyl, 1891)
10. Psyrana magna Liu, 2011
11. Psyrana melanonota (Stål, 1876)
12. Psyrana peraka (Karny, 1923)
13. Psyrana pomona (Kirby, 1900)
14. Psyrana ponceleti Willemse, 1953
15. Psyrana punctulata (Karny, 1923)
16. Psyrana ryukyuensis Ichikawa, 2001
17. Psyrana solomonensis (Willemse, 1953)
18. Psyrana sondaica (Carl, 1921)
19. Psyrana tigrina (Brunner von Wattenwyl, 1878)
20. Psyrana unicolor (Brunner von Wattenwyl, 1878)
21. Psyrana unimaculata (Willemse, 1933)
22. Psyrana yaeyamaensis Ichikawa, 2001 (3 subspecies)
