= Isopsera =

Scientific classification
- Kingdom: Animalia
- Phylum: Arthropoda
- Class: Insecta
- Order: Orthoptera
- Suborder: Ensifera
- Family: Tettigoniidae
- Subfamily: Phaneropterinae
- Genus: Isopsera; Brunner von Wattenwyl, 1878

Genus of cricket-like animals

External image
- Images at iNaturalist

Isopsera is an Asian genus of bush crickets in the subfamily Phaneropterinae. Species can be found in India, Indochina, Malesia and the Pacific Islands.

== Species ==
The Orthoptera Species File lists:

- Isopsera arcuata Nagar, Mal & Swaminathan, 2015
- Isopsera astyla Karny, 1926
- Isopsera bicuspidota Yang & Kang, 1990
- Isopsera brevissima Shiraki, 1930
- Isopsera caligula Ingrisch, 1990
- Isopsera chaseni Karny, 1926
- Isopsera denticulata Ebner, 1939
- Isopsera fissa Karny, 1931
- Isopsera furcocerca Chen & Liu, 1986
- Isopsera guangxiensis Yang & Kang, 1990
- Isopsera nigroantennata Xia & Liu, 1992
- Isopsera obtusa Brunner von Wattenwyl, 1878
- Isopsera palauensis Vickery & Kevan, 1999
- Isopsera pedunculata Brunner von Wattenwyl, 1878 - type species
- Isopsera punctulata Brunner von Wattenwyl, 1891
- Isopsera rotundata Karny, 1926
- Isopsera scalaris Rehn, 1909
- Isopsera spinosa Ingrisch, 1990
- Isopsera stylata Brunner von Wattenwyl, 1878
- Isopsera sulcata Bey-Bienko, 1955
- Isopsera tonkinensis Carl, 1914
- Isopsera vaga Brunner von Wattenwyl, 1878
- Isopsera yapensis Vickery & Kevan, 1999
