= Hemielimaea =

Scientific classification
- Kingdom: Animalia
- Phylum: Arthropoda
- Class: Insecta
- Order: Orthoptera
- Suborder: Ensifera
- Family: Tettigoniidae
- Subfamily: Phaneropterinae
- Tribe: Elimaeini
- Genus: Hemielimaea; Brunner von Wattenwyl, 1878

Type species
- Hemielimaea chinensis Brunner von Wattenwyl, 1878

Genus of cricket-like animals

External image
- Images at iNaturalist

Hemielimaea is a genus of Asian bush crickets found in Indochina and China (including Taiwan).

== Species ==
As of December 2018, subgenera and species include:

Subgenus Hemielimaea Brunner von Wattenwyl, 1878

- Hemielimaea adeviara Song, Yuan & Liu, 2012
- Hemielimaea caricercata Ingrisch, 2007
- Hemielimaea chinensis Brunner von Wattenwyl, 1878
- Hemielimaea formosana (Shiraki, 1930)
- Hemielimaea kuatun Ingrisch, 2007
- Hemielimaea mannhardti (Krausze, 1903)
- Hemielimaea omeishanica Gorochov, 2007
- Hemielimaea paracari Liu, Wang & Ma, 2013
- Hemielimaea parva Liu, Wang & Ma, 2013
- Hemielimaea proxima Gorochov, 2004
- Hemielimaea reducta Gorochov, 2004
- Hemielimaea vietnamensis Gorochov, 2004

Subgenus Pseudelimaea Gorochov, 2004

- Hemielimaea cucullata Ingrisch, 1990
- Hemielimaea nigerrima (Krausze, 1903)
- Hemielimaea procera Ingrisch, 1990
- Hemielimaea sergeii Gorochov, 2004
- Hemielimaea tonkinensis Dohrn, 1906
