= Deflorita =

Scientific classification
- Domain: Eukaryota
- Kingdom: Animalia
- Phylum: Arthropoda
- Class: Insecta
- Order: Orthoptera
- Suborder: Ensifera
- Family: Tettigoniidae
- Subfamily: Phaneropterinae
- Tribe: Mirolliini
- Genus: Deflorita; Bolívar, 1906

Synonyms
- Exora Brunner von Wattenwyl, 1878

Genus of cricket-like animals

External image
- Images at iNaturalist

Deflorita is a genus of Asian bush crickets of the tribe Mirolliini (subfamily Phaneropterinae).

Records for species distributions include: Sri Lanka, China, Taiwan, Indo-China and western Malesia (including Borneo).

== Species ==
The Orthoptera Species File list:

- Deflorita apicalis Shiraki, 1930
- Deflorita argentata Ingrisch, 1998
- Deflorita bella Gorochov, 2008
- Deflorita centa Shi & Chang, 2004
- Deflorita curva Shi & Chang, 2004
- Deflorita decora Gorochov, 2008
- Deflorita deflorita Brunner von Wattenwyl, 1878 - type species (as Exora deflorita)
- Deflorita forceps Gorochov, 2004
- Deflorita hemilyra Gorochov, 2004
- Deflorita integra Ingrisch, 1998
- Deflorita lyra Gorochov, 2004
- Deflorita marginata Ingrisch, 2011
- Deflorita parallela Gorochov, 2004
- Deflorita paralyra Gorochov, 2008
- Deflorita protecta Ingrisch, 2011
- Deflorita pulchra Gorochov, 2008
- Deflorita unicolor Karny, 1926
