= Scambophyllum =

Scientific classification
- Domain: Eukaryota
- Kingdom: Animalia
- Phylum: Arthropoda
- Class: Insecta
- Order: Orthoptera
- Suborder: Ensifera
- Family: Tettigoniidae
- Subfamily: Phaneropterinae
- Genus: Scambophyllum; Brunner von Wattenwyl, 1878

Genus of cricket-like animals

External image
- Images at iNaturalist

Scambophyllum is a genus of bush crickets in the subfamily Phaneropterinae. Species can be found mostly in Indochina and Malesia.

== Species ==
The Orthoptera Species File lists:

1. Scambophyllum albomarginatum Hebard, 1922
2. Scambophyllum angustipenne Karny, 1926
3. Scambophyllum basileus Karny, 1926
4. Scambophyllum pendleburyi Karny, 1926
5. Scambophyllum rarofasciatum Karny, 1926
6. Scambophyllum sandakanae Hebard, 1922
7. Scambophyllum sanguinolentum Westwood, 1848 - type species (as Phylloptera sanguinolenta Westwood)

== External Links & Illustrations ==
- Flickr: S. angustipenne, ID by Piotr Nasckreki, Danum Valley, Borneo.
- Roskov Y.; Kunze T.; Orrell T.; Abucay L.; Paglinawan L.; Culham A.; Bailly N.; Kirk P.; Bourgoin T.; Baillargeon G.; Decock W.; De Wever A. (2011). Didžiulis V. (ed.). "Species 2000 & ITIS Catalogue of Life: 2011 Annual Checklist". Species 2000: Reading, UK.
