= Prohimerta =

Scientific classification
- Domain: Eukaryota
- Kingdom: Animalia
- Phylum: Arthropoda
- Class: Insecta
- Order: Orthoptera
- Suborder: Ensifera
- Family: Tettigoniidae
- Subfamily: Phaneropterinae
- Tribe: Ducetiini
- Genus: Prohimerta; Hebard, 1922

Type species
- Prohimerta annamensis Hebard, 1922

Genus of cricket-like animals

External image
- Image at iNaturalist

Prohimerta is an Asian genus of bush crickets found in Indochina (mostly Vietnam) and China.

== Species ==
As of 2022, subgenera and species include:

Prohimerta (Anisotima) Bey-Bienko, 1951

1. Prohimerta choui (Kang & Yang, 1989)
2. Prohimerta dispar (Bey-Bienko, 1951)
3. Prohimerta fujianensis Gorochov & Kang, 2002
4. Prohimerta guizhouensis Gorochov & Kang, 2002
5. Prohimerta hubeiensis Gorochov & Kang, 2002
6. Prohimerta laocai Gorochov, 2010
7. Prohimerta sichuanensis Gorochov & Kang, 2002
8. Prohimerta vieta Gorochov, 2003
9. Prohimerta yunnanea (Bey-Bienko, 1962)

Prohimerta (Prohimerta) Hebard, 1922

1. Prohimerta annamensis Hebard, 1922 - type species (locality: Phuc Son, central Vietnam)
2. Prohimerta maculosa (Krausze, 1903)
