= Brachyinsara hemiptera =

Scientific classification
- Domain: Eukaryota
- Kingdom: Animalia
- Phylum: Arthropoda
- Class: Insecta
- Order: Orthoptera
- Suborder: Ensifera
- Family: Tettigoniidae
- Subfamily: Phaneropterinae
- Tribe: Insarini
- Genus: Brachyinsara
- Species: B. hemiptera

Binomial name
- Brachyinsara hemiptera Hebard, 1939

Species of true bug

Brachyinsara hemiptera, the least katydid, is a species of phaneropterine katydid in the family Tettigoniidae. It is found in North America.
