= Brachyinsara =

Scientific classification
- Domain: Eukaryota
- Kingdom: Animalia
- Phylum: Arthropoda
- Class: Insecta
- Order: Orthoptera
- Suborder: Ensifera
- Family: Tettigoniidae
- Subfamily: Phaneropterinae
- Tribe: Insarini
- Genus: Brachyinsara; Rehn & Hebard, 1914

Genus of cricket-like animals

Brachyinsara is a genus of phaneropterine katydids in the family Tettigoniidae. There are at least two described species in Brachyinsara.

== Species ==
These two species belong to the genus Brachyinsara:

- Brachyinsara hemiptera Hebard, 1939 (least katydid)
- Brachyinsara magdalenae Rehn & Hebard, 1914
