= Himertula =

Scientific classification
- Domain: Eukaryota
- Kingdom: Animalia
- Phylum: Arthropoda
- Class: Insecta
- Order: Orthoptera
- Suborder: Ensifera
- Superfamily: Tettigonioidea
- Family: Tettigoniidae
- Subfamily: Phaneropterinae
- Tribe: Letanini
- Genus: Himertula; Uvarov, 1940

Genus of cricket-like animals

Himertula is a genus of bush crickets in the subfamily Phaneropterinae and tribe Letanini. Species can be found mostly in the Indian sub-continent.

== Species ==
The Orthoptera Species File lists:

1. Himertula kinneari Uvarov, 1923
2. Himertula marginata (Brunner von Wattenwyl, 1878) - type species (as Himerta marginata Brunner von Wattenwyl - multiple specimens, including from "Himalaya")
3. Himertula marmorata Brunner von Wattenwyl, 1891
4. Himertula odonturaeformis Brunner von Wattenwyl, 1891
5. Himertula pallida Brunner von Wattenwyl, 1891
6. Himertula pallisignata Ingrisch & Shishodia, 1998
7. Himertula vidhyavathiae Ingrisch & Muralirangan, 2004
8. Himertula viridis Uvarov, 1927
