= Hueikaeana =

Scientific classification
- Domain: Eukaryota
- Kingdom: Animalia
- Phylum: Arthropoda
- Class: Insecta
- Order: Orthoptera
- Suborder: Ensifera
- Family: Tettigoniidae
- Subfamily: Phaneropterinae
- Tribe: Mirolliini
- Genus: Hueikaeana; Ingrisch, 1998

Genus of cricket-like animals

Hueikaeana is a genus of Asian bush crickets of the tribe Mirolliini within the subfamily Phaneropterinae.

== Species ==
The Orthoptera Species File lists the following species found in southern China, Indo-China and Malesia:

- Hueikaeana albopunctata Wang & Shi, 2010
- Hueikaeana alia Gorochov, 2004
- Hueikaeana andreji Ingrisch, 2011
- Hueikaeana directa Ingrisch, 1998 - type species
- Hueikaeana dohrni (Brunner von Wattenwyl, 1891)
- Hueikaeana ornata Gorochov, 2008
- Hueikaeana pulchella Gorochov, 2004
- Hueikaeana quadrimaculata Ingrisch, 2011
