= Paraducetia =

Scientific classification
- Domain: Eukaryota
- Kingdom: Animalia
- Phylum: Arthropoda
- Class: Insecta
- Order: Orthoptera
- Suborder: Ensifera
- Family: Tettigoniidae
- Subfamily: Phaneropterinae
- Tribe: Ducetiini
- Genus: Paraducetia; Gorochov & Kang, 2002

Genus of cricket-like animals

External image
- Images at iNaturalist

Paraducetia is a genus of Asian bush crickets that belong to the subfamily Phaneropterinae and the tribe Ducetiini. The two known species have been recorded from southern China and Indo-China.

== Species ==
Species and subspecies include:

1. Paraducetia cruciata (Brunner von Wattenwyl, 1891) - Indo-China
  1. Paraducetia cruciata cruciata (Brunner von Wattenwyl, 1891) - Cambodia
  2. Paraducetia cruciata gialai Gorochov, 2010 - Vietnam
2. Paraducetia paracruciata Gorochov & Kang, 2002 - southern China - type species
