= Zulpha =

Scientific classification
- Kingdom: Animalia
- Phylum: Arthropoda
- Clade: Pancrustacea
- Class: Insecta
- Order: Orthoptera
- Suborder: Ensifera
- Family: Tettigoniidae
- Subfamily: Phaneropterinae
- Genus: Zulpha (Westwood, 1848)

Synonyms
- of type: Eurypalpa perlaria (Westwood, 1848); Phaneroptera perlaria Westwood, 1848

Genus of cricket-like animals

Zulpha is a genus of bush crickets belongs to the new tribe Eurypalpini within the subfamily Phaneropterinae.

== Species ==
As of August 2026, the following Zulpha species have been recorded from: SE China, the Andaman IslandsVietnam, northern Borneo and NE Australia.

1. Zulpha fenghuang Wu & Liu, 2020
2. Zulpha perlaria (Westwood, 1848) - type species
3. Zulpha ruohua Wu, Zhang & Liu, 2020
