= Cohnia =

Scientific classification
- Kingdom: Animalia
- Phylum: Arthropoda
- Clade: Pancrustacea
- Class: Insecta
- Order: Orthoptera
- Suborder: Ensifera
- Family: Tettigoniidae
- Subfamily: Phaneropterinae
- Tribe: Odonturini
- Genus: Cohnia; Buzzetti, Fontana & Carotti, 2010

Genus of bush crickets

Cohnia is a genus of Neotropical, sickle-bearing bush crickets now placed in the tribe Anisophyini (previously the Odonturini); it was described by Buzzetti, Fontana & Carotti in 2010.

== Species ==
The Orthoptera Species File lists:

1. Cohnia andeana Hebard, 1924 - type species (as Dichopetala andeana Hebard)
2. Cohnia equatorialis Giglio-Tos, 1898
3. Cohnia inca Rehn, 1955
4. Cohnia transfuga (Brunner von Wattenwyl, 1878)
