= Acropsis =

Scientific classification
- Domain: Eukaryota
- Kingdom: Animalia
- Phylum: Arthropoda
- Class: Insecta
- Order: Orthoptera
- Suborder: Ensifera
- Family: Tettigoniidae
- Subfamily: Phaneropterinae
- Tribe: Microcentrini
- Genus: Acropsis; Uvarov, 1939

Genus of insects

Acropsis is a genus of phaneropterid bushcrickets belonging to the family Tettigoniidae.

The species of this genus are found in Southern America.

Species:

- Acropsis julianae Mendes & Rafael, 2020
- Acropsis solimoesensis Mendes & Rafael, 2020
- Acropsis tectiformis (Brunner von Wattenwyl, 1878)
