= Fritz Hoffmann-La Roche =

Swiss businessman

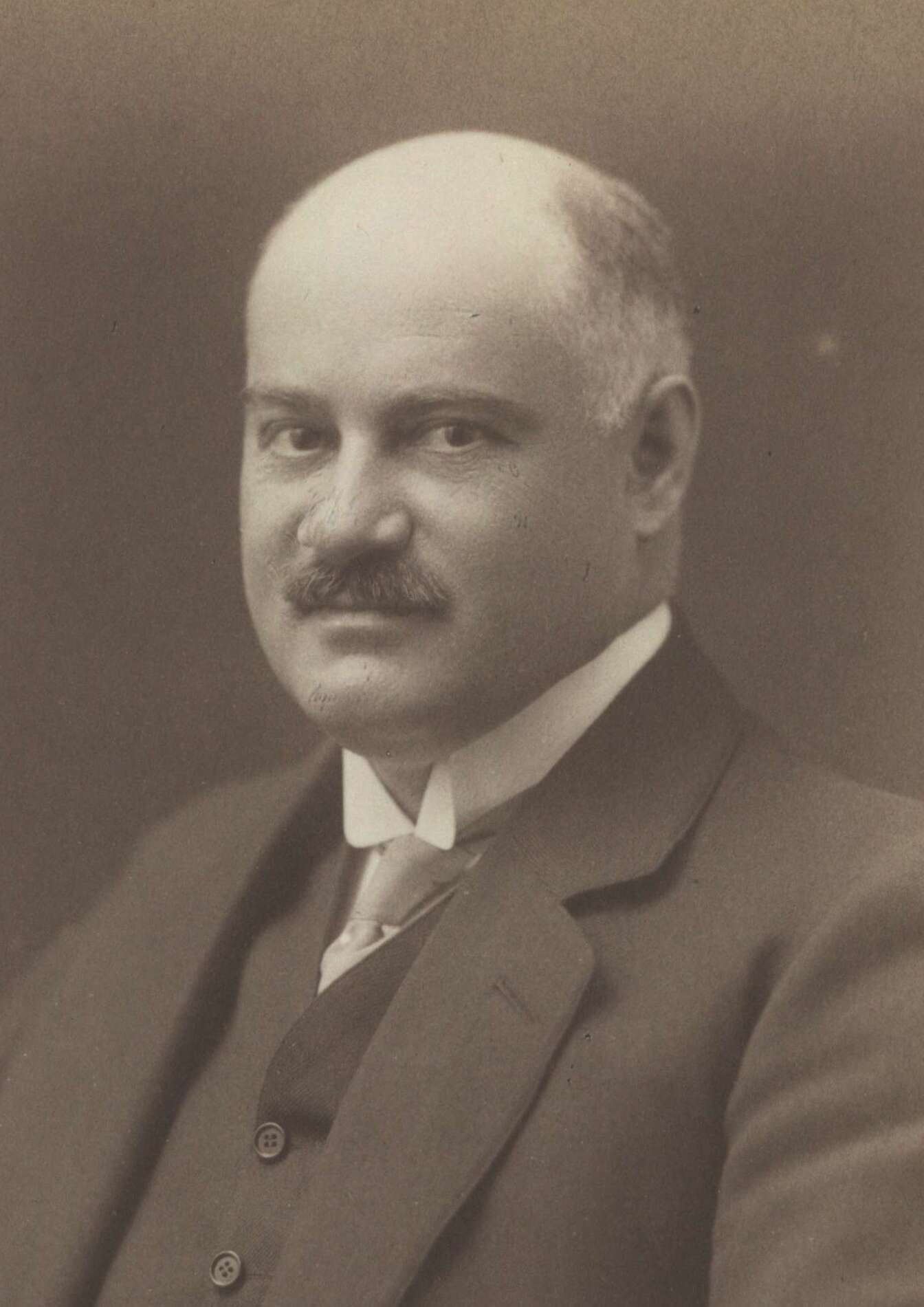
- Born: Friedrich Hoffmann; 24 October 1868; Basel, Switzerland
- Died: 18 April 1920 (aged 51); Basel, Switzerland
- Other name: Fritz Hoffmann-von der Mühll
- Occupation: Businessman
- Spouses: Adèle La Roche; Elisabeth von der Mühll
- Children: Emanuel Hoffmann; Alfred Hoffmann
- Relatives: Luc Hoffmann (grandson; son of Emmanuel)

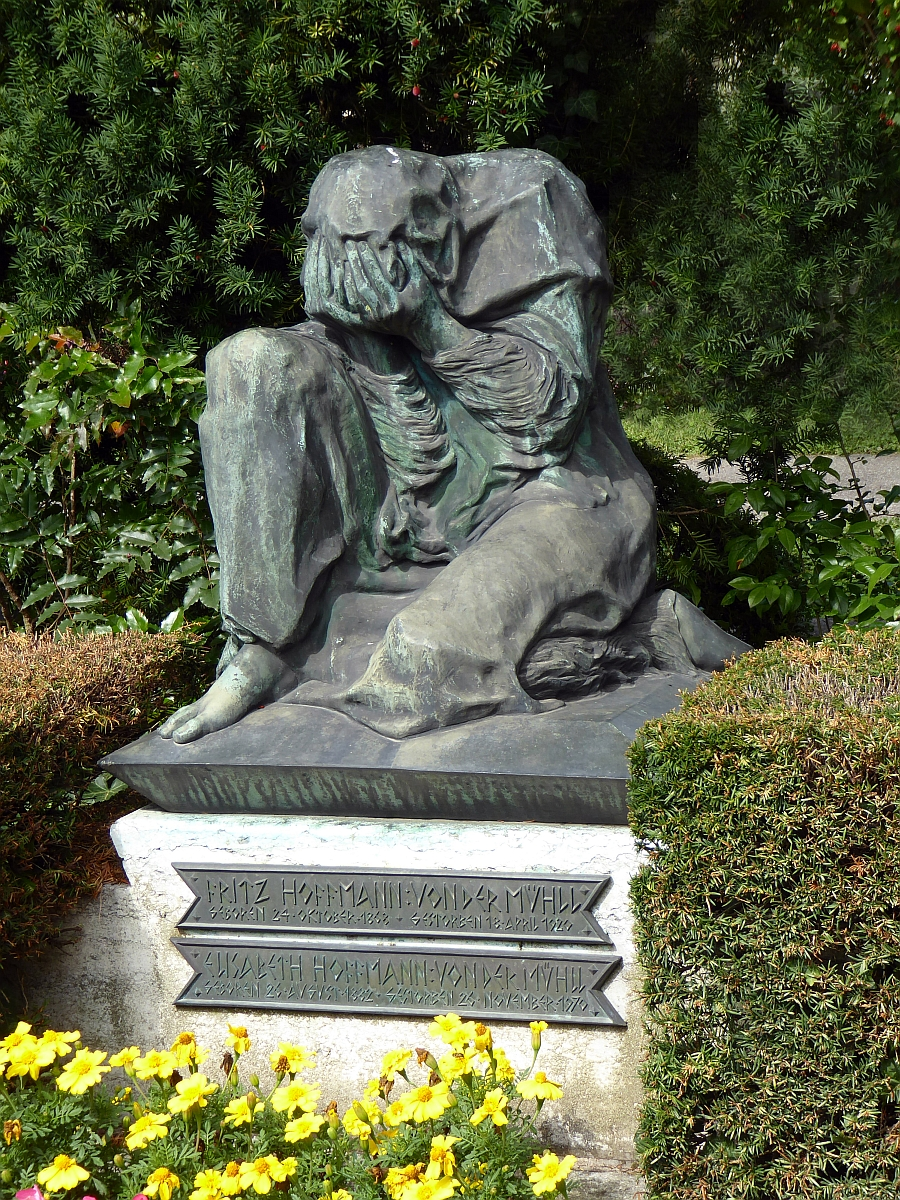
Fritz Hoffmann-La Roche (von der Mühll) (1868–1920), Wolfgottesacker, Basel

Friedrich "Fritz" Hoffmann-La Roche respectively Hoffmann-von der Mühll (24 October 1868 – 18 April 1920) was a Swiss industrialist and businessman who founded the pharmaceutical concern F. Hoffmann-La Roche & Co (presently known as Roche) in 1896.

== Early life and education ==
Hoffmann was born 24 October 1868 in Basel, Switzerland, the third of five children, to Friedrich Hoffmann (1838–1897), silk ribbon manufacturer, and Anna Elisabeth Hoffmann (née Merian; 1845–1913), into a Protestant family belonging to the Daig. His siblings were; Alfred Leonhard Hoffmann (1864–1867), Maria Elisabeth Koechlin (née Hoffmann; 1866–1931), Karl Rudolf Hoffmann (1872–1944) and Ernst Walter Hoffmann (1880–1905).

His godparents were his maternal grandfather, Johann Heinrich Merian (1818–1874), an affluent merchant who also owned Teufen Castle in Freienstein-Teufen, and his uncle, Carl Felix Burckhardt, who served as Mayor of Basel, and Anna von der Mühll. His paternal and maternal families belonged to the Daig.

Hoffmann completed compulsory schooling Basel. In 1886, he completed an apprenticeship at a bank in Yverdon-les-Bains, in Romandy. He ultimately returned to his home town, where he became a trainee at Bohny, Hollinger & Co, a pharmacy in Basel. Between 1891 and 1892 he worked in London, and between 1892 and 1893 in Hamburg to further his experience in chemistry-related business.

== Professional career ==
After being quarantined during the 1892 cholera epidemic in Hamburg, Hoffmann returned to Basel, where he entered his former employer Bohny, Hollinger & Co intending to become a full partner. There he headed the department that manufactured floor wax and essential oils. After a dispute with the owners and to avoid to be dismissed from the firm, he received a loan of 90,000 Swiss Francs (approximately 1–1.2 million Swiss Francs in modern equivalency) of his father, to acquire the laboratory.

In 1894, he formed a company with Max Carl Traub (1855–1919) called Hoffmann, Traub & Co., which manufactured a limited range of pharmaceutical and chemical products. His father contributed the majority of the capital, and Traub some patents and contracts. In 1896, Traub left the company and it was renamed F. Hoffmann-La Roche & Co. In the same year, Hoffmann employed the well regarded chemist Emil Christoph Barell, who was a noted personality in the company until the 1950s. He was responsible for the development of Sirolin, cough medication, that despite its ineffectiveness made the company commercially very successful.

Hoffmann became independently wealthy and opened several branches of the firm in Germany (1897), Paris (1903), New York (1905), Vienna (1907), London (1908), St. Petersburg (1910) and Yokohoma (1912). In 1918, the company was consolidated into a stock corporation.

== Personal life ==
In 1895, Hoffmann married Adèle La Roche (1876–1938), daughter of Emanuel Alfred La Roche (1840–1923), a raw silk merchant, and Adelheid "Adele" La Roche (née Passavant; 1847–1927), who both also hailed from the Daig. Her mother was the older sister of Carl Passavant. They had two sons;

- Emanuel Fritz Hoffmann (1896–1932), married Marie Anne Stehlin (1896–1989), with whom he had two sons and a daughter. His son, Luc Hoffmann, married Daria Razumovsky (1925-2002). She was the second child of Count Andreas Razumovsky and Princess Katharina Nikolajevna Sayn-Wittgenstein, who fled Russia in 1918 after the October Revolution. Together they had four children: Vera, Maja, André, and Daschenka.
- Alfred Hoffmann (1898–1987), married firstly Alice Cecilia Trobeck (1897–1976), secondly Thérèse Boillat (1895–1943) and thirdly Marianne Lindemann (1908–2007).

As it was a common practice in Switzerland for married couples to hyphenate the name to incorporate both surnames, so from this point he was often referred to as Fritz Hoffmann-La Roche. They were divorced in 1919. In the same year, Hoffmann secondly married to Elisabeth von der Mühll (1881–1970).

Hoffmann died on 18 April 1920 aged 51.
