= Von der Mühll =

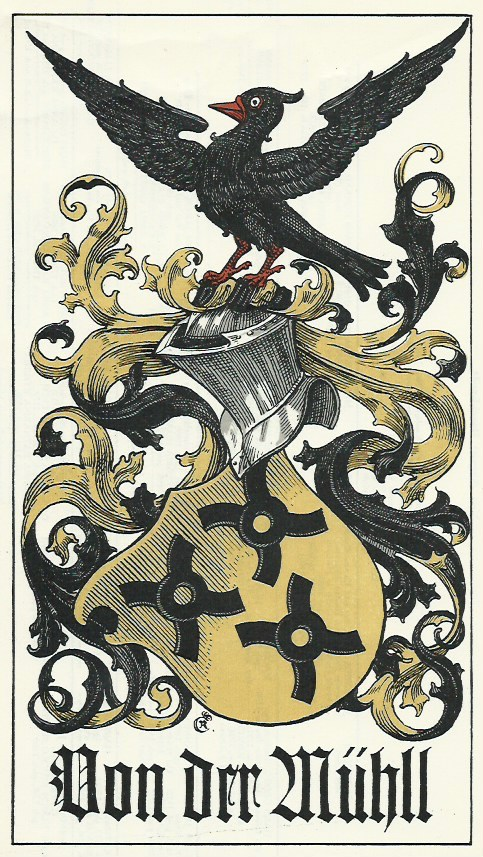
The coat of arms of the Von der Mühll family, in the Wappenbuch der Stadt Basel.

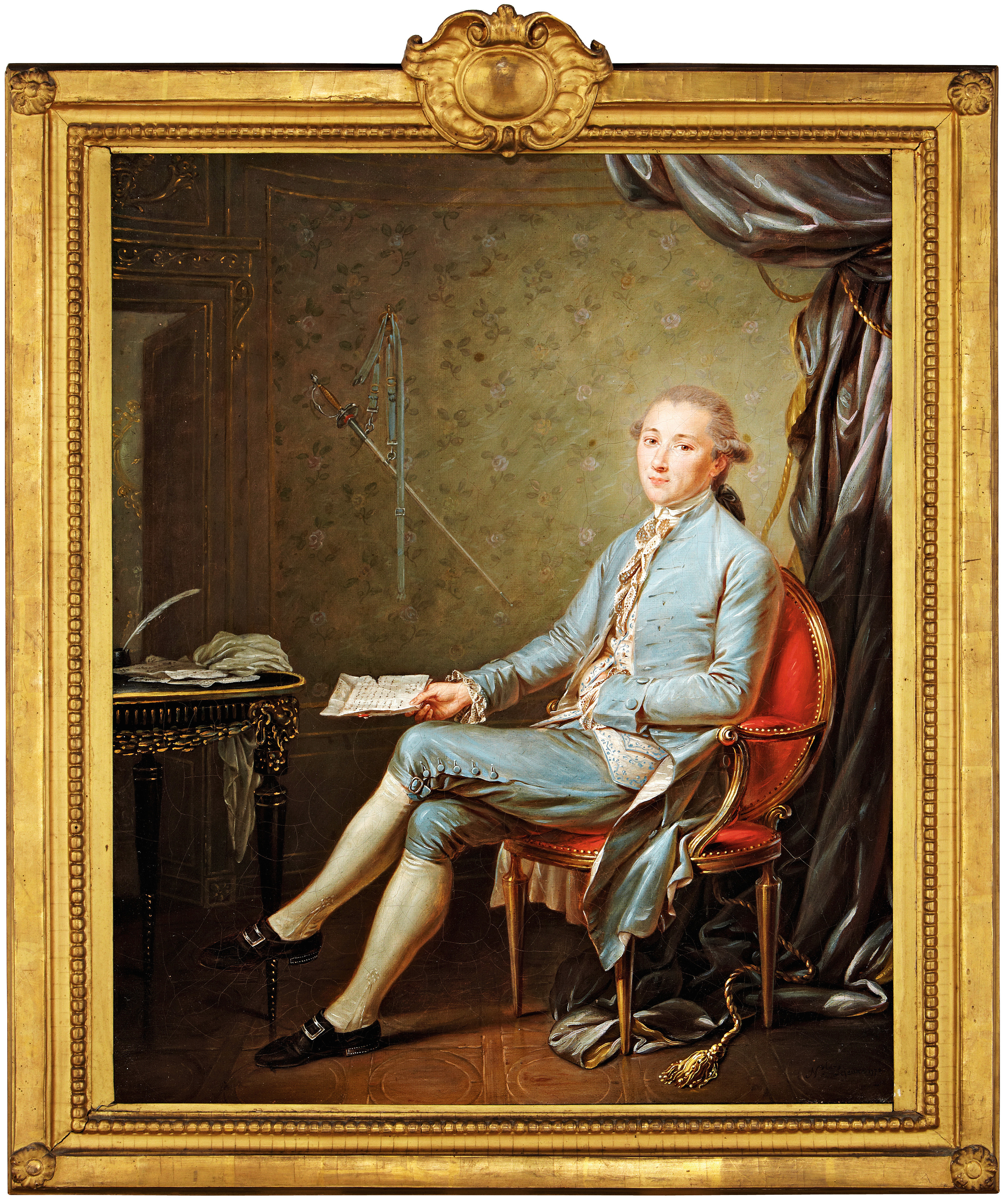
Johannes Von der Mühll-Faesch (1754-1815) by Nicholas LeJeune, Basel, 1778.

Von der Mühll or Von der Mühl is a Swiss patrician (see the Daig of Basel) and noble family.

From the 18th century, with other patrician families in Basel (Merian, Burckhardt, Faesch, Vischer), the Von der Mühll family dominated the city of Basel's political, economic and social landscape.

The coat of arms of the Von der Mühll family is a shield in or (gold), set with three fers-de-moline sable (three black mill-rinds). The crest is an eagle sable (black eagle) in flight, its beak and talons in gold.

== History ==
The family probably originated from Moulins, France, in the 12th century. In the 15th century a branch emigrated to Delft, from where Johannes fled in the 16th century for confessional reasons. A religious refugee in Herborn (Hessen), he is mentioned there as a linen merchant and mayor in 1561.

His son, Christoffel (Stoffel), was a banker and linen merchant in Herborn. Christoffel's son, Johannes, was the Hofmeister and chamberlain of the princes of the House of Orange-Nassau in Dillenburg. The family coat of arms still appears today on the frontispiece of the town hall in Herborn, and was restored in 2016.

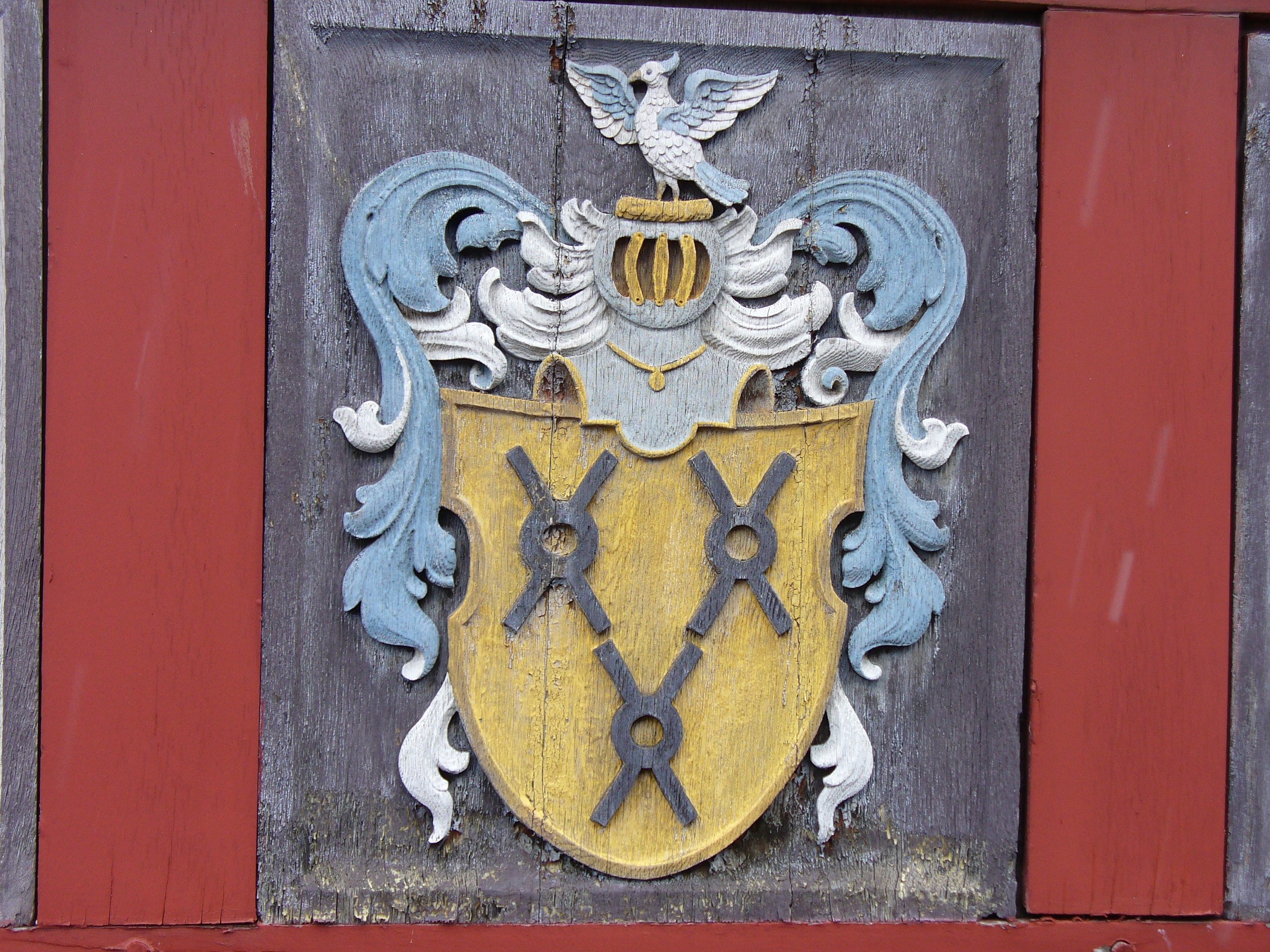
The coat of arms of the family Von der Mühll on the façade of the town hall of Herborn in Hessen, Germany.

Johannes' great-grandsons, Hans Georg (1648-1727) and Johann Valentin (1656-1732), came to Basel, Switzerland, in 1674 to work as saddlers and shoemakers, eventually becoming masters of their trade. The still existing Basel branch descends from Hans Georg, who became burgher of Basel in 1680. He was admitted to the Zunft zum Himmel, and sat on the Grand Council of Basel from 1703 until his death in 1727.

His son, Johannes Von der Mühll-Burckhardt (1695-1774), was elected law lord (Gerichtsherr) and turned to the silk trade, the family company later becoming Von der Mühll & Söhne, then Von der Mühll & Cie. In 1899, Von der Mühll & Cie merged with Kern Sohn & Cie. and F. U. Bally Söhne to form the Gesellschaft für Bandfabrikation. The new stock joint company produced ribbons, sewing threads and traded in silk until 1930, when it finally closed.

Hans Georg Von der Mühll-Gemuseus (1725-1783), son of Johannes, was master of the Zunft des Hausgenossen from 1777 until his death in 1784 and was the first representative of the family to sit on the Small Council of Basel.

Johannes Von der Mühll-Faesch (1754-1815), son of Hans Georg, was elected president of the city of Basel under the Swiss Confederation in 1805, a position he served until his death in 1815, and master of the Zunft zum Weinleuten from 1808 to 1814.

Johann Georg Von der Mühll-Burckhardt (1789-1853), nephew of Johannes, was in 1814 one of the founders of the trading, shipping and banking company Burckhardt & Von der Mühll. From 1816 to 1847, he was a member of the Grand Council of Basel, where he specifically campaigned for the introduction of progressive income tax on revenue. This so-called "Basel system", introduced in Basel in 1840, quickly became a model for other cantons. A self taught architect, he designed the Basel Sommercasino, built in 1824.

From the 17th century onwards, the Von der Mühll family intermarried with the other leading families of the Basel patriciate (Burckhardt, Faesch, Hoffmann, Merian, Sarasin, Staehelin, Vischer).

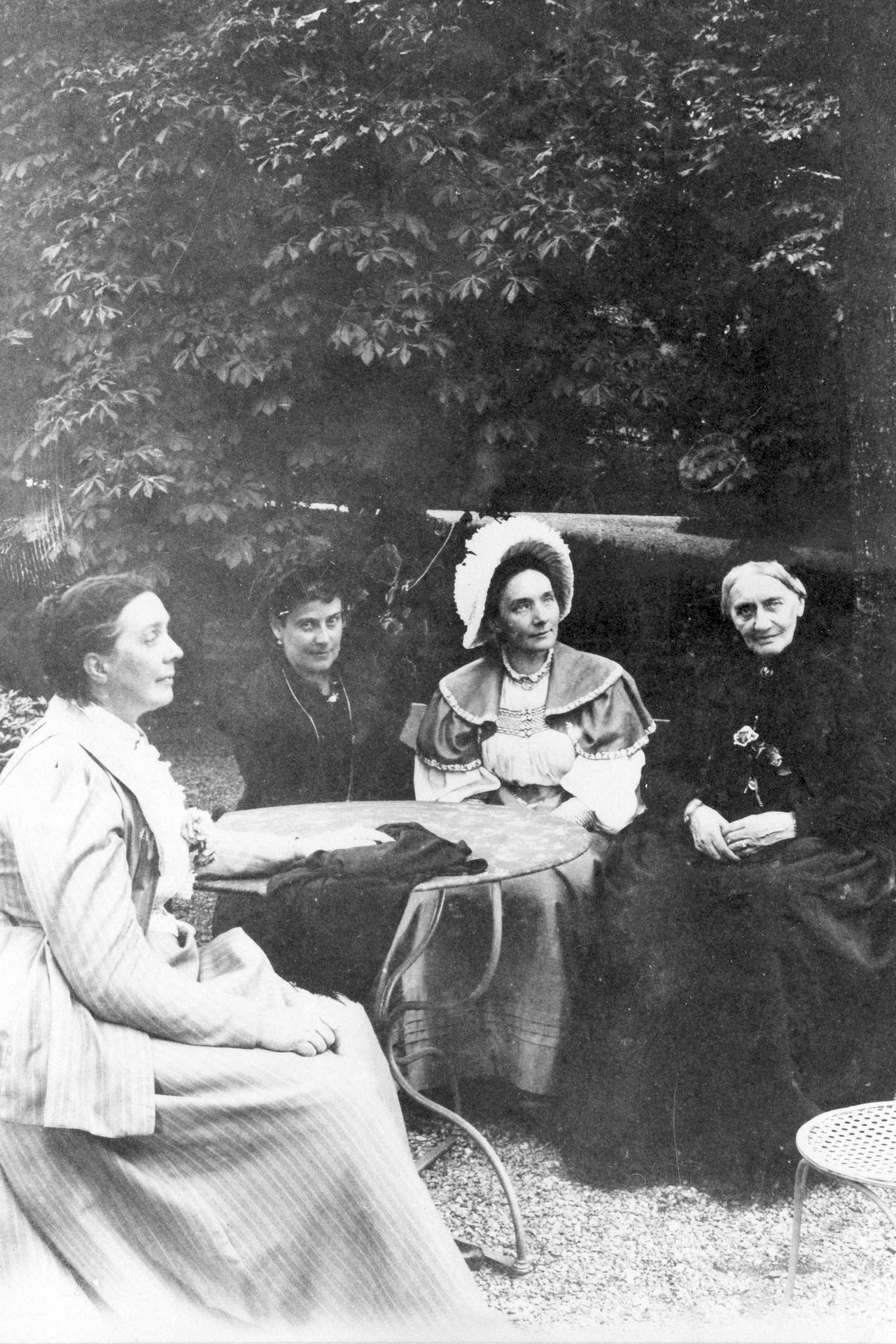
A photograph of (from left to right) Marie Schumann, Marie-Louise (Loucky) Von der Mühll-Burckhardt, Eugenie Schumann and Clara Schumann in Basel, Switzerland (c.1895).

In the 19th century, the family became patrons to various causes, and in particular hosted Clara Schumann on several of her visits to Switzerland and later the poet Rainer Maria Rilke, who dedicated a poem to Theodora Von der Mühll-Burckhardt, sister of Carl Jacob Burckhardt.

Elisabeth Von der Mühll-Staehelin (1882–1970) married Fritz Hoffmann-La Roche in 1919, the founder of Hoffmann-La Roche.

== Notable Members ==
Notable members of this family include:

- Adolf Wagner von der Mühl
- Friedrich von der Mühll (1883–1942), Swiss philologist and professor
- Hans von der Mühll-Burckhardt (1887–1953), Swiss architect, partner at Von der Mühll und Oberrauch
- Henri-Robert von der Mühll (1898–1980), Swiss architect
- Karl von der Mühll-His (1841–1912), Swiss physicist and mathematician, rector of the University of Basel
- Paul von der Mühll-Passavant (1863–1924), Swiss colonel and doctor
- Peter von der Mühll (1885–1970), Swiss classical philologist and university lecturer
