= Luc Hoffmann =

Swiss ornithologist, conservationist and philanthropist

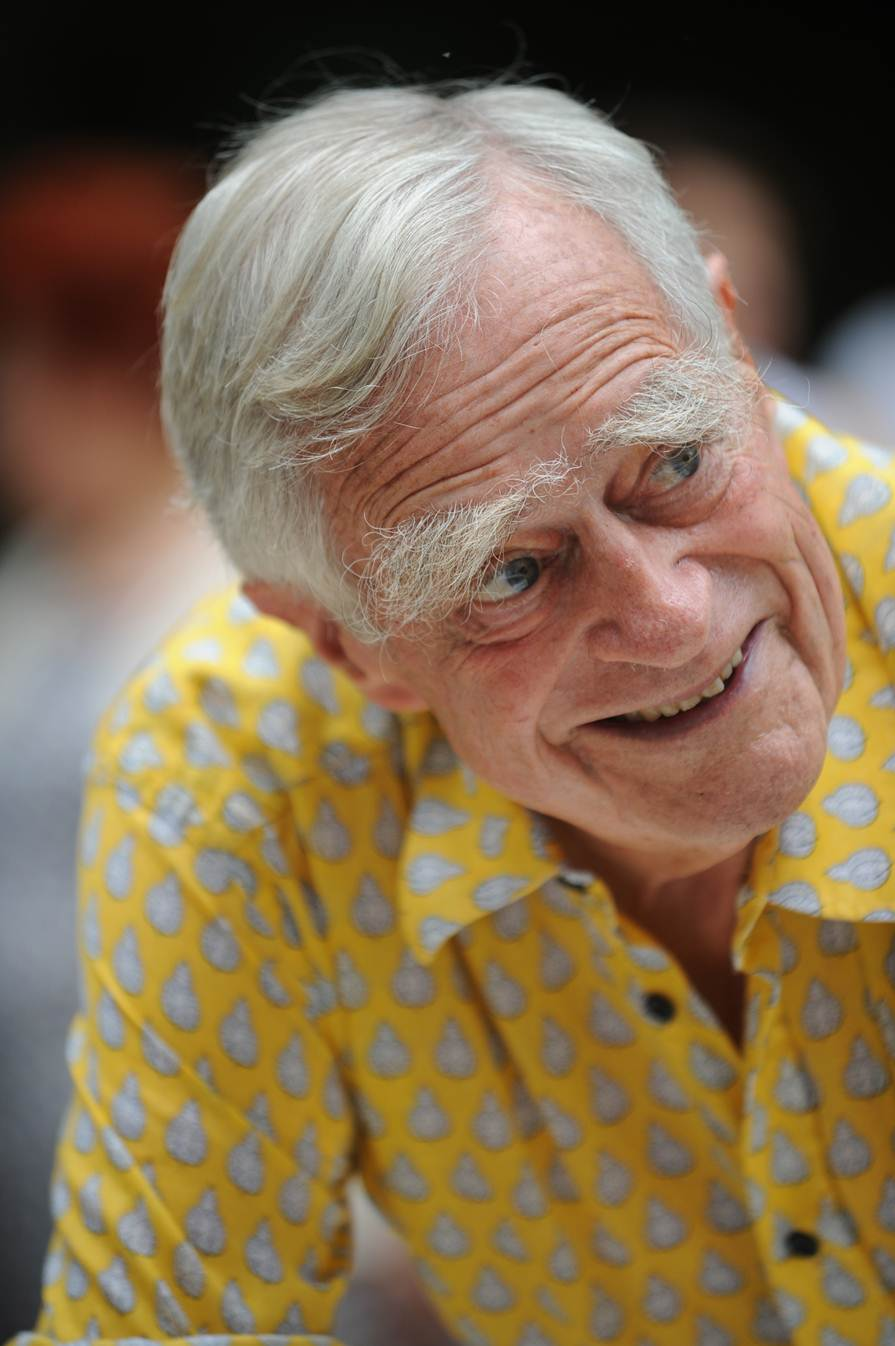
- Hoffmann in 2009
- Born: Hans Lukas Hoffmann; 23 January 1923; Basel, Switzerland
- Died: 21 July 2016 (aged 93); Camargue, France
- Occupations: Ornithologist, conservationist, philanthropist
- Known for: Co-founder and first president of the WWF International
- Spouse: Daria Razumovsky
- Children: 4, including André Hoffmann, Vera Michalski and Maja Hoffmann
- Relatives: Fritz Hoffmann-La Roche (grandfather)

Hans Lukas "Luc" Hoffmann (23 January 1923 – 21 July 2016) was a Swiss ornithologist, conservationist, and philanthropist. He co-founded the World Wildlife Fund (WWF), helped establish the Ramsar Convention for the protection of wetlands, and set up the Tour du Valat research centre in the Camargue area of France.

In 2012, Luc Hoffmann's MAVA Foundation, along with WWF International, established the Luc Hoffmann Institute. He was the author of more than 60 books, mostly ornithological.

== Early life ==
Luc Hoffmann was born in Basel, the second son of the businessman and art-lover Emanuel Hoffmann and the sculptor Maja Hoffmann-Stehlin. The following year, Luc's older brother died of leukemia.

His widowed mother remarried, to Swiss composer Paul Sacher. Despite the family's great wealth, Hoffmann was raised frugally. His enthusiasm for the natural world developed during his childhood and he spent much of his free time bird watching in the Basel area. His first academic paper, "Der Durchzug der Strandvögel in der Umgebung Basels" (The passage of seabirds in the vicinity of Basel) appeared in Der Ornithologische Beobachter (The Bird Observer) in 1941, when he was still a schoolboy.

In 1941, Hoffman enrolled at the University of Basel, studying botany and zoology. In 1943 he was conscripted into the Swiss Army, rising to the rank of lieutenant.

After the end of the Second World War, Hoffmann conducted scientific research and earned a doctorate (PhD) for his work on the different colour patterns of the chicks of the common tern (Sterna hirundo) in the Camargue on the Mediterranean coast of France. His supervisor at the University of Basel was Adolf Portmann.

== Conservation work ==
In 1947, Hoffmann bought an estate in the Camargue. In 1954 he established the Tour du Valat biological research station on it. The continued presence of greater flamingo (Phoenicopterus roseus) in France has been attributed to conservation work conducted at Tour du Valat. Hoffmann also supported breeding of Przewalski's horse (Equus ferus przewalskii) nearby and the reintroduction of the indigenous animals to their native Mongolia in 2004.

Generations of ecologists have trained at Tour du Valat, including John Krebs. More than 60 Ph.D.s have been awarded for research conducted at Tour du Valat by students enrolled at universities in France, Germany, Switzerland, Italy, Canada and the United Kingdom. From 1953 to 1996, Hoffmann was on the board of Hoffmann-la Roche.

With Peter Scott, Julian Huxley, Max Nicholson and others, Hoffmann became a founder member in 1961 of the World Wildlife Fund. He was appointed as its vice-president at the inaugural meeting and served in that role until 1988. He was made vice-president emeritus in 1998. Hoffmann helped establish the Doñana National Park in Andalusia in 1963. He also helped set up the national appeal in Austria in 1963. In the 1980s he served as president of the French national appeal.

Hoffmann was one of the founding fathers of the Ramsar Convention, one of the first intergovernmental treaties to protect the environment. The convention aims to conserve wetlands: land that is permanently or periodically covered by shallow water and which typically hosts migratory birds. Some 160 countries have so far contracted to protect their wetlands under the convention, which was devised in 1971 and came into force in 1975.

In 1994, Hoffmann established the MAVA Foundation, which distributes grants for nature conservation in the Mediterranean, the west coast of Africa and the Alps. Yolande Clergue's original ambition to create a Fondation Van Gogh was given new momentum by Luc Hoffmann, who established a permanent framework in 2008 called Fondation Vincent van Gogh Arles for activities designed to preserve the memory of Vincent van Gogh in Arles and to foster contemporary art.

In 2012, The MAVA Foundation and WWF International established the Luc Hoffmann Institute to honour the conservation legacy of Luc Hoffmann. The Institute focuses on catalyzing new scientific ideas to solve this century's increasingly complex and interconnected conservation challenges. His son, André Hoffmann, is on the Institute's Advisory Board.

Hoffmann also made significant contributions to nature conservation in: the Neusiedler See in Austria; the Hortobágy National Park in Hungary; the Prespa region that straddles Greece, Albania and Macedonia; and the Banc d'Arguin National Park in Mauritania.

In 2003, a major endowment in honour of Hoffmann's eightieth birthday provided for establishment of the Luc Hoffmann Chair in Field Ornithology at Oxford University's Edward Grey Institute of Field Ornithology.

== Awards ==
- Honorary Doctorate from the University of Basel (2001)
- Euronature-Environmental Prize (2007)
- Fellow of the American Association for the Advancement of Science (1973)
- Chevalier of the National Order of the Légion d'honneur (1989)
- Duke of Edinburgh Conservation Medal, awarded by the World Wide Fund for Nature (1998)
- John C Phillips Medal, awarded by the International Union for the Conservation of Nature (2004).
- Honorary Doctorate Degree from Business School Lausanne (2013)

== Marriage and family ==
Hoffmann's grandfather, Fritz Hoffmann-La Roche, founded the company Hoffmann-La Roche in 1896. He was the son of industrialist Emanuel "Manno" Hoffmann (1896–1932) and sculptor Maja born Stehlin (1896–1989), and the brother of Vera Oeri-Hoffmann.

Hoffman's family is the majority shareholder in the pharmaceuticals company Hoffmann-La Roche. He used his wealth to endow the MAVA Foundation, which funds nature conservation projects worldwide. He was a chevalier of the National Order of the Légion d'honneur and a fellow of the American Association for the Advancement of Science.

In 1953, in Vienna, Hoffmann married Daria Razumovsky (1925-2002), the second child of Count Andreas Razumovsky and Princess Katharina Nikolajevna Sayn-Wittgenstein, who fled Russia in 1918 after the October Revolution. Together they had four children: Vera, Maja, André, and Daschenka.
