= Maja Hoffmann =

Swiss art collector and philanthropist

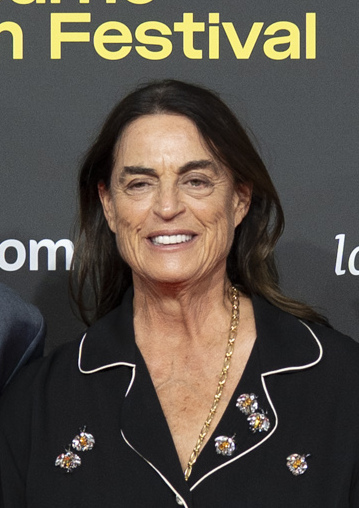
Maja Hoffmann in 2025 at the Locarno Film Festival.

Maja Hoffmann (born 1956) is a Swiss billionaire, art collector, art patron, documentary producer, and businesswoman. She is the founder and president of the LUMA Foundation, as well as the president of the Locarno Film Festival. She is also part of the shareholder pool made up of descendants of the founder of the Roche Holding AG, which controls the Swiss health-care company Hoffmann-La Roche.

== Early life and education ==
Hoffmann is the granddaughter of the industrialist Emanuel (Manno) Hoffmann (1896-1932), daughter of Daria Hoffmann-Razumovsky (1925–2002) and the pharmaceutical magnate and renowned naturalist Luc Hoffmann (1923–2016). She grew up in the Camargue region of southern France. Her sister is the publisher and philanthropist Vera Michalski and her brother is the businessman André Hoffmann. Maja's other sister, Daria (Daschenka) Hoffmann, died in 2019 at the age of 59.

Hoffmann's grandmother, Maja Stehlin (1896–1989), collected Pablo Picasso, Jean Arp, Fernand Léger, Jean Tinguely and Georges Braque. She created the Emanuel Hoffmann Foundation (whose collection forms the main core of the Schaulager) in 1933 to honor her grandfather Emanuel, who had died when his car was hit by a train when her father, Luc, was still a child.

In the 1980s, Maja studied film at the New School and at New York University in New York City. She then made a documentary film about the fishermen of the Sahara.

== Art collecting ==
Maja Hoffmann (left) (2015)

Hoffmann began her art collecting in the 1980s in New York City in the company of Swiss theatre director Werner Düggelin. They encountered and purchased works there by Julian Schnabel, Jean-Michel Basquiat, Francesco Clemente, Andy Warhol and others.

In 2015, Steidl published a book offering insight into the private contemporary art and design collection of Hoffmann. The collection is distributed in her various dwelling locations in Arles, Zurich, Gstaad, London and Mustique. The book contains photos by photographer François Halard of these locations mixed with Rirkrit Tiravanija's use of the British nursery rhyme "This is the House that Jack Built".

== Documentary film executive production ==
As an executive producer, Hoffmann has realised a number of documentary films, including Peggy Guggenheim: Art Addict, Marina Abramovic: The Artist Is Present, Bobby Fischer Against the World, Black White + Gray: A Portrait of Sam Wagstaff and Robert Mapplethorpe, The Party's Over, and Jean-Michel Basquiat: The Radiant Child.

== Philanthropy ==
Hoffmann's philanthropy supports contemporary art, film, and environmental programmes around the world. In the 1990s, she worked at Luc Hoffmann's La Tour du Valat, focusing in on the breeding of the Przewalski’s horse (Equus ferus przewalskii) and she helped reintroduce them to their native Mongolia in 2004.

Hoffmann currently is active with her philanthropy at the Rencontres d'Arles in Arles, the Venice Biennale, the Serpentine Galleries in London, and Human Rights Watch in New York. She is president of the Swiss Institute Contemporary Art New York, Fondation Vincent van Gogh Arles, Kunsthalle Zürich and Vice-President of the Emanuel Hoffmann Foundation in Switzerland, whose art collection was started by her grandparents and is now part of the Museum of Contemporary Art (Basel).

Hoffmann also serves as a board member of Serpentine Galleries and Tate's International Council (London), New York’s New Museum, The Africa Center, and Center for Curatorial Studies, Bard College.

Hoffmann was part of the jury which selected Clément Cogitore as winner of the Marcel Duchamp Prize in 2018. In 2023 Hoffmann became the first female board president for the Locarno Film Festival.

== LUMA Foundation ==
In 2004, Hoffmann founded the LUMA Foundation (Zurich) as a vehicle to express her ongoing artistic commitments, followed by LUMA Arles (France) in 2013, an experimental and cross-disciplinary platform dedicated to the production of exhibitions, art and ideas, research, education, and archives. Located at the Parc des Ateliers in Arles, a former industrial site, LUMA Foundation includes a resource center designed by architect Frank Gehry; various industrial buildings rehabilitated by Annabelle Selldorf; and a public park designed by landscape architect Bas Smets. The site’s main building, the LUMA Tower by Gehry, opened in the summer of 2021.

Hoffmann works closely with a core group of art advisors that include Tom Eccles (executive director and associate exhibition curator at the Center for Curatorial Studies, Bard College), artist Liam Gillick, curator Hans Ulrich Obrist, artist Philippe Parreno and curator Beatrix Ruf on a program of exhibitions and multidisciplinary projects presented each year in the site’s newly rehabilitated venues.

== Locarno Film Festival ==
In July 2023, Hoffmann was designated by the Board of Directors as the next president of the Locarno Film Festival. Her appointment was formally confirmed by the Extraordinary General Assembly in September 2023, and she officially succeeded Marco Solari as President in 2024, becoming the first woman to lead the Festival in its history.

== La Chassagnette ==
Hoffmann also runs the Michelin-starred organic restaurant La Chassagnette, an organic restaurant in the Camargue outside Arles whose chef is Armand Arnal.

== Personal life ==
Hoffmann has two adult children with the film producer Stanley F. Buchthal, who in some of Hoffmann's films, acts as co-executive producer. Buchthal, who comes from Teaneck, New Jersey was a founder of the Bugle Boy company and now runs his own media company, with Liz Garbus, The Dakota Group Limited. He is also on the board of directors of Film Forum in New York City and has also helped fund, executive produce, or support specific documentary projects, such as Marina Abramović: The Artist Is Present.
