= Karl von der Mühll =

Swiss mathematician and physicist

- Born: September 13, 1841; Basel, Switzerland
- Died: May 9, 1912 (aged 70); Basel, Switzerland
- Resting place: Wolfgottesacker cemetery
- Education: University of Basel; University of Göttingen; Leipzig University
- Scientific career
- Fields: Mathematics; Physics
- Workplaces: Leipzig University

Karl von der Mühll (September 13, 1841, in Basel, Switzerland – May 9, 1912, in Basel) was a Swiss mathematician and physicist.

He was born into the Von der Mühll family, of the Basel patriciate (see Daig), to Karl Georg and Emilie Merian, of the Merian family, a granddaughter of Peter Merian.

After graduating from high school in 1859, Von der Mühll studied natural sciences and mathematics at the University of Basel, with amongst others, Gustav Heinrich Wiedemann, and from 1861 studied at the Georg-August University in Göttingen with Bernhard Riemann, Wilhelm Eduard Weber, Wilhelm Klinkerfues and Friedrich Wöhler. From 1863, he continued his studies at the Albertus University in Königsberg, where he turned to mathematical physics under Franz Ernst Neumann and received his doctorate in 1866. He also studied there with the mathematician Friedrich Julius Richelot. In 1866/67, he studied at the Sorbonne in Paris. Shortly after, in 1868, he completed his studies in Leipzig in mathematical physics and in 1872 he became an associate professor at the university. In 1889, he left Leipzig for Basel and became associate professor and in 1890 professor for mathematical physics at Basel University. In 1896, he became the university's financial administrator (Curator fiscorum academicorum). In the academic years 1895/96 and 1910/11, he was rector of the university. In 1887, he was elected a member of the German National Academy of Sciences Leopoldina.

He was president of the Swiss Euler Commission (and thus editor of Leonhard Euler's works) and published Franz Neumann's lectures on electrical currents in 1884. From 1872 he was co-editor of the Mathematische Annalen.

In 1875 he married Katharina His, daughter of Eduard His, also of the Basel Daig.

Having suffered from several bouts of depression throughout his life, Von der Mühll committed suicide in 1912 and is buried in the Wolfgottesacker cemetery in Basel.
