= LUMA Arles =

Arts centre in Arles, France

Coordinates: 43.673333°N 4.636944°E

LUMA Tower

Luma Arles is an arts center in Arles, France created by the LUMA Foundation headed by Swiss arts patron Maja Hoffmann. It encompasses several renovated former railroad factories and the LUMA Tower, a 15,000 square meter tower building designed by the Canadian-American architect Frank Gehry for the LUMA Foundation. For the building Gehry took some of his inspiration from the Post-Impressionist painter Vincent van Gogh, hoping to catch the light the Dutch artist sought in the South of France, specifically as in Starry Night which was painted in Arles in 1889. The skin of the building features 11,000 angled reflective stainless steel panels.

The center was founded by Maja Hoffmann, who heads the foundation and collaborated with Gehry on the tower's genesis. The building includes exhibition spaces, workshops, a library, an auditorium with 150 seats, and a café.

The magazine Artnet reported that the total cost of the project is understood to be 150 million euros, but Maja Hoffmann has refused to comment on the figure.

== See also ==
- List of works by Frank Gehry
