= Eric Koester =

American professor (born 1977)

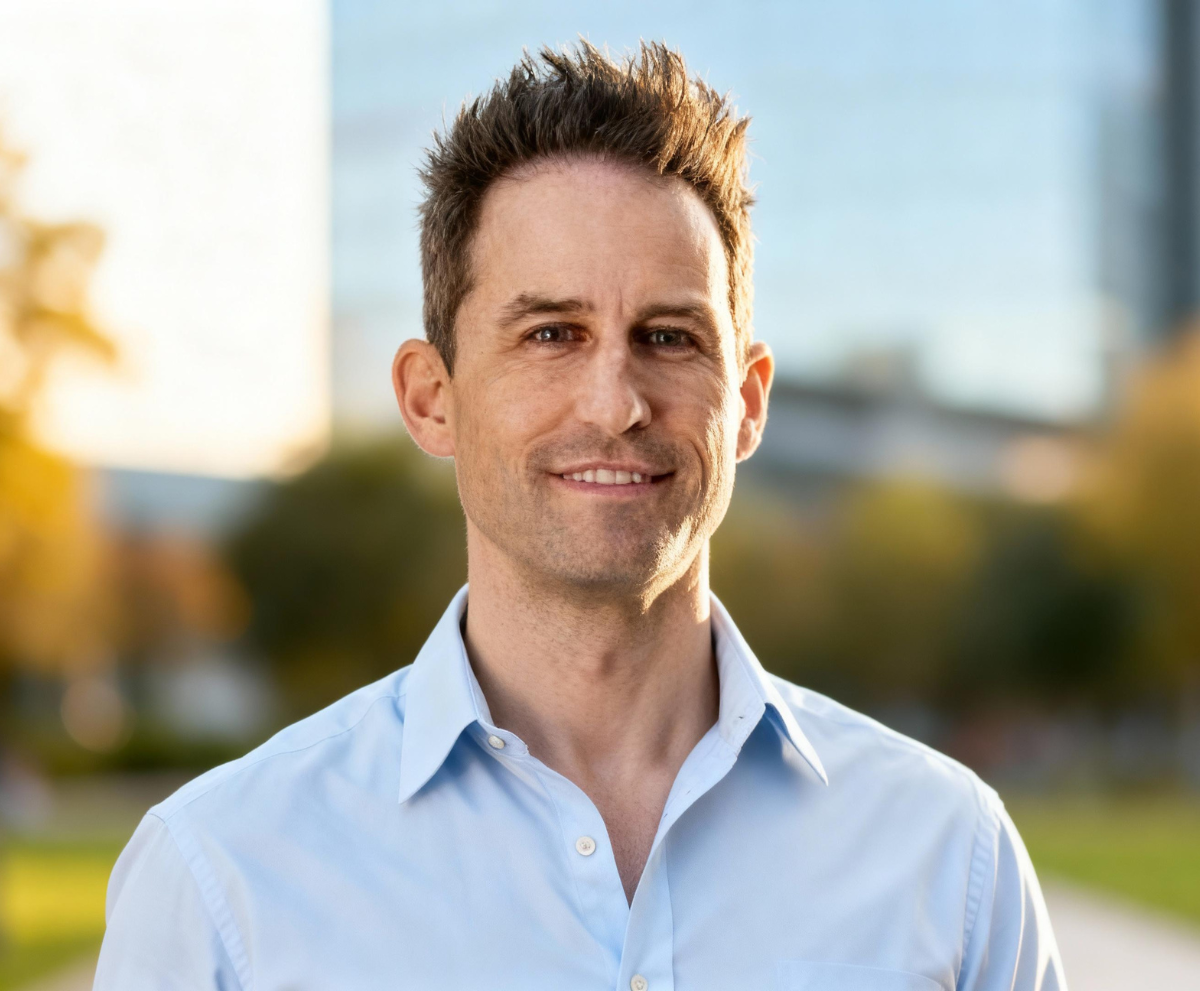
- Born: February 20, 1977 (age 49); Beaumont, Texas, US
- Education: Marquette University; The George Washington University Law School
- Occupation: Professor / Entrepreneur
- Website: erickoester.com

Eric Koester is an American academic and entrepreneur. He is a professor of entrepreneurship and innovation at Georgetown University and the founder of Manuscripts, an organization focused on writing and publishing support for authors. Koester is also known for his work in developing educational and community-based programs related to authorship and creative entrepreneurship..

== Early life and education ==
Koester was born in Beaumont, Texas, before his family moved to Omaha, Nebraska, when he was one. He started MEGO Consulting, his first company in 1992 and began publishing research and consulting reports, including his first book on plastics recycling for Mastio & Associates in 1994. He completed a BS in Finance & Marketing from Marquette University. He received his Juris Doctor from George Washington University Law School in Washington DC.

== Career ==
Koester started his career at Ventana Medical Systems, which Roche bought for $3.4 billion in 2008. In 2006, Koester joined Cooley LLP as a corporate securities attorney, especially for their emerging firms and venture capital practice.

In 2010, he joined the cloud marketing firm Appature as its director of operations and general counsel, and in 2011, he co-founded Zaarly with Bo Fishback and Ian Hunter. Among the investors in Zaarly were Ashton Kutcher, Meg Whitman, CEO of eBay, and Kleiner Perkins. Zaarly was recognized by Fast Company as one of the Fifty Most Innovative Companies in the World.

In 2013, he co-founded Main Street Genome with Scott Case (acquired in 2015). He was also appointed as the managing director of NextGen Venture Partners.

In 2013, Georgetown University recruited Koester as a professor of Entrepreneurship and Innovation.

In addition to his academic career, Koester founded Manuscripts, a B Corporation focused on writing and publishing support. The company was named among the fastest-growing education companies by Inc. and has supported thousands of authors in manuscript development and publishing, including numerous national and international award finalists and winners. He has helped thousands of individuals, with his course named 2018's Most Innovative by USASBE. He is also the host of The Modern Author podcast, which features conversations with authors and innovators.

His Book Creators community program has helped more than 1,500 first-time writers develop and publish their first books, and has generated more than fifty national book prize winners or finalists in 2020–2022.

== Awards and recognition ==
- Honored with the Forbes Next Top 1000 entrepreneurs of 2021
- Koester was named one of the 40 under 40 for Washington DC in 2012 by the Washington Business Journal.
- Named one of DCA Live's 40 Under 40
- USASBE National Entrepreneurship Educator of the Year (2020)
- Honored with Georgetown's only two-time entrepreneurship professor of the year.

== Books ==
- Founder, JD: How America's Top Lawyers Leverage their Law Degree in the Startup World and How You Can Too. New Degree Press. April 11, 2019. pp. 268 pages. ISBN 978-1641371780.
- Koester, Eric (1 November 2010). Green entrepreneur handbook : the guide to building and growing a green and clean business. Boca Raton: CRC Press. p. 460. ISBN 978-1439817292.
- The Pennymores and the Curse of the Invisible Quill. New Degree Press. 25 April 2022. p. 376. ISBN 979-8885040532.
- Super Mentors: The Ordinary Person's Guide to Asking Ex…. ISBN 979-8885042901.
