= Thomas Grogan =

American pathologist

- Education: University of Virginia; George Washington University Medical School; Stanford University
- Occupations: Chief Scientific Officer, Ventana Medical Systems, Inc. Professor Emeritus of Pathology, University of Arizona College of Medicine

Thomas Grogan is an American professor, pathologist and founder of Ventana Medical Systems, Inc. He currently holds the positions of Professor of Pathology at the University of Arizona College of Medicine and Chief Scientific Officer at Ventana.

== Education ==
Grogan received a B.A. in biology from the University of Virginia, and then continued his education at George Washington University Medical School where he earned his M.D. He later completed a post-doctorate, hematopathology fellowship at Stanford University.

== Career ==
Grogan serves as Chief Scientific Officer of Ventana and has served as its Director since founding the company in June 1985. Ventana was subsequently purchased by Roche in 2008 for $3.4 billion. Grogan also served as Chairman of Ventana from 1985 to 1995.

Grogan has taught at the University of Arizona College of Medicine since 1979 where he specializes in hematopathology and is now a professor emeritus. Among professional associations, he is a Lymphoma Biology Committee member and founding member of the International Lymphoma Study Group (ILSG), which formulated the current classification scheme for clinical practice.

== Patents and publications ==
Grogan holds the patents for the kinetic-mode process for automated Immunohistochemistry (IHC) and “in situ” hybridization (ISH) staining techniques.

Grogan has authored or co-authored more than 200 papers on lymphoma and myeloma, including contributing to a World Health Organization (WHO) publication, WHO Classification of Tumours of Haematopoietic and Lymphoid Tissue, that is part of a series on histological and genetic typing of human tumors that covers all leukemia and lymphoma types. It provides an international standard for oncologists and pathologists for use in the design of studies monitoring response to therapy and clinical outcomes. His 2019 autobiography as to Ventana is a 200-page book, Chasing the Invisible: A Doctor's Quest to Abolish the Last Unseen Cancer Cell.
