= LUMA Tower =

Tower in Arles, France

Coordinates: 43.673333°N 4.636944°E

Luma Tower

The LUMA Tower is a building designed by Frank Gehry for the LUMA Arles arts center in Arles, France, commissioned by arts patron Maja Hoffmann, founder of the LUMA Foundation. It was inaugurated on July 4, 2021.

== Design ==
About the outlook of the tower Gehry wrote: "We wanted to evoke the local, from Vincent van Gogh's painting Starry Night to the soaring rock clusters you find in the Camargue region. Its central drum echoes the circular plan of the Roman amphitheatre".

The building is 56 meters tall and has 12 floors (10 stories). It sits on a rotunda, "the Drum" of 54 metres in diameter and height 16 to 18 meters. The interior surface area is 15,000 sq.m., of which 2,000 sq.m. is dedicated for exhibitions and 1,4000 sq.m. for other purposes. It is covered with 11,000 angled reflective stainless steel panels.

The building includes exhibition spaces, workshops, a library, an auditorium with 150 seats, and a café.

== History ==
The first project for LUMA Arles was presented by Maja Hoffmann and Frank Gehry in July 2008 to the city of Arles. It was rejected for being too tall. Only the third attempt was accepted in December 2012. Construction started in 2014.
