= Jan Michalski =

Polish/Swiss/French book publisher

Jan Michalski

Jan Michalski (1953–2002) was a Polish book publisher who, along with Vera Michalski-Hoffmann, founded the Jan Michalski Foundation in Montricher, Switzerland which awards the annual Jan Michalski Prize in literature.

== Publishing ==
In 1986, Michalski and Vera Michalski-Hoffmann created Les Éditions Noir sur Blanc to publish Slavic writers of novels, short stories, plays and poetry as well as non-fiction essays, documents, personal journals and memoires. Noir sur Blanc was created in Romandy, then in Paris in 1990 and Warsaw in 1991. One of the first texts published was Proust contre la déchéance, a short essay written by the painter Józef Czapski between 1940 and 1941 when a prisoner in the Starobyelsk camp in the Soviet Union.

Subsequently, the (now married) couple acquired several publishing houses that were later brought together under the Lausanne-based holding group Libella. The holding now includes Noir sur Blanc, Les Éditions Phébus, Buchet-Chastel and Le Temps Apprivoisé, among others. They published in Polish books by Umberto Eco, Charles Bukowski, Henry Millar, Blaise Cendrars and many others. Polish authors, such as Sławomir Mrożek were translated into French and English and sold in their Librairie Polonaise book store, located on Boulevard Saint-Germain in Paris, which still exists. Subsequently, in 2000, they founded the Libella editorial group.

== Jan Michalski Foundation ==
In 2002, following the premature death of Jan Michalski at age 49, Hoffmann continued the project which resulted in the creation of the Jan Michalski Foundation in Montricher, Switzerland at the foot of the Jura Mountains. This foundation acquired a former summer camp and converted it into a cultural center focused on writing residencies. Several writers stay simultaneously for different lengths of time, never to exceed one year. Later, an exhibit space, an auditorium for concerts, symposiums, lectures or screenings and a library were added. The foundation awards certain writers with grants and from time to time underwrites certain publishing projects. Conceived as a place entirely dedicated to writing and literature, the Jan Michalski Foundation is committed to fostering literary creation and making all forms of written expression accessible to all. This commitment is further manifested through exhibitions and cultural events and financial support for literary projects. As part of the Jan Michalski Foundation, Vera Hoffmann-Michalski also created the Jan Michalski International Prize for Literature, designed to recognize great work, regardless of the genre (novels, short stories, essays, books on art, etc.). The prize is worth 50,000 Swiss francs.
