= Schaulager =

Museum in Münchenstein, Switzerland

Coordinates: 47°31′42″N 7°36′37″E

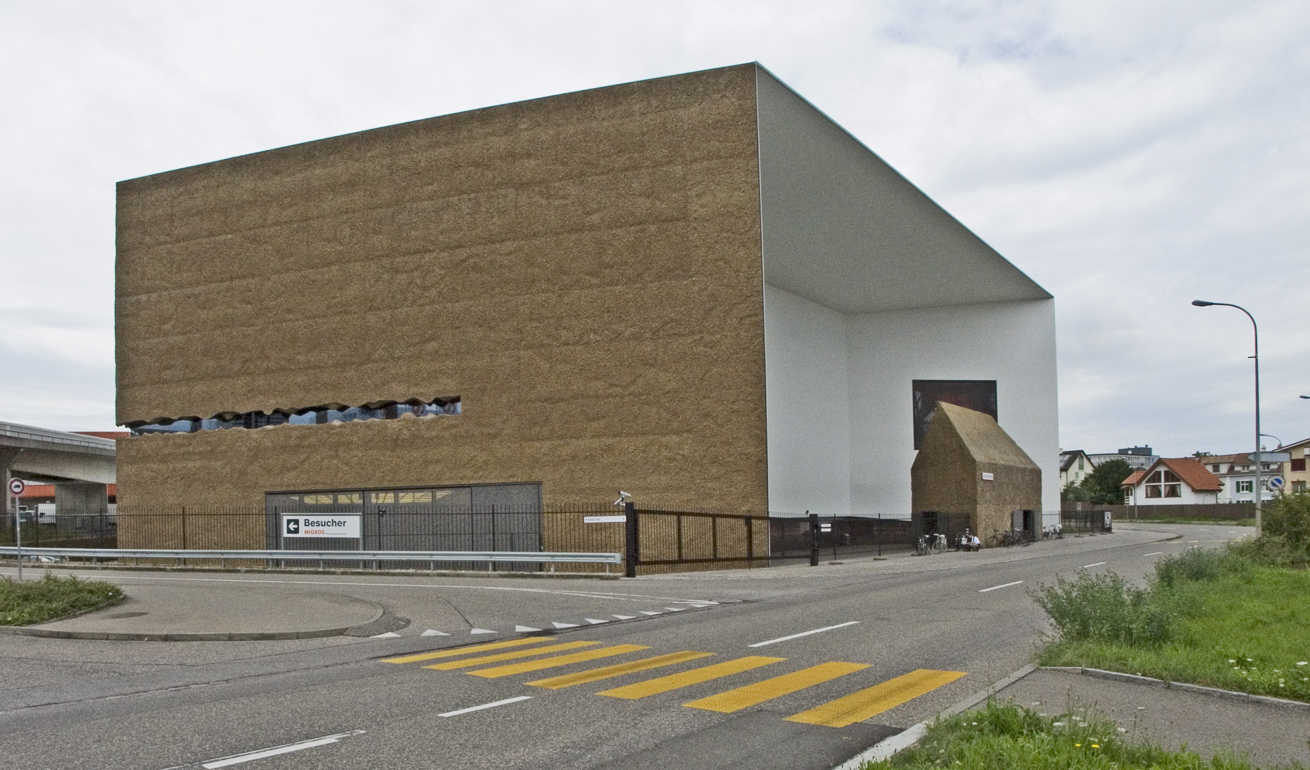
The Schaulager in Münchenstein/Basel

The Schaulager is a museum in Newmünchenstein, a sub-district of Münchenstein in the canton of Basel-Country, Switzerland.

Built in 2002/2003 under commission of the Laurenz Foundation, it was designed by the renowned architectural office of Herzog & de Meuron, the Schaulager opened in 2003. The Schaulager was conceived as an open warehouse that provides the optimal spatial and climatic conditions for the preservation of works of art.

The institution functions as a mix between public museum, art storage facility and art research institute. It is primarily directed at a specialist audience but is also open to the general public for special events and the annual exhibitions.

== Annual exhibitions ==
- 2003: Roth-Zeit. A retrospective on Dieter Roth
- 2004: Herzog & de Meuron. Number 250. An exposition
- 2005: Jeff Wall. Photographs from 1978 to 2004
- 2006: Tacita Dean. Analogue: Films, Photographs, Drawings 1991–2006
  and Francis Alÿs. "The Sign Painting Project (1993–97)": A revision»
- 2007: Robert Gober. Work 1976–2007
- 2008: Andrea Zittel, Monika Sosnowska. 1:1
- 2009: Holbein to Tillmans. Prominent guests from the Kunstmuseum Basel
- 2010: Matthew Barney. Prayer Sheet with the Wound and the Nail
- 2011: Francis Alÿs. Fabiol
- 2013: Steve McQueen.
- 2014: Paul Chan. Selected Works
- 2018: Bruce Nauman: Disappearing Acts (in collaboration with MoMa)

The collection from the Emanuel Hoffmann Foundation forms the main core of the Schaulager exhibits. This collection was founded in 1933 by Maja Hoffmann-Stehlin (* 7. August 1896; † 8. August 1989), later known as Maja Sacher, wife of Paul Sacher (* 28 April 1906 – † 26 May 1999).

== See also ==
- Museums in Basel
