= Henri-Robert von der Mühll =

Swiss architect

- Born: 5 October 1898; Modenheim-Illzach, France
- Died: 17 November 1980 (aged 82); Morges, Switzerland
- Occupation: Architect

Henri-Robert von der Mühll (5 October 1898 – 17 November 1980) was a Swiss architect and member of the Von der Mühll family. His work was part of the architecture event in the art competition at the 1928 Summer Olympics.

After having studied architecture at the Swiss Federal Institute of Technology in Zürich, he trained in several European cities before opening his own studio in Lausanne in 1925. He was co-founder of the Congrès Internationaux d'Architecture Moderne with, amongst others Le Corbusier, and co-signatory of the Sarraz manifesto.

His achievements mainly concern the city of Lausanne where he designed and built the La Chandoline building in 1933–34 and was responsible for the development of the Valency district in 1948–1953. He also designed and created various private commissions, gardens and parks. He was technical director of the company Winckler SA in Fribourg from 1945 to 1948, where he developed the prefabricated house Multiplan.

He authored several publications, in particular on national and regional planning, several containing his illustrations, produced posters as well as stamps. He was member of the Federal Fine Arts Commission (1957–1964).

In 1973, he published a work entitled De l'architecture. The collection of his archives has been kept at the École Polytechnique Fédérale de Lausanne since his death in 1980.
