= Olesoxime =

Chemical compound

Identifiers
- IUPAC name: (NZ)-N-[(8S,9S,10R,13R,14S,17R)-10,13-dimethyl-17-[(2R)-6-methylheptan-2-yl]-1,2,6,7,8,9,11,12,14,15,16,17-dodecahydrocyclopenta[a]phenanthren-3-ylidene]hydroxylamine
- CAS Number: 22033-87-0
- PubChem CID: 21763506
- ChemSpider: 23350363
- UNII: A6778U5IFY
- KEGG: D11213
- CompTox Dashboard (EPA): DTXSID001029582

Chemical and physical data
- Formula: C_{27}H_{45}NO
- Molar mass: 399.663 g·mol^{−1}
- 3D model (JSmol): Interactive image
- SMILES: C[C@H](CCCC(C)C)[C@H]1CC[C@@H]2[C@@]1(CC[C@H]3[C@H]2CCC4=C/C(=N\O)/CC[C@]34C)C
- InChI: InChI=1S/C27H45NO/c1-18(2)7-6-8-19(3)23-11-12-24-22-10-9-20-17-21(28-29)13-15-26(20,4)25(22)14-16-27(23,24)5/h17-19,22-25,29H,6-16H2,1-5H3/t19-,22+,23-,24+,25+,26+,27-/m1/s1; Key:QNTASHOAVRSLMD-GYKMGIIDSA-N

Olesoxime (TRO19622) is an experimental drug formerly under development by the now-defunct French company Trophos as a treatment for a range of neuromuscular disorders. It has a cholesterol-like structure and belongs to the cholesterol-oxime family of mitochondrial pore modulators.

== Research ==
In preclinical studies, the compound displayed neuroprotective properties by promoting the function and survival of neurons and other cell types under disease-relevant stress conditions. It did so through interactions with two components of the mitochondrial permeability transition pore (mPTP), VDAC and TSPO. In preclinical studies on Huntington's disease, the disease-attenuating effects of olesoxime were attributed to modulating the activity of calcium-dependent proteases called calpains.

A 2009–2011 phase 3 clinical trial in amyotrophic lateral sclerosis did not demonstrate an increase in survival. A 2011–2013 trial in spinal muscular atrophy (SMA) indicated that the compound may prevent deterioration of muscle function. In 2015, the entire olesoxime programme was purchased by Hoffmann-La Roche for €120 million with a view to developing a treatment for SMA. However, in June 2018, faced with technical and regulatory challenges and competition from a potentially more effective drug nusinersen, Roche halted further development of olesoxime.
