= Vera Michalski =

Swiss businesswoman (born 1954)

Vera Michalski-Hoffmann
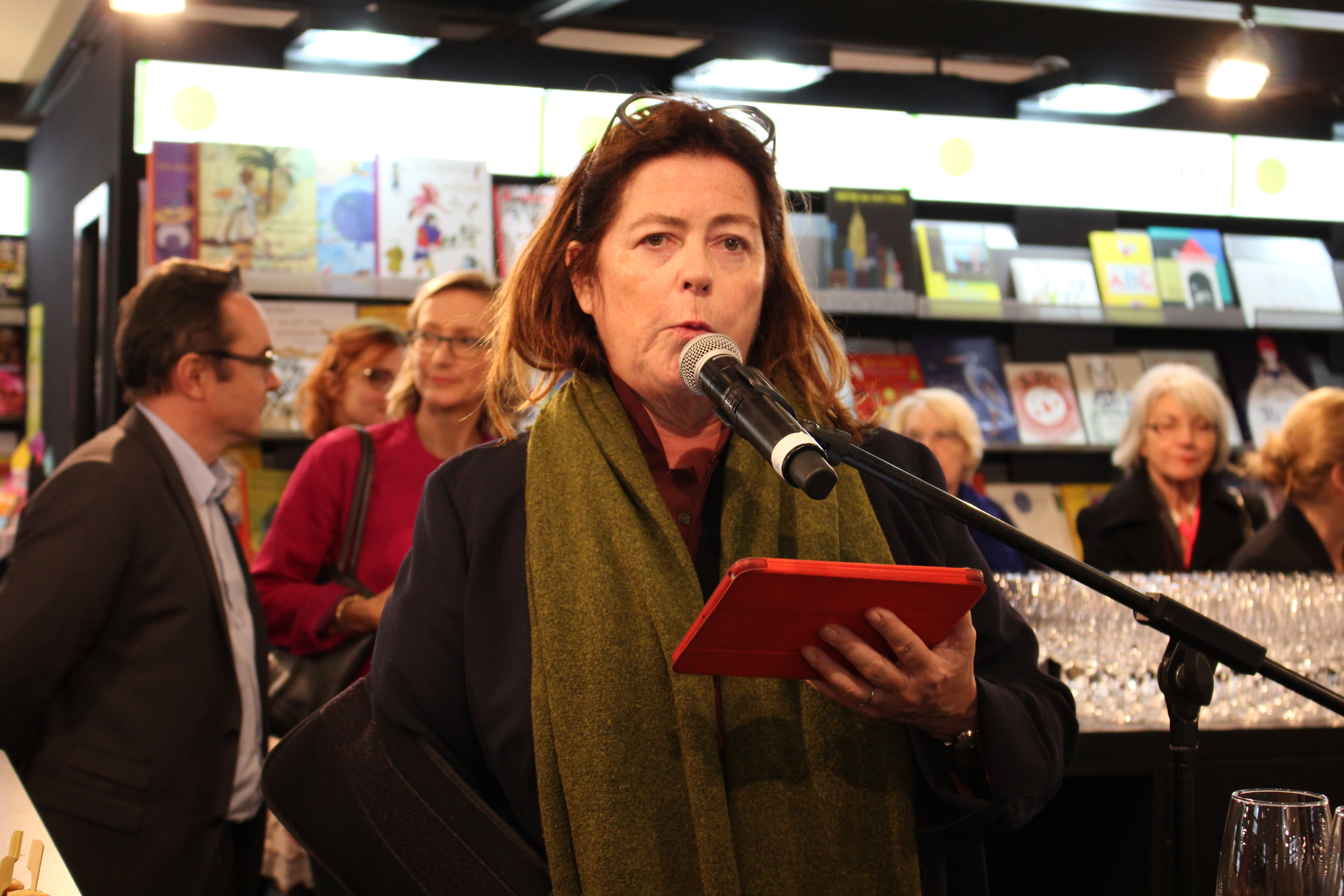
- Vera Michalski-Hoffmann in 2015
- Born: 5 November 1954 (age 71); Basel, Switzerland
- Education: Graduate Institute of International and Development Studies, Geneva
- Occupation: Publisher
- Father: Luc Hoffmann
- Relatives: André Hoffmann (brother); Maja Hoffmann (sister)

Vera Michalski-Hoffmann (born 5 November 1954) is a Swiss billionaire businesswoman, significant shareholder in Roche Holding and publisher. She is the president of several publishing houses in Switzerland, France and Poland, grouped together in the holding company Libella SA that is based in Lausanne. She founded the Jan Michalski Foundation in Montricher, that awards the annual Jan Michalski Prize in literature.Her wealth is derived from inheritance, and she owns 1.5% of Roche Holding.

== Biography ==
Until the age of 20, Vera Hoffmann (of Swiss and Austrian origin) lived in Camargue, at the Tour du Valat research facility, 28 km (17 mi) from Arles. It had an agricultural dimension and its electricity was supplied by a generator.

Her father, Luc Hoffmann (1923–2016), founded the centre. Equipped with a PhD in zoology, he dedicated much of his time, thoughts and funds to preserving and protecting nature. In 1961, he and Peter Scott, son of the famous South Pole explorer, founded the World Wildlife Fund (WWF). The research center, now supported by the Hoffman family's MAVA Foundation, has become an important international hub for the conservation and study of Mediterranean wetlands. The Foundation, owns nearly 2,500 hectares of wetlands in the Camargue region and is responsible for protecting the area.

Vera's grandmother, Maja Stehlin (1896–1989), collected Pablo Picasso, Jean Arp, Fernand Léger, Jean Tinguely and Georges Braque and created the Emanuel Hoffmann Foundation (whose collection forms the main core of the Schaulager) in 1933 to honor her grandfather Emanuel, who had died when his car was hit by a train when her father, Luc Hoffmann, was still a child.

During her childhood, Vera Hoffmann attended a private school created by her parents and accredited by the French authorities. Its approximately 14 children included Vera's sister Maja Hoffmann and brother André. Most of the other students were children of people who worked at the ornithological facility, along with those of a few poor neighbors.

Vera's mother, Daria Razumovsky, was a descendant of Austrian and Russian immigrants who had fled their homeland during the Russian Revolution. The story of her grandmother's childhood (from 1914 to 1919) was published and translated in 1990. In 2004, a compiled diary kept by Vera's mother and two aunts was also published.

Vera studied at the Graduate Institute of International and Development Studies (IHEID) in Geneva where she began working on her thesis entitled “Le phénomène des compagnons de route du communisme en France, de 1928 à 1939” (The phenomenon of Communism's fellow travelers in France from 1928 to 1939”). However, she decided to interrupt her doctorate studies to focus on publishing.

In 1983, she married a Polish man named Jan Michalski (1953-2002), whom she met when they were both students at the University of Geneva.

In October 2016, Michalski-Hoffmann was named UNESCO Goodwill Ambassador for culture and education. and in 2018 she took over a historic hotel in Warsaw, rebranded it as the Raffles Hotel Europejski.

== Publishing ==
In 1986, Michalski-Hoffmann created Les Éditions Noir sur Blanc in Montricher with her husband, Jan Michalski. The idea was to publish writers –essentially of Slavic origin– and to offer fiction (novels, short stories, plays and poetry) as well as non-fiction (essays, documents, eye-witness accounts, personal journal and memoires) bearing witness to critical periods in the history of countries such as Poland and Russia.

Michalski-Hoffmann presided over Libella, which brings together the French publishing houses Buchet/Chastel, Phébus, Libretto, Les Cahiers dessinés, and Delpire, as well as the Librairie polonaise in Paris. In Poland, Michalski owns Oficyna Literacka (Noir sur Blanc) in Warsaw and Wydawnictwo Literackie Kraków. In 1991, Michalski bought The Polish Bookshop in Paris, called Librairie Polonaise, at 123 Boulevard Saint-Germain.

Although Michalski-Hoffmann is heiress to the significant family fortune of Luc Hoffmann, she says she is careful to keep her publishing business separate from her philanthropic initiatives, notably the Maison de l'écriture (writing house) in Montricher, Switzerland. She does, however, admit that she can take certain risks which other, less financially secure publishers might not, and she can also publish niche-target works. Still, all her editorial projects are intended to be profitable.

Through her publishing business, Michalski aims to provide a bridge between Eastern and Western cultures. She and her husband began working in this area in 1986, before the Fall of the Berlin Wall, when cultural exchanges were rather difficult. She speaks five languages fluently (French, German, English, Spanish and Polish) and some Russian.

== Honors and awards ==
In 2010, Michalski-Hoffmann received the Lilas de l'éditrice award. Vera has been awarded prestigious awards during her career, including the Officer of the Order of Merit of the Republic of Poland (1995), the Knight of the Order of Arts and Letters of the French Republic, the Meritorious for Polish Culture (2011) and the Polish "Bene Merito" honorary distinction (2012).

== Cultural philanthropy ==
In the autumn of 2007, Michalski-Hoffmann announced the creation of the Jan Michalski Foundation in Montricher, Switzerland at the foot of the Jura Mountains, designed by architects Vincent Mangeat and Pierre Wahlen. This foundation acquired a former summer camp and converted it into a cultural center focused on writing residencies. Several writers stay simultaneously for different lengths of time, never to exceed one year. Later, an exhibit space, an auditorium for concerts, symposiums, lectures or screenings and a library were added. The foundation awards certain writers with grants and from time to time underwrites certain publishing projects. Conceived as a place entirely dedicated to writing and literature, the Jan Michalski Foundation is committed to fostering literary creation and making all forms of written expression accessible to all. This commitment is further manifested through exhibitions and cultural events and financial support for literary projects.

As part of the Jan Michalski Foundation, Vera Michalski-Hoffmann also created the Jan Michalski International Prize for Literature, designed to recognize great work, regardless of the genre (novels, short stories, essays, books on art, etc.). The prize is worth 50,000 Swiss francs.

Vera Michalski-Hoffmann also supports the promotion of classical music and is a member of Honors of the Swiss classical music festival Les Sommets Musicaux de Gstaad. Also, she extended an extensive patronage and financial backing to the legendary American avant-garde theater director Robert Wilson.
