= Trophos =

- Company type: Privately held company
- Industry: research and development in biotechnology
- Founded: Marseille, France (1999)
- Founder: Christopher Henderson; Olivier Pourquie; Jean-Louis Kraus; Antoine Beret; Michel Delaage
- Defunct: 2015
- Fate: Acquired by Hoffmann-La Roche
- Headquarters: France

Trophos was a biopharmaceutical company specialising in the discovery and development of novel therapeutics to treat both orphan neurodegenerative diseases and more prevalent disorders.

Trophos was founded in 1999 in Marseille by three scientists: Christopher Henderson, Olivier Pourquie and Jean-Louis Kraus, and two entrepreneurs: Antoine Beret and Michel Delaage. Trophos' lead compound was olesoxime (TRO19622), a mitochondrial targeted compound developed to treat neurodegenerative diseases.

In January 2015, Hoffmann-La Roche announced its intention to buy Trophos for €120,000,000 upfront and up to €350,000,000 in milestone performance payments. The deal was completed shortly afterwards.
