= André Hoffmann (businessman) =

Swiss businessman (born 1958)

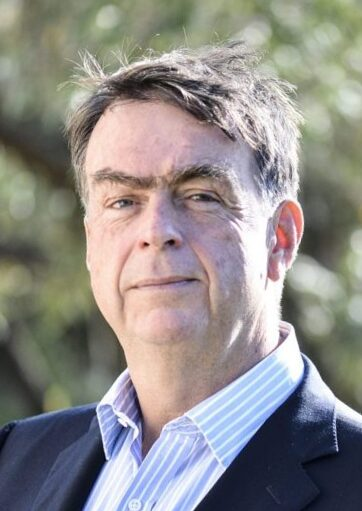
- Hoffmann in 2022
- Born: 31 May 1958 (age 68); Basel, Switzerland
- Education: University of St. Gallen; INSEAD
- Occupation: Businessman
- Title: Vice-chairman, Hoffmann-La Roche
- Spouse: Rosalie Coombe-Tennant
- Children: 3
- Parent: Luc Hoffmann
- Relatives: Fritz Hoffmann-La Roche (great-grandfather); Vera Michalski (sister); Maja Hoffmann (sister)

André Hoffmann (born 31 May 1958) is a Swiss billionaire businessman, environmentalist and philanthropist.

He is the great-grandson of Fritz Hoffmann-La Roche, founder of Roche Holding, and is the vice-chairman of the company. As of August 2026, his estimated net worth is US$10.7 billion.

As a philanthropist, he has been an advocate for sustainability and environmental protection, and was international vice-president of the World Wide Fund for Nature (WWF) from 2007 to 2017. He has also been on the boards of Wetlands International, a non-profit organisation dedicated to the conservation and restoration of wetland ecosystems.

== Early life ==
Born on 31 May 1958 in Basel, Switzerland, André Hoffmann is the son of Daria Hoffmann-Razumovsky and Luc Hoffmann, a conservationist and philanthropist.

He studied economics at the University of St. Gallen, and holds an MBA from INSEAD, completed in 1990.

== Career ==
In 1991, Hoffmann joined Nestlé UK. Three years later, he established a family office specialized in wealth management.

In 1996, he became a member of the board of Roche holding, the world's second-largest pharmaceutical company, established by his grandfather.

He owns 1.5% of the company and has been vice chairman since 2006.

He is on the board of Genentech, a fully owned subsidiary based in San Francisco, California.

An early investor in the Maryland-based start-up Inovalon, which manages and analyses healthcare data, and is a non-executive director.

He is a member of the Club of Rome, a member of the board of Trustees of the World Economic Forum, a member the Center for the Fourth Industrial Revolution in San Francisco, and a member of the board of SystemIQ, a company that intends to “drive positive disruption in economic systems”.

== Philanthropy ==
=== Nature preservation ===
Hoffmann is an environmentalist, involved in a number of nonprofit organizations and initiatives related to sustainability and nature conservation.

In 1998, he joined the WWF and was a vice-president of the organization from 2007 to 2017.

Since 2010, he has been president of the MAVA Foundation, a major foundation in the field of nature preservation.

In 2016, he became president of Fondation Tour du Valat, a French research institute dedicated to Mediterranean wetland conservation.

He has also been on the boards of Wetlands International, Global Footprint Network and FIBA.

=== Education ===
In August 2018, Hoffmann and his wife Rosalie made a €40 million commitment to INSEAD, establishing the Hoffmann Global Institute for Business and Society. He is currently the chairman of its advisory board.

In 2024, he made a £3.3million donation, alongside his wife, to the University of Exeter to fund research in providing solutions to climate change-related problems and mobilising action to mitigate the effects of climate change.

=== Other board memberships and positions ===
Hoffmann is also:

- A member of the Club of Rome
- Vice-chairman of the Board at the Venture Foundation
- Chairman of the Capitals Coalition Board
- A member of The Royal Institute of International Affairs and Senior Adviser at Chatham House, its think tank

== Personal life ==
Hoffmann is married to Rosalie Coombe-Tennant. They have three children. He owns several vineyards. In 2017, he purchased the domain Jayer Gilles in Burgundy, which became Hoffmann Jayer, with an emphasis on environment and nature preservation. He also owns Domain Pierre Latine in Yvorne, Switzerland and domain Alpamanta in Argentina.

In 2022, he and his wife were awarded a joint Honorary Degree for their contributions and support to conservation research.
