= Carl Passavant =

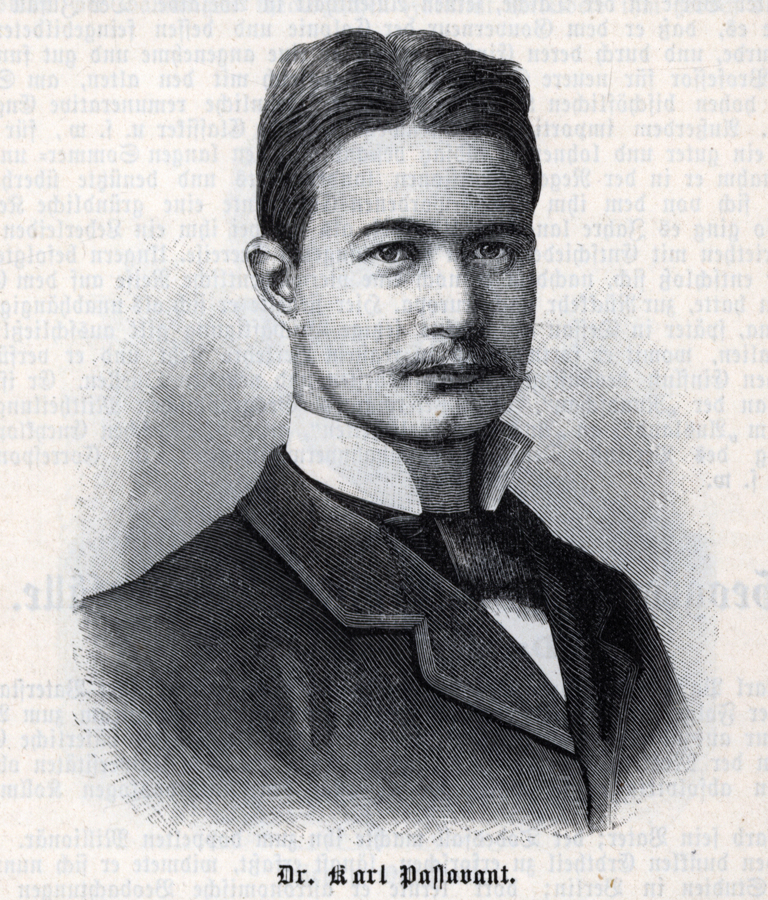
- Born: Carl Passavant; 14 May 1854; Basel, Switzerland
- Died: 22 September 1887 (aged 33); Honolulu, Hawaiian Kingdom (now Honolulu, Hawaii, U.S.)
- Other name: Carl von Passavant
- Occupations: Explorer, medical doctor, anthropologist
- Known for: Research on West Africa
- Relatives: Johann Jakob Bachofen (maternal uncle)

Carl Passavant (14 May 1854 – 22 September 1887) was a Swiss explorer, medical doctor and anthropologist who was primarily known for his research and photography in West Africa.

== Early life and education ==
Passavant was born 14 May 1854 in Basel, Switzerland, the fourth of six children, to Emanuel Passavant (1817–1879), a banker, and partner of Passavant & Cie. (an original predecessor to UBS), and Adèle Passavant (née Bachofen; 1823–1883), into an affluent Protestant family of the Daig.

He completed his schooling in Basel and studied natural science at University of Basel from 1871 to 1873, followed by architecture at Zurich Polytechnic Institute briefly from 1873 to 1874 and ultimately medicine at the University of Basel and the University of Tübingen. He graduated as Doctor of Medicine under Julius Kollmann.

== Career ==
Initially, between 1881 and 1882 Passavant resided in Berlin, where he prepared himself for his first exploration trip. After the death of his father and receiving a not insignificant inheritance, he was able to finance his first expedition.

On 12 January 1883, Passavant and Wilhelm Retzer (1856–1883), a colleague and zoologist, boarded the steamship Aline Woermann, which took them to Western Africa. They arrived in the coastal area of Cameroon near Douala on 11 March 1883. Retzer died two months into the expedition, after which Passavant returned to Basel.

== Personal life ==
Passavant was unmarried and had no children.

He died on 22 September 1887 in Honolulu, Hawaiian Kingdom, aged 33.
