= Privatier =

Wealthy person

A privatier (German pronunciation: [pʁivaˈtjeː]) also known as independently wealthy is someone who does not have to work to make a living, and who lives off assets of some size, e.g. interest, profits from investments, real estate, and current assets.

Sometimes, the title is used by affluent businessmen after they have wholly or largely retired from their former activity. For example, in Thomas Mann's 1901 novel Buddenbrooks, the character Alois Permaneder, a former merchant, uses this title after his marriage to Tony Buddenbrook after receiving a substantial dowry from her wealthy family, at which point he retires from business.
