= Ventana Medical Systems =

American medical device company

Ventana Medical Systems, Inc.
- Company type: Subsidiary
- Traded as: Nasdaq: VMSI
- Industry: Medical
- Founded: 1985; 41 years ago
- Founder: Thomas Grogan, M.D.
- Headquarters: Oro Valley, Arizona, U.S.
- Area served: Worldwide
- Products: Medical equipment Assay development
- Services: Clinical laboratory
- Number of employees: 1,500
- Parent: F. Hoffmann-La Roche Ltd.
- Divisions: Roche Diagnostics
- Website: ventana.com

Ventana Medical Systems, Inc. was a medical device company that develops, manufactures, and markets instrument reagent systems that automate tissue and slide staining in anatomic pathology laboratories. These products assist in the diagnosis and treatment of cancer and infectious diseases.

The company is now part of the Roche Diagnostics Division and has been renamed Roche Tissue Diagnostics.

== History ==
Pathologist and University of Arizona professor Thomas Grogan, M.D., founded Ventana in 1985. The company launched its first instrument reagent system in 1991, and held an initial public offering (IPO) in 1996, trading under the symbol VMSI on the NASDAQ stock exchange.

In 2007, Ventana acquired Spring BioScience Corp, a developer and supplier of monoclonal antibodies. That same year, Ventana rejected a hostile takeover bid from Roche Holding AG for $75 a share. In February 2008, Roche acquired Ventana with a cash offer of $89.50 per share ($3.4 billion).

== Key people ==
- Thomas Grogan, M.D., Founder, Ventana Medical Systems, Inc.
- Laura Apitz, President, Ventana Medical Systems, Inc., Head, Roche Tissue Diagnostics

== Products ==
Ventana manufactures products within eight areas:

- Immunohistochemistry (IHC)
- in situ hybridization (ISH)
- Hematoxylin and eosin (H&E)
- Special stains
- Personalized medicine
- Digital pathology
- Workflow
- Image analysis
