= Emanuel Hoffmann =

Swiss entrepreneur (1896-1932)

Emanuel Hoffmann (4 May 1896 – 3 October 1932) was a Swiss jurist and art collector. He was the son of Fritz Hoffmann-La Roche, a founder of the pharmaceutical company Hoffmann-La Roche (also known as Roche), and his first wife.

== Biography ==
He attended the humanist gymnasium in Basel, Switzerland, and studied law at the Universities of Basel and Bern.

In 1921 he married Maja Stehlin. From that year he worked at the family's company Roche in Basel. Between 1925 and 1930 he was in charge of the company's branch in Brussels, Belgium.

In Belgium, he and his wife began to collect art from such contemporary painters as Joan Miró, Pablo Picasso, Paul Klee and Max Ernst.

In 1930 they returned to Basel, where from 1932 onwards Hoffman was a vice-director at the headquarters of Roche in Basel. In 1932 he was elected the president of the Art Association of Basel.

The same year, he died in a car accident.

== Personal life ==
After getting divorced, in 1921 he married Maja Stehlin. They had two sons and a daughter together. His son Lukas Hoffmann was best known for being a co-founder of the World Wide Fund for Nature.

== Legacy ==
After his death, his surviving wife, Maja Hoffmann, established the Emanuel Hoffmann Foundation which continues what was important to her late husband.
