= Maja Sacher =

Swiss art collector (1896-1989)

Maja Sacher (7 August 1896 – 8 August 1989) was a Swiss art collector and philanthropist.

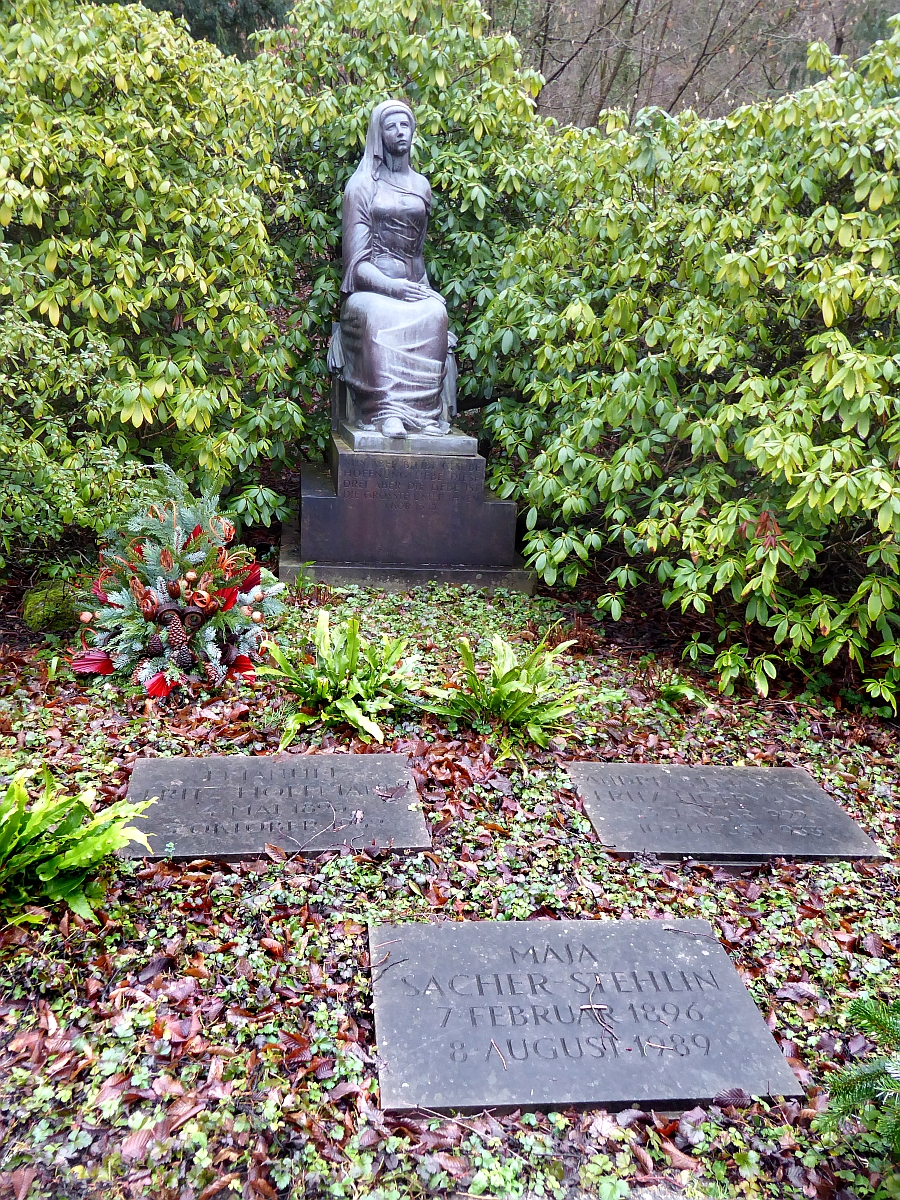
Tomb of Maja Sacher

== Early life and education ==
She was born in 1896 to the architect Fritz Stehlin and Helene von Bavier. She studied sculpture in Munich and was taught by Antoine Bourdelle in Paris. In 1921 she married Emanuel Hoffmann, with whom she first lived in Paris and from 1925 in Brussels. In Paris, but also in Brussels, the two became part of the artistic community and bought paintings from Max Ernst, Paul Klee and Marc Chagall amongst others. In 1930 the family moved to Basel where Emanuel Hoffmann became the vice director of the family owned Hoffmann-La Roche. In Basel, the two became influential figures of the local cultural life. Her husband Emanuel died in 1932 in a serious car accident following which Maja Hoffmann founded the Emanuel Hoffmann Foundation in 1933. The Foundation was established to support the contemporary arts and their artists.

== Philanthropy ==
She married the conductor Paul Sacher in 1934 with whom she kept on expanding the art collection. In 1936 they moved to a house she designed herself in the countryside of Pratteln. She acted as president of the foundation and was the first woman member of the art commission of the Kunstmuseum in Basel between 1940 and 1964. In 1941 she donated the collection of the Emanuel Hoffmann Foundation to the Kunstmuseum Basel as a permanent deposit. Together with Paul Sacher, she expanded the collection with works of Joseph Beuys, Mark Rothko, Alberto Ciacometti and Alexander Calder. In 1980 she donated the at the time first Museum for contemporary art, which is today a part of the Kunstmuseum in Basel.
