= LUMA Foundation =

Swiss nonprofit organization

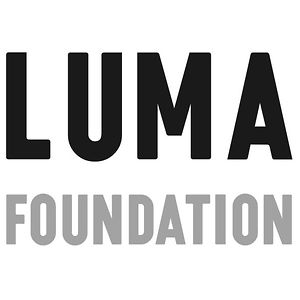

LUMA Foundation is a nonprofit organization established in 2004 that is based out of Zurich, Switzerland. It supports the activities of independent contemporary artists and other pioneers working in the fields of art, photography, publishing, documentary, and multimedia.

== History ==
Established by Maja Hoffmann, the foundation promotes artistic projects combining a particular interest in environmental issues, human rights, education.

== LUMA Arles ==
=== Program ===
LUMA Arles, which launched formally in 2013, is dedicated to providing artists with opportunities to experiment in the production of new work through interdisciplinary collaboration. The conceptualisation of its mission, and the initial programming, has been spearheaded by Maja Hoffmann.

=== Architecture ===
Sitting just outside Arles's Roman city walls, the centrepiece of the 27-acre LUMA Arles campus is the 15,000 sq ft (1,400 m^{2}) Arts Resource Centre building designed by Frank Gehry. It houses research and reference facilities, workshop and seminar rooms, and artist studios and presentation spaces. Gehry's initial design for two metallic towers met with considerable opposition and was subsequently rejected by France's National Commission of Historical Monuments, on the grounds that the buildings would obscure views of the Alyscamps. In 2013, a second design in a different position on the north of the site—a single twisting tower with 13 levels and 11,000 reflective stainless-steel plates—was approved.

LUMA Arles also encompasses six historic, large-scale industrial buildings. One historic building, the Grande Halle, was renovated in 2007 by the initiative of the Provence-Alpes-Côte d'Azur region. Four other large-scale industrial buildings on the Luma Arles site, previously a manufacture and repair yard for the French national railway system, were refurbished by Annabelle Selldorf and are used for installations and artists' residencies.
