= Daig (Switzerland) =

Milieu of wealthy families in Basel

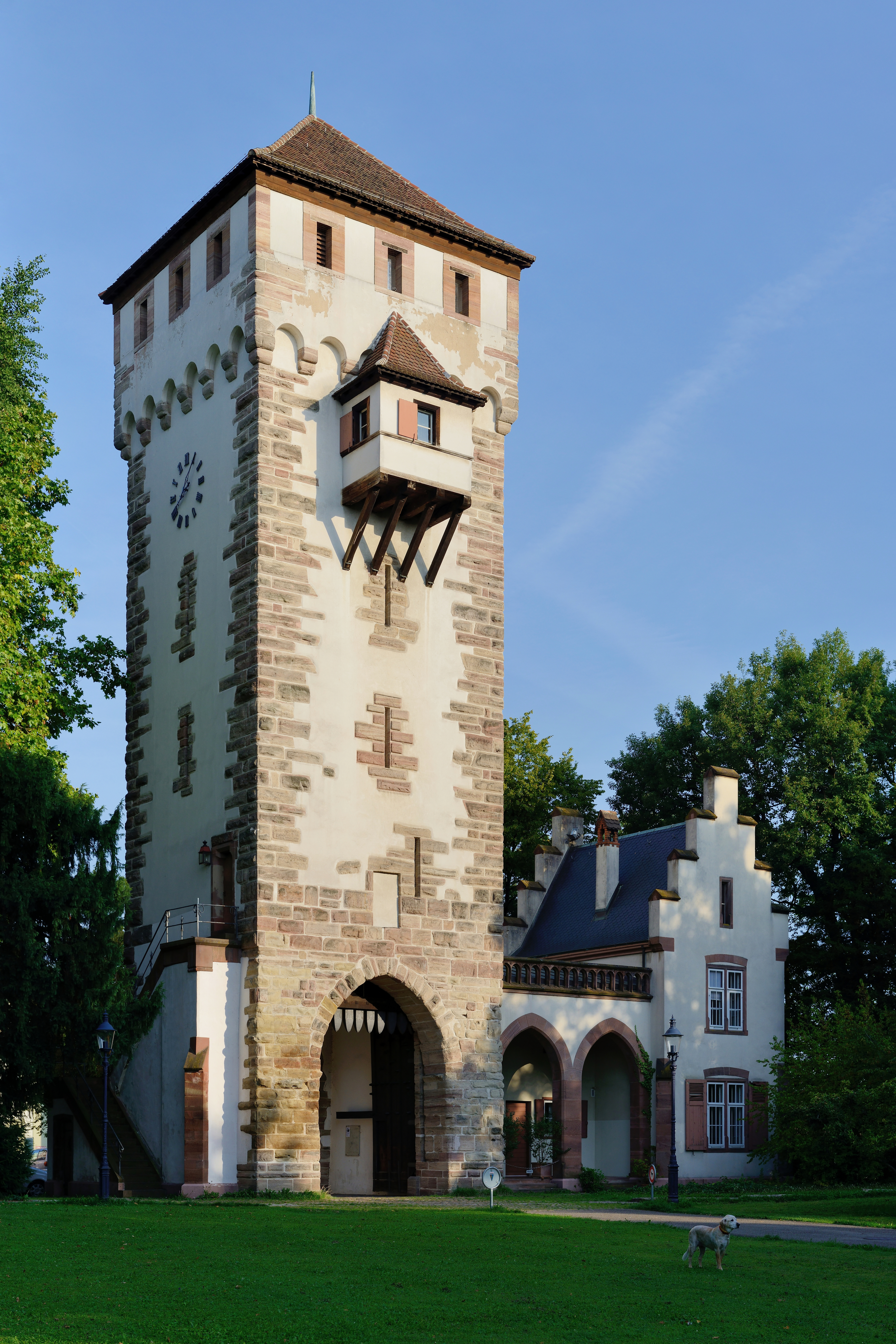
St. Alban Gate is one of the few remaining parts of the medieval city wall of Basel. The reclusive St. Alban residential area has been home to the Daig families since the beginning of the 16th century.

The Daig (/daɪɡ/) is the milieu of wealthy families from the city of Basel.

These primarily Protestant families had full civic rights in the then city-state since the High Middle Ages and are known for their idiosyncratic habits and a dialect distinct from that of the rest of the population.

For centuries the Daig was the social, political and economic elite of Basel, and at times constutited its aristocracy, but always remained legally part of the citizenry.

== History ==
=== Historical background ===
While Daig literally means 'dough' in Swiss German, it is most likely that the name is derived from the Middle High German word deig, a term denoting a moat in front of a rampart. This is further supported by the similarity to the Greek τεĩχος ('wall') or the word Deich, which has come to signify 'dike' in contemporary German. During the early Middle Ages, the social standing of inhabitants was reflected by whether they lived on the lower levels of the city in the vicinity of the Rhine, or on the slopes of either the 'Münsterhügel' (cathedral hill) or the 'Spalenberg' hill. Living on a hillside not only conveyed the family's high social standing, the hillsides were also the only parts of the city that provided inhabitants with a constant supply of fresh water, which was routed there at the time from springs higher up on the hill via primitive wooden aqueducts.

While the 'Münsterhügel' was home to clerics and the seat of the prince-bishop, the 'Spalenberg' was inhabited by knights and other nobility, tasked with defending the city. While the location of the knight's quarters was in line with the overall social topography of the city at the time, the primary reasons for the location was undoubtedly a strategic one, as it was in the direct vicinity of the 11th-century city walls, nowadays known as 'Burckhardtsche Stadtmauer'. With the city's knights and their liegemen living right next to the city's defenses, they were able to man the ramparts within minutes in the case of an unexpected attack on the city. Thus the term 'Daig' when used to refer to the city's noblemen literally meant 'those that live at and man the city walls.'

Since the late Middle Ages the Bürgerschaft commoners who enjoyed civic rights, most of whom were artisans and members of one of the city's powerful guilds, had successively acquired most regalia from Basel's official ruler, the Prince-Bishop of Basel, such as the Münzregal, the right to impose tariffs, and eventually even the right to low jurisdiction, which allowed the commoners to institute their own courts except for such crimes that were punishable by death; only they had to be decided by a court of so-called high justice (see Blutgerichtsbarkeit).

With the prince-bishop bereft of most of his customary privileges and powers, Basel became de facto independent and was ruled by a city council dominated by the city's ever powerful guilds. However, it was not until 1500 that the townsmen were finally able to get rid of their feudal ruler, forcing him to move his residence out of Basel, which enabled the city to join the Eidgenossenschaft as its 11th canton. The canton then encompassed not merely the city but significant territory in its vicinity that had been acquired, and Basel was still a feudal bishopric. The former residences of knights and other noblemen that had left with the Prince-Bishop were largely acquired by wealthy families, in some cases noble themselves, that over time became a quasi city aristocracy. Along with the estates of the noblemen, these families also inherited the name Daig that eventually came to be associated with these new inhabitants.

=== Early 19th century ===
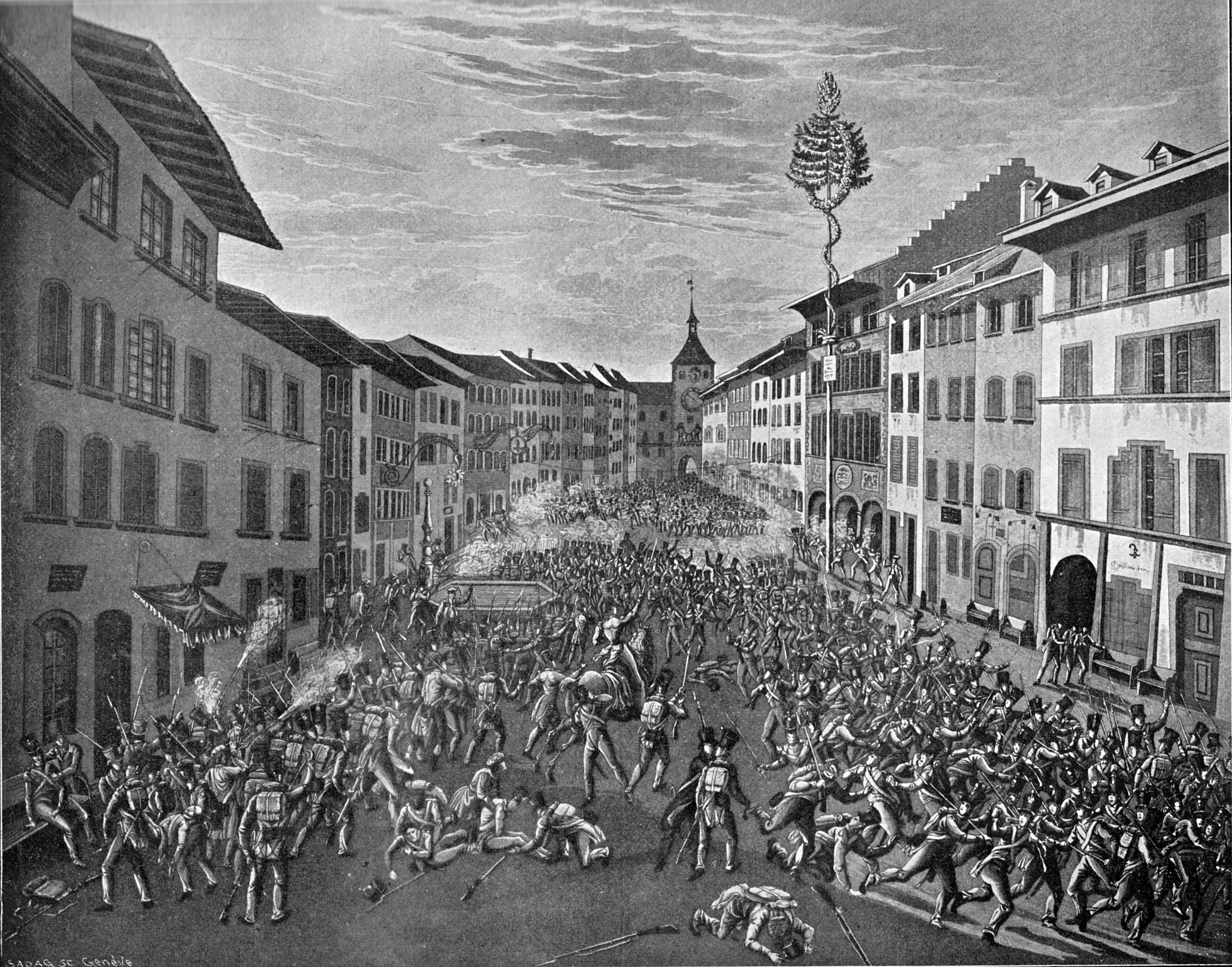
City troops fighting 'Baselbieter' troops in the streets of Liestal in the 1830s

While citizens from both the city and the surrounding municipalities of the countryside were represented in the 'Grand Council,' i.e. the cantonal parliament, the latter was dominated by the city, despite having a smaller population than the combined municipalities of the countryside. At the turn of the 19th century this caused growing discontent among the 'Baselbieter' (the citizens of the surrounding municipalities), escalating into armed conflict between Basel and the 'Baselbiet' in 1830. After initial victories for the city it was eventually defeated in 1833.

The medieval Tagsatzung, at the time still the highest national authority in Switzerland (and the only one), mandated a separation of the canton, with the city merely retaining the municipalities of Riehen, Bettingen and Kleinhüningen, which would have otherwise become enclaves surrounded by the city of Basel. These developments caused great resentment in Basel, especially among Basel's ruling elite, which fostered antipathy towards all citizens of the newly-formed canton of Basel-Landschaft as well as 'outsiders' in general. Over time, that sentiment contributed in shaping the distinct mentality characteristic of the Daig milieu.

=== Late 19th and early 20th century ===
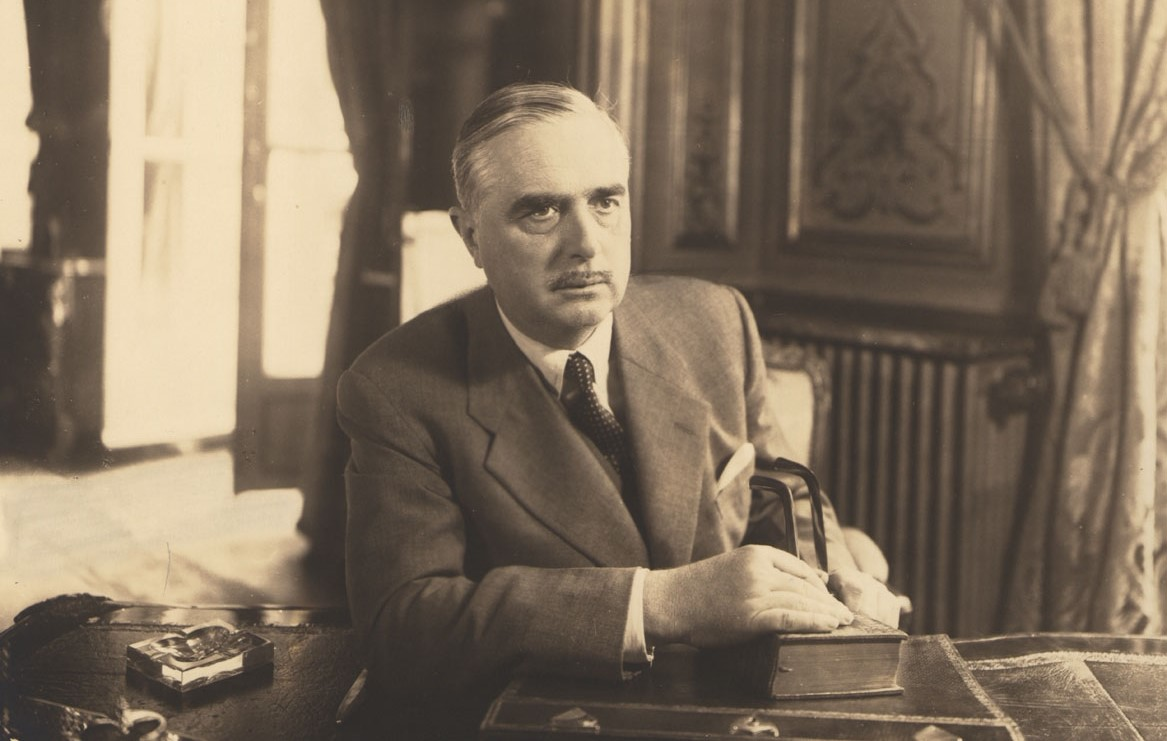
The gentleman diplomat Carl J. Burckhardt at the Hôtel de Besenval

As the Daig dynasties had accumulated much of their wealth in private banking and silk manufacture, the increasing significance of pharmaceutical and chemical industry for Basel challenged their quasi-hegemonial position, especially since said industries had been built up largely by individuals that not only were not part of the Daig, but often had moved to Basel only recently.

Furthered by the introduction of stock corporations, that diminished significantly the influence exerted by the Daig. Nonetheless, seats in the Grand Council of Basel-Stadt as well as other important positions in both public service and industry are still routinely held by individuals with family names indicative of Daig affiliation, such as Vischer, Sarasin, Burckhardt or Merian.

== 'Der feine Unterschied' - subtle distinctions ==
=== The Daig sociolect ===
One of the defining characteristics of the Daig milieu is its perceived need to separate itself from those not part of that milieu. This separation is intended to distance Basel's aristocracy both vertically from the middle classes and horizontally from the so-called 'newly rich.' One of the primary means to uphold the distinction between the Daig and outsiders is the use of the Daig sociolect, commonly referred to as Baaseldytsch, in contrast to the common speech known as Baseldütsch. Both names already indicate certain underlying differences in pronunciation. It is notable that the common Baseldütsch and the Daig Baaseldytsch make up two varieties of the same Low Alemannic form of German, but Baaseldytsch has accrued fewer affinities with the High Alemannic dialects that dominate most of German-speaking Switzerland.

=== Distinctions in daily life ===
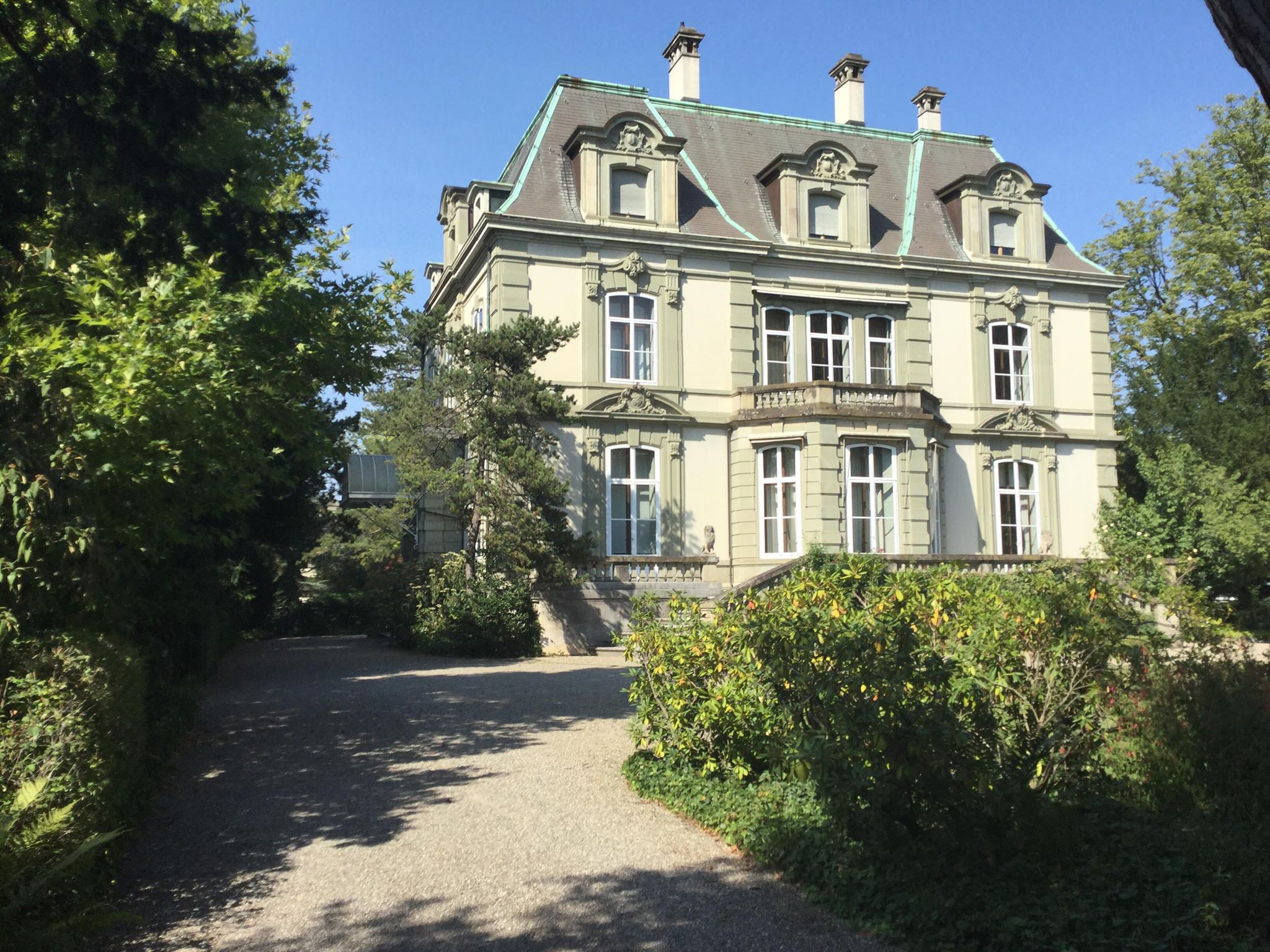
Urban mansion (early 20th century)

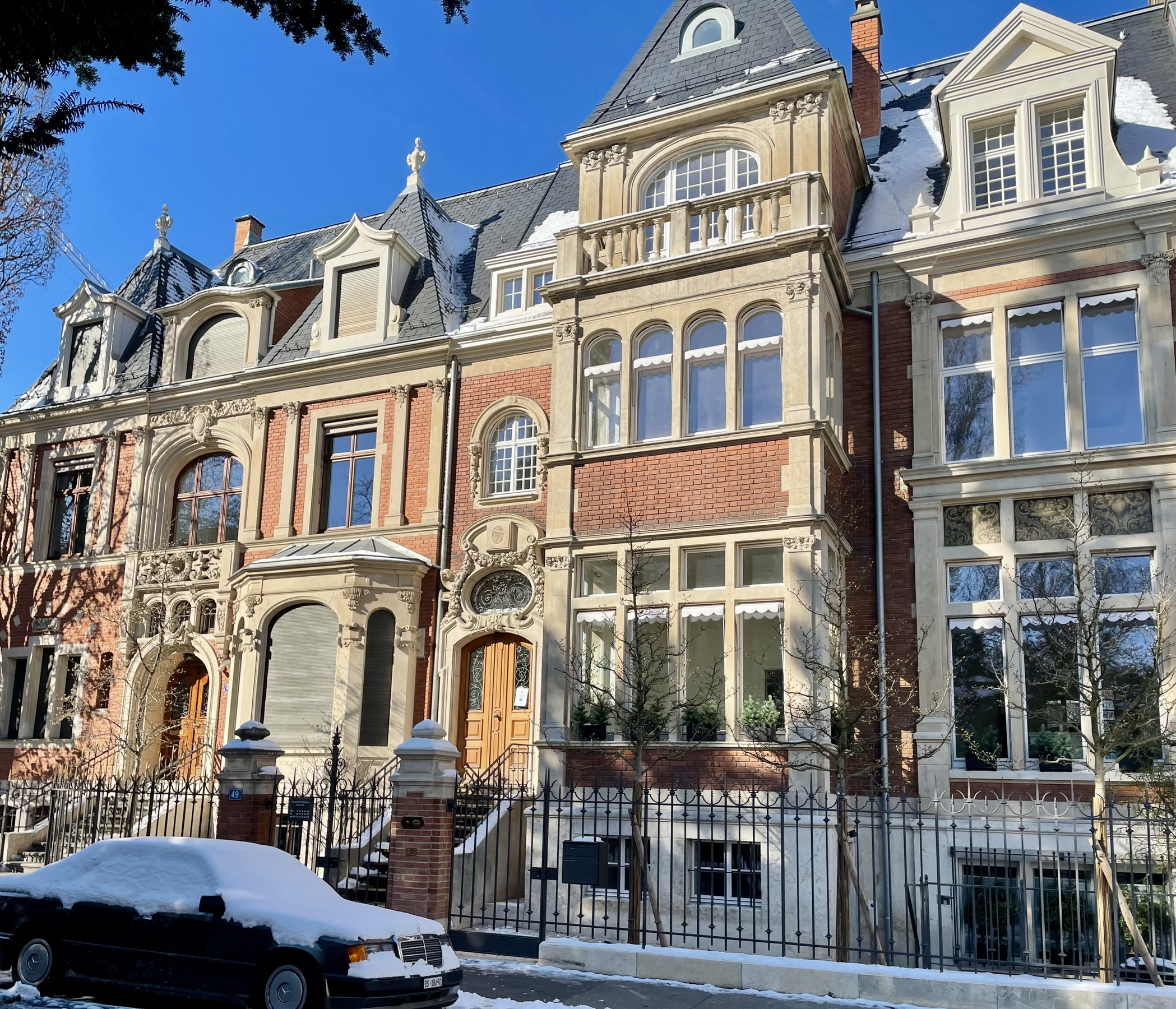
Townhouses (early 20th century)

In daily life, the Daig's disposition to distinguish itself from any kind of 'outsiders' results in numerous instances of what is called "der feine Unterschied", roughly translated as 'the subtle distinction.' This concerns the kind of shops and restaurants frequented, whom one associates with, apparel and leisure time activities, most of which are rather unobtrusive, as the open display of wealth is frowned upon among Daig families. One well known trait of the Daig is to have their mailboxes labelled merely with initials, the implicit message being: 'If you are ignorant as to who resides here, you would not be welcome anyway.'

=== Dynastic marriages ===
While it is expected for male members of the Daig to find a suitable partner within the milieu, young women traditionally enjoy more liberties in choosing a spouse and often bridge the gap to the 'nouveau riches,' thus ensuring that all influential families are at least somewhat affiliated with the Daig.

=== Political affiliations ===
Politically, the Daig families found their political home in the Konservative Partei, renamed Liberale Partei in 1902 and known today as Liberal-Demokratische Partei. It strongly dominated the canton until the constitutional reform of 1875 lead to the emergence of the Freisinn as the dominant political power. Despite this relative loss of influence, the LDP to this day remains actively involved in shaping local politics.

== In popular culture ==
In early Swiss films, most of which were produced in Zürich, it was for many years a common stylistic device to have the 'villain' speak Basel German, usually of the Daig variety and with a high, nasal voice. This choice is often seen in the depiction of villains of high social standing or intelligence. The motive is apparent early on, for example in the 1935 Swiss dialect film Jä-soo!, in the film adaption of the Gotthelf novel Uli the Farmhand and in the popular Swiss movie 'Bäckerei Zürrer.'
