= Roche =

Swiss multinational healthcare company

Coordinates: 47.558624°N 7.606018°E

Roche Holding AG

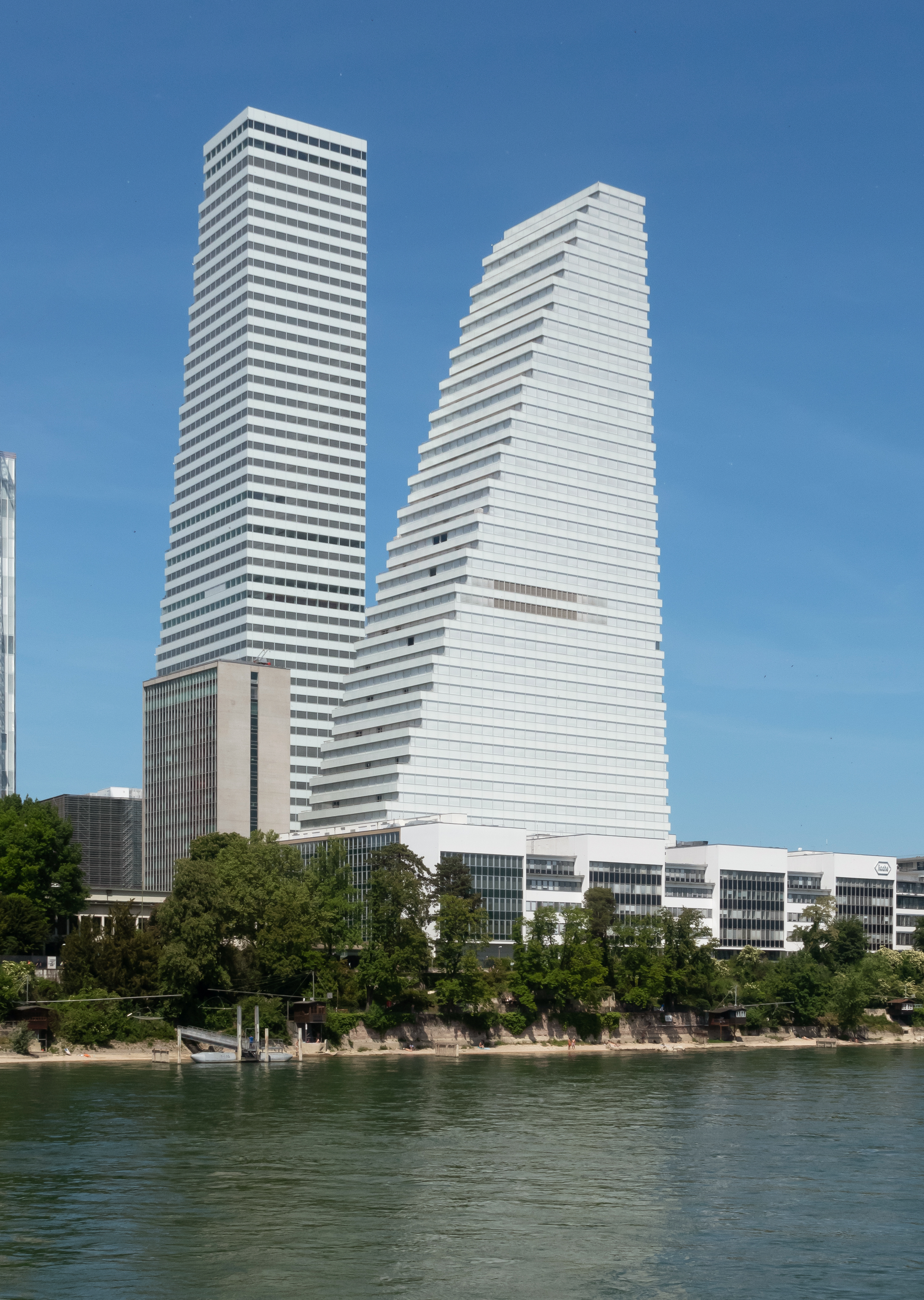
- Roche Tower and Roche Tower 2, headquarters of Hoffmann-La Roche in Basel (2022)
- Type: Public
- Traded as: SIX: RO (voting); SIX: ROG (non-voting); SMI component
- ISIN: CH0012032048
- Industry: Pharmaceuticals
- Predecessor: Hoffmann, Traub & Co. (1894)
- Founded: 1 October 1896; 130 years ago
- Founder: Fritz Hoffmann-La Roche
- Headquarters: Basel, Switzerland
- Area served: Worldwide
- Key people: Severin Schwan (chairman); André Hoffmann (vice-chairman); Thomas Schinecker (CEO); Levi Garraway (CMO)
- Products: Pharmaceuticals and diagnostics (List of products)
- Revenue: ▲CHF 62.39 billion (2024)
- Operating income: ▼CHF 13.42 billion (2024)
- Net income: ▼CHF 9.19 billion (2024)
- Total assets: ▲CHF 101.80 billion (2024)
- Total equity: ▲CHF 36.16 billion (2024)
- Number of employees: ▼103,249 (2024)
- Subsidiaries: Genentech; Ventana
- Website: www.roche.com
- Footnotes: Financials as of as of 31 December 2024

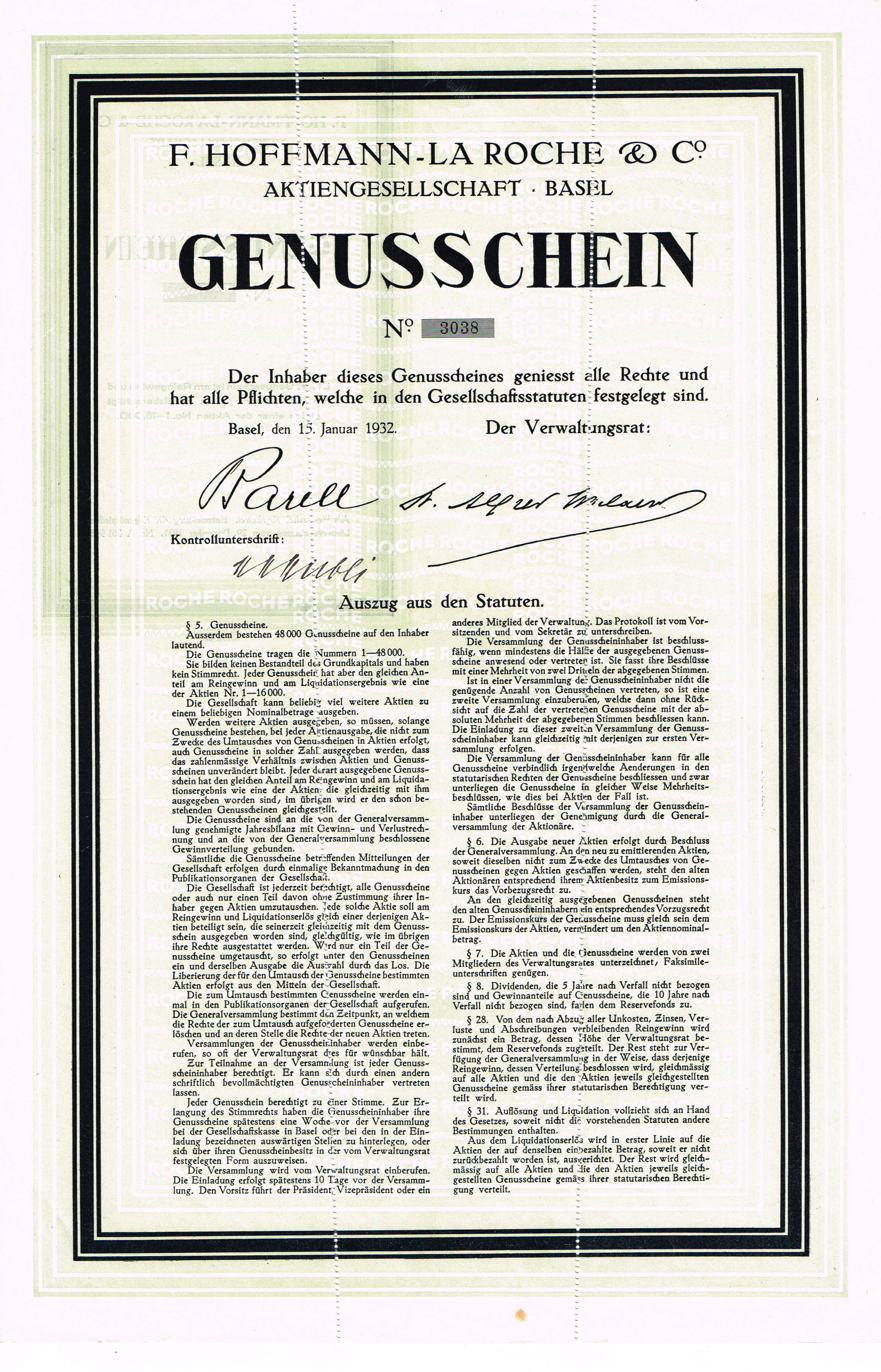
Participation certificate of the F. Hoffmann-LaRoche & Co AG, issued 15 January 1932

F. Hoffmann-La Roche AG, commonly known as Roche (/roʊʃ/), is a Swiss multinational holding healthcare company that operates worldwide under two divisions: Pharmaceuticals and Diagnostics. Its holding company, Roche Holding AG, has shares listed on the SIX Swiss Exchange. The company headquarters are located in Basel. Roche is the fifth-largest pharmaceutical company in the world by revenue and the leading provider of cancer treatments globally. In 2023, the company’s seat in the Forbes Global 2000 was 76.

The company owns the American biotechnology company Genentech, which is a wholly owned independent subsidiary, and the Japanese biotechnology company Chugai Pharmaceuticals, as well as the United States–based companies Ventana and Foundation Medicine. Roche's revenues during fiscal year 2020, were 58.32 billion Swiss francs. Descendants of the founding Hoffmann and Oeri families own slightly over half of the bearer shares with voting rights (a pool of family shareholders 45%, and Maja Oeri a further 5% apart), with Swiss pharma firm Novartis owning a further third of its shares until 2021.

F. Hoffmann-La Roche is a full member of the European Federation of Pharmaceutical Industries and Associations.

== History ==
Roche logo (1967–2021)

Founded in 1896 by Fritz Hoffmann-La Roche, the company was known early on for producing various vitamin preparations and derivatives. In 1934, it became the first company to mass-produce synthetic vitamin C, under the brand name Redoxon. During the Second World War, Roche collaborated with the Nazi regime in Germany and used forced labour in its German and Polish-based factories. It also moved all its Jewish employees to the United States to save them from Nazi attention.

In 1957, Hoffmann-La Roche introduced the class of tranquilizers known as benzodiazepines (with Valium and Rohypnol being the best known members). It manufactures and sells several cancer drugs and is a leader in this field. In 1956, the first antidepressant, iproniazid, was accidentally created during an experiment while synthesizing isoniazid. Originally, it had been intended to create a more efficient drug at combatting tuberculosis. Iproniazid, however, was revealed to have its own benefits; some people felt it made them feel happier. It was withdrawn from the market in the early 1960s due to toxic side-effects.

In 1976, an accident at a chemical factory in Seveso, Italy, owned by a subsidiary of Roche, caused a large dioxin contamination. In 1982, the United States arm of the company acquired Biomedical Reference Laboratories for US$163.5 million. That company dated from the late 1960s, and was located in Burlington, North Carolina. That year Hoffmann-La Roche then merged it with all of its laboratories, and incorporated the merged company as Roche Biomedical Laboratories, Inc. in Burlington. By the early 1990s, Roche Biomedical became one of the largest clinical laboratory networks in the United States, with 20 major laboratories and US$600 million in sales.

Roche has also produced various HIV tests and antiretroviral drugs. It bought the patents for the polymerase chain reaction (PCR) technique in 1992. In 1995, the era of highly active anti-retroviral therapy (HAART) was initiated by the United States FDA's approval of Hoffman LaRoche's HIV protease inhibitor, saquinavir. Within 2 years of its approval (and that of ritonavir 4 months later) annual deaths from AIDS in the United States fell from over 50,000 to approximately 18,000. On 28 April 1995, Hoffmann-La Roche sold Roche Biomedical Laboratories, Inc. to National Health Laboratories Holdings Inc. (which then changed its name to Laboratory Corporation of America Holdings). Roche acquired Syntex in 1994, and Chugai Pharmaceuticals in 2002.

In 1998, Roche acquired Corange Ltd, the parent company of Boehringer Mannheim and DePuy Manufacturing for $11 billion. Boehringer Mannheim would be rebranded as Roche Diagnostics and DePuy was sold to Johnson & Johnson.

Roche is the only drug company authorized to manufacture the drug oseltamivir, an antiviral drug used to combat influenza, which was discovered by Gilead Sciences. Roche purchased the rights to the drug in 1996, and in 2005, settled a royalty dispute, agreeing to pay Gilead tiered royalties of 14–22% of annual net sales without adjusting the payments for manufacturing costs, as had been allowed in the original licensing agreement.

On 20 October 2005, Hoffmann-La Roche decided to license other companies to manufacture Oseltamivir.

Also in 2005, Roche acquired the Swiss company GlycArt Biotechnology in order to acquire technology to afucosylate antibodies; one of its products in development was obinutuzumab, which gained FDA approval in November 2013 for the treatment of chronic lymphocytic leukemia.

On 22 January 2008, Roche acquired Ventana Medical Systems for $3.4 billion. On 2 January 2009, Roche acquired Memory Pharmaceuticals Corp.

On 26 March 2009, Roche acquired Genentech for $46.8 billion. On 12 March 2009, Roche agreed to fully acquire Genentech, in which it had held a majority stake since 1990, after eight months of negotiations. As a result of the Genentech acquisition, Roche moved its Palo Alto–based research facilities to its campus that straddles the border between Clifton, New Jersey and Nutley, New Jersey while Roche's United States headquarters, located on the New Jersey site since 1929, was moved to Genentech's facility in South San Francisco. Genentech became a wholly owned subsidiary group of Roche on 25 March 2009. Roche began vacating the NJ site in 2012, and sold it off in 2016.

Roche acquired Medingo Ltd. in April 2010, for $160 million and BioImagene, Inc. in August for $100 million.

In 2011, the company received the International Society for Pharmaceutical Engineering Facility of the Year Award for Process Innovation for Roche's "MyDose" Clinical Supply project. In March 2011, Roche acquired PVT Probenverteiltechnik GmbH for up to €85 million. In July 2010, Roche acquired mtm laboratories AG for up to 190 million EUR. In October, Roche acquired Anadys Pharmaceuticals, Inc. for $230 million. In December, Roche announced it would acquire Munich-based Verum Diagnostica GmbH, gaining entry to the fastest-growing field in the coagulation diagnostics market.

On 26 June 2012, Roche announced the closure of the Nutley/Clifton campus, which was completed in 2013. The property is in the process of remediation.

In July 2013, Roche Diagnostics acquired blood diagnostics company Constitution Medical Inc. for $220 million. Later, in September, Genentech announced it would acquire Arrayit Corporation.

On 7 April 2014, Roche announced its intention to acquire IQuum for up to $450 million, as well as the rights to an experimental drug (ORY-1001) from Spanish company Oryzon Genomics for $21 million and up to $500 million in milestone payments. On 2 June, Roche announced its intention to acquire Genia Technologies Inc. for up to $350 million. In August 2014, the company agreed to purchase Californian-based pharmaceutical firm InterMune for $8.3 billion, at $74 a share this represents a 38% premium over the final share closing price, as well as Santaris Pharma A/S for $450 million. In December 2014, the company acquired next-generation sequencing processing company Bina Technologies for an undisclosed sum and Dutalys GmbH a developer of next-generation anti-bodies.

On 16 January 2015, the company announced that they would acquire Trophos for €470 million ($543 million) in order to increase the company's neuromuscular disease presence. The deal will centre on the Phase II and III spinal muscular atrophy drug olesoxime (TRO19622). In April 2015, Roche acquired CAPP Medical, and its chief development of technology for cancer screening and monitoring via the detection of circulating tumour DNA.

In August, the company announced its intention to acquire GeneWEAVE, Inc. for up to $425 million in order to strengthen its microbial diagnostics business. Days later the company acquired Kapa Biosystems, Inc. for $445M, focussing on next generation sequencing and polymerase chain reaction applications. In October 2015, the company acquired Adheron Therapeutics for $105 million (plus up to $475 million in milestone payments).

In January 2016, the company announced it would acquire Tensha Therapeutics for $115 million upfront, with $420 million in contingent payments.

In January 2017, the company acquired ForSight VISION4. In June, the company acquired the diabetes management platform, mySugr GmbH for an undisclosed price. In November Roche acquired Viewics, Inc. In late December the company announced it would acquire Ignyta Inc, expanding its global oncology business.

In February 2018, Roche announced it would acquire Flatiron Health, a business specialising in US cancer data analytics, for $1.9 billion. In June of the same year the company announced it would acquire the outstanding shares of Foundation Medicine for $2.4 billion ($137 per share). Later in September Roche announced its intention to acquire Tusk Therapeutics for up to €655 million ($759 million) expanding Roche's oncology pipeline. Tusk announced that the anti-CD38 antibody it is developing will be spun off to form a new company, Black Belt Therapeutics. In late November, the company announced that Genentech would acquire Jecure Therapeutics, gaining access to Jecure's portfolio of NLRP3 inhibitors developed to fight inflammatory diseases like non-alcoholic steatohepatitis and liver fibrosis.

In February 2019, the business announced it would acquire gene therapy company, Spark Therapeutics, for US$4.3 billion ($114.50 per share) adding Spark's gene therapy portfolio to its previous acquired assets. Spark has an already approved treatment for Leber's congenital amaurosis, Luxturna – priced at US$850,000 per patient. The offer to acquire Spark Therapeutics was extended to May 2019 after Roche was unable to garner majority support from Spark shareholders. A second gene therapy-related action came in December with the US$1.15 billion acquisition of non-United States rights to an investigational duchenne muscular dystrophy gene therapy developed by Sarepta Therapeutics. In November, Roche acquired Promedior and its lead treatment – PRM-151 – for the treatment of idiopathic pulmonary fibrosis, for $390 million upfront and another $1 billion in milestone payments.

In March 2020, the Roche Diagnostics division reached a significant milestone with the FDA-approval of its high-volume Sars-CoV-2 diagnostic test, capable of analysing 1,400-8,800 samples within 24h on the proprietary Cobas 6800/8800 molecular testing system. In September, the business acquired Ireland-based Inflazome, for €380 million, gaining control of its NLRP3 inflammasome inhibitors.

In March 2021, Roche announced it would acquire GenMark Diagnostics for $1.8 billion. Under the terms of agreement, Genmark diagnostics will become a subsidiary and the principal operations will continue to remain in Carlsbad, California. In September, the company announced it would acquire German biotech group, TIB Molbiol, enhancing its molecular diagnostics operations.

In September 2022, Roche acquired Good Therapeutics at a cost of $250M for its PD1-regulated IL-2 receptor agonist program.

In July 2023, Roche partnered with Alnylam Pharmaceuticals in a deal worth $2.8 billion for the development of a hypertension drug. In December 2023, Roche acquired Carmot Therapeutics, an anti-obesity drug developer, for $2.7 billion.

In October 2023, Monte Rosa Therapeutics and Roche signed a strategic cooperation and licensing agreement for the discovery and development of molecular adhesive degradators (MGD) to combat cancer and neurological diseases. The partnership includes Monte Rosa's QuEENT discovery engine and Roche Holding expertise. Also Monte Rosa will receive $50m as an upfront payment and additional payments that will depend on the pre-clinical, clinical, commercial stages and sales, as well as multi-level royalty system and may exceed $2 billion.

In March 2024, it was announced Roche had sold Genentech's site in Vacaville, California to the Swiss pharmaceutical company, Lonza for $1.2 billion.

In November 2024, Roche acquired Poseida Therapeutics for US $1.0 billion.

In April 2025, Roche announced it would invest $50 billion in the United States over the next five years, creating more than 12,000 new jobs.

In May 2025, Genentech, a Roche subsidiary agreed a partnership worth $2.1 billion with Orionis Biosciences for the development of a small-molecule protein degrader for cancer.

In October 2025, Roche announced the completion of its acquisition, for $3.5 billion, of 89bio, a San-Francisco based company focusing on developing therapies for liver and cardio-metabolic disease.

== Family ==
The Hoffmann-La Roche family is Switzerland's richest and one of the most secretive families. Many members of the family don't carry the last name Hoffmann anymore. Some are known as Oeri, Michalski, Faber-Castell, Fabre, Schmid or Duschmalé.

=== Acquisition history ===
Roche acquisitions
- Hoffmann-La Roche (Founded 1896 by Fritz Hoffmann-La Roche)
  - Biomedical Reference Laboratories (Acq 1982, restructured into Roche Biomedical Laboratories, Inc in 1982, sold 1995)
  - Syntex (Acq 1994)
  - Chugai Pharmaceuticals (Acq 2002)
  - 454 Life Sciences (Acq 2007)
  - Roche Diagnostics (Founded as Boehringer Mannheim, Acq 1998)
    - Spring BioScience Corp (Acq 2007)
    - Ventana Medical Systems (Acq 2009)
    - mySugr GmbH (Acq 2017)
    - Viewics, Inc (Acq 2017)
    - Flatiron Health (Acq 2018)
    - Stratos Genomics (Acq 2020)
  - Memory Pharmaceuticals Corp (Acq 2009)
  - Genentech, Inc. (Acq 2009)
    - Tanox, Inc (Acq 2006)
    - Arrayit Corporation (Acq 2013)
    - Seragon Pharmaceuticals, Inc. (Acq 2014)
    - Jecure Therapeutics (Acq 2018)
  - Medingo Ltd (Acq 2010)
  - BioImagene, Inc. (Acq 2010)
  - PVT Probenverteiltechnik GmbH (Acq 2010)
  - MTM laboratories AG (Acq 2010)
  - Anadys Pharmaceuticals, Inc. (Acq 2010)
  - Verum Diagnostica GmbH (Acq 2011)
  - Constitution Medical Inc. (Acq 2012)
  - IQuum (Acq 2014)
  - Genia Technologies Inc. (Acq 2014)
  - InterMune (Acq 2014)
  - Santaris Pharma A/S (Acq 2014)
  - Bina Technologies, Inc. (Acq 2014)
  - Dutalys GmbH (Acq 2014)
  - Ariosa Diagnostics (Acq 2014)
  - Trophos (Acq 2015)
  - CAPP Medical (Acq 2015)
  - GeneWEAVE BioSciences, Inc. (Acq 2015)
  - Kapa Biosystems, Inc. (Acq 2015)
  - Adheron Therapeutics (Acq 2015)
  - Tensha Therapeutics (Acq 2016)
  - ForSight VISION4 (Acq 2017)
  - Ignyta Inc (Acq 2017)
  - Foundation Medicine, Inc. (Acq 2018)
  - Tusk Therapeutics (Acq 2018)
  - Spark Therapeutics (Acq 2019)
  - Promedior (Acq 2019)
  - Stratos Genomics (Acq 2020)
  - Inflazome (Acq 2020)
  - GenMark Diagnostics (Acq 2021)
  - TIB Molbiol (Acq 2021)
  - Good Therapeutics (Acq 2022)
  - Telavant (Acq 2023)
  - Carmot Therapeutics (Acq 2023)
  - Poseida Therapeutics (Acq 2024)
  - 89bio (Acq 2025)

== Financial data ==
Financial data in CHF billions
Year	2013	2014	2015	2016	2017	2018	2019	2020	2021	2022	2023	2024
Revenue	46.780	47.462	48.145	50.576	53.299	56.846	63.751	58.323	62.801	66.43	60.44	62.39
Net Income	11.164	9.332	8.863	9.576	8.633	10.865	14.108	15.068	14.935	13.53	12.36	9.19
Assets	62.167	75.641	75.763	76.819	76.676	78.517	83.091	86.138	92.317	88.15	90.47	101.80
Employees	85,080	88,509	91,747	94,052	93,734	94,442	97,735	101,238	100,920	103,613	103,605	103,249

== Divisions ==
Roche has two major divisions: Pharmaceuticals and Diagnostics.

Roche Diagnostics manufactures diagnostic equipment and reagents for research and medical diagnostic applications. Internally, it is organised into five major business areas: Roche Applied Science, Roche Professional Diagnostics, Roche Diabetes Care, Roche Molecular Diagnostics and Roche Tissue Diagnostics (Ventana). The main location for Roche Professional Diagnostics is in Rotkreuz, Switzerland. All business areas except Roche Applied Science focus on health care applications, targeting either physicians, hospitals and clinics, or consumers. Applied Science targets research settings in academia and pharmaceutical and biotechnology industries.

== Price-fixing conspiracy ==
Stanley Adams, Roche's World Product Manager in Basel, contacted the European Economic Community in 1973 with evidence that Roche had been breaking antitrust laws, engaging in price fixing and market sharing for vitamins with its competitors. Roche was fined accordingly, but a bungle on the part of the EEC allowed the company to discover that it was Adams who had blown the whistle. He was arrested for unauthorised disclosure — an offence under Swiss law — and imprisoned. His wife, having learnt that he might face decades in jail, committed suicide.

In 1999 the firm pleaded guilty to participation in a worldwide conspiracy to raise and fix prices for vitamins sold in the US and globally. Hoffmann-La Roche paid $500 million in criminal fines to the United States.

== Drug pricing issue and exit in the Swiss market ==
In July 2025, Roche withdrew Lunsumio from the Swiss market following failed price negotiations with the Swiss Federal Office of Public Health (BAG). The drug had been available since February 2023 through a special "Early Access" program that allowed reimbursement before complete clinical data was available. Under this arrangement, Roche initially covered treatment costs until efficacy was demonstrated, after which the remaining therapy could exceed 100,000 Swiss francs.

When Swissmedic extended the temporary authorization in February 2025 due to still-missing complete clinical data from Phase III studies, Roche rejected the previously negotiated pricing model and demanded higher prices. The BAG refused to modify the agreement, citing concerns that exceptions would set a precedent for other pharmaceutical companies and demanding additional efficacy evidence despite the drug showing positive effects in Phase II studies. According to Swissmedic pricing data, a single 60-mg dose (two vials) of Lunsumio costs over 7,000 Swiss francs.

The withdrawal was announced to oncologists on July 1, 2025, affecting approximately 24 patients annually who suffer from follicular lymphoma—a slowly progressing cancer of the lymph nodes with about 500 new cases per year in Switzerland. Roche also refused to provide individual case reimbursements—a standard Swiss mechanism for exceptional medical situations. Instead, the company offered to provide the medication free through its patient access program for hardship cases, though this option was described as much more restrictive.

Oncologists criticized the decision as unprecedented, with Dr. Carmen de Ramon Ortiz of Geneva University Hospital noting that about 20% of follicular lymphoma patients require intensive treatment and that Lunsumio represents "a very innovative immunotherapy that stimulates the immune system, leading to high remission rates." Industry experts characterized the withdrawal as a form of healthcare rationing and a "canary in the coal mine," noting that only half of EU-approved medications are available in Switzerland. Some experts suggested the withdrawal reflected broader pressures from potential U.S. pricing reforms and trade uncertainties that could affect Roche's largest market, including potential tariff increases on pharmaceutical exports from 10% to up to 31%.

The case was viewed by analysts as a potential precedent-setting "regulatory showdown" that could influence pharmaceutical pricing negotiations across the industry, particularly for rare disease treatments affecting small patient populations.

== Controversies ==
During the Second World War, Roche was reported to have collaborated with the Nazi regime in Germany and used prisoners-of-war or foreign forced labour in its German and Polish-based factories.

In 2008 the Association of the British Pharmaceutical Industry (ABPI) suspended Roche for six months for breaching their code of conduct.

In 2013, Roche had to pay back SFr 3.2 billion to the Swiss tax authorities due to transfer mispricing.

== Collaborative research ==
In addition to internal research and development activities F. Hoffmann-La Roche is also involved in publicly funded collaborative research projects, with other industrial and academic partners. One example in the area of non-clinical safety assessment is the InnoMed PredTox. The company is expanding its activities in joint research projects within the framework of the Innovative Medicines Initiative of the European Federation of Pharmaceutical Industries and Associations and the European Commission.

== See also ==
- List of pharmaceutical companies
- Pharmaceutical industry in Switzerland
