= Obélisque d'Arles =

Arles Obelisk
- Obélisque d'Arles (French)
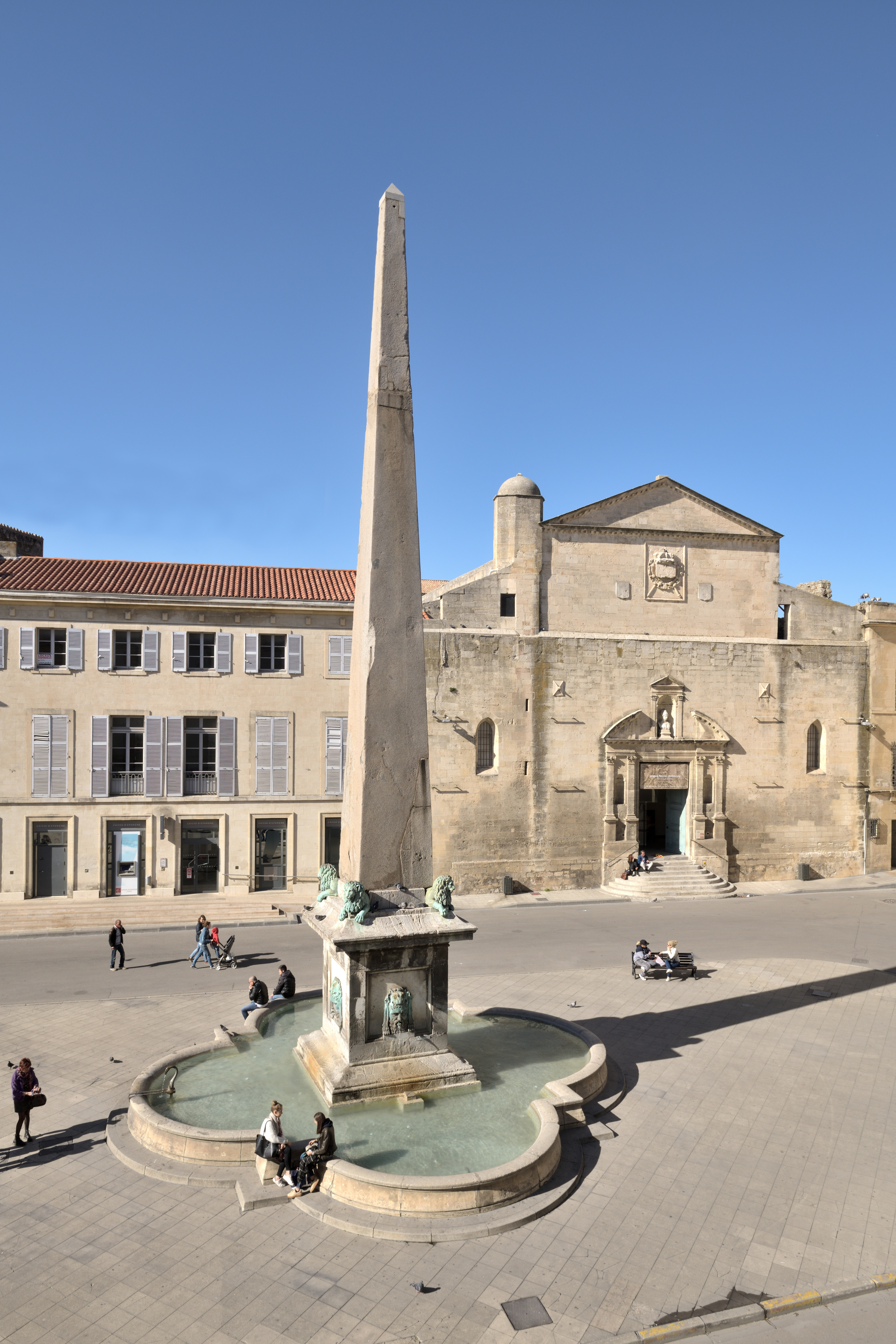
- The Arles Obelisk

- Location within France
- 43.67636°N 4.627594°E
- Location: Place de la République; 13200 Arles, France

History
- Built: 4th century
- Rebuilt: March 26, 1676

Site notes
- Height: 15.26 metres (50.1 ft); With pedestal: 19.81 metres (65.0 ft)
- Architect: Jacques Peytret

UNESCO World Heritage Site
- Type: Cultural
- Criteria: ii, iv
- Designated: 1981 (5th session)
- Part of: Arles, Roman and Romanesque Monuments
- Reference no.: 164
- Region: Europe and North America

Monument historique
- Official name: Obélisque antique
- Designated: 1840
- Reference no.: PA00081180

The Obélisque d'Arles ("Arles Obelisk"; Occitan: Obelisc d'Arle) is a 4th-century Roman obelisk, erected in the center of the Place de la République, in front of the Hôtel de Ville (town hall) in Arles, France.

== Description ==
The obelisk is made of granite from Asia Minor. It does not feature any inscription. Its height together with its pedestal is approximately 15 metres (49 ft).

== History ==
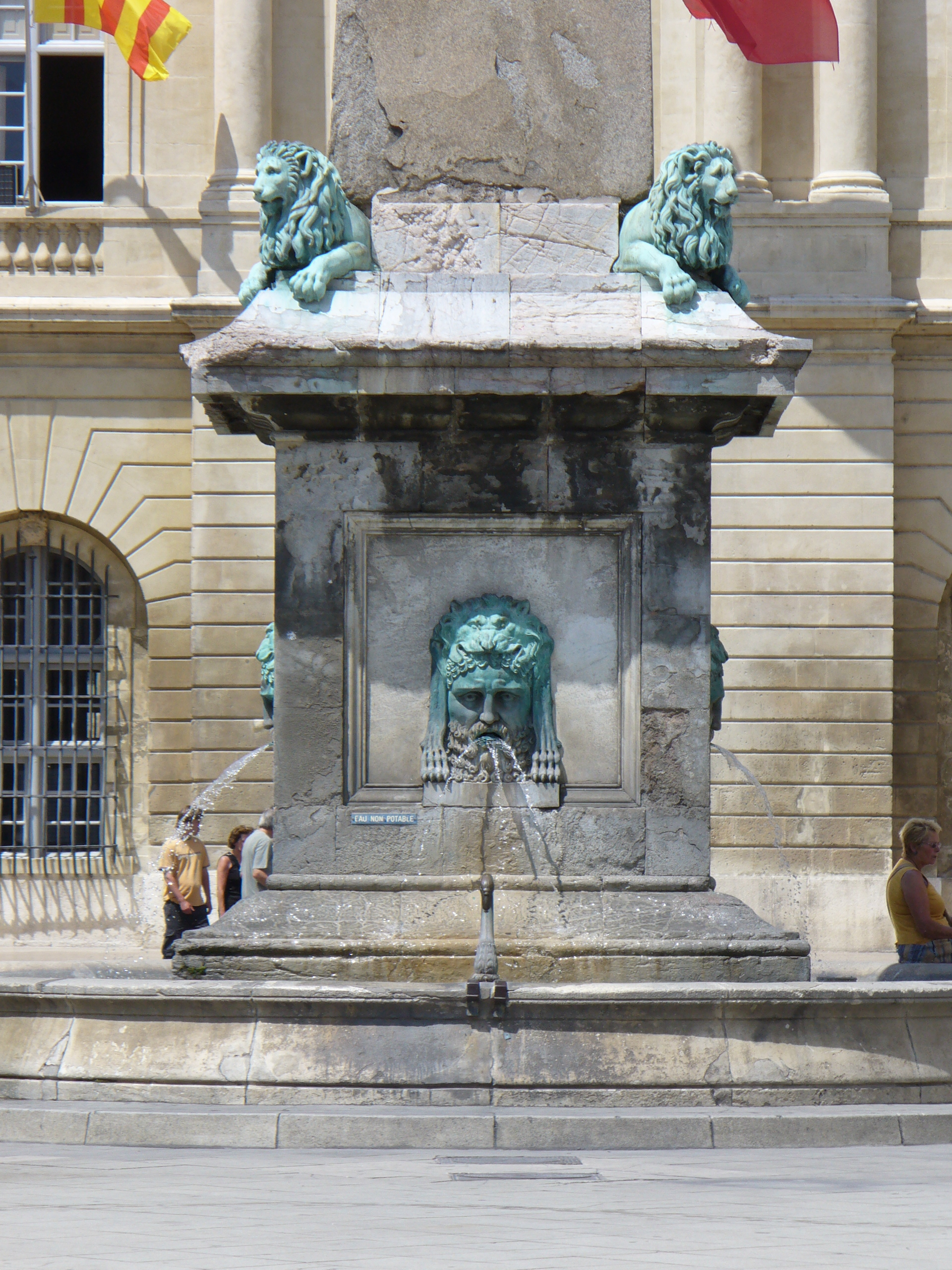
Fountain and sculptures by Antoine Laurent Dantan.

The obelisk was first erected under the Roman emperor Constantine II in the center of the spina of the Roman circus of Arles. After the circus was abandoned in the 6th century, the obelisk fell down and was broken in two parts. It was rediscovered in the 14th century and re-erected on top of a pedestal soon surmounted by a bronze globe and sun on 26 March 1676.

Designed by Jacques Peytret, these ornaments changed in times of political regimes. During the Revolution, the sun was replaced by a Phrygian cap; under the Empire, the eagle replaced the cap; under Louis-Philippe, the royal sun took the place of the rooster hunting the eagle. Since 1866, the ornaments were permanently removed and replaced by a bronze capstone until a fountain and the sculptures around it were designed by Antoine Laurent Dantan in the 19th century.

== Conservation ==
This obelisk was listed on the 1840 inventory of historic sites in France. It is part of a 1981-designated UNESCO World Heritage Site, the Arles, Roman and Romanesque Monuments.

== See also ==
- List of World Heritage Sites in Europe
