= Arles =

City in Provence, France

Arles Arle (Occitan)
- Subprefecture and commune
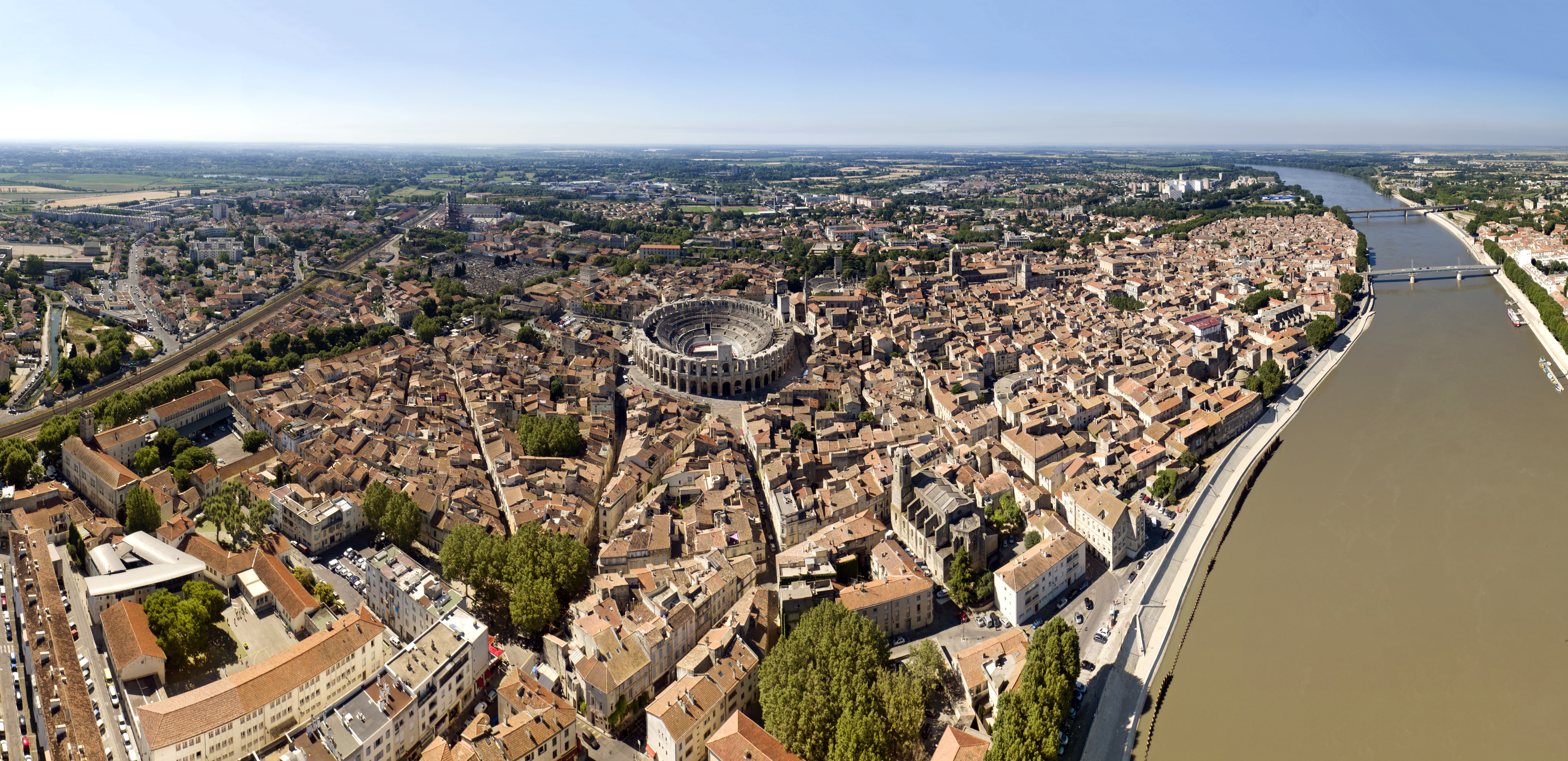
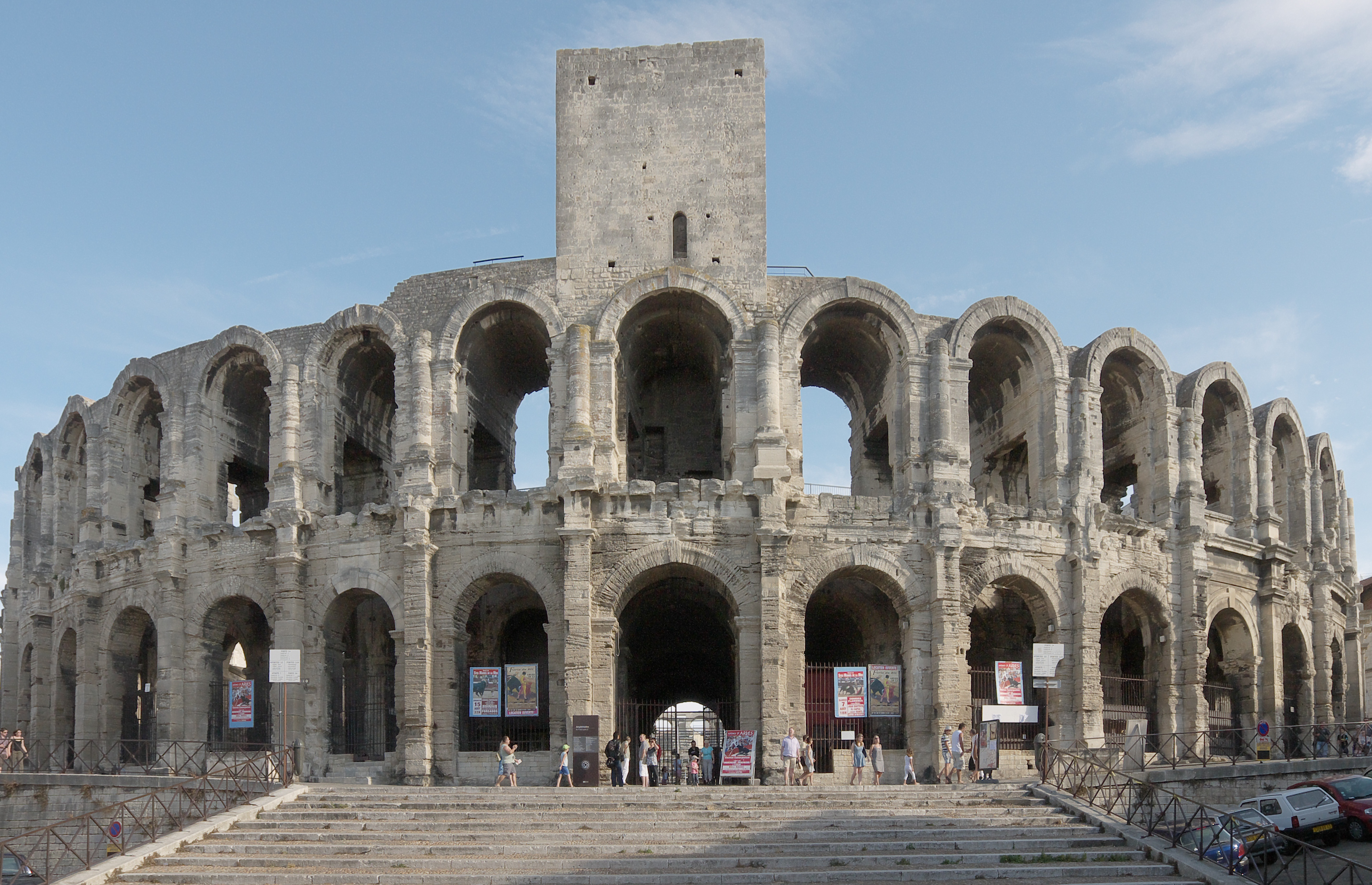
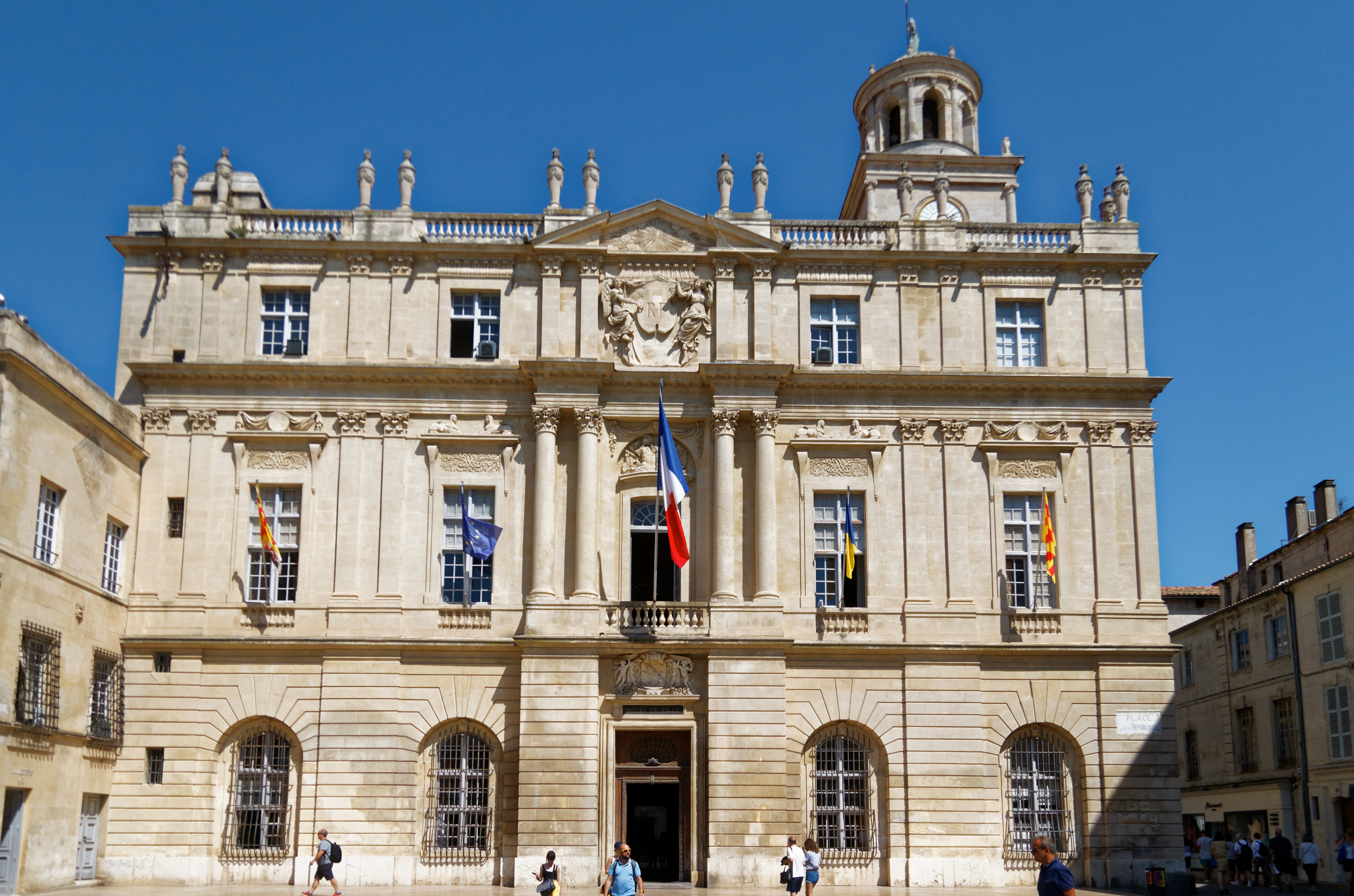
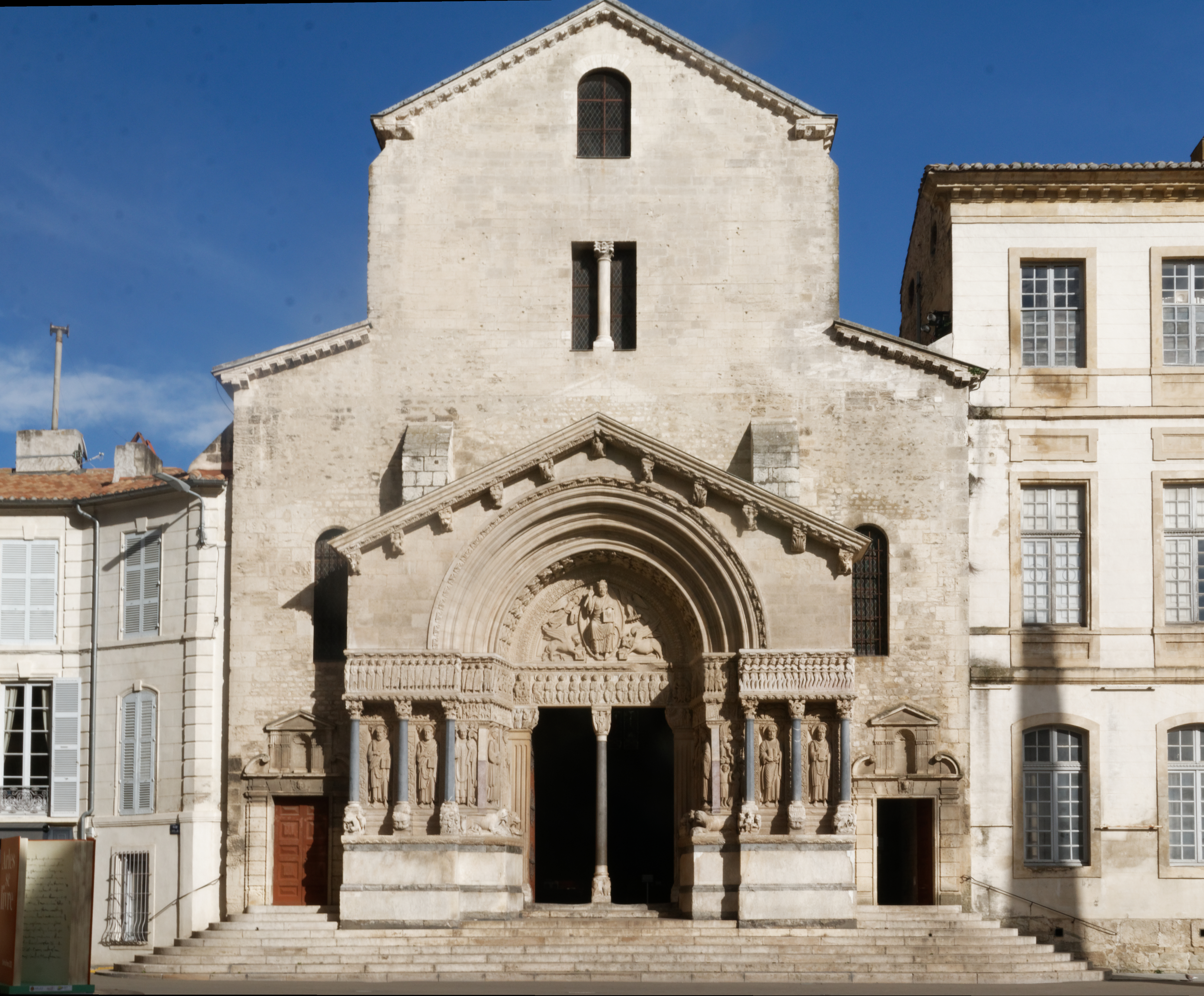
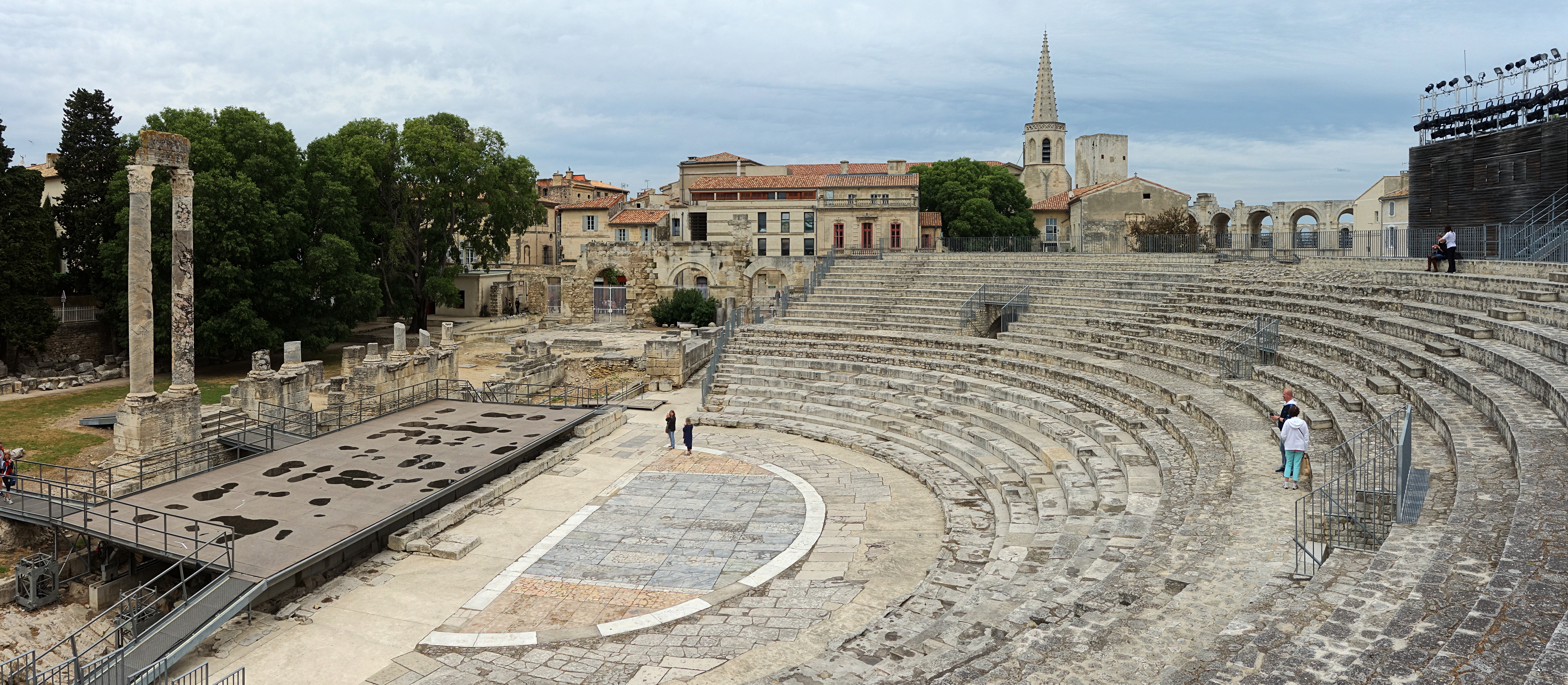
- Aerial view of Arles and the Rhône Arles Amphitheatre Hôtel de Ville Church of St. Trophime Roman Theatre

- Flag Coat of arms
- Location of Arles
- Location within France Location within Provence-Alpes-Côte d'Azur
- Coordinates: 43°40′36″N 4°37′40″E
- Country: France
- Region: Provence-Alpes-Côte d'Azur
- Department: Bouches-du-Rhône
- Arrondissement: Arles
- Canton: Arles
- Intercommunality: Arles-Crau-Camargue-Montagnette

Government
  - Mayor (2026–32): Patrick de Carolis
- Area^{1}: 758.93 km^{2} (293.02 sq mi)
- Elevation: 10 m (33 ft)
- Highest elevation: 57 m (187 ft)
- Lowest elevation: 0 m (0 ft)
- Population (2023): 51,811
  - Density: 68.268/km^{2} (176.81/sq mi)
- Time zone: UTC+01:00 (CET)
  - Summer (DST): UTC+02:00 (CEST)
- INSEE/Postal code: 13004 /13200
- ^{1} French Land Register data, which excludes lakes, ponds, glaciers > 1 km^{2} (0.386 sq mi or 247 acres) and river estuaries.

Arles (French: [aʁl]; (Note: /ɑːrl(z)/ ARL(Z), US also /ˈɑːrəl/ AR-əl,) Provençal: Arle [ˈaʀle]) (Note: Classical Latin: Arelate) is a coastal city and commune in southern France, a subprefecture in the Bouches-du-Rhône department of the Provence-Alpes-Côte d'Azur region, in the former province of Provence.

A large part of the Camargue, the largest wetlands in France, is located within the territory of the commune, which is the largest in Metropolitan France in terms of geographic territory. In non-metropolitan France, Maripasoula in French Guiana is the largest French commune in general.

The city has a long history, and was of considerable importance in the Roman province of Gallia Narbonensis. The Roman and Romanesque Monuments of Arles were listed as UNESCO World Heritage Sites in 1981 for their testimony to the history of the region.

The city is famous for being the archdiocese of Caesarius of Arles and Hilary of Arles. Additionally, many artists have lived and worked in this area, including Pablo Picasso, Paul Gauguin and Jacques Réattu. The Dutch post-Impressionist painter Vincent van Gogh lived in Arles from 1888 to 1889, and produced over 300 paintings and drawings during his time there. These are held in internationally known museums and private collections around the world. An international photography festival has been held annually in the city since 1970.

== Name ==
The settlement is attested as Arelate in the mid-1st century BC (Caesar), Areláte (Ἀρελάτη) in the early 1st c. AD (Strabo), Arlate civitas in 954, and Arle in the 13th century. The toponym Arelate is a Latinized form of the Gaulish *Arelati, meaning 'by the marsh', or 'in front of the marsh'.

== Geography ==
The river Rhône forks into two branches just upstream of Arles, forming the Camargue delta. Because the Camargue is for a large part administratively part of Arles, the commune as a whole is the largest in Metropolitan France. Over seven times greater in area than Paris, Arles occupies 758.93 km^{2} (293.02 sq mi) and has a population of 51,156.

In addition to the city proper in the north of the territory, the commune of Arles includes a number of outlying towns and hamlets, including Albaron, Gageron, Mas-Thibert, Moulès, Pont-de-Crau, Raphèle-lès-Arles, Saliers, Salin-de-Giraud and Le Sambuc.

== History ==
=== Iron Age ===
The Ligurians were in this area from about 800 BC. Later Celtic influences have also been discovered. The city became an important Greek (from Massalia) and Phoenician trading port, before it was taken over by the Romans.

In the 6th century BCE, Greek merchants sailed up the Rhône river, 38 km north of the Mediterranean coast discovering a hill surrounded by wetland marshes and inhabited by a small tribe of Ligures. Archaelogical digs have shown they used greek furniture, indicating Arles was established as a Greek trading base. Arelate means "town by the marsh". The Greeks had already founded Marseille (Massalia) and the Greek merchants saw potential in this new site. Arles was on a geographical important location, the first place to cross the Rhône from the sea. It also was at the intersection of major trade routes, and the main route from Italy to Spain.

=== Roman period ===
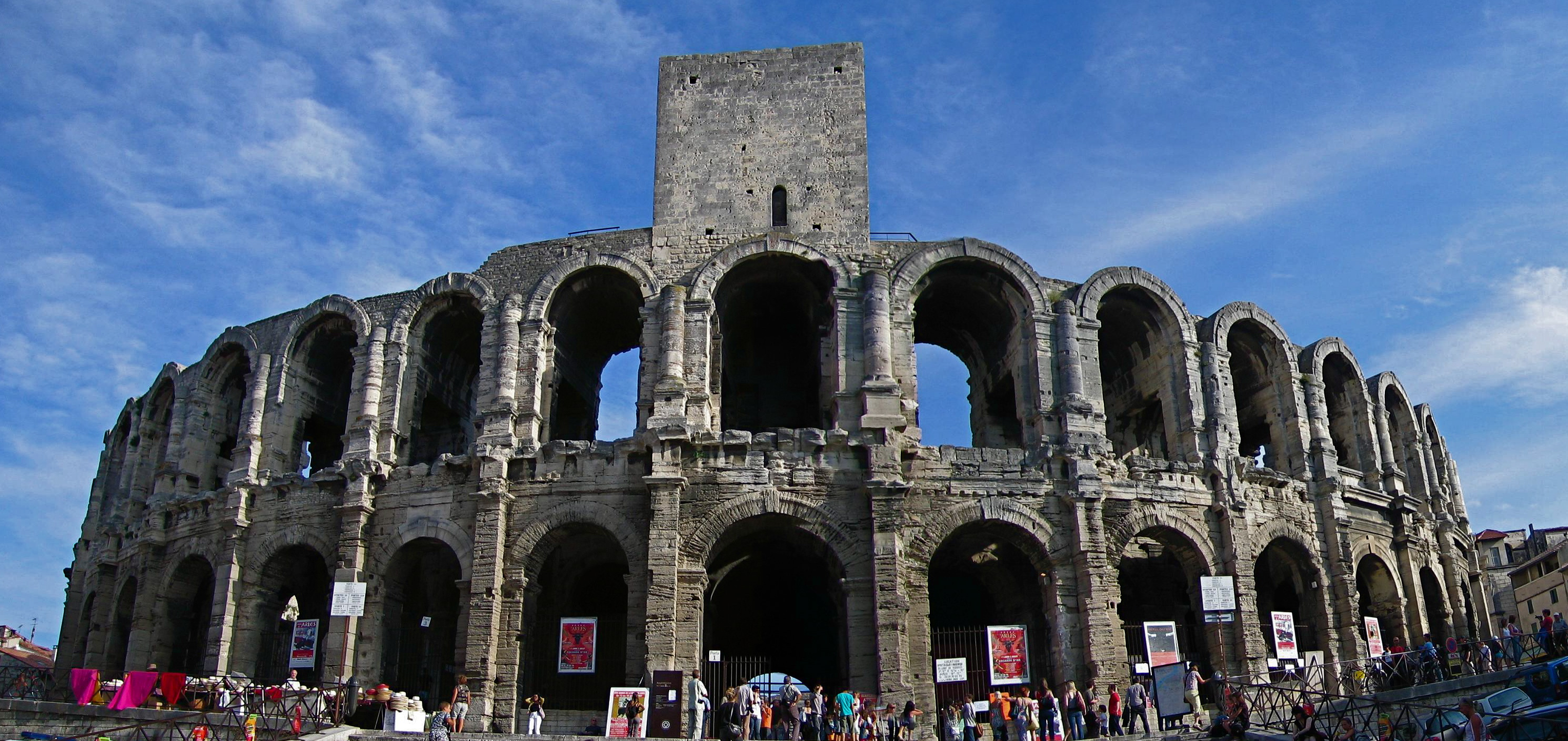
Arles Amphitheatre, a Roman arena

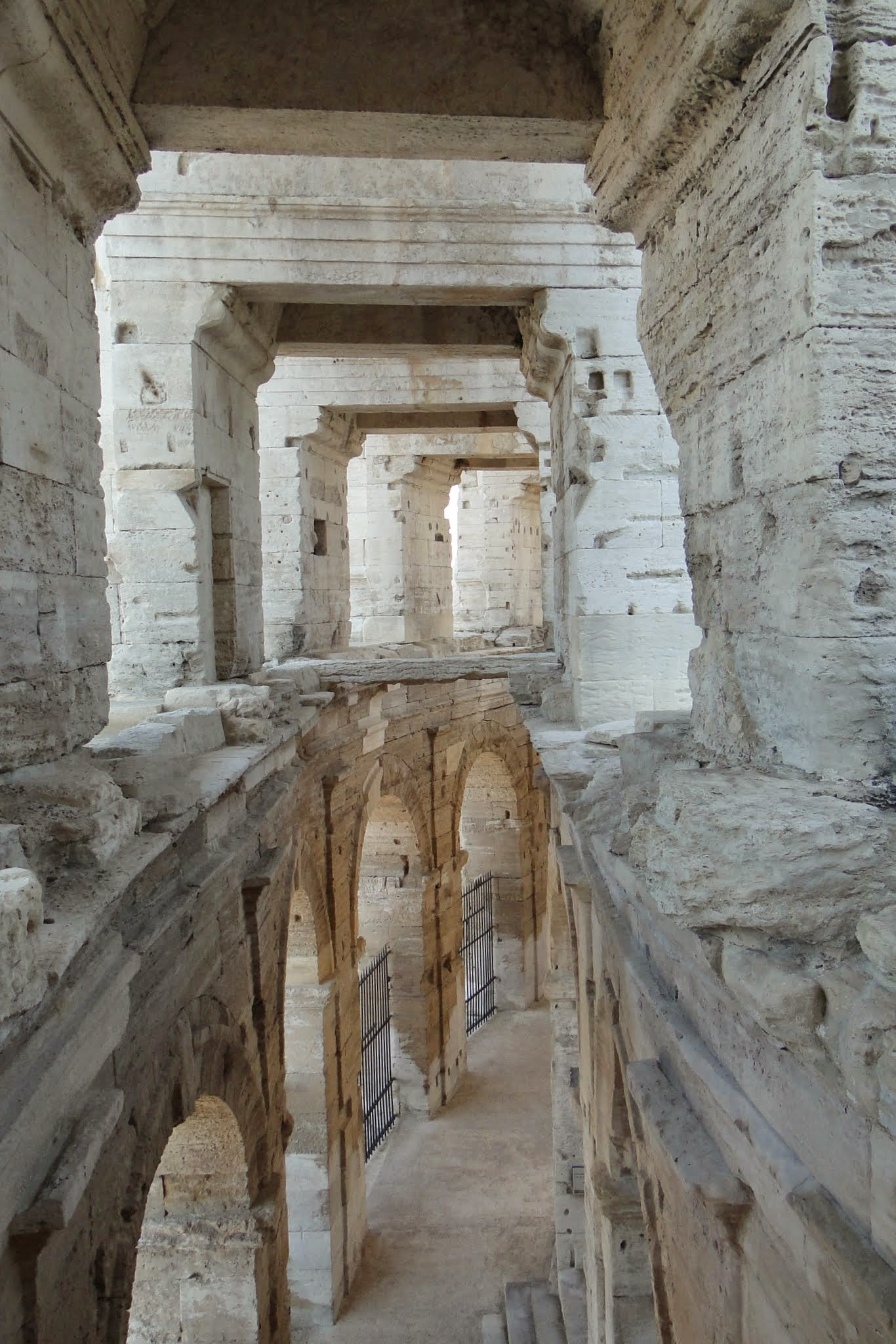
Passageway in the Amphitheatre

The Romans took the town in 123 BC and expanded it into an important city. They built a canal link to the Mediterranean Sea in 104 BC. Arles had to compete with Massalia (Marseille) further along the coast.

The recently discovered republican House of the Harpist is an exceptional example of ancient architecture and interior decoration. Dating from 70-50 BC, it has yielded elaborate frescoes.

Arles' leaders sided with Julius Caesar against Pompey, providing military support. Massalia backed Pompey; when Caesar emerged victorious, Massalia was stripped of its possessions, which were transferred to Arelate as a reward. The town was formally established as a colony for veterans of the Roman legion Legio VI Ferrata, which had its base there. Its full title as a colony was Colonia Iulia Paterna Arelatensium Sextanorum, "the ancestral Julian colony of Arles of the soldiers of the Sixth."

Arelate was a city of considerable importance in the province of Gallia Narbonensis. It covered an area of some 40 hectares (99 acres) and possessed a number of monuments, including an amphitheatre, triumphal arch, Roman circus, theatre, and a full circuit of walls. Ancient Arles was closer to the sea than it is now and served as a major port. The river has carried centuries of silt that has filled in the former harbor. The city had (and still has) the southernmost bridge on the Rhône.

The Roman bridge was unique in that it was not fixed but consisted of a pontoon-style bridge of boats, with towers and drawbridges at each end. The boats were secured in place by anchors and were tethered to twin towers built just upstream of the bridge. This unusual design was a way of coping with the river's frequent violent floods, which would have made short work of a conventional bridge. Nothing remains of the Roman bridge, which has been replaced by a more modern bridge near the same spot.

The city reached a peak of influence during the 4th and 5th centuries, when Roman Emperors frequently used it as their headquarters during military campaigns in Europe. In 395, it became the seat of the Praetorian Prefecture of the Gauls, governing the western part of the Western Empire: Gaul proper plus Hispania (Spain) and Armorica (Brittany). At that time, the city was home to an estimated 75,000–100,000 people.

The city also dominated the Rhone Valley, the main connection between North Gaul, Italy and the Mediterranean Sea. This natural corridor between the Central Massive and the Alps was a crucial route for troop movements, communication and supply. Those who controlled Arles actually controlled strategic access to Gaul. It was often the subject of hostilities for that reason, especially in the 5th century.

It became a favorite city of Emperor Constantine I, who built baths there, substantial remains of which are still standing. His son, Constantine II, was born in Arles. Usurper Constantine III declared himself emperor in the West (407–411) and made Arles his capital in 408.

Arles became renowned as a cultural and religious centre during the late Roman Empire. It was the birthplace of Favorinus, known as the sceptical philosopher. It was also a key location for Roman Christianity and an important base for the Christianization of Gaul. The city's bishopric was held by a series of outstanding clerics, beginning with Saint Trophimus around 225 and continuing with Saint Honoratus, then Saint Hilarius in the first half of the 5th century. The political tension between the Catholic bishops of Arles and the Visigothic kings is epitomized in the career of the Frankish St. Caesarius, bishop of Arles 503–542. Suspected by the Arian Visigoth Alaric II of conspiring with the Burgundians to turn over the Arelate to Burgundy, he was exiled for a year to Bordeaux in Aquitaine. Political tensions were evident again in 512, when Arles held out against Theodoric the Great. Caesarius was imprisoned and sent to Ravenna to explain his actions before the Ostrogothic king.

The friction between the Arian Christianity of the Visigoths and the Catholicism of the bishops sent out from Rome established deep roots for religious heterodoxy, even heresy, in Occitan culture. At Treves in 385, Priscillian achieved the distinction of becoming the first Christian executed for heresy (Manichaean in his case, see also Cathars, Camisards). Despite this tension and the city's decline in the face of barbarian invasions, Arles remained a great religious centre. It hosted church councils (see Council of Arles), the rival of Vienne, for hundreds of years.

=== Roman aqueduct and mill ===
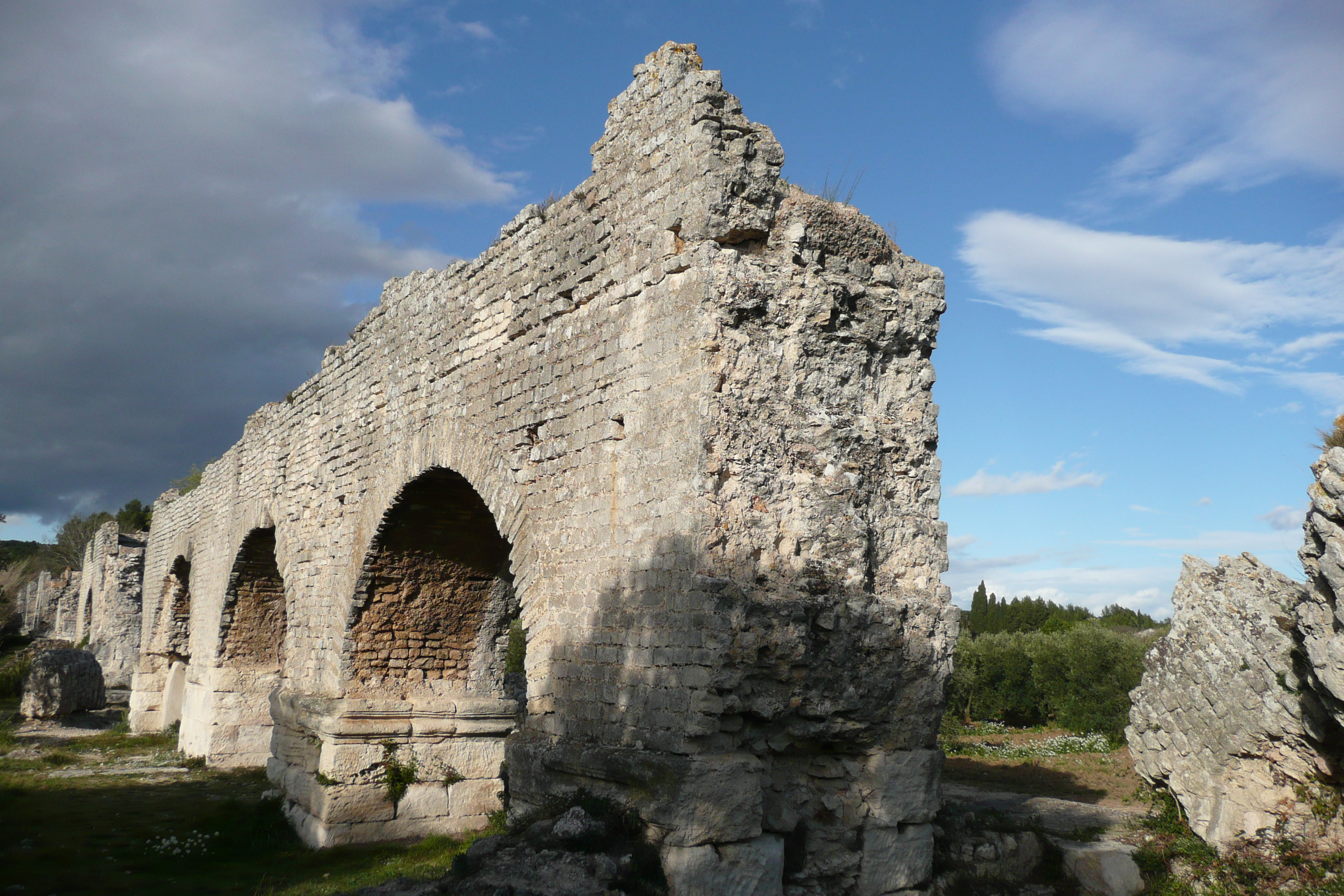
Aqueduct of Arles at Barbegal

The Barbegal aqueduct and mill is a Roman watermill complex located on the territory of the commune of Fontvieille, a few kilometres from Arles. The complex has been referred to as "the greatest known concentration of mechanical power in the ancient world". The remains of the mill streams and buildings which housed the overshot water wheels are still visible at the site, and it is by far the best-preserved of ancient mills. There are two aqueducts which join just north of the mill complex, and a sluice which enabled the operators to control the water supply to the complex. The mill consisted of 16 water wheels in two separate rows built into a steep hillside. There are substantial masonry remains of the water channels and foundations of the individual mills, together with a staircase rising up the hill upon which the mills are built. The mills apparently operated from the end of the 1st century until about the end of the 3rd century. The capacity of the mills has been estimated at 4.5 tons of flour per day, sufficient to supply enough bread for 12,000 of the 30,000–40,000 inhabitants of Arelate at that time. A similar mill complex existed also on the Janiculum in Rome. Examination of the mill leat still just visible on one side of the hill shows a substantial accretion of lime in the channel, tending to confirm its long working life.

It is thought that the wheels were overshot water wheels with the outflow from the top driving the next one down and so on, to the base of the hill. Vertical water mills were well known to the Romans, being described by Vitruvius in his De Architectura of 25 BC, and mentioned by Pliny the Elder in his Natural History of 77 AD. There are also later references to floating water mills from Byzantium and to sawmills on the river Moselle by the poet Ausonius. The use of multiple stacked sequences of reverse overshot water wheels was widespread in Roman mines.

=== Middle Ages ===
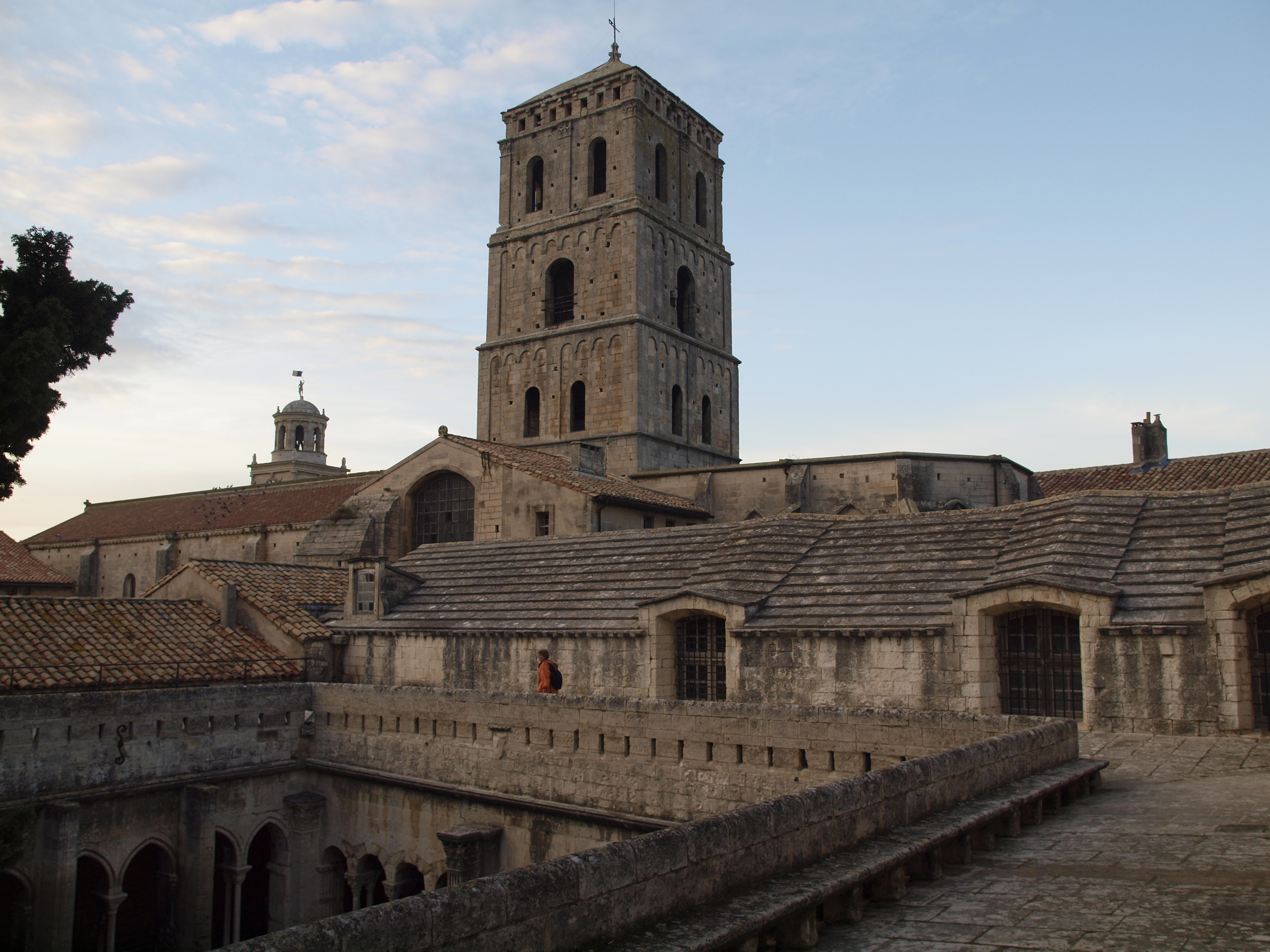
Church of St. Trophime and its cloister

In 735, after raiding the Lower Rhône, Andalusian Saracens led by Yusuf ibn 'Abd al-Rahman al-Fihri moved into the stronghold summoned by Count Maurontus, who feared Charles Martel's expansionist ambitions, though this may have been an excuse to further Muslim expansion beyond Iberia. The next year, Charles campaigned south to Septimania and Provence, attacking and capturing Arles from the Muslim Arabs after destroying Avignon. In 739, Charles definitively drove Maurontus to exile, and brought Provence to heel. Louis the Pious, in 829, placed Arles under royal protection and assigned it with special privileges. In 855, it was made the capital of a Frankish Kingdom of Burgundy, which included Burgundy and part of Provence, but was frequently terrorised by Saracen and Viking raiders. In 888, Rudolph, Count of Auxerre (now in north-western Burgundy), founded the kingdom of Transjuran Burgundy (literally, beyond the Jura mountains), which included western Switzerland as far as the river Reuss, Valais, Geneva, Chablais and Bugey.

In 933, Hugh of Arles ("Hugues de Provence") gave his kingdom up to Rudolph II, who merged the two kingdoms into a new Kingdom of Burgundy-Arles. In 1032, King Rudolph III died, and the kingdom was inherited by Emperor Conrad II the Salic. Though his successors counted themselves kings of Arles, few went to be crowned in the cathedral. Most of the kingdom's territory was progressively incorporated into France. During these troubled times, the amphitheatre was converted into a fortress, with watchtowers built at each of the four quadrants and a minuscule walled town being constructed within. The population was by now only a fraction of what it had been in Roman times, with much of old Arles lying in ruins.

The town regained political and economic prominence in the 12th century, with the Holy Roman Emperor Frederick Barbarossa traveling there in 1178 for his coronation. In the 12th century, it became a free city governed by an elected podestat (chief magistrate; literally "power"), who appointed the consuls and other magistrates. It retained this status until the French Revolution of 1789.

Arles joined the countship of Provence in 1239, but, once more, its prominence was eclipsed by Marseilles. In 1378, the Holy Roman Emperor Charles IV made the Dauphin of France (later King Charles VI of France) vicar of the moribund Kingdom of Burgundy-Arles for his lifetime. The kingdom ceased to have any political existence soon afterwards.

=== Modern era ===
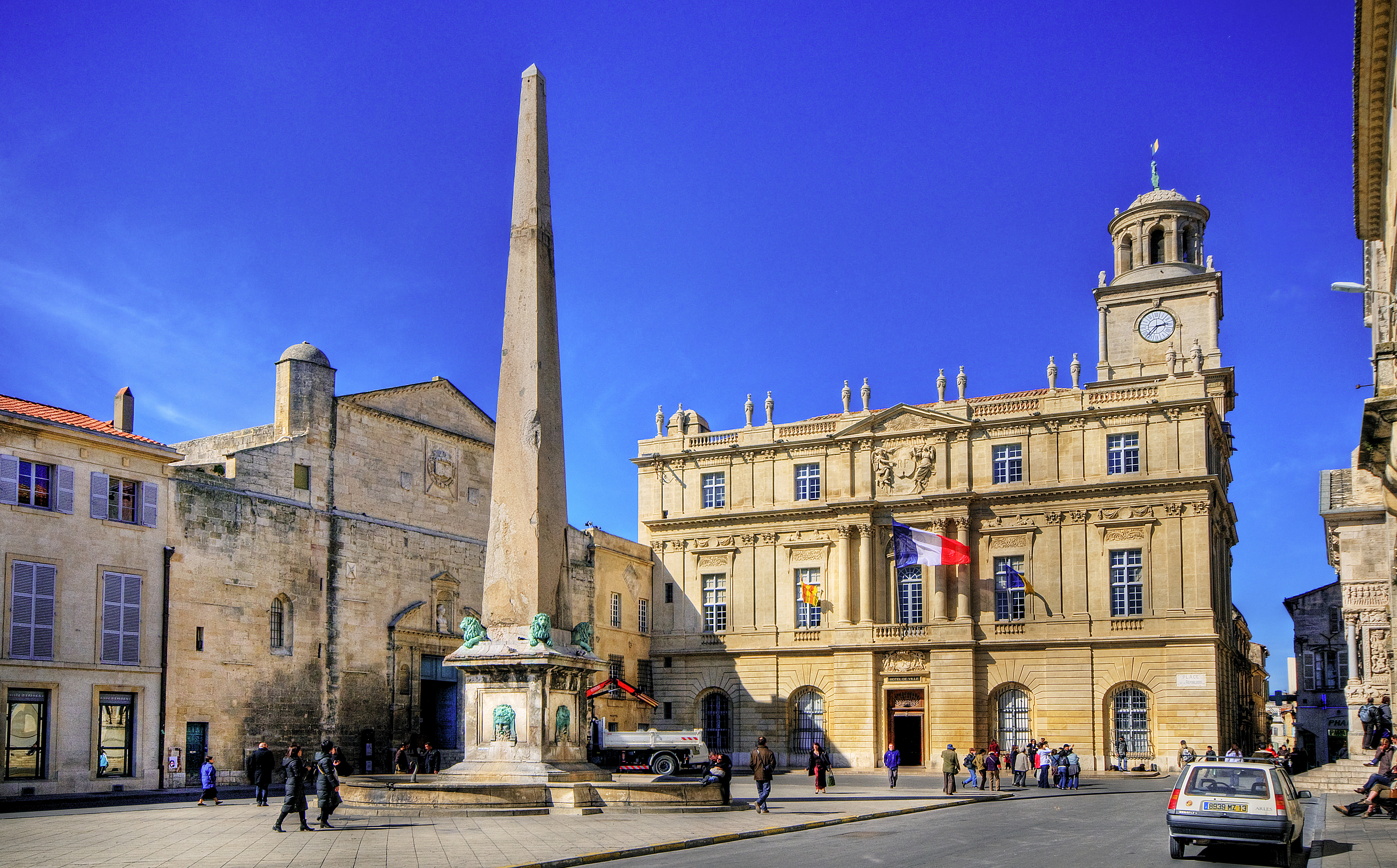
Place de la République and the Hôtel de Ville

Arles remained economically important for many years as a major port on the Rhône. The Hôtel de Ville was completed in 1676.

In the 19th century, the establishment of railways diminished river trade, leading to the city declining in prominence. This made it a destination for the painter Vincent van Gogh, who arrived there on 21 February 1888. He was fascinated by the Provençal landscapes, producing over 300 paintings and drawings during his time in Arles. Many of his most famous paintings were completed there, including The Night Cafe, the Yellow Room, Starry Night Over the Rhone, and L'Arlésienne. Paul Gauguin visited van Gogh in Arles. However, van Gogh's mental health deteriorated and he became alarmingly eccentric, culminating in the ear-severing incident in December 1888 which resulted in two stays in the Old Hospital of Arles. The concerned Arlesians circulated a petition the following February demanding that van Gogh be confined. In May 1889, he voluntarily left Arles for the Saint-Paul asylum at nearby Saint-Rémy-de-Provence.

=== Jewish history ===
Arles had an important and prominent Jewish community between the Roman era and the end of the 15th century. A local legend describes the first Jews in Arles as exiles from Judaea after Jerusalem fell to the Romans. Nevertheless, the first documented evidence of Jews in Arles is not before the fifth century, when a distinguished community already existed in the town. Arles was an important Jewish crossroads, as a port city and close to Spain and the rest of Europe alike. It served a major role in the work of the Hachmei Provence group of famous Jewish scholars, translators and philosophers, who were most important to Judaism throughout the Middle Ages. In the eighth century, jurisdiction over the Jews of Arles was passed to the local Archbishop, making the Jewish taxes to the clergy somewhat of a shield for the community from mob attacks, most frequent during the Crusades. The community lived relatively peacefully until the last decade of the 15th century, when they were expelled from the city never to return. Several Jews did live in the city in the centuries after, though no community was found ever after. Nowadays, Jewish archaeological findings and texts from Arles can be found in the local museum.

== Climate ==
Arles has a hot summer Mediterranean climate (Köppen: Csa) with a mean annual temperature of 14.6 °C (1948–1999). The summers are warm and moderately dry, with seasonal averages between 22 °C and 24 °C, and cool to mild winters with a mean temperature of about 7 °C. The city is constantly, but especially in the winter months, subject to the influence of the mistral, a cold wind which can cause sudden and severe frosts. Rainfall (636 mm per year) is fairly evenly distributed from September to May, with the summer drought being less marked than in other Mediterranean areas.

Climate data for Arles (1991–2020 averages, extremes 1963–present)
Month	Jan	Feb	Mar	Apr	May	Jun	Jul	Aug	Sep	Oct	Nov	Dec	Year
Record high °C (°F)	21.0 (69.8)	23.1 (73.6)	25.7 (78.3)	29.3 (84.7)	33.0 (91.4)	42.8 (109.0)	37.7 (99.9)	38.7 (101.7)	33.8 (92.8)	31.5 (88.7)	25.0 (77.0)	20.0 (68.0)	42.8 (109.0)
Mean daily maximum °C (°F)	11.3 (52.3)	12.5 (54.5)	16.2 (61.2)	18.9 (66.0)	22.8 (73.0)	27.1 (80.8)	29.8 (85.6)	29.6 (85.3)	25.3 (77.5)	20.7 (69.3)	15.2 (59.4)	11.9 (53.4)	20.1 (68.2)
Daily mean °C (°F)	7.3 (45.1)	8.0 (46.4)	11.2 (52.2)	13.8 (56.8)	17.6 (63.7)	21.5 (70.7)	23.9 (75.0)	23.7 (74.7)	19.8 (67.6)	16.2 (61.2)	11.2 (52.2)	7.9 (46.2)	15.2 (59.4)
Mean daily minimum °C (°F)	3.4 (38.1)	3.4 (38.1)	6.1 (43.0)	8.7 (47.7)	12.4 (54.3)	16.0 (60.8)	18.0 (64.4)	17.7 (63.9)	14.4 (57.9)	11.6 (52.9)	7.3 (45.1)	4.0 (39.2)	10.3 (50.5)
Record low °C (°F)	−10.6 (12.9)	−12.0 (10.4)	−7.3 (18.9)	−1.7 (28.9)	2.2 (36.0)	6.0 (42.8)	9.7 (49.5)	8.5 (47.3)	5.5 (41.9)	0.3 (32.5)	−7.4 (18.7)	−6.4 (20.5)	−12.0 (10.4)
Average precipitation mm (inches)	53.5 (2.11)	33.3 (1.31)	33.9 (1.33)	57.3 (2.26)	40.1 (1.58)	27.0 (1.06)	12.9 (0.51)	26.9 (1.06)	83.7 (3.30)	80.9 (3.19)	76.5 (3.01)	43.6 (1.72)	569.6 (22.43)
Average precipitation days (≥ 1.0 mm)	5.1	4.2	4.5	5.6	4.8	2.9	2.0	2.4	4.8	5.7	7.0	5.4	54.3
Source: Météo France

== Population ==
The population data in the table and graph below refer to the commune of Arles proper, in its geography at the given years. The commune of Arles ceded part of its territory to the new commune of Port-Saint-Louis-du-Rhône in 1904, and to the new commune of Saint-Martin-de-Crau in 1925.

Historical population

Year	Pop.	±% p.a.
1793	20,000	—
1800	18,470	−1.13%
1806	20,151	+1.46%
1821	20,150	−0.00%
1831	20,236	+0.04%
1836	20,048	−0.19%
1841	20,460	+0.41%
1846	23,101	+2.46%
1851	23,208	+0.09%
1856	24,816	+1.35%
1861	25,543	+0.58%
1866	26,367	+0.64%
1872	24,695	−1.09%
1876	25,095	+0.40%
1881	23,480	−1.32%
1886	23,491	+0.01%
1891	24,288	+0.67%
1896	24,567	+0.23%
1901	29,314	+3.60%

Year	Pop.	±% p.a.
1906	28,116	−0.83%
1911	31,010	+1.98%
1921	31,014	+0.00%
1926	29,146	−1.23%
1931	32,485	+2.19%
1936	29,165	−2.13%
1946	35,017	+1.85%
1954	37,443	+0.84%
1962	41,932	+1.43%
1968	45,774	+1.47%
1975	50,059	+1.29%
1982	50,500	+0.13%
1990	52,058	+0.38%
1999	50,426	−0.35%
2007	52,197	+0.43%
2012	52,439	+0.09%
2017	52,548	+0.04%
2023	51,811	−0.24%

Source: EHESS and INSEE (1968-2023)

== Main sights ==
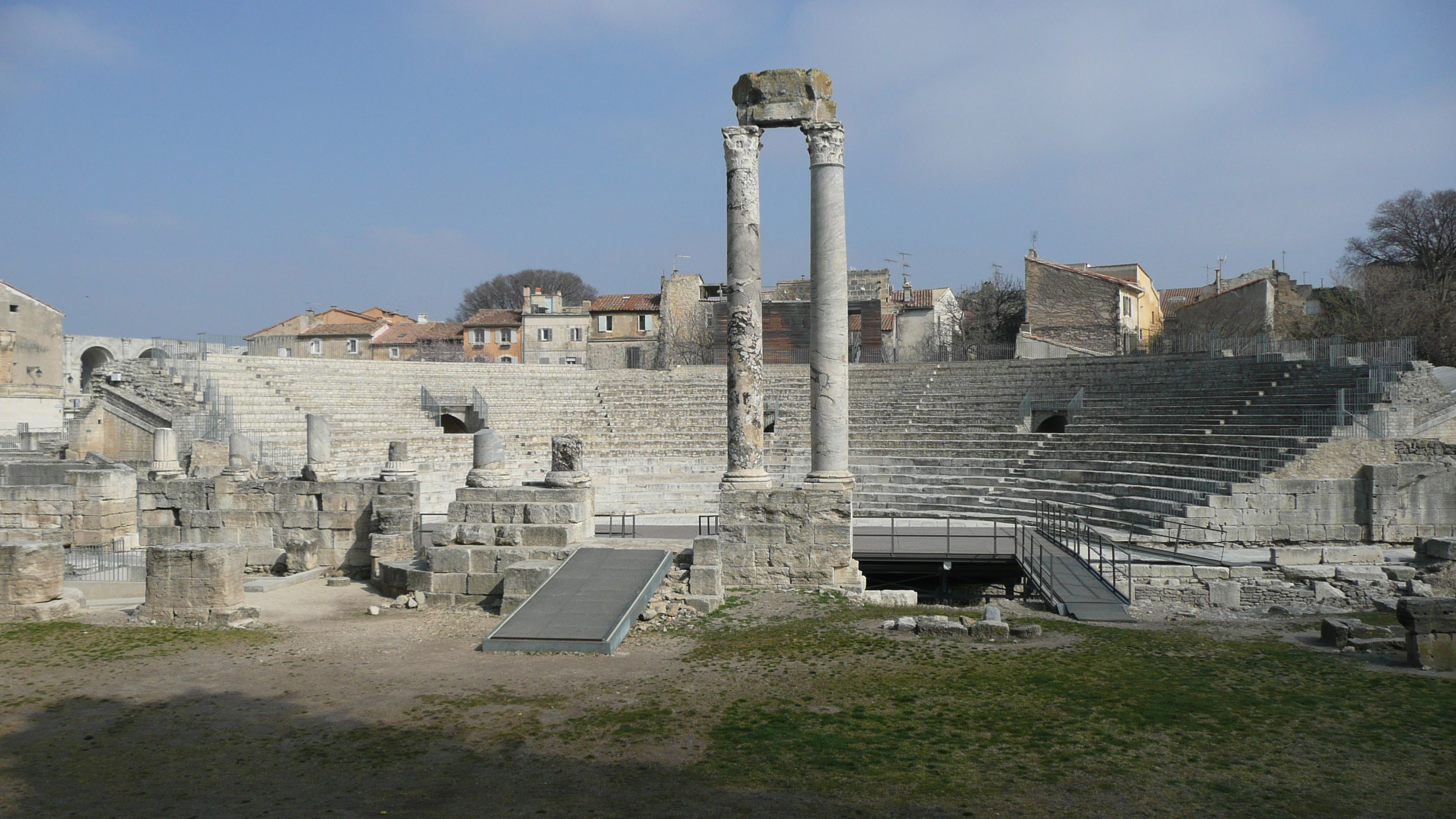
The Theatre of Arles, a 1st-century Roman theatre, built during the reign of Caesar Augustus

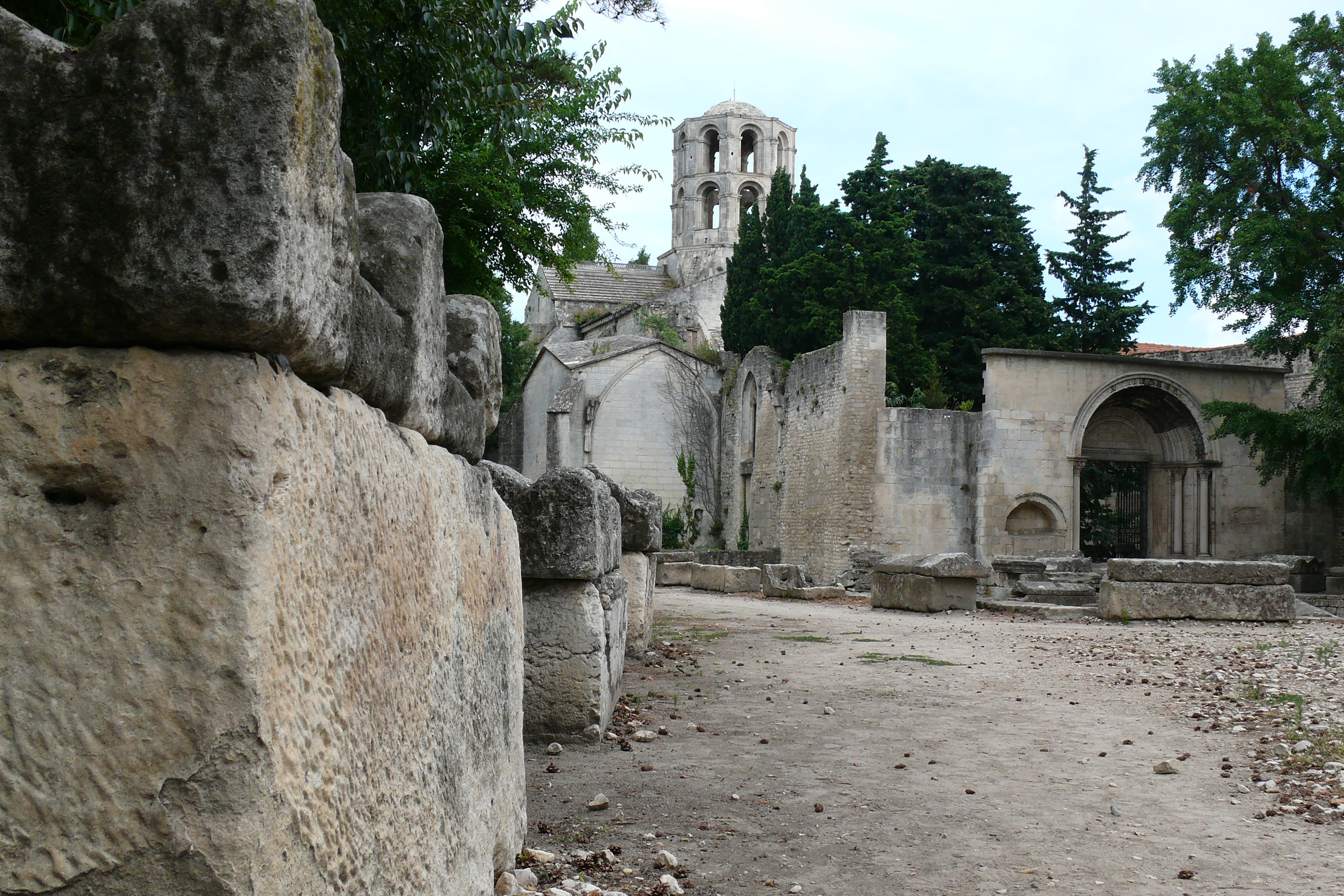
The Alyscamps, a Roman necropolis

Arles has important Roman remnants, most of which have been listed as UNESCO World Heritage Sites since 1981 within the Arles, Roman and Romanesque Monuments group. They include:

- The Roman Theatre of Arles
- The arena or amphitheatre
- The Alyscamps (Roman necropolis)
- The Thermae of Constantine
- The cryptoporticus
- Arles Obelisk
- Barbegal aqueduct and mill
- The Church of St. Trophime (Saint Trophimus), formerly a cathedral, is a major work of Romanesque architecture, and the representation of the Last Judgment on its portal is considered one of the finest examples of Romanesque sculpture, as are the columns in the adjacent cloister.

The town also has a museum of ancient history, the Musée de l'Arles et de la Provence antiques, with one of the best collections of Roman sarcophagi to be found anywhere outside Rome itself. Other museums include the Musée Réattu and the Museon Arlaten.

The courtyard of the Old Arles hospital, now named "Espace Van Gogh," is a center for Vincent van Gogh's works, several of which are masterpieces. The garden, framed on all four sides by buildings of the complex, is approached through arcades on the first floor. A circulation gallery is located on the first and second floors.

The LUMA Tower is a 56-meter tall construction, the center of the LUMA Arles arts center.

== Archaeology ==
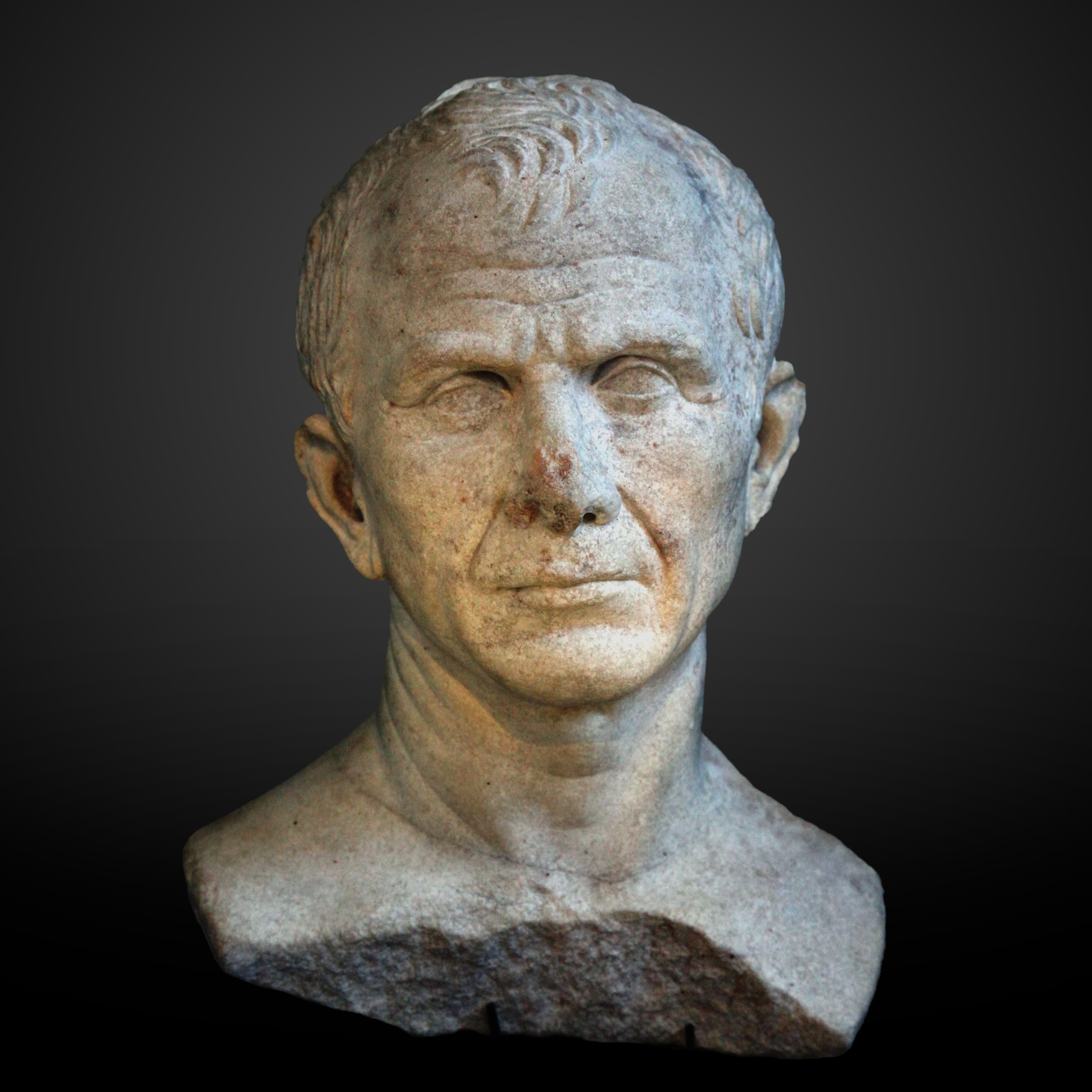
The Arles portrait bust, possibly of Julius Caesar c. 1st century BC

In September–October 2007, divers led by Lucas Longas from the French Department of Subaquatic Archaeological Research, headed by Michel L'Hour, discovered a life-sized marble bust of an apparently important Roman person in the Rhône near Arles, together with smaller statues of Marsyas in Hellenistic style and of the god Neptune from the third century AD. The larger bust was tentatively dated to 46 BC. Since the bust displayed several characteristics of an ageing person with wrinkles, deep naso-labial creases and hollows in his face, and since the archaeologists believed that Julius Caesar had founded the colony Colonia Iulia Paterna Arelate Sextanorum in 46 BC, the scientists came to the preliminary conclusion that the bust depicted a life-portrait of the Roman dictator: France's Minister of Culture Christine Albanel reported on 13 May 2008 that the bust would be the oldest representation of Caesar known today. The story was picked up by all larger media outlets. The realism of the portrait was said to place it in the tradition of late Republican portrait and genre sculptures. The archaeologists further claimed that a bust of Julius Caesar might have been thrown away or discreetly disposed of, because Caesar's portraits could have been viewed as politically dangerous possessions after the dictator's assassination.

Historians and archaeologists not affiliated with the French administration, among them Paul Zanker, an archaeologist and expert on Caesar and Augustus, were quick to question whether the bust is a portrait of Caesar. Many noted the lack of resemblances to Caesar's likenesses issued on coins during the last years of the dictator's life, and to the Tusculum bust of Caesar, which depicts Julius Caesar in his lifetime, either as a so-called zeitgesicht or as a direct portrait. After a further stylistic assessment, Zanker dated the Arles-bust to the Augustan period. Elkins argued for the third century AD as the terminus post quem for the deposition of the statues, refuting the claim that the bust was thrown away due to feared repercussions from Caesar's assassination in 44 BC. The main argument by the French archaeologists that Caesar had founded the colony in 46 BC proved to be incorrect, as the colony was founded by Caesar's former quaestor Tiberius Claudius Nero on the dictator's orders in his absence. Mary Beard has accused the persons involved in the find of having willfully invented their claims for publicity reasons. The French ministry of culture has not yet responded to the criticism and negative reviews.

== Sport ==
AC Arles-Avignon was a professional French football team. They previously played in Championnat de France Amateur, the fourth division in French football, but were dissolved in 2016. They played at the Parc des Sports, which has a capacity of just over 17,000.

== Culture ==
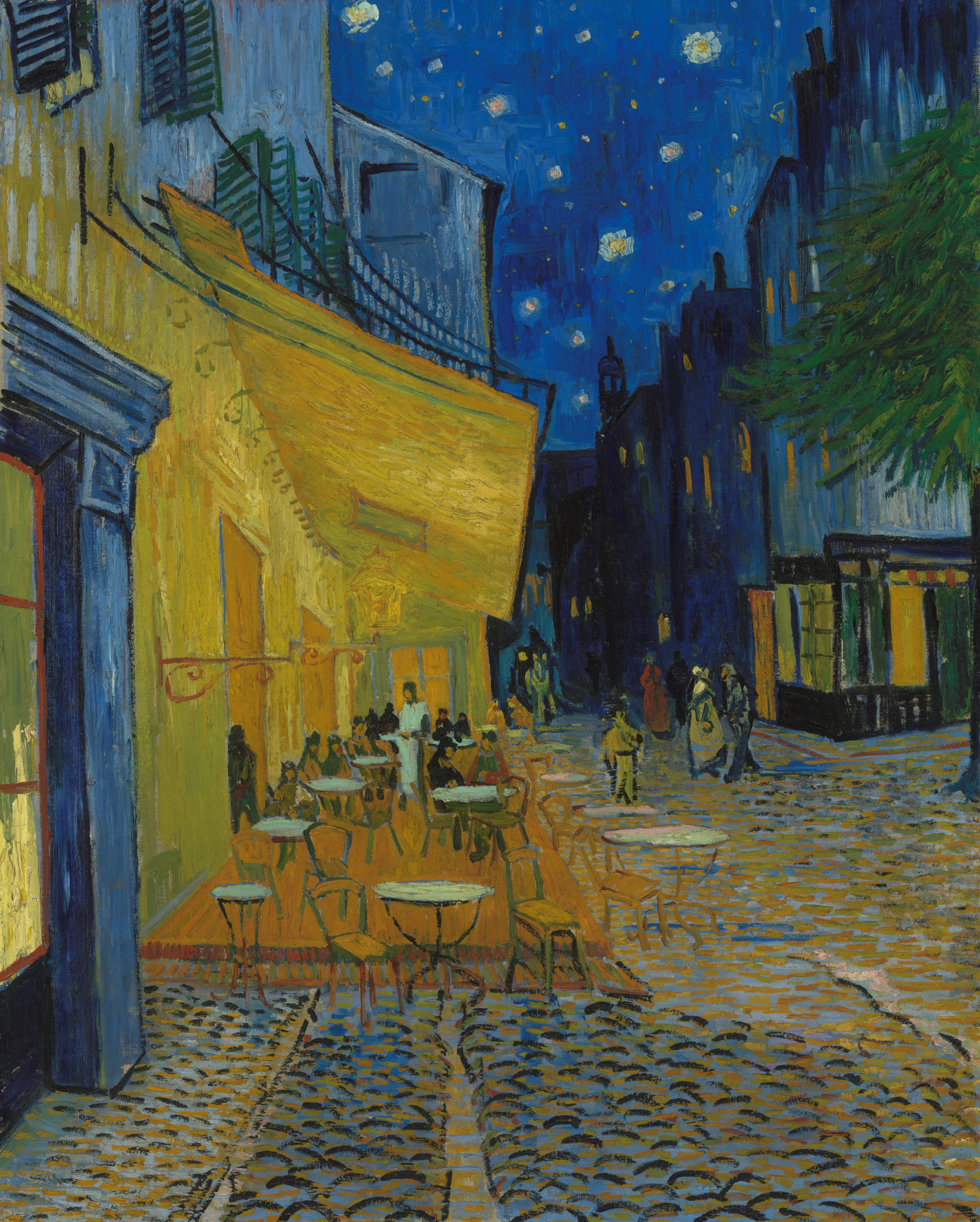
Cafe Terrace at Night by Vincent van Gogh (September 1888) depicts the warmth of a café in Arles.

=== Photography festival ===
A well known photography festival, Rencontres d'Arles, takes place in Arles every year.

=== Publishing ===
The major French publishing house Actes Sud is also situated in Arles.

=== Foundations ===
In the past years, several cultural organizations have set up a presence in Arles, such as the LUMA Foundation, the Fondation Vincent van Gogh Arles, the Manuel Rivera-Ortiz Foundation or the Lee Ufan Foundation. On top of that, there are countless galleries scattered throughout the city.

=== Bullfights ===
Bullfights are conducted in the amphitheatre, including Provençal-style bullfights (courses camarguaises) in which the bull is not killed, but rather a team of athletic men attempt to remove a tassel from the bull's horn without getting injured. Every Easter and on the first weekend of September, during the feria, Arles also holds Spanish-style corridas (in which the bulls are killed) with an encierro (bull-running in the streets) preceding each fight.

=== European Capital of Culture ===
Arles played a major role in Marseille-Provence 2013, the year-long series of cultural events held in the region after it was designated the European Capital of Culture for 2013. The city hosted a segment of the opening ceremony with a pyrotechnical performance by Groupe F on the banks of the Rhône. It also unveiled the new wing of the Musée Départemental Arles Antique as part of Marseille-Provence 2013.

== Economy ==
Arles's open-air street market is a major market in the region. It takes place on Saturday and Wednesday mornings.

== Transport ==
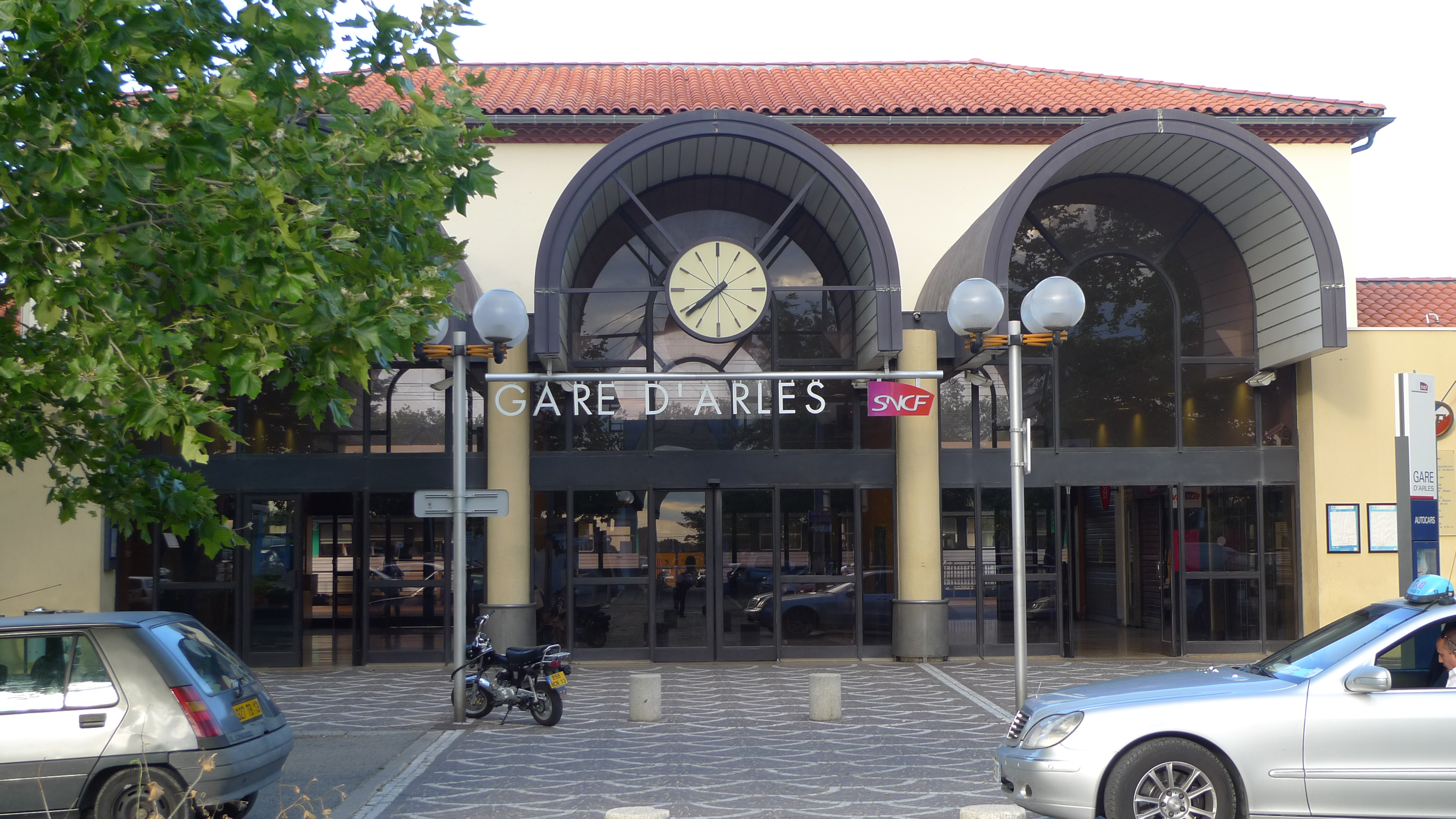
The Gare d'Arles, the city's train station

The Gare d'Arles railway station offers connections to Avignon, Nîmes, Marseille, Paris, Bordeaux and several regional destinations.

Arles does not have its own commercial airport, but is served by a number of airports in the region, most notably the major international airport of Marseille Provence approximately an hour's drive away.

The A54 autoroute toll motorway, which locally connects Salon-de-Provence with Nîmes and in a wider sense forms part of European route E80, passes by Arles.

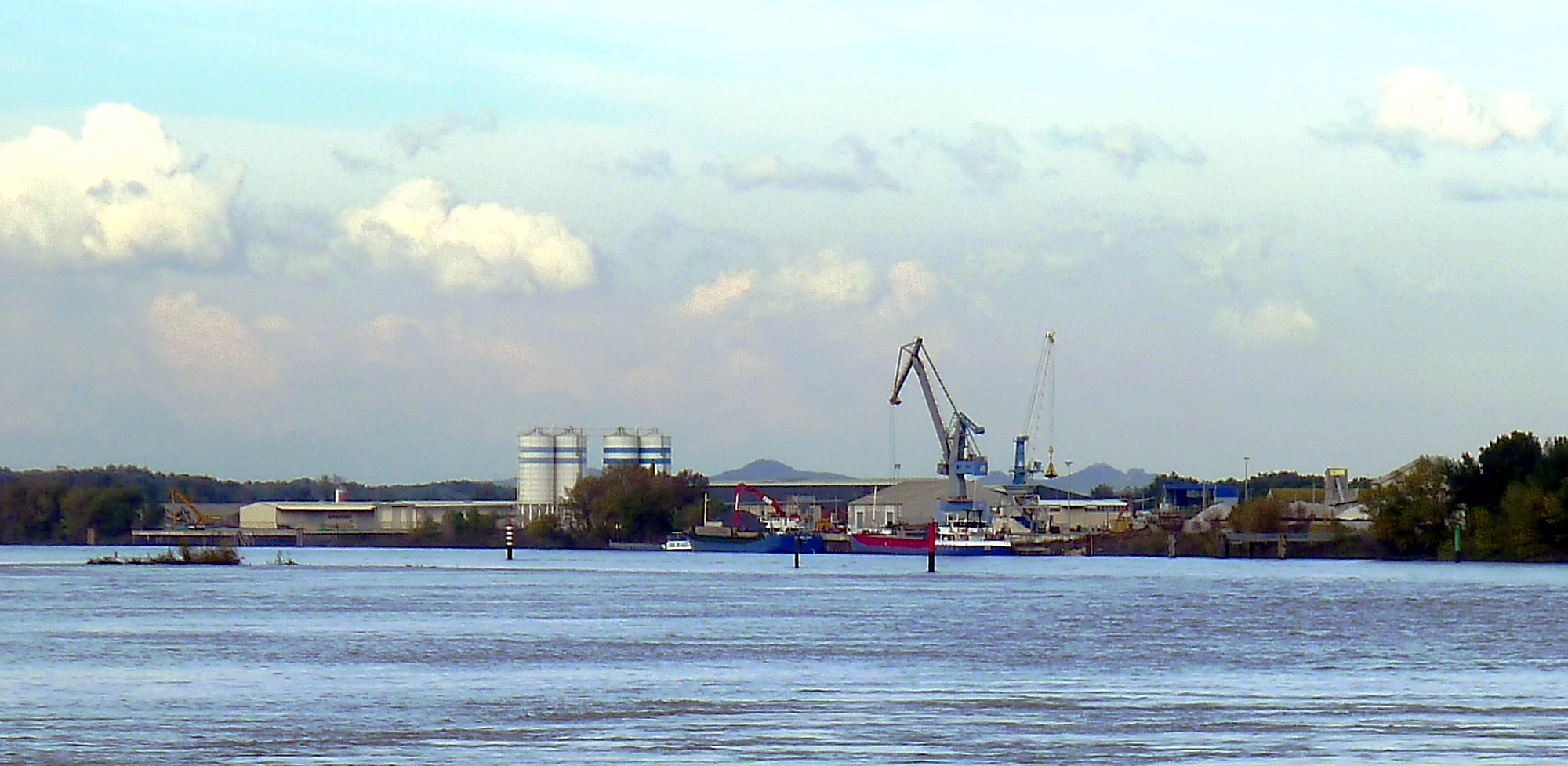
The Port of Arles links the Rhône river with the Mediterranean Sea

The Rhône, which for navigation purposes is classified as a Class V waterway as far upstream as Lyon, is a historically important transport route connecting the inland Rhône-Alpes region with the Mediterranean Sea. The port of Arles and its adjacent rail and road connections provides a major transshipment node, which in 2013 handled approximately 450,000 tonnes of goods.

== Notable people ==
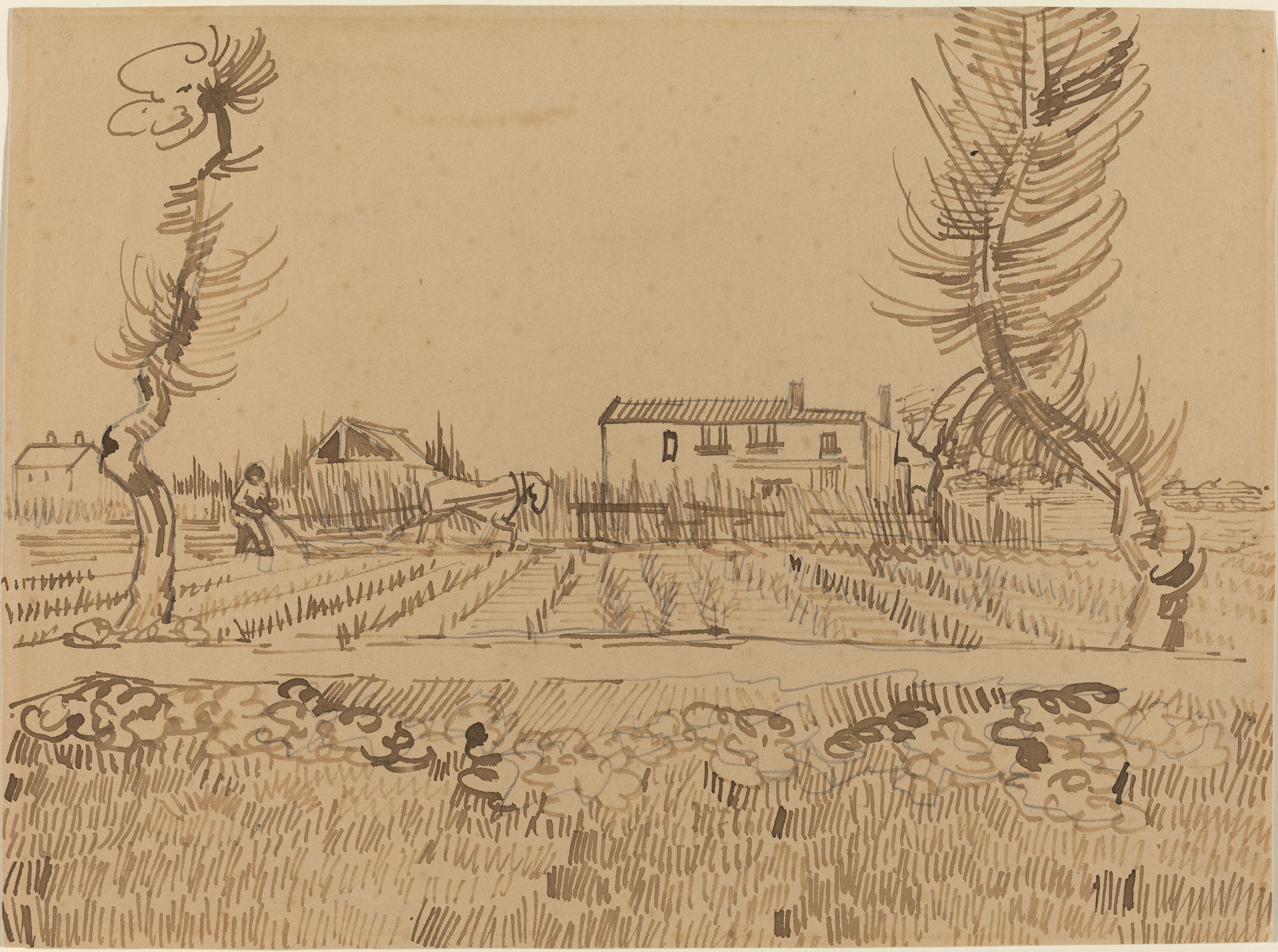
Ploughman in the Fields near Arles (1888) by Vincent Van Gogh, National Gallery of Art

- Nicolas Reyes, Gipsy Kings musician.
- Nicholas Breakspear, the English born pope was educated in the town.
- Jacques-Marie d'Amboise (1538-1611), French hellenist
- Gerson ben Solomon Catalan, 13th century Hebrew encyclopedist and scientist
- Kalonymus ben Kalonymus (1286-1328), Jewish scholar and philosopher, Arles born, active during the Middle Ages.
- Ismaël Bennacer (1997-), footballer
- Jenny Berthelius (1923-2019), Swedish crime novelist and children's writer, lived in Arles
- Saint Caesarius of Arles, bishop who lived from the late 5th to the mid 6th century, known for prophecy and writings that would later be used by theologians such as St. Thomas Aquinas
- Jeanne Calment (1875–1997), the oldest human being whose age is documented, was born, lived, died (aged 122 years and 164 days) and was buried, in Arles
- Djibril Cissé (1981-), footballer
- Lucien Clergue (1934-2014), photographer
- Anne-Marie David, singer (Eurovision winner in 1973)
- The medieval writer Antoine de la Sale was probably born in Arles around 1386
- Antoine de Seguiran, 18th-century encyclopédiste
- Blessed Jean Marie du Lau, last Archbishop of Arles, killed by the revolutionary mob in Paris on 2 September 1792
- Laure Favre-Kahn (born 1976), classical pianist
- Home of the Gipsy Kings, a music group from Arles
- Gaël Givet (born 1981), footballer
- Serhou Guirassy (born 1996), footballer
- Genesius of Arles, a notary martyred under Maximianus in 303 or 308
- Luc Hoffmann, ornithologist, conservationist and philanthropist.
- Maja Hoffmann, art patron
- Samuel ibn Tibbon, Jewish translator and scholar during the Middle Ages.
- Juan Bautista (real name Jean-Baptiste Jalabert), matador
- Christian Lacroix (born 1951), fashion designer
- The Provençal poet Frédéric Mistral (1830–1914) was born near Arles
- Lloyd Palun (born 1988), footballer
- Hugh Prince, Indian Army and British Army officer
- Fanny Valette (born 1986), actress
- Vincent van Gogh, lived here from February 1888 until May 1889.
- Favorinus

== Twin towns – sister cities ==
Arles is twinned with:

- Fulda, Germany
- Jerez de la Frontera, Spain
- Kalymnos, Greece
- Pskov, Russia
- Sagne, Mauritania
- Vercelli, Italy
- Verviers, Belgium
- Wisbech, England, United Kingdom
- York, United States
- George Town, Malaysia

== In pop-culture ==
- The colosseum in Arles was the setting for a tense series of scenes in the film Ronin (1998).
- Arles is the location for the famous Vincent Van-Gogh painting; 'Cafe Terrace at Night'.

== See also ==
- Communes of the Bouches-du-Rhône department
- Roman Catholic Archdiocese of Arles
- L'Arlésienne ("Woman of Arles")
- Langlois Bridge
- Montmajour Abbey
- Saint-Césaire Convent
- Trinquetaille
- Venus of Arles

== General bibliography ==
- This article incorporates text from a publication now in the public domain: Herbermann, Charles, ed. (1913). "Archdiocese of Aix". Catholic Encyclopedia. New York: Robert Appleton Company.
- Delamarre, Xavier (2003). Dictionnaire de la langue gauloise: Une approche linguistique du vieux-celtique continental. Errance. ISBN 9782877723695.
- Lewis, Archibal R. (1965). The Development of Southern French and Catalan Society, 718-1050. University of Texas Press.
- Nègre, Ernest (1990). Toponymie générale de la France. Librairie Droz. ISBN 978-2-600-02883-7.
