= Hôtel de Ville, Arles =

Town hall in Arles, France

Hôtel de Ville
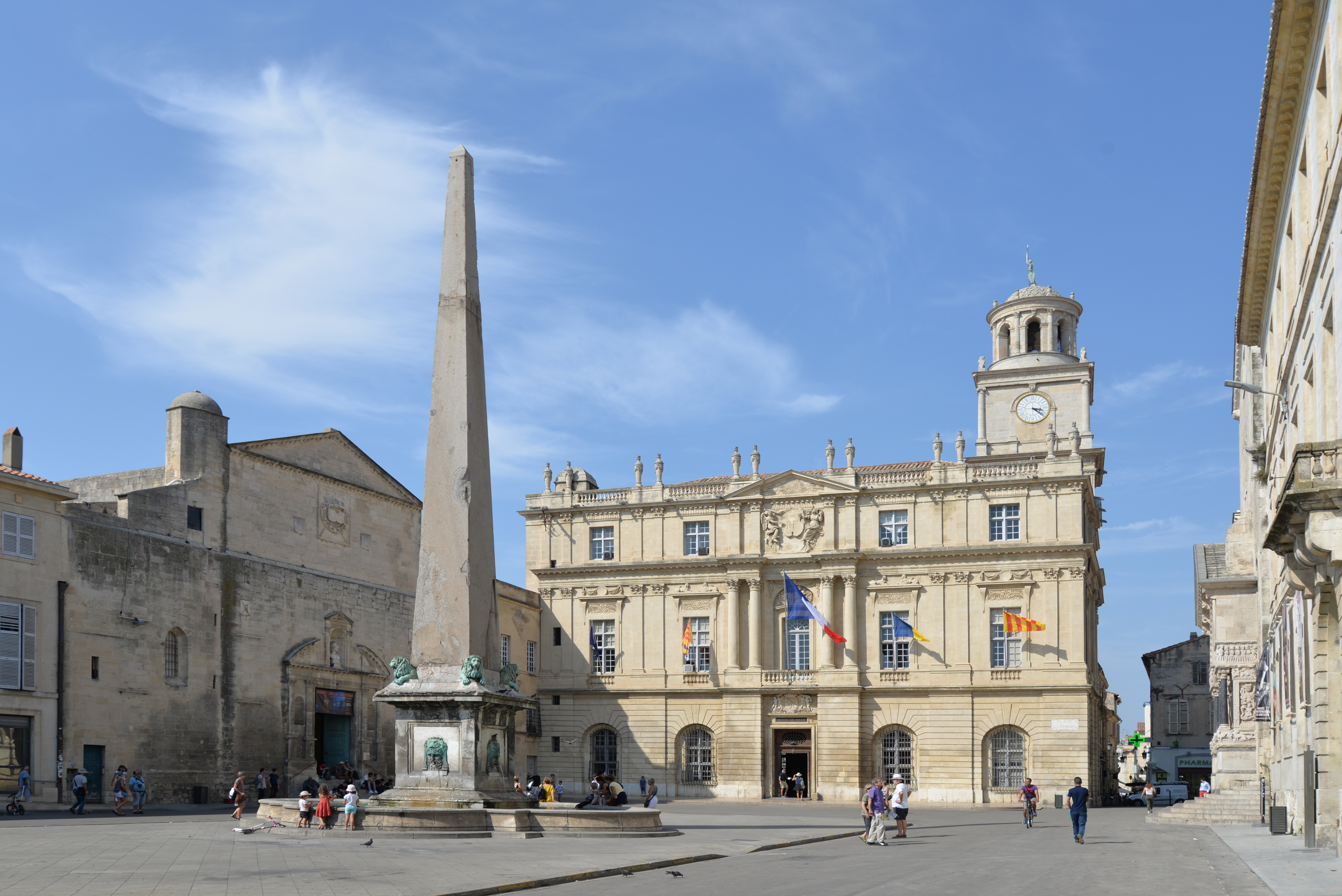
- The main frontage of the Hôtel de Ville in September 2016

General information
- Type: City hall
- Architectural style: Neoclassical style
- Location: Arles, France
- Coordinates: 43.6768°N 4.6276°E
- Completed: 1676

Design and construction
- Architects: Jacques Peytret and Jules Hardouin-Mansart

Monument historique
- Official name: Hôtel de ville
- Type: Inscrit
- Designated: 1920
- Reference no.: PA00081155

The Hôtel de Ville (French pronunciation: [otɛl də vil], City Hall; Occitan: Ostal de Vila) is a municipal building in Arles, Bouches-du-Rhône, southern France, standing on Place de la République. It was designated a monument historique by the French government in 1920.

== History ==
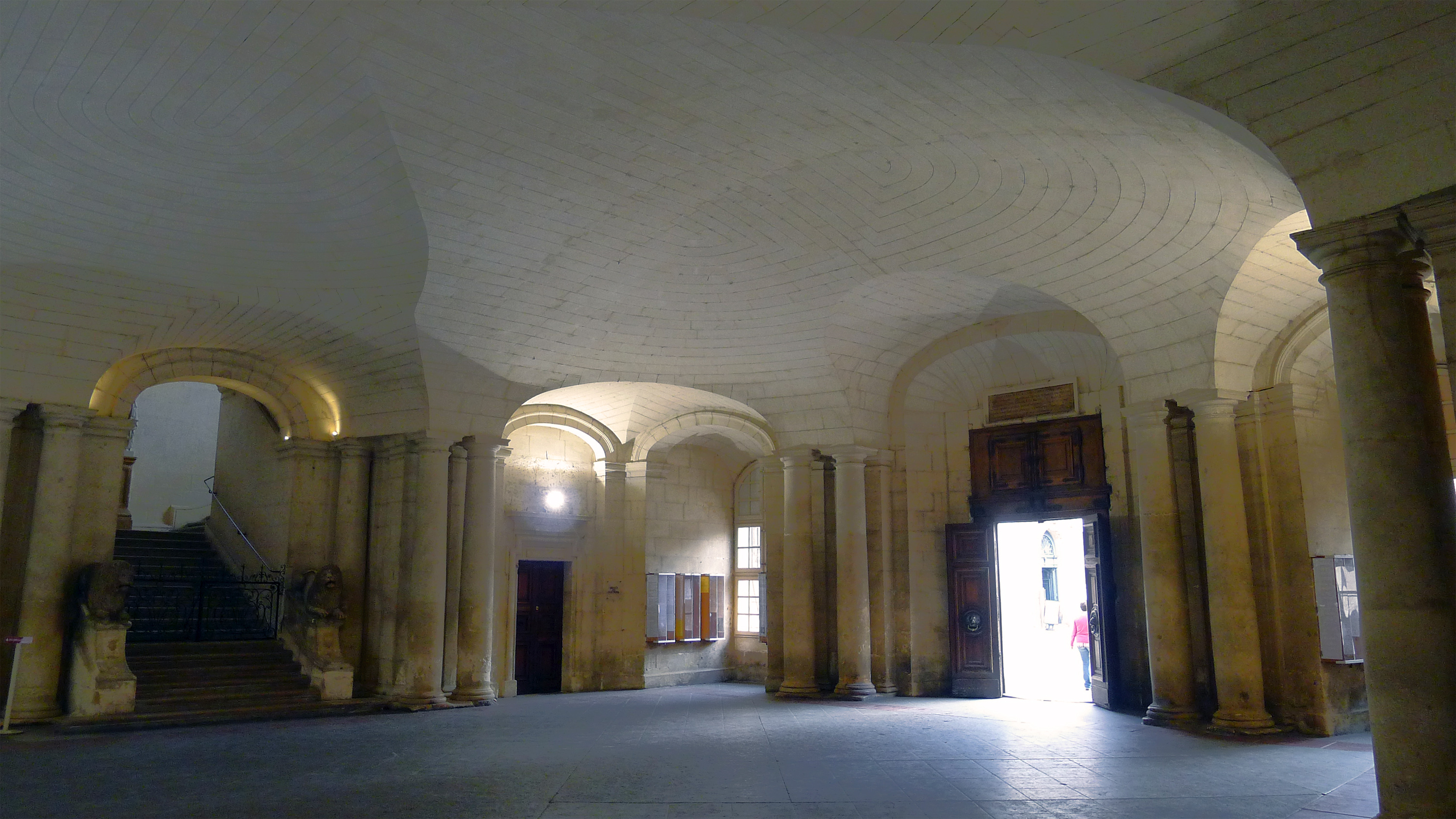
The vestibule

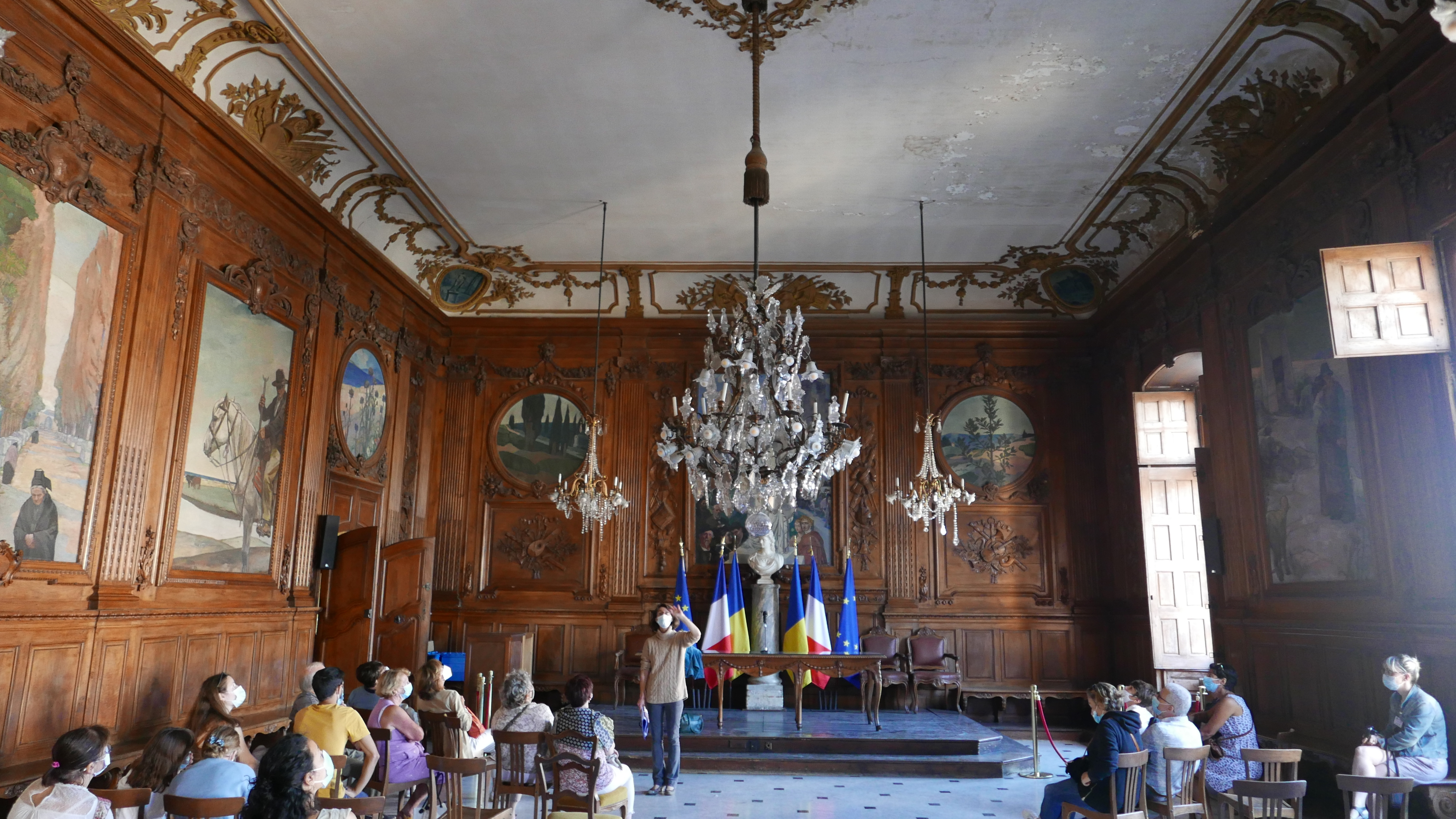
The council chamber

The first town hall in Arles was a medieval building, between to the Palais des Podestats on the Plan de La Cour, and the clock tower, which dated back to the early 16th century. The clock tower itself was surmounted by a bronze statue of the god, Mars, which was cast by Laurent Vincent of Avignon in 1515.

By the mid-17th century, the old building was dilapidated and, in 1657, the aldermen decided to demolish it and to replace it with a more substantial building. The masterplan for the site involved erecting a 4th-century Roman obelisk, known as the Obélisque d'Arles, in the square in front of the proposed town hall.

Construction of the new building started on 10 June 1673. It was designed Jacques Peytret, with technical input from the Parisian architect, Jules Hardouin-Mansart, built by Claude Roux and Charles Troutin in ashlar stone at a cost of 40,000 French livres, and was officially opened on 22 March 1676.

The design involved a symmetrical main frontage of five bays facing onto the main square (now Place de la République). The old clock tower was retained from the old complex and incorporated in the northeast corner of the new building, thereby affecting the symmetry when viewed from a distance. The ground floor of the new building was rusticated. The central bay featured a square headed doorway with a moulded surround; on the first floor, there was a round headed window with a balcony, flanked by pairs of Corinthian order columns supporting a modillioned cornice; on the second floor there was a coat of arms, flanked by pairs of Corinthian order pilasters supporting a triangular pediment with a carving of a sun, the symbol of Louis XIV, in the tympanum. The other bays were fenestrated with round headed windows on the ground floor, with square headed windows with cornices on the first floor, and with cross-windows on the second floor. The bays were flanked by Corinthian order pilasters supporting a balustraded parapet supporting a series of urns. Internally, the principal rooms were the Salle du Conseil (council chamber) on the first floor and the vestibule on the ground floor.

The grand staircase leading to the council chamber was flanked by statues of lions and originally featured a fine marble statue, known as the Venus of Arles, which dated from the 1st century BC and was discovered in the Roman Theatre of Arles in 1651. However, it has since been replaced by a replica: the original was placed in the Louvre in Paris. The vestibule was notable for its shallow vaulting, which was conceived by Hardouin-Mansart and which has been described as "le chef-d'œuvre absolu de la stéréotomie française" ("the absolute masterpiece of French stereotomy").

Following the liberation of Arles by French Forces of the Interior (FFI) on 24 August 1944, during the Second World War, the troops of the FFI assembled in front of the town hall.
