= Jenny Berthelius =

Swedish author (1923–2019)

- Born: Jenny Elisabet Berthelius; 29 September 1923; Stockholm, Sweden
- Died: 8 June 2019 (aged 95); Arles, France
- Education: Lund University
- Occupations: crime novelist and children's writer
- Known for: 24 crime novels, and 28 children's books
- Spouse: Sven Berthelius (m. 1944–1970)
- Children: 1 daughter

Jenny Elisabet Berthelius (29 September 1923 – 8 June 2019) was a Swedish crime novelist and children's writer, who wrote 24 crime novels, as well as 28 children's books.

== Early life ==
Berthelius was born in Stockholm, on 29 September 1923, the daughter of an office manager father and a mother who was a singer and reciter. Berthelius was educated at a girls school in Helsingborg, completed in 1940, and passed her upper secondary school leaving examination in 1942. From 1978 to 1982, Berthelius studied comparative literature at Lund University.

== Career ==
Berthelius first worked as a secretary, and later worked as a translator and freelance writer, although she is best known for her detective novels. In 1968, Berthelius published her debut novel, Mördarens ansikte (The Killer's Face), followed by one new detective novel every year for the next twenty years. In 2007, Berthelius published her first new detective novel for fifteen years, Näckrosen. Berthelius's earliest novels are traditional whodunnits, and in later works from 1972 onwards, she moved onto more psychological themes. Her two main protagonists are Inspector Singer and the novelist Vera Kruse. Berthelius wrote 24 crime novels and 28 children's books.

== Awards ==
In 1969, Berthelius was awarded the newspaper Expressen's prize for the best Swedish detective novel. In 2004, Berthelius was awarded the Svenska Deckarakademins Grand Master-diplom.

== Personal life ==
In 1944, she married Sven Berthelius (died 1970), and they had a daughter together. Berthelius died in June 2019.
