= Antoine de Seguiran =

Antoine de Seguiran, called chevalier de Seguiran, was an 18th-century French soldier and encyclopédiste. De Seguiran was from a military family from Arles. In October 1766, he married Pauline Le Breton, a former fiancée to Beaumarchais.

Chevalier de Seguiran wrote two articles for the Encyclopédie by Diderot and D'Alembert: Vérité (truth) and Vertu. Diderot added the sensualist point of view on the latter.

== Bibliography ==
- Frank Arthur Kafker, The Encyclopedists as individuals: a biographical dictionary of the authors of the Encyclopédie, Oxford, Studies on Voltaire and the eighteenth Century, 1988, (p. 359). ISBN 0-7294-0368-8
- Charles, Sébastien: Berkeley Au Siècle Des Lumières: Immatérialisme Et Scepticisme Au XVIIIe Siècle. Bibliothèque D'Histoire De La Philosophie. Librairie Philosophique J. Vrin (2003) ISBN 2-7116-1602-9 S.155
