= Laure Favre-Kahn =

French classical pianist (born 1976)

Laure Favre-Kahn (born 24 October 1976) is a French classical pianist.

== Biography ==
Born in Arles, it was her father, an amateur pianist, who introduced her to the piano at the age of four. She took classes at the Avignon Conservatory before entering the Conservatoire de Paris in 1991.

She studied in Bruno Rigutto's class and won a first prize in 1993.
