= Jacques-Marie d'Amboise =

French hellenist

Jacques-Marie d'Amboise, born at Arles in 1538 and died in November 1611, was a French hellenist, known in his time under the name of "maître Marius."

== Biography ==
After pursuing his studies in Paris, he travelled to Spain, Italy and Sicily. On his return to France after teaching in Italy, he was appointed reader of the king and professor of rhetoric and philosophy at the Collège Sainte-Barbe, where he was rector in 1576 and where he continued to teach until 1578. He also held the position of Chair of Greek and Latin Philosophy at the Collège royal from 1576.

== Works ==
- 1576. De publico docendi munere sibi a Rege delato Oratio (Speech on the state teaching position conferred on him by the king) Online text
- 1586. De rebus creatis et eorum creatore liber tripertitus (Three part book on Creation and its Creator) Online text
- 1594. Orationes duae in Senatu habitae, pro universis academiae ordinibus, in Claro-montenses, qui de Jesuiteas dicunt (Two speeches delivered in the Senate before all ranks of the academy at Clarmont, which talk about Jesuits) Online text
- 1598. Oratio de virtute dicendi, habita in regio auditorio Cameracensi (Speech on the virtue of speaking, delivered in the royal lecture hall at Cambrai)

== Sources ==
- Biographic : Jules Quicherat, Histoire de Sainte-Barbe, collège, communauté, institution, Hachette, Paris, vol. II, 1862, pp. 95–97.
- Bibliographic : Bibliothèque nationale de France.
