= Venus of Arles =

Sculpture of Venus at Musée du Louvre

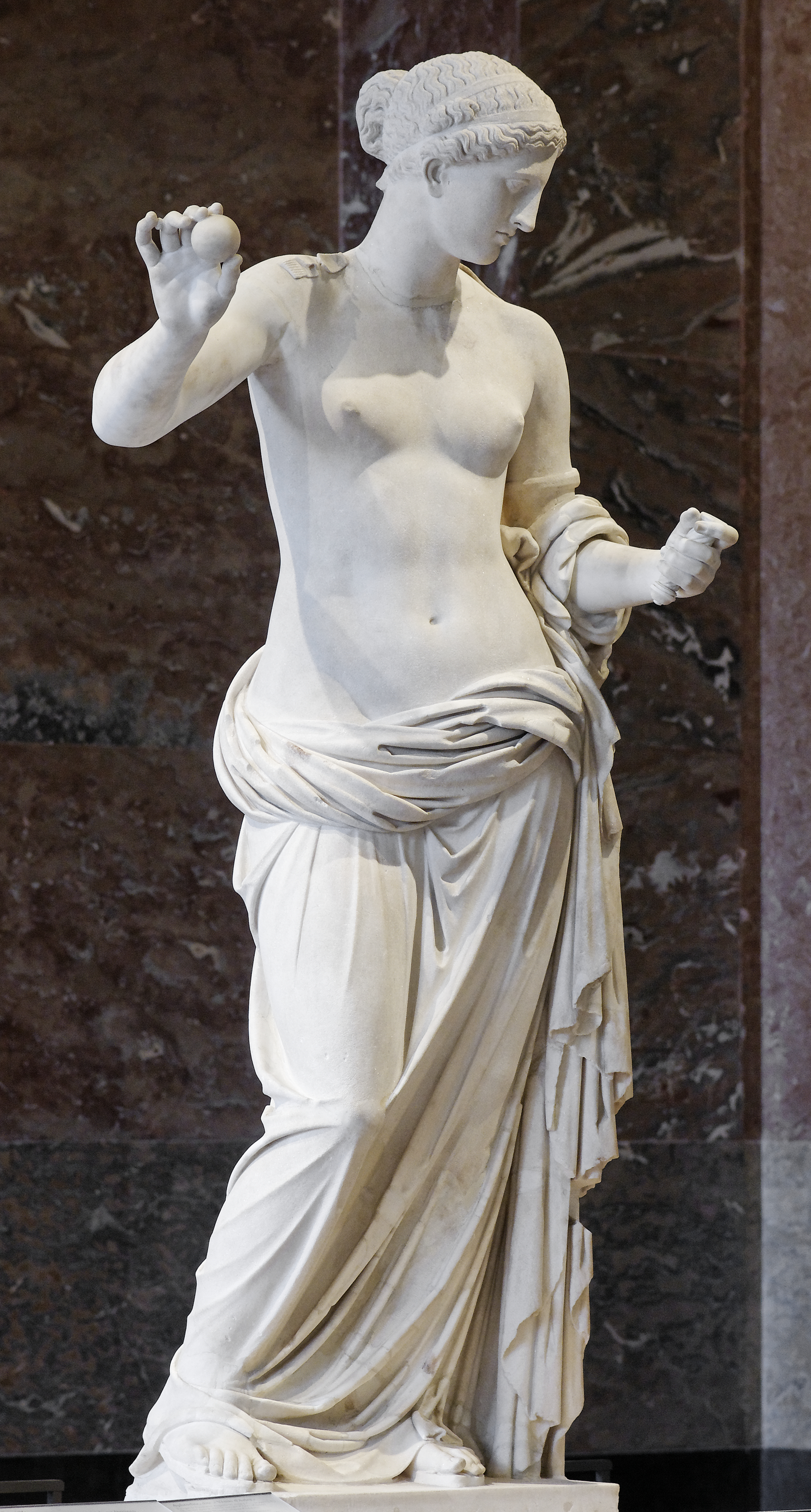
- Year: 1st century BCE (Julian)
- Dimensions: 1.94 m (6.4 ft) × 102 cm (40 in) × 65 cm (26 in)
- Location: Salle 344 - Classical and Hellenistic Greek art

The Venus of Arles is a 1.94-metre-high (6.4 ft) sculpture of Venus at the Musée du Louvre. It is in Hymettus marble and dates to the end of the 1st century BC.

== History ==
It may be a copy of the Aphrodite of Thespiae by Praxiteles, ordered by the courtesan Phryne. In the 2nd century AD, Pausanias mentioned the existence at Thespiae in Boeotia (central Greece) of a group made up of Cupid, Phryne and Aphrodite. The Praxitelean style may be detected in the head's resemblance to that of the Cnidian Aphrodite, a work of Praxiteles known through copies. In a tentative attempt to reconstruct his career, the original Aphrodite of Thespiae would be a work from his youth in the 360s BC, and this partially draped female (frequently repeated in the Hellenistic era, such as the Venus de Milo) is a prelude to his fully naked c. 350 BC Cnidian Aphrodite.

The Venus of Arles was discovered in several pieces at the Roman Theatre of Arles. The sculptural program at Arles was executed in Italy, perhaps by Greek artisans. Venus was the divine ancestor of the gens Julia; Arles, which had backed Caesar when Massilia backed Pompey was rewarded in numerous ways. A semi-nude heroic statue of Augustus was the dominating figure in the sculptural program of the Arles theatre.

The Venus was found in 1651, by workmen who were digging a well. The head appeared first, at a depth of six feet, which spurred further excavations. Later, after it had been given in 1681 to Louis XIV to decorate the Galerie des Glaces of Versailles, further excavations were made in the area of the theatre's scenae frons, but no further fragments were found. The statue was seized from the royal collection at the Revolution and has been at the Musée du Louvre ever since its inception. A copy is on display in the Hôtel de Ville in Arles.

== Description ==
When restoring the sculpture, the royal sculptor François Girardon added the apple in the right hand – as won in the Judgement of Paris – and the mirror in the left, to make the sculpture more closely resemble a Venus. The discovery in 1911 of a cast made of the sculpture as it had first been restored only sufficiently to reassemble, before Girardon was commissioned to improve it, demonstrated the extent of Girardon's transformative restorations, which included refinishing the surfaces, slimming the figure in the process. That the result is as much Girardon as Greco-Roman keeps the sculpture in the storerooms of the Louvre. The head, though its broken edges do not directly join with the torso except for one point of contact, belongs with the body – an important point, since it is the only sculpture of this particular model that retains its head, and the head is Praxitelean, comparable to his Aphrodite of Cnidus. The bracelet on her left arm, however, is original, an identifying trait of the goddess as seen on the Cnidian Aphrodite.

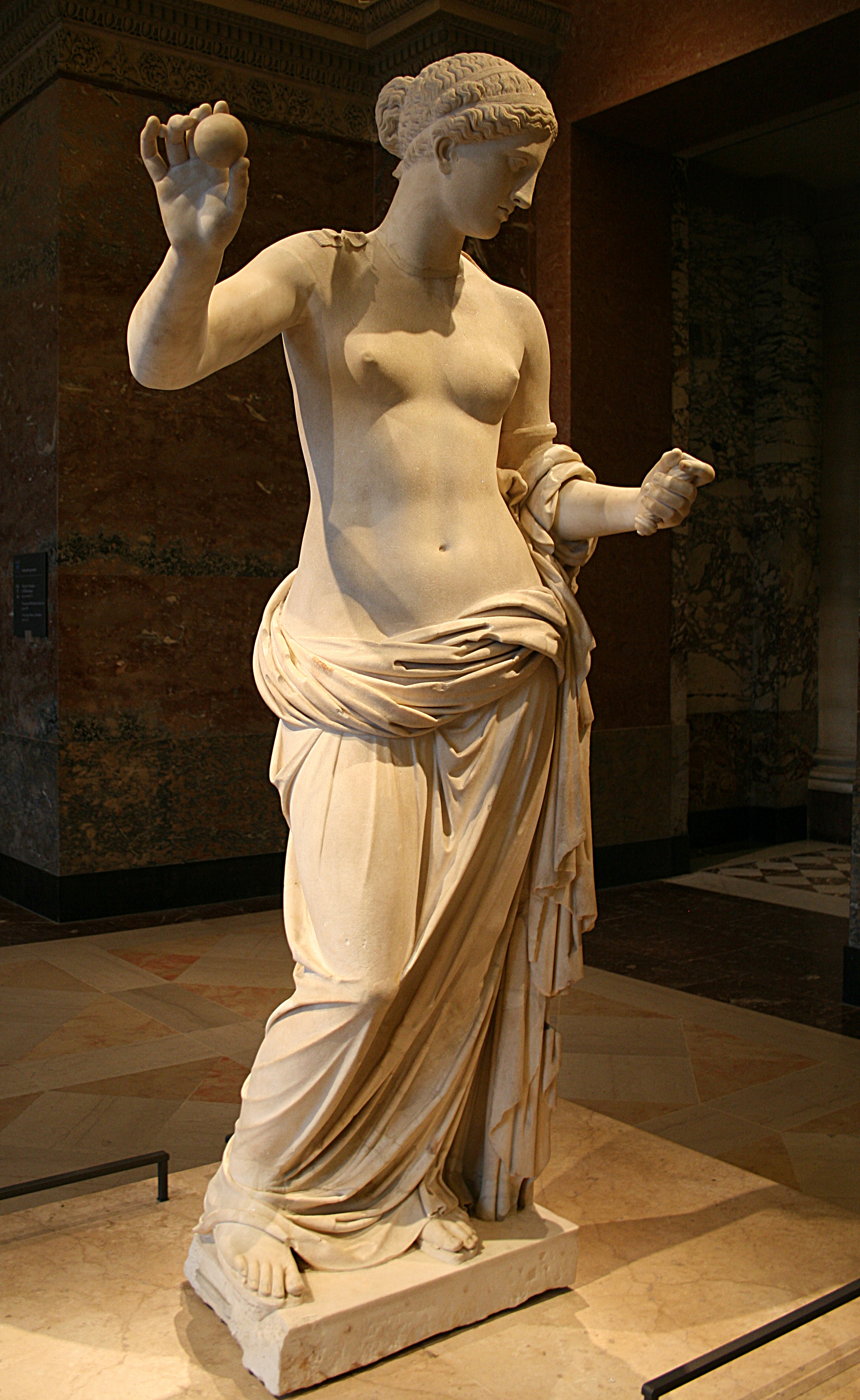
The Venus of Arles

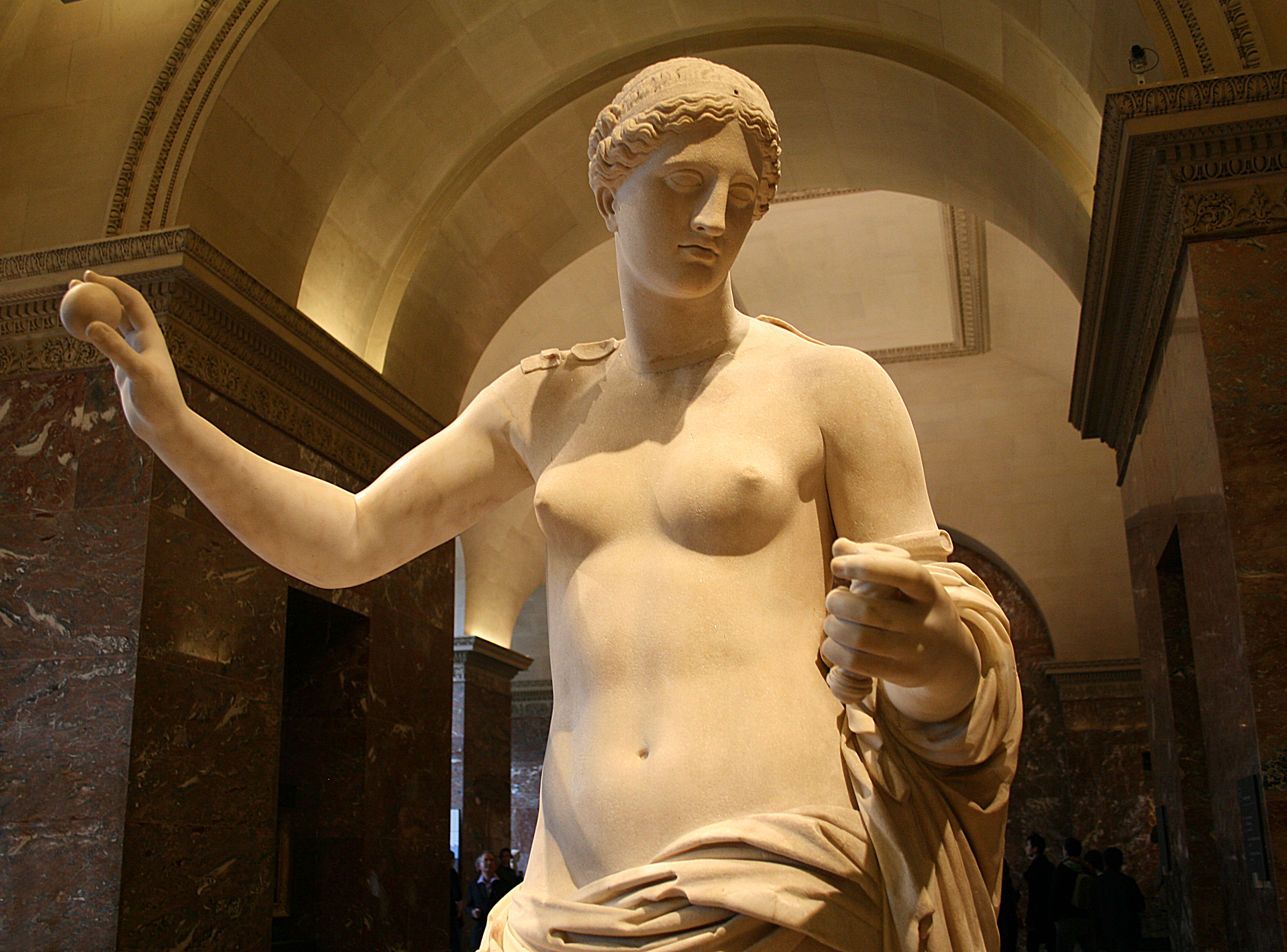
Restored surface on the Praxitelean figure by François Girardon

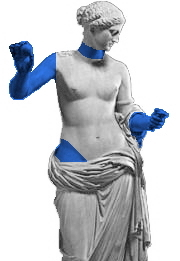
Restorations highlighted in blue

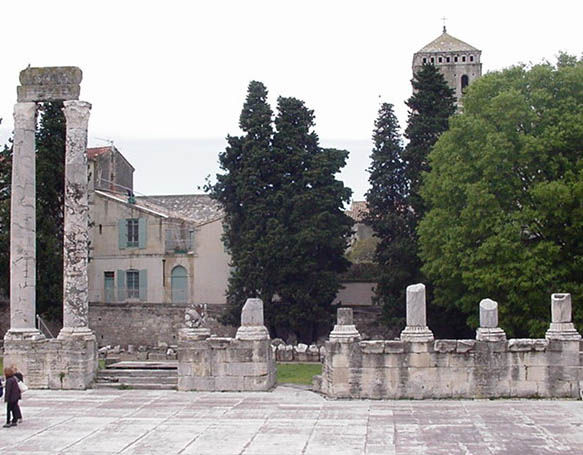
The Theatre, the statue's findspot
