= Arles, Roman and Romanesque Monuments =

UNESCO World Heritage Site
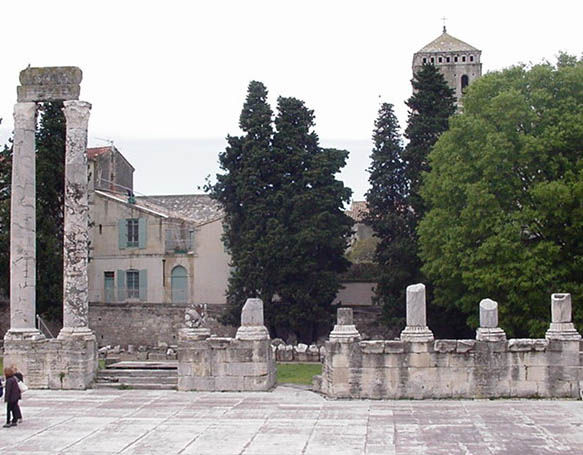
- Ruins at the Roman theater

- Location within France
- Location: Arles, France
- Includes: Alyscamps; Amphitheatre; Gallo-Roman theatre; Forum; Thermae of Constantine; Church of St. Trophime
- Criteria: Cultural: (ii), (iv)
- Reference: 164
- Inscription: 1981 (5th Session)
- Area: 65 ha (160 acres)
- Coordinates: 43°40′39.5″N 4°37′50.5″E

Arles, Roman and Romanesque Monuments (French: Arles, monuments romains et romans) is an area containing a collection of monuments in the city centre of Arles, France, that has been listed as a UNESCO World Heritage Site since 1981.

The official brief description for this as a World Heritage Site is:

Arles is a good example of the adaptation of an ancient city to medieval European civilization. It has some impressive Roman monuments, of which the earliest—the arena, the Roman theatre and the cryptoporticus (subterranean galleries)—date back to the 1st century B.C. During the 4th century Arles experienced a second golden age, as attested by the baths of Constantine and the necropolis of Alyscamps. In the 11th and 12th centuries, Arles once again became one of the most attractive cities in the Mediterranean. Within the city walls, Saint-Trophime, with its cloister, is one of Provence's major Romanesque monuments.

The protected area covers 65 hectares (160 acres). The following buildings are located within this area:

- Arles Amphitheatre
- The Roman theater
- Cryptoporticus and Roman forum: Located underneath the Chapel of the Jesuit College and the City Hall, this cryptoporticus was likely built by the Greeks in the 1st century BCE. It may have been used as a slave barracks.
- The Thermes of Constantine: A public bath, which was built during the 4th century CE.
- Ramparts of the Roman castrum
- The Alyscamps
- The Church of St. Trophime and its cloister
- Roman exedra (courtyard of Museon Arlaten)
