= Roman Theatre of Arles =

Ancient Roman theater in Arles, France

Coordinates: 43.676389°N 4.629722°E

UNESCO World Heritage Site
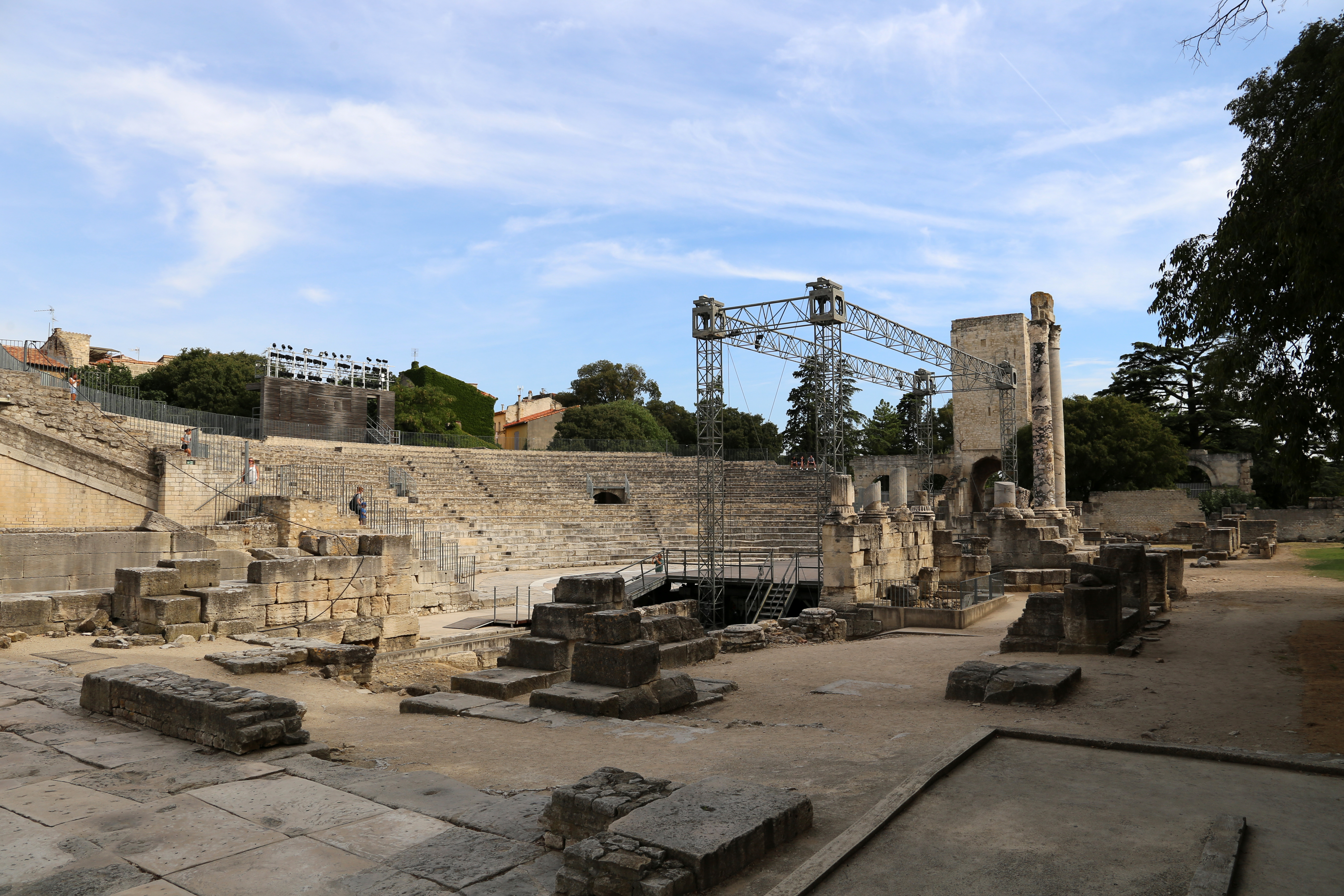
- The Roman Theatre in Arles

- Location within France
- Location: Arles, France
- Part of: Arles, Roman and Romanesque Monuments
- Criteria: Cultural: (ii), (iv)
- Reference: 164
- Inscription: 1981 (5th Session)
- Area: 65 ha (0.25 sq mi)

The Roman Theatre of Arles (Occitan: Teatre Romàn de Arle) is a 1st-century Roman theatre, built during the reign of Caesar Augustus. It is located next to the Arles Amphitheatre in the city of Arles, Provence, France. Along with the other Roman and medieval buildings in Arles, the theatre was listed on the UNESCO World Heritage List as part of the Arles, Roman and Romanesque Monuments site for their testimony to the ancient history of the city.

In Roman times, the theatre had 33 rows of steps and could seat 8,000 people. It was as large as the Roman Theatre of Orange, although much less well-preserved.

During the Middle Ages, the theatre was used as a quarry, with the stone pillaged to build the city wall and other buildings. Today, only the stage area, orchestra section, seating rows, and two columns survive.

The Venus of Arles, a famous Roman statue made of marble, was found in pieces at the Roman theatre in 1651.

== See also ==
- List of Roman theatres
