= French Civil Protection =

national federation of civil protection
- Fédération Nationale de Protection Civile
- Formation: December 14, 1965
- Legal status: Voluntary association
- Purpose: First aid, Humanitarian Aid
- Headquarters: Asnières-sur-Seine, France
- Region served: France
- President: François Richez
- Volunteers: 32,000
- Website: www.protection-civile.org

The national federation of civil protection (French: fédération nationale de protection civile), or the FNPC, is a French humanitarian and first aid voluntary association.

Its logo, a blue triangle on white and orange ground, comes from the international distinctive sign of civil defence, which is a protective sign under the protection of the four Geneva Conventions of 1949.

This voluntary association is not to be confused with the French Sécurité Civile, which is a government agency, and is only one of the many French civil protection associations.

== History ==
=== From Civil Defense to Civil Protection ===
At the end of World War I, the high number of civilian casualties highlighted the need to upgrade the protection of people during conflicts.

In 1933, the first voluntary organization to protect civilians during war time was founded with the support of Gaston Doumergue (UNDA : UNION NATIONALE POUR LA DEFENSE AERIENNE ET POUR LA PROTECTION DES POPULATIONS CIVILES). In 1938, at the dawn of World War II, the French government developed civil defense (défense passive) policies. Their goal was to build blast shelters and warning networks to keep people safe from airstrikes, the UNDA become COMITE NATIONAL DE DEFENSE AERIENNE ET DE SAUVETAGE PUBLIC.

After the war, the défense passive missions became more and more related to non military threats like natural disasters. The 27 of January 1950, the UNPC (UNION NATIONALE DE PROTECTION CIVILE), is born.

In 1951, a national service for civil protection in the ministry of the Interior was established. This government agency then became the French Sécurité Civile in 1975.

However, this nationalization did not hamper volunteering which developed through local civil protection societies from 1958.

=== Local societies and the national federation ===
In 1965, there were local civil protection societies in 26 departments. Following a call from Prime minister Georges Pompidou, the national federation of civil protection (Fédération nationale de protection civile) was constituted on December 14, 1965, in Paris, in order to manage these local societies and to raise popular awareness on civil defense. The first federal president was Léon Robine.

In 1968, there were local societies in 54 departments and 31,701 volunteers. One year later, a decree entitled the French Civil Protection as an association acting in the public interest.

During the 1980s, the Civil Protection became the society which delivered the second highest number of first aid trainings in France. Its volunteers also led awareness campaigns on several topics such as first aid, domestic accidents, HIV and road safety.

In the early 1990s, the national federation of civil protection was unifying 94 local civil protection associations, but also other societies like the French White Cross, the RATP first aid society or the national civil defense amateur radio society. Since 1993, the French Civil Protection is entitled to deliver official first aid training and certifications.

=== Mission broadening ===
From 1991 to 2009, Louis Lareng, the founder of the French emergency medical service, was elected president of the national federation of civil protection. Under his guidance, the scope of civil defense societies widened from their traditional first aid stations missions to disaster response and emergency response. Since then, the French civil protection has developed civil defense partnerships with national and local authorities.

=== Presidents ===
- 1965–1969: Léon Robine
- 1969–1978: Lucien Leprestre
- 1978–1980: Jean Perreau Pradier
- 1980–1985: Guy Bonneterre
- 1985–1991: Ida Guinot
- 1991–2009: Louis Lareng
- 2009–2012: Yannick Chenevard
- 2012–2015: Christian Wax
- 2015–2019: Paul Francheterre
- Since 2019: François Richez

== Current organization ==
The French Civil Protection is a voluntary association acting in the public interest, with a government certification to carry civil defense missions. In 2018, there were 32,000 volunteers acting in more than 500 local societies spread into 97 departments. The federation is led by a board of directors with 24 members and by François Richez who has been the federal president since 2019.

=== National level ===
The national federation is the organization in charge of managing the 97 societies spread in metropolitan and overseas departments. Headquarters are located in Asnières-sur-Seine.

=== Departmental and local levels ===
In each department, there can only be one association labeled by the national federation as a "departmental association of civil protection" (association départementale de protection civile, or ADPC). Each departmental association is in charge of one or several local societies (antennes) which are the operational units of the organization.

For historical reasons, there is only one departmental association for the departments of Paris, Seine-Saint-Denis and Val-de-Marne.

In overseas territories, departmental associations can have different names, like the Polynesian federation of civil protection (fédération polynésienne de protection civile) from French Polynesia. However, their organization is the same as in Metropolitan France.

The French Civil Protection has no local association in some departments like Ardennes, Corse-du-Sud, Haute-Corse, Haute-Loire, Eure, Lozère or French Guiana.

=== Protection Civile Paris Seine ===
The Protection Civile Paris Seine (PCPS) is the departmental association for Paris, Hauts-de-Seine, Seine-Saint-Denis and Val-de-Marne. Its history and status are specific.

Until 1998, the Paris Police Prefecture was hiring temporary and volunteer rescuers in the interdepartmental civil protection service (service interdépartemental de protection civile). Their missions included emergency response for the Paris Fire Brigade. Then the service was disbanded and replaced by the Civil Protection of Paris, a local society managed by the National Federation of Civil Protection. It was then renamed Protection Civile Paris Seine.

There are 2000 volunteers in 41 local societies (Centre, 5e, 6e, 8e, 10e, 11e, 12e, 13e, 14e, 15e, 16e, 17e, 18e, 19e, 20e, Asnières, Aubervilliers, Boulogne-Billancourt, Bourg-La-Reine, Charenton, Clichy-sous-Bois, Colombes, Courbevoie, Creteil, Garches, Gennevilliers, Levallois-Perret, Nanterre, Pantin, Montreuil, Montrouge, Vincennes, Gentilly, Orly, Reuil-Malmaison, Suresnes, Vanves, Villeuve-la-Garenne), operating a fleet of 46 ambulances, 17 boats, 60 light vehicles, 10 logistic vehicles and 1 mobile headquarters vehicle.

== Missions ==
The French Civil protection has a government certification to carry 4 types of missions:

- first aid stations management;
- first aid training;
- humanitarian and social support;
- emergency and disaster response.

=== First aid stations ===
Provisional first aid stations (dispositifs prévisionnels de secours) are established during cultural, political or sportive events to provide medical first response to the participants. In 2016, the French Civil Protection carried 18,200 first aid stations.

There are different configurations to adapt to the scale of the event:

1. warning and first aid station: 2 certified first responders;
2. small scale provisional first aid station: 4 to 12 certified first responders;
3. medium scale provisional first aid station: 13 to 36 certified first responders;
4. large scale provisional first aid station: at least 37 certified first responders.

==== Notable first aid stations ====
The list below gives examples of notable first aid stations carried by the French Civil Protection:

- The Bayonne Festival;
- The Paris International Marathon;
- The Vieilles Charrues Festival;
- The 2018 FIFA World Cup Final Fan Fest in Paris.

=== First aid training ===
The French Civil Protection delivers public basic first aid training (prévention et secours civiques de niveau 1, or PSC1). The association is also entitled to train its own members to become a certified first responder at the PSE1 and PSE2 levels. Specialized trainings as nautical first aid are also delivered.

In 2016, 2,600 certified trainers from the French Civil Protection trained 110,000 people to first aids.

=== Humanitarian and social support ===
The French Civil Protection is entitled to carry a broad scope of humanitarian and support missions including assistance to the homeless and post-disaster response.

In 1999, the Federation contributed to an international humanitarian operation to support refugees from the Kosovo war by managing the Stenkovec refugee camp in Macedonia.

=== Emergency response ===
The Île-de-France, Bas-Rhin and Nord local societies are entitled to take part in emergency and disaster response missions for the prefectures, the French emergency medical service and the fire services.

==== Notable missions ====
French Civil Protection teams participated in the emergency response after the 1999 MV Erika sinking, the 2001 Toulouse chemical factory explosion and the 2015 Germanwings Flight 9525 crash.

During the November 2015 Paris attacks, 130 first responders contributed to manage the crisis, to evacuate the victims to local hospitals, and to provide first aid to the witnesses.

After the 2016 Nice truck attack, 162 volunteers provided emergency response and psychological first aid to the victims, their relatives and witnesses.

== Equipment ==
=== Vehicles ===
In 2016, the Federation owned a fleet of 1,230 vehicles, including 400 ambulances, light vehicles, boats, mobile headquarters vehicles, off-road vehicles and bicycles. The vehicles are white, with a large orange line on which the Federation logo is displayed and the words "PROTECTION CIVILE" are written in blue. Thin blue lines surround the orange line, except in Paris.

As the French Civil Protection is certified for emergency response missions, its vehicles can be entitled to have blue emergency vehicle lighting and a two-tone siren.

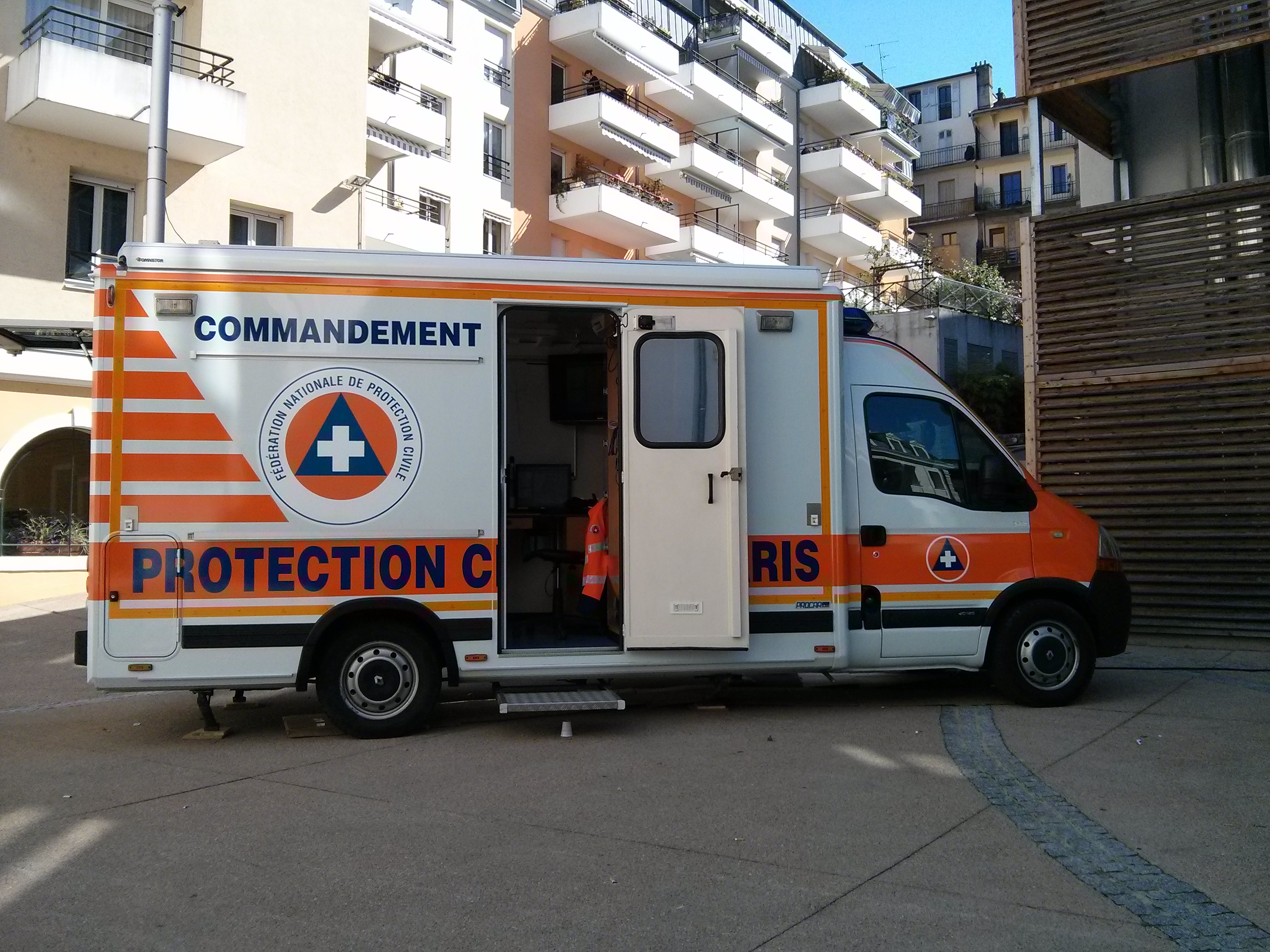
Mobile headquarters vehicle

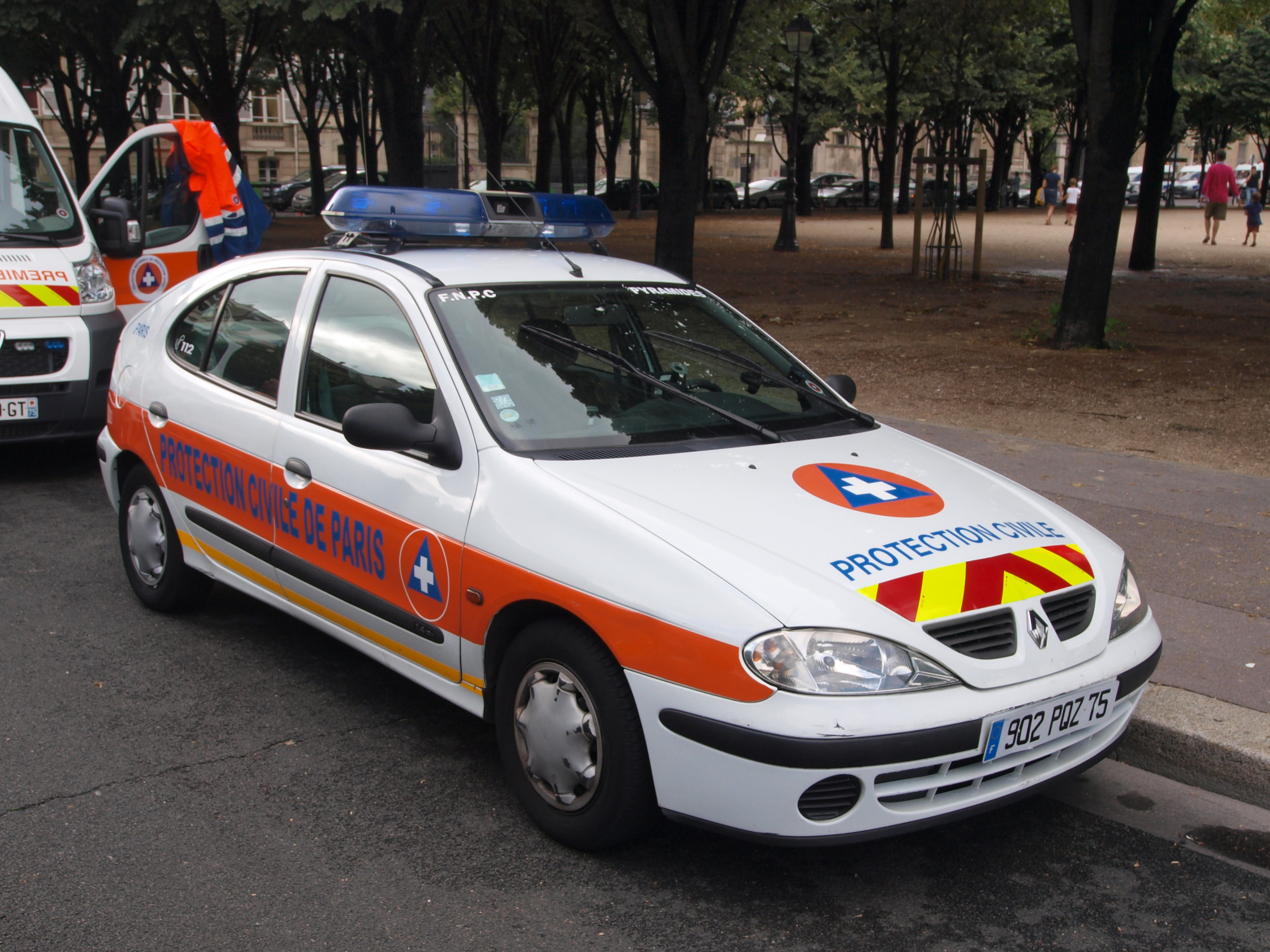
Light vehicle

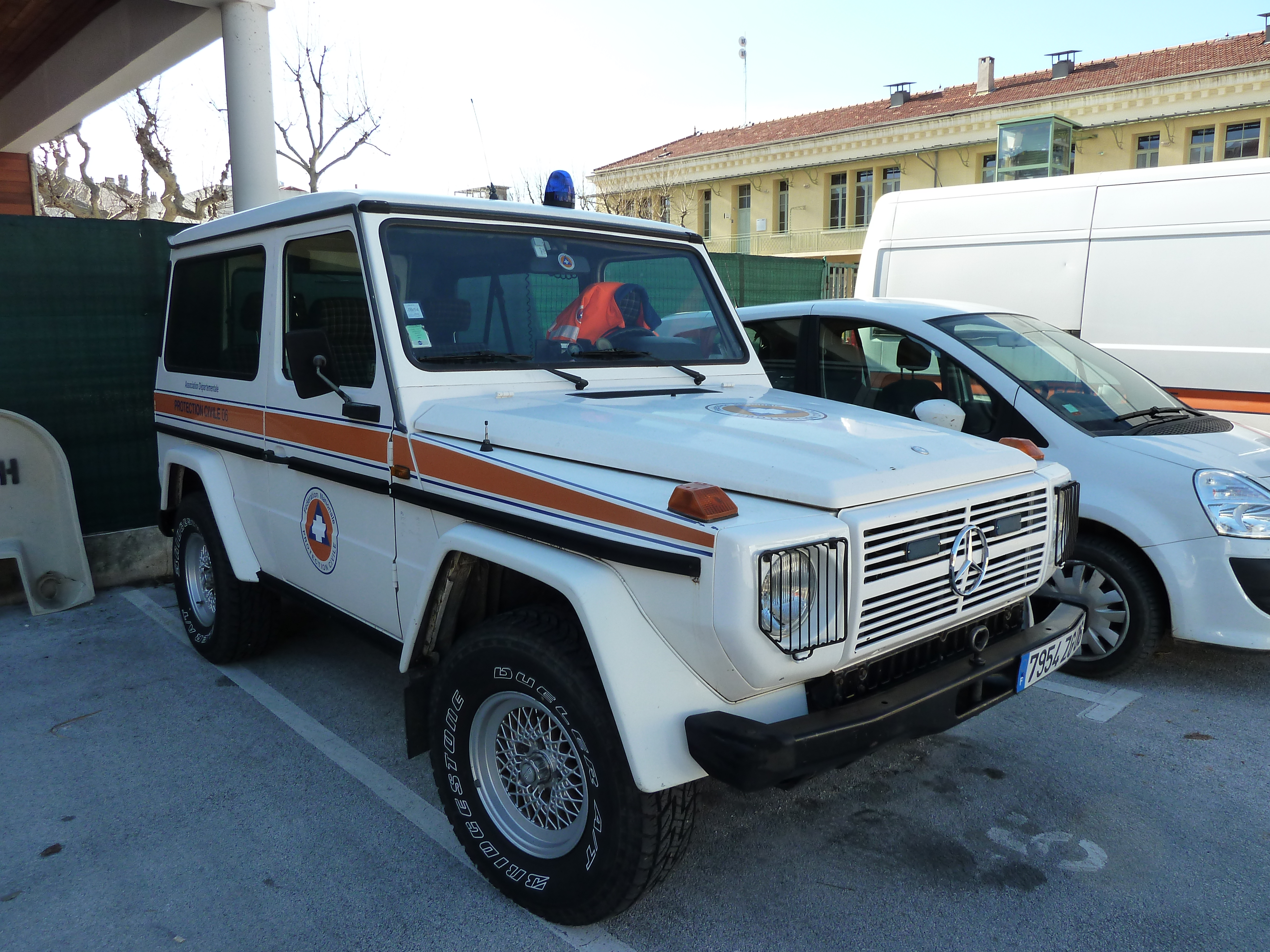
Off-road vehicle

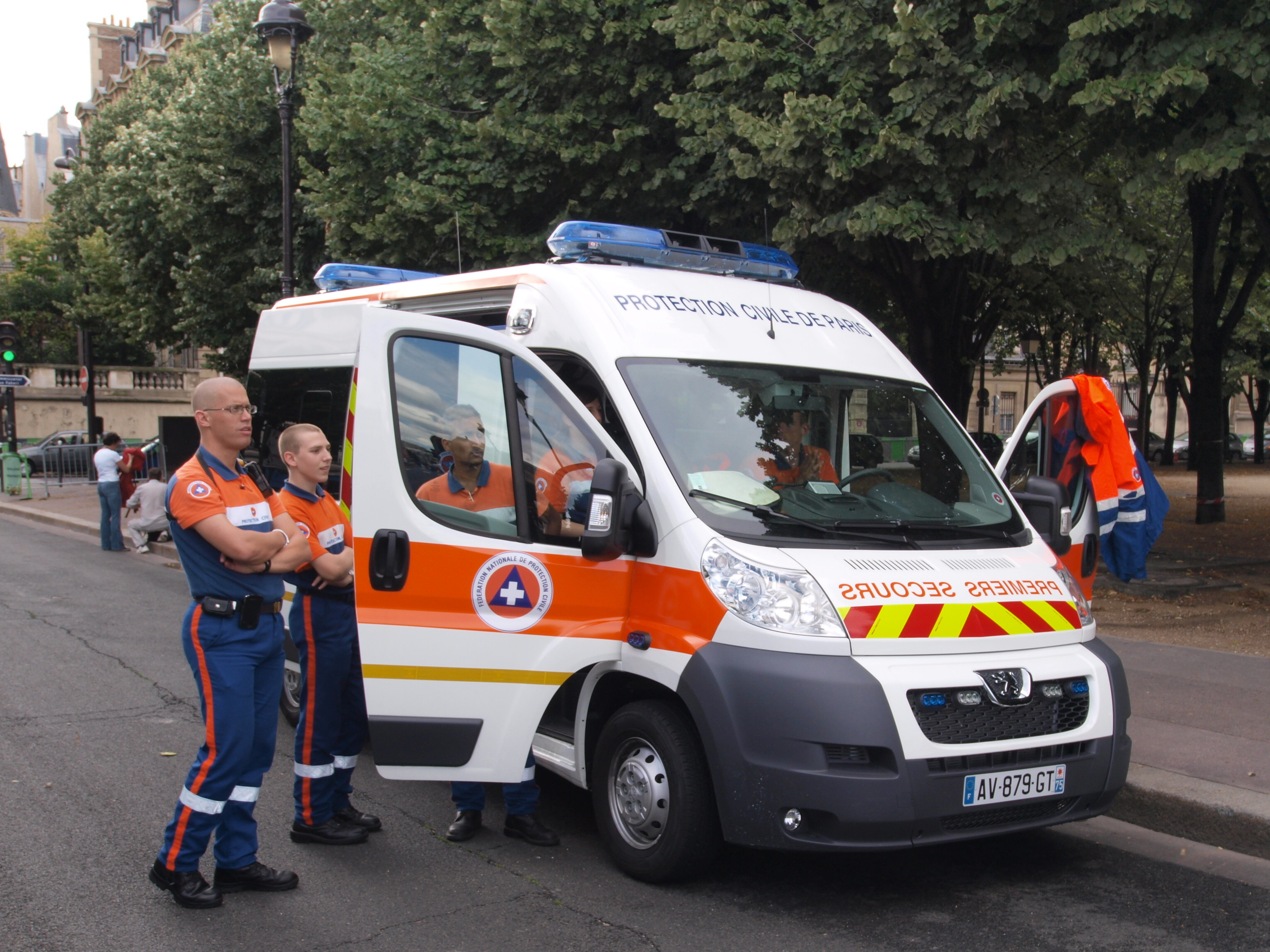
First aid vehicle (ambulance)

=== Uniform ===
Volunteers must wear combat boots and the Federal uniform during their missions. The trousers are blue with a vertical orange band on each side and reflective tape. The white, blue and orange top displays the logo and the words "PROTECTION CIVILE" on the back and on the right shoulder.

Since 2012, the uniform has been in accordance with the European standard for high visibility clothing, number NF EN 471.

During some missions, first responders can wear an F2 helmet.
