= Arles Amphitheatre =

Ancient Roman amphitheater in Arles, France

Coordinates: 43°40′40″N 4°37′52″E

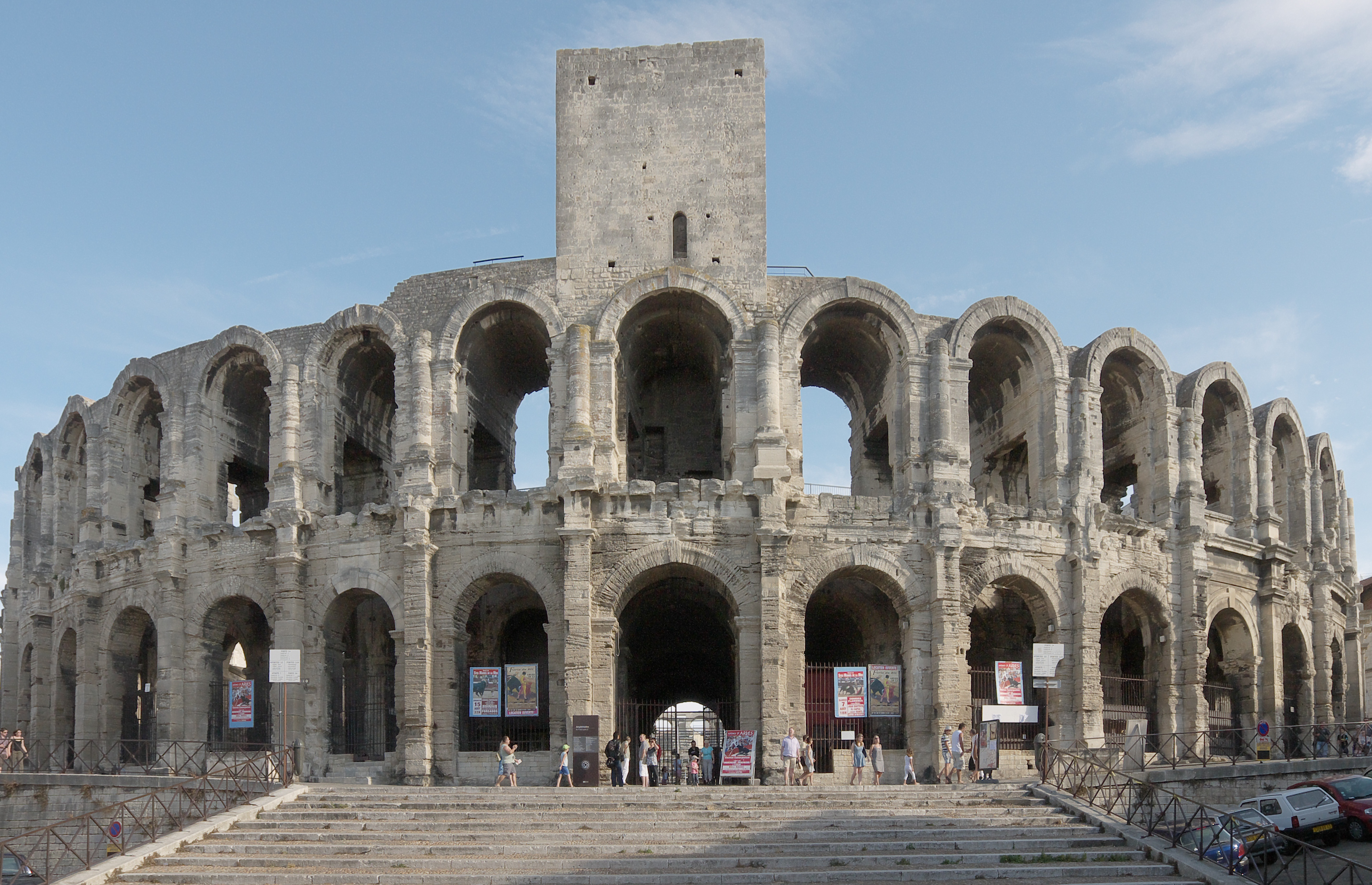
- Arles amphitheater from the north, with one of the three medieval towers.
- Interactive map of Arles Amphitheatre
- Type: Roman amphitheatre
- Periods: Roman Empire
- Location: Arles, Bouches-du-Rhône, France

History
- Built: 90 AD

Site notes
- Height: 21 m (69 ft)
- Length: 136 m (446 ft)
- Width: 109 m (358 ft)

UNESCO World Heritage Site
- Part of: Arles, Roman and Romanesque Monuments
- Criteria: Cultural: ii, iv
- Reference: 164
- Inscription: 1981 (5th Session)

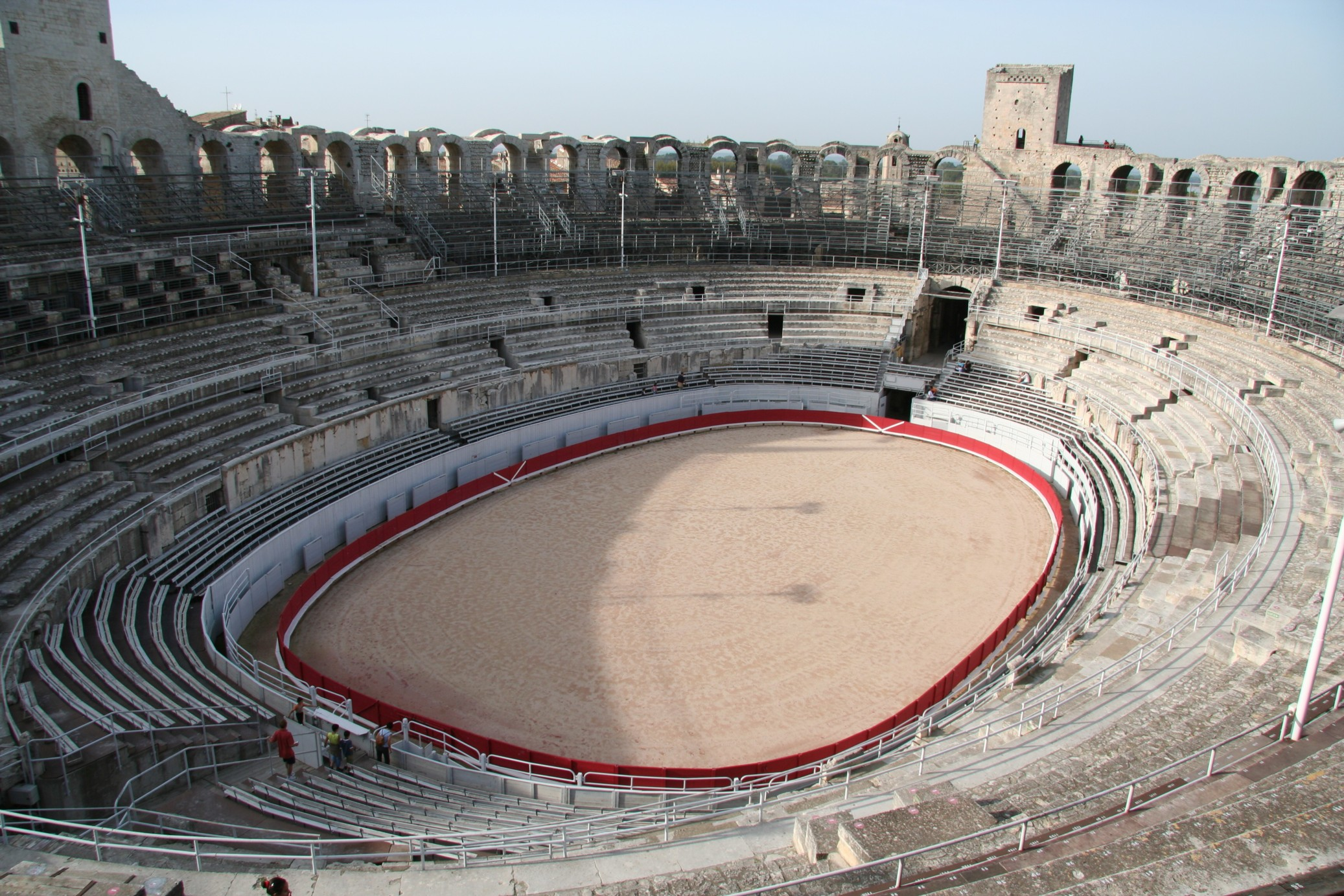
Interior with arena

The Arles Amphitheatre (French: Arènes d'Arles; Occitan: Amfiteatre d'Arles) is a Roman amphitheatre in Arles, southern France. Two-tiered, it is likely the most prominent tourist attraction in the city which thrived in ancient Rome. The towers jutting out from the top are medieval add-ons.

Built in 90 AD, the amphitheatre held over 20,000 spectators of chariot races and bloody hand-to-hand battles. Nowadays, it draws smaller crowds for bullfighting during the Feria d'Arles, as well as plays and concerts in summer.

In 1981, Arles Amphitheatre was listed as a UNESCO World Heritage Site, together with other Roman and medieval buildings of the city, as part of the Arles, Roman and Romanesque Monuments group.

== Building ==
The building measures 136 m (446 ft) in length and 109 m (358 ft) wide, and features 120 arches. It has an oval arena surrounded by terraces, arcades on two levels (60 in all), bleachers, a system of galleries, drainage system in many corridors of access and staircases for a quick exit from the crowd. It was obviously inspired by the Colosseum in Rome (in 72–80), being built slightly later (in 90). The amphitheatre was not expected to receive 25,000 spectators, the architect was therefore forced to reduce the size and replace the dual system of galleries outside the Colosseum by a single annular gallery. This difference is explained by the conformation of the land. This "temple" of the games housed gladiators and hunting scenes for more than four centuries.

== After Rome ==
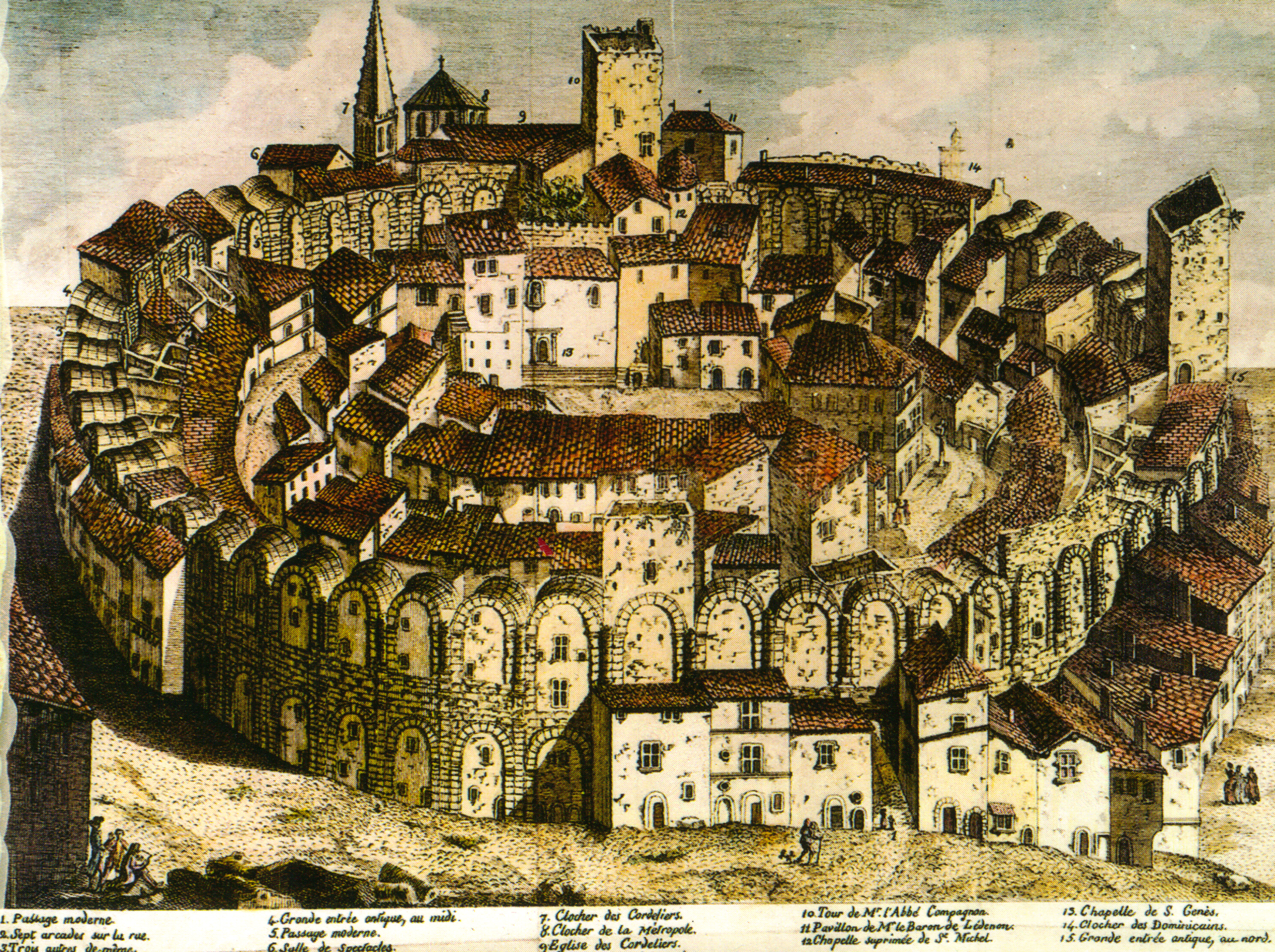
The amphitheatre in the 18th century

With the fall of the Western Empire in the 5th century, the amphitheatre became a shelter for the population and was transformed into a fortress with four towers (the southern tower is not restored). The structure encircled more than 200 houses, becoming a real town, with its public square built in the centre of the arena and two chapels, one in the centre of the building, and another one at the base of the west tower.

This new residential role continued until the late 18th century, and in 1825 through the initiative of the writer Prosper Mérimée, the change to national historical monument began. In 1826, expropriation began of the houses built within the building, which ended by 1830 when the first event was organized in the arena – a race of the bulls to celebrate the taking of Algiers.

== Gallery ==
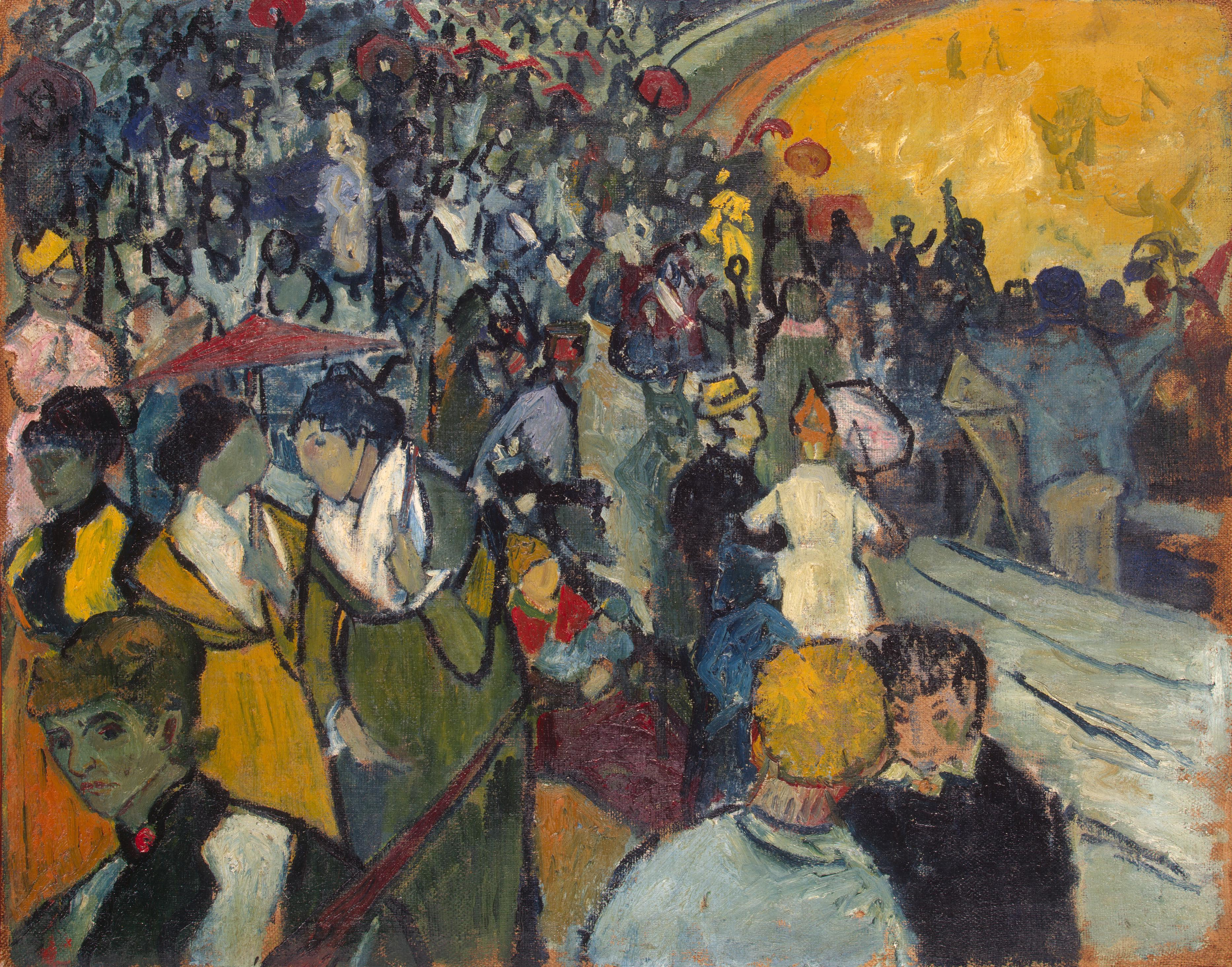
Les Arènes
Vincent van Gogh

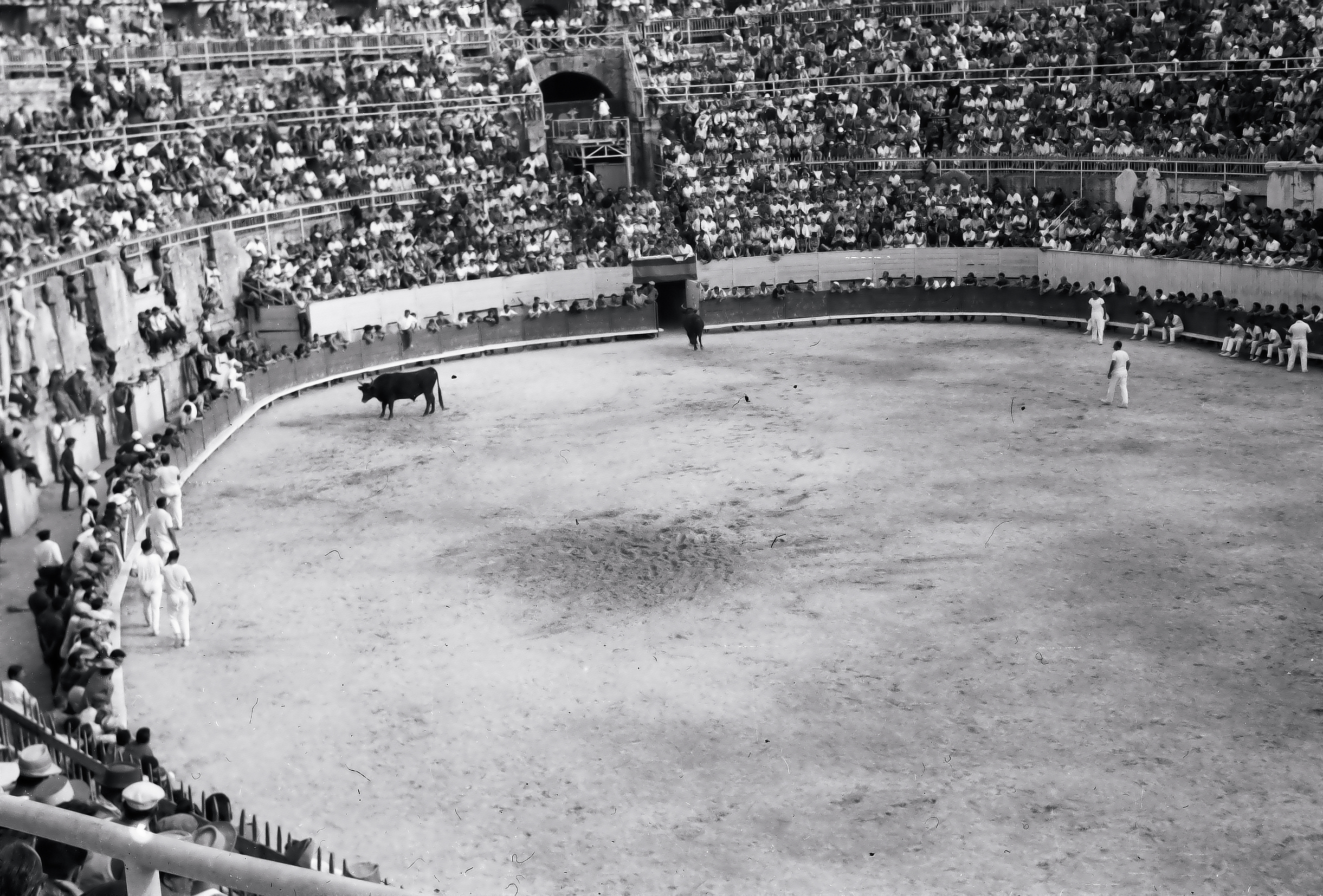
Bullfight from 1963

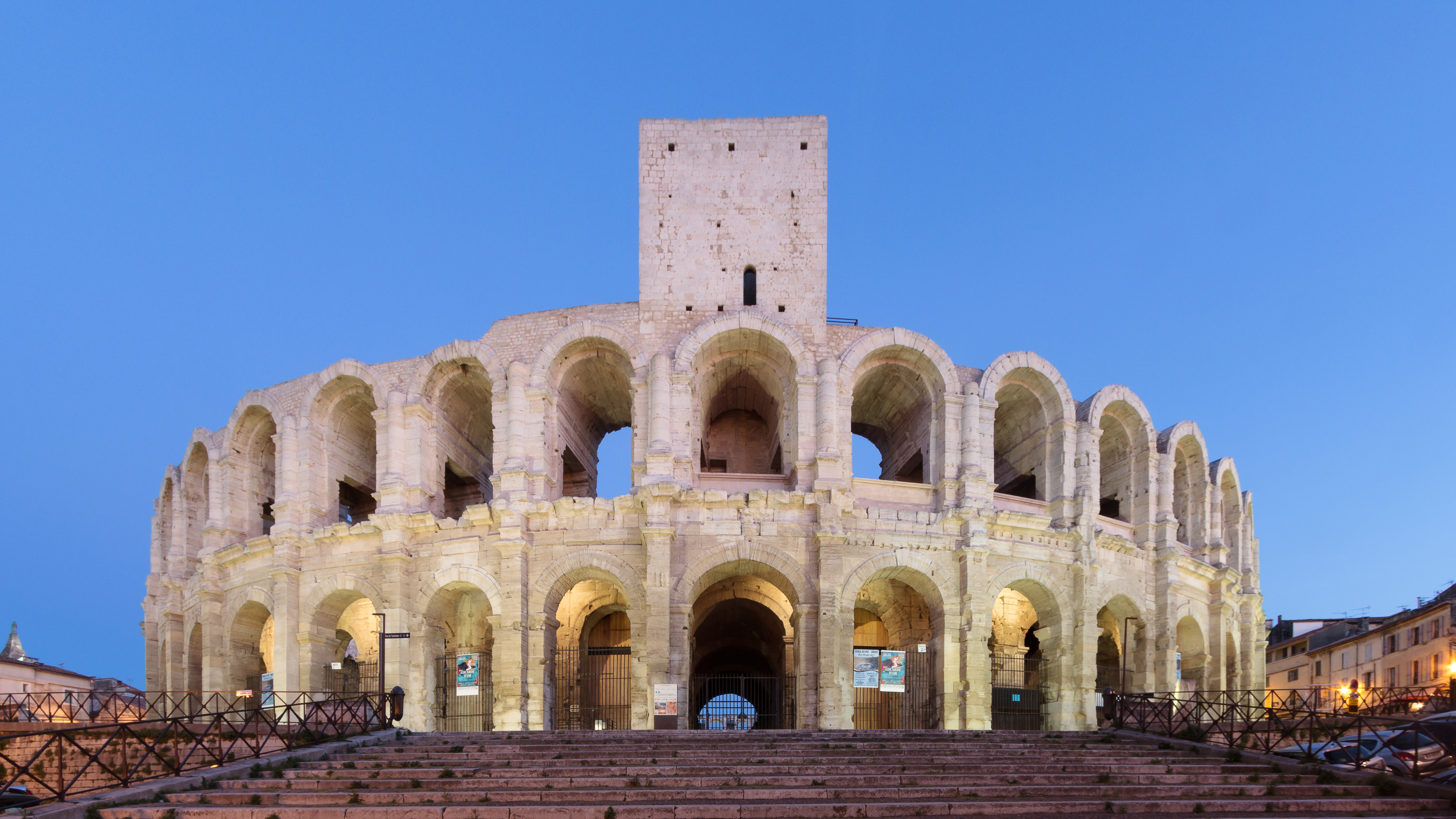
Exterior arcades, with a tower added in the 6th century

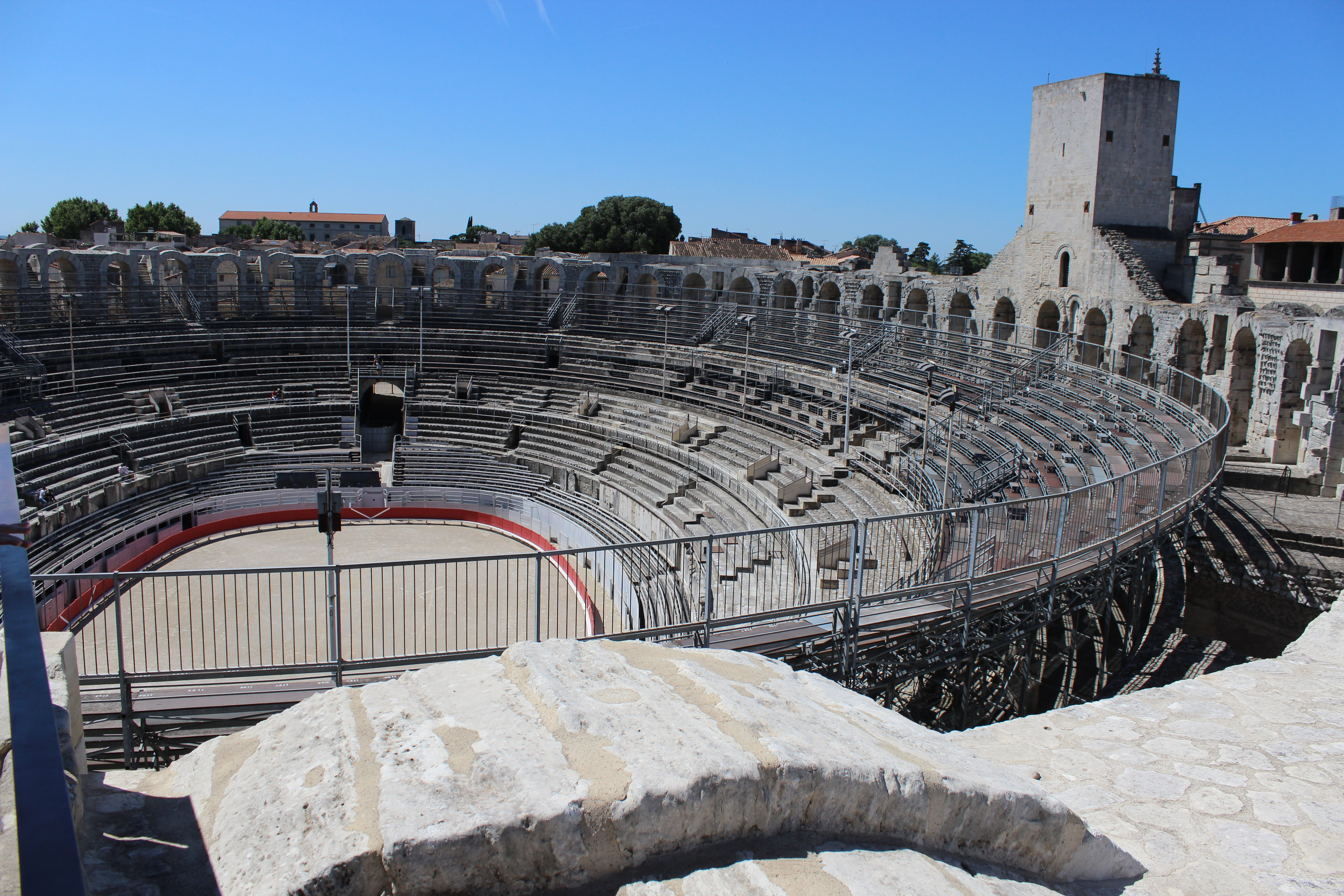
The arena

== See also ==
- List of Roman amphitheatres
- Les Arènes, an 1888 painting by Vincent van Gogh depicting the crowd attending a bullfight in the colosseum
- Architecture of Provence
- Ronin, a 1998 film directed by John Frankenheimer featuring an action sequence inside the Amphitheater
