= Certified first responder =

Person who provides pre-hospital care for medical emergencies

Volunteer firefighters trained as medical first responders extricate and treat a car accident victim.

A certified first responder is a person who has completed a course and received certification in providing pre-hospital care for medical emergencies. Certified individuals should have received much more instruction than someone who is trained in basic first aid and cardiopulmonary resuscitation (CPR) but they are not necessarily a substitute for more advanced emergency medical care rendered by emergency medical technicians and paramedics. First responders typically provide advanced first aid level care, CPR, and automated external defibrillator (AED) usage. The term "certified first responder" is not to be confused with "first responder", which is a generic term referring to the first medically trained responder to arrive on scene (EMS, police, fire) and medically trained telecommunication operators who provide pre-arrival medical instructions as trained Emergency Medical Dispatchers (EMD). Many police officers and firefighters are required to receive training as certified first responders. Advanced medical care is typically provided by EMS, although some police officers and firefighters also train to become emergency medical technicians or paramedics.

== Terminology ==
Also called an Emergency Medical Responder, Emergency First Responder, Medical First Responder, or First Responder.

== Canada ==
Many options are available in order to become a certified First Responder in Canada. Courses are offered by many sources including the Canadian Red Cross, and St. John Ambulance, and the Department of National Defence. Certified First Responder courses in Canada are separated into either "First Responder" or "Emergency Medical Responder" level courses. "First Responder" level courses are between 40 and 60 hours in length and is considered the minimum level of training for crews providing medical standby at events, as well as for employment with some private stable transport companies that provide inter-hospital transfer for patients in need of a bed, but are stable and do not require advanced medical care. "Emergency Medical Responder" level courses meet the Paramedic Association of Canada's National Occupational Competency Profile, and those who receive certification at this level can work for Emergency Medical Services in some provinces.

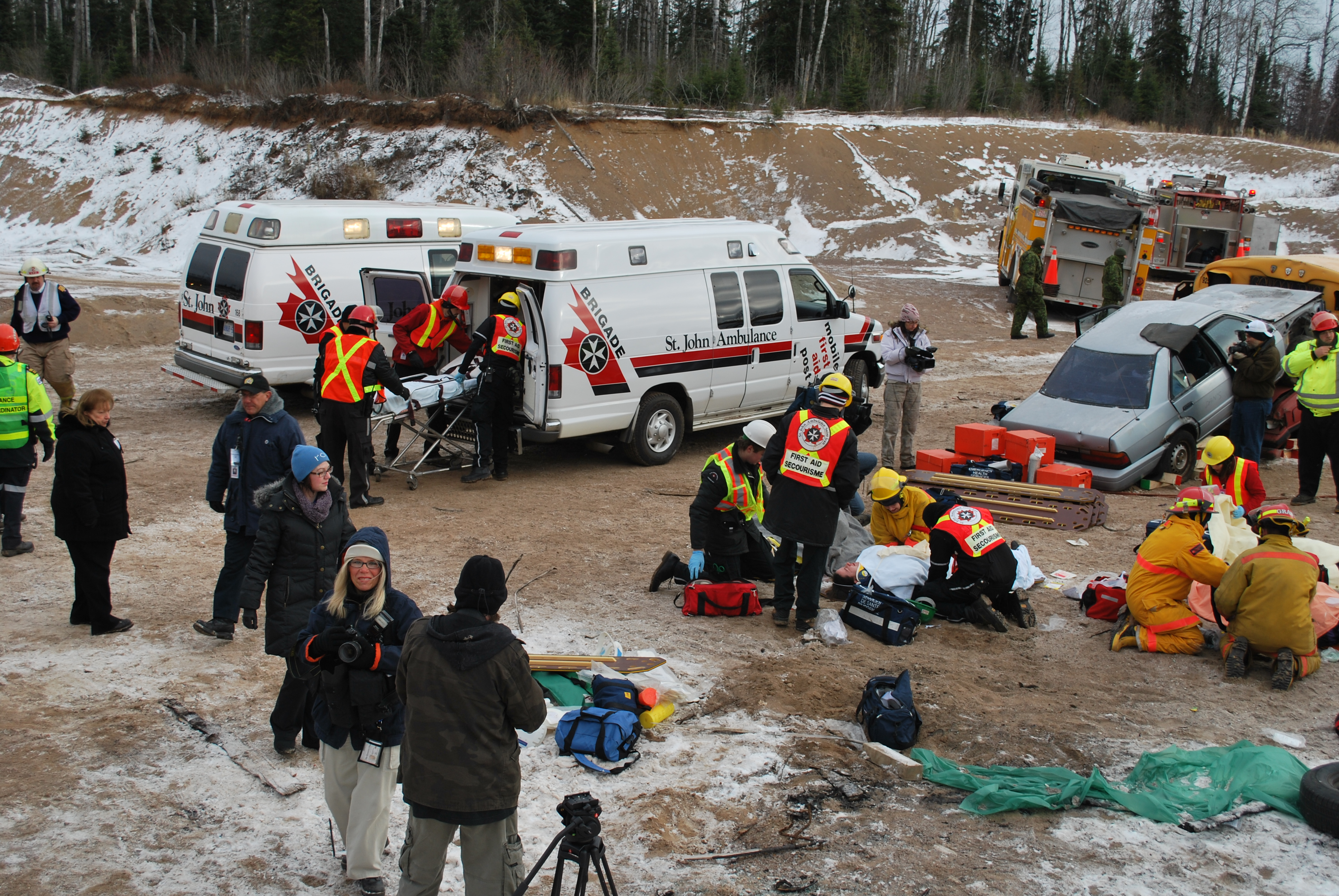
First Responders from St. John Ambulance and fire departments assist paramedics during an exercise outside Thunder Bay, Ontario, Canada

=== Examples ===
The Canadian Ski Patrol, St. John Ambulance Patient Care Divisions, Fire Departments, Campus Emergency Response Teams, few private medical services, and the Canadian Coast Guard all provide First Responder level emergency medical care, in some cases as a support to existing services, and in others as the primary emergency response organization.

=== Limitations on Certified First Responders ===
While all Certified First Responders in Canada are covered under Good Samaritan laws in jurisdictions where they are enacted, in some cases they have a Duty To Act for example, Ontario. Certified First Responders who are providing medical coverage to events (such as Red Cross, St. John Ambulance's Patient Care Divisions and private event medical companies), as well as those who are employed by Volunteer Fire Departments, Campus Response Teams, and others who are required to perform Emergency Medical Response as part of their duties all have a Duty to Act. While Certified First Responders in general are not required to render aid to injured/ill persons, those who work in the aforementioned areas can be accused of and prosecuted for negligence if they fail to respond when notified of a medical emergency, if their care does not meet the standard to which they were trained, or their care exceeds their scope of practice and causes harm to the patient. As with all medically trained and certified persons, Certified First Responders are immune to successful prosecution if assistance was given in good faith up to, and not beyond, the limits of certification and training.

== France ==
In France, pre-hospital care is performed either by first responders from the fire department (sapeurs-pompiers, in most emergency situations) or from a private ambulance company (relative emergency at home), or by a medical team that includes a physician, a nurse and an emergency medical technician (called "SMUR"). The intermediate scale, the firefighter nurse (infirmier sapeur-pompier, ISP), is only a recent evolution and is performed by nurses who have been specially trained acting with emergency protocols; these nurses are the French equivalent of paramedics. The arrival of first responders is thus the most common result of an emergency call. In addition, in France there exists a network of first responder associations, as French Red Cross (Croix-rouge française), French Civil Protection (Protection civile), FFSS (Fédération Française de Sauvetage et de Secourisme) or others. These CFR volunteers are allowed to supervise massive outside meetings, student gatherings, et cetera. These volunteers have followed the same special rescuer training as firefighters (PSE 1 and PSE 2, in all 70 hours of training).

== Thailand ==
In the Kingdom of Thailand (Thailand) First Responder is a certification most commonly achieved by local volunteers. This certification is referred to as Emergency Medical Responder or EMR. EMRs can provide emergency care for vehicle collisions, trauma, CPR, birthing, and other emergencies. EMRs must maintain their certification through a foundation, club, association, or government agency. The next level of certification in emergency response is Emergency Medical Technician Basic (EMT-B).

Training for EMR level must be done through an approved training. Most provincial hospitals provide training or are directly connected with teaching the training. EMR is a 50-hour course. The National Institute for Emergency Medicine of Thailand acts as the approving body for Emergency Medical Responder certification and provides the training curriculum. Guidelines for EMRs are published in the Emergency Medical Operation Manual for First Responder Units. Certification only lasts for two 2 years and requires refresher training to maintain.

Rescue clubs and ambulance foundations most often serve communities with volunteers to respond to emergencies with ambulances and other rescue resources. Most foundations and clubs request volunteers to acquire at least the Emergency Medical Responder level of training. Most EMR level units use pickup trucks with elevated caps to respond to emergencies. These vehicles usually are marked with the association name and seal along with lighting and sirens. Units at this level act as the first arriving responders, and must do much to stabilize the scene for other units, such as Advanced Life Support (ALS), to arrive. EMR units often transport patients to medical treatment facilities especially for basic level patients and when ALS units are unavailable. EMRs coordinate with firefighters, police, and other medical professionals in emergency situations.

== United Kingdom ==
In the United Kingdom, most statutory NHS ambulance services deploy paid first responders who drive dedicated rapid response vehicles. These are typically estate cars, MPVs or 4x4s, are liveried with high-visibility ambulance markings, and fitted with blue flashing lights and sirens. These vehicles are generally single-crewed, by a paramedic. This differs from most ambulances in the UK, which usually have two crew members.

=== Community First Responder Schemes ===
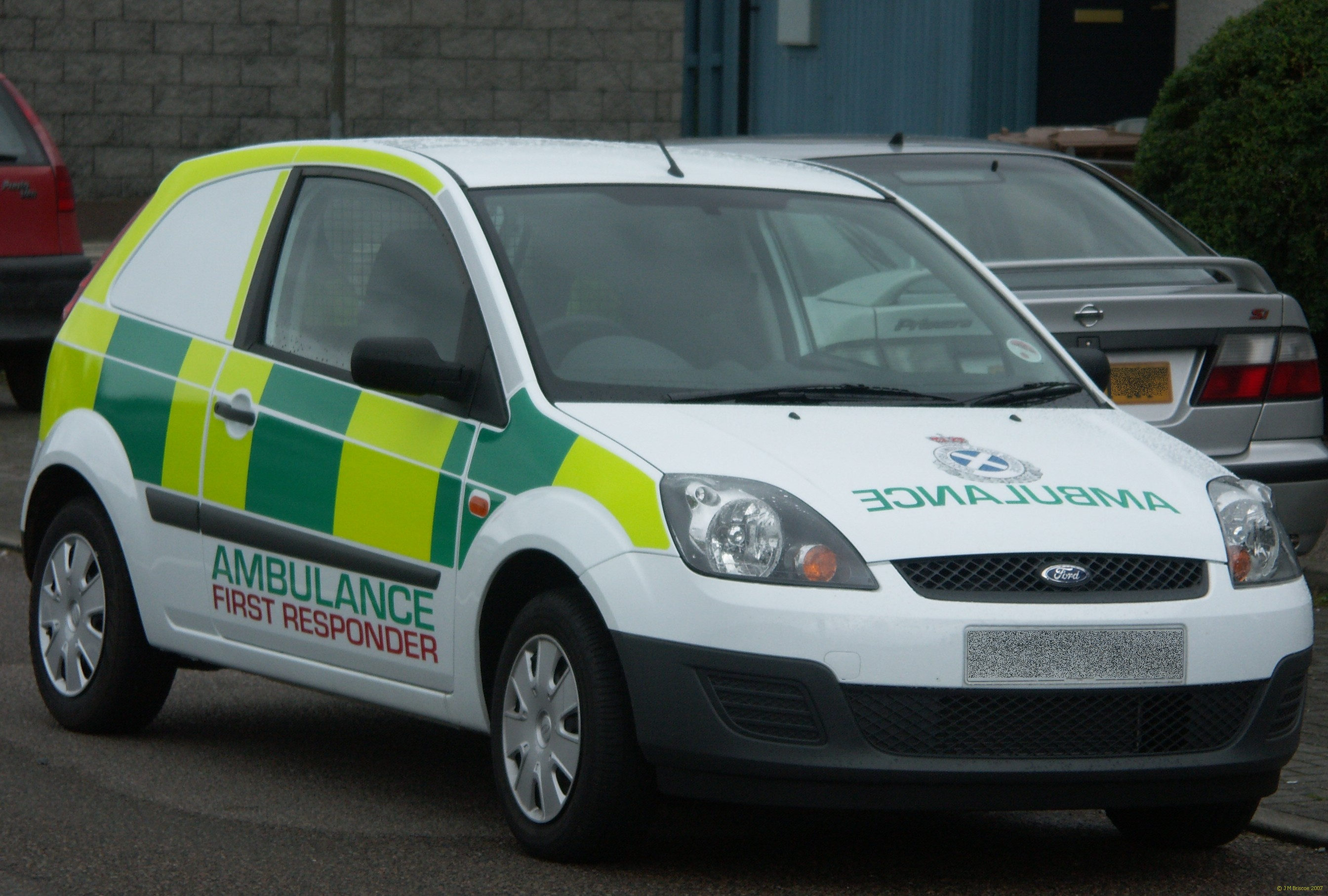
Scottish Ambulance Service "First responder" vehicle

A Community First Responder Scheme is made up of groups of volunteers who, within the community in which they live or work, have been trained to attend emergency calls received by the NHS (National Health Service) Ambulance Service, providing potentially life-saving treatment and first aid until an emergency ambulance arrives.

The Welsh Ambulance Services NHS Trust, when looking at the locations for Responder Groups, take the following into consideration:

- Towns or villages where it is challenging for an emergency ambulance to arrive at scene within 8 minutes – this is usually in the more rural areas of the county.
- The total number of calls received within these locations must be significant enough for training to take place, ensuring motivation of the group members and that their contribution would have a valued, significant effect on patients.
- Community first responders are members of the community who are trained to use an automated external defibrillator, give oxygen, and use other pieces of lifesaving equipment to assist ambulance crews, and maintain patient stability whilst professional crews are in attendance. Responders have no special dispensation to break the rules of the road whilst attending calls. Under the Road Traffic Act and various other UK traffic law, correct and permitted use of Blue Lights on a vehicle does not allow the driver to cross solid white lines to overtake, but does allow the driver to treat a red light as a 'Give Way' sign. Out of all the Ambulance trusts in the UK, a handful have CFR schemes with dedicated cars, and these are not given blue lights as CFR's do not undergo blue light training.

== United States ==
See Emergency Medical Responder

=== History ===
The U.S. Department of Transportation (D.O.T.) recognized a gap between the typical eight hours training required for providing advanced first aid (as taught by the Red Cross) and the 180 hours typical of an EMT-Basic program. Also, some rural communities could not afford the comprehensive training and highly experienced instructors required for a full EMT-Basic course. The First Responder training program began in 1979 as an outgrowth of the "Crash Injury Management" course.

In 1995 the D.O.T. issued a manual for an intermediate level of training called "First Responder." This training can be completed in twenty-four to sixty hours. Importantly, this training can be conducted by an EMT-Basic with some field experience—which is a resource available "in-house" for many volunteer fire departments who do not have the resources for full EMT training. The first responder training is intended to fill the gap between First Aid and Emergency Medical Technician.

The American Red Cross conducts a course titled "Emergency Medical Response" that fits this definition.

In the US the term "Emergency Medical Responder" has largely replaced the term "Certified First Responder" or "Medical First Responder" beginning in 2012. "Emergency Medical Responder" or "EMR" is an EMS certification level recognized by the National Registry of Emergency Medical Technicians.

By 2015, most states recognize the level of Emergency Medical Responder.

=== Scope of practice ===
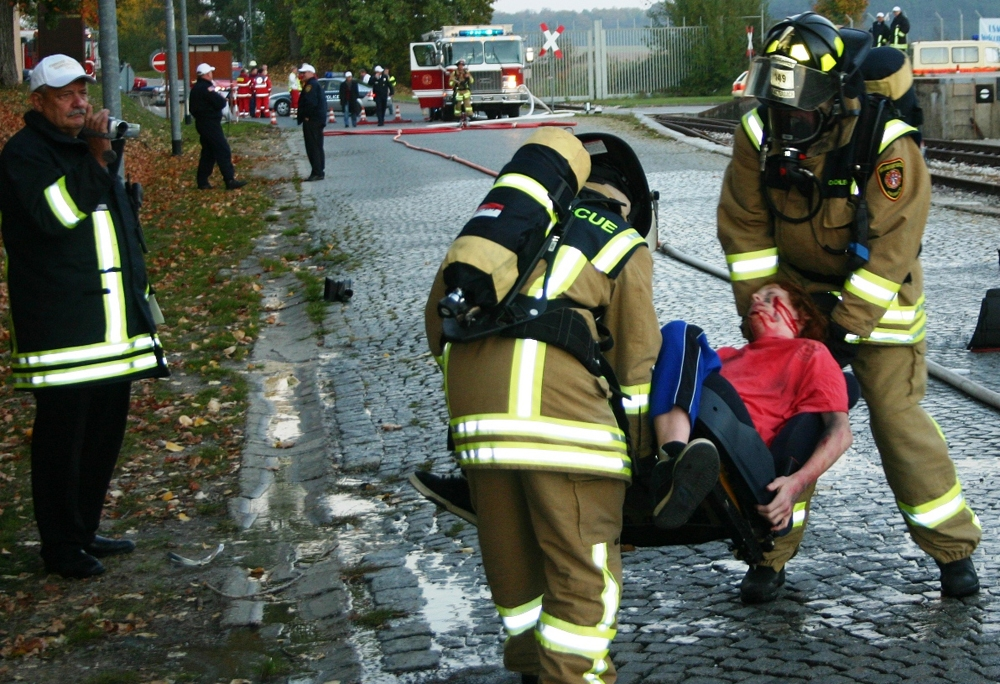
Emergency responders are tested during a training exercise.

First Responders in the US can either provide initial emergency care first on the scene (police/fire department/search and rescue) or support Emergency Medical Technicians and Paramedics. The skills allowed at this level are very similar to an EMT's including bleeding control, positive pressure ventilation with a bag valve mask, oral airway, nasal airway, supplemental oxygen administration, suctioning, cardio-pulmonary resuscitation (CPR), use of an automated external defibrillator (AED), manual stabilization of fractures, and assisting in the administration of basic medications such as epinephrine auto-injectors, oral glucose, and inhalers. They are also trained in packaging, moving and transporting patients.

=== Skills and limitations ===
First Responders can serve as secondary providers with some volunteer EMS services. An Emergency Medical Responder can be seen either as an advanced first aid provider, or as a limited provider of emergency medical care when more advanced providers have not yet arrived or are not available.

Skillwise, a certified first responder in the US is often trained and allowed to do most of what an emergency medical technician is allowed to. Some exceptions in some jurisdictions include insertion of King airways or combi-tubes, traction splinting, and administration of nebulized albuterol.

=== Rescue ===
The National Fire Protection Association standards 1006 and 1670 state that all "rescuers" must have medical training to perform any technical rescue operation, including cutting the vehicle itself during an extrication. Therefore, in most all rescue environments, whether it is an EMS or Fire Department that runs the rescue, the actual rescuers who cut the vehicle and run the extrication scene or perform any rescue such as rope rescues or swift water rescue, etc., are Emergency Medical Responders, Emergency Medical Technicians, or Paramedics, as most every rescue has a patient involved.

=== Traditional first responders ===
The first responder training is considered a bare minimum for emergency service workers who may be sent out in response to an emergency call. It is almost always required for professional and volunteer firefighters. For example, all firefighters of the New York City Fire Department require a valid CFR-D (Certified First Responder - Defibrillation) certification. The first responder level of emergency medical training is also often required for police officers, rescue squad personnel, and search and rescue personnel. Many first responders have location specific training such as water rescue or mountain rescue and must take advanced courses to be certified (i.e. lifeguard).

=== Non-traditional first responders ===
Many people who do not fall into the earlier mentioned categories seek out or receive this type of training because they are likely to be first on the scene of a medical emergency, or because they work far from medical help.

Some of these non-traditional first responders include:

- SCUBA Divers
- Park rangers
- Utility workers
- Teachers, childcare workers, and school bus drivers
- Designated industrial workers in a large facility (industrial plant) or at a remote site (fish-packing plant, commercial vessel, oil rig)
- Security Officers
- Emergency management personnel
- Search and rescue personnel
- Campus Responders and campus police
- Lifeguards
- Ski Patrollers
- Community Emergency Response Team (CERT) members (varies by jurisdiction)
- Stage Managers

== See also ==
- Emergency medical responder
- Emergency medical technician
- Paramedic
- Rescue squad
- National First Responders Organization (USA)
- Outdoor Emergency Care
