= Feria (festival) =

Annual festival in Spain and southern France

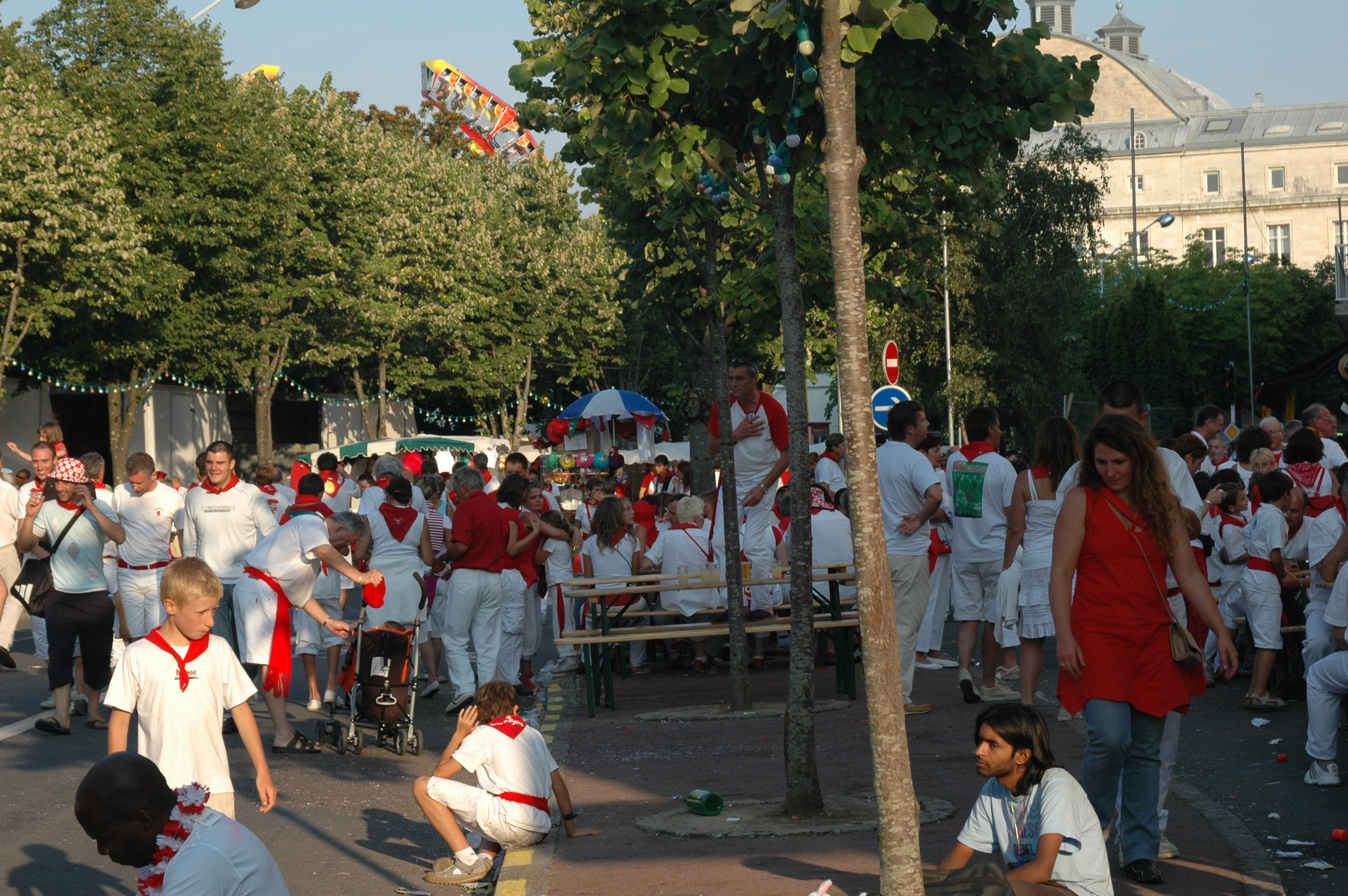
Festayres during the fêtes de Bayonne

A feria (fair in English) is an annual local festival in Spain and south-western France, characterized by bullfights, bull running in the streets, bodegas (outdoor bars or cellars with festive music) and bandas. The word festayre (from the Gascon hestaire) means ferias' partiers.

== Introduction ==
=== In Spain ===
The Spanish word feria originally designates a fair (agricultural, books, ...). Bullfights are often given on the occasion of fairs, so the Spaniards came to designate by the term "fair" a series of bullfightings organized on this occasion, and often - especially in Andalusia - the festivities that accompany these bullfights. In many parts of Spain, there is nevertheless still a parting between the festivities and the feria which takes place on this occasion. Thus, in Pamplona, one differentiates the San Fermín (Fiestas de San Fermín or Sanfermines) of the Feria del Toro, which means the eight bullfights cycle, a novillada and a bullfight on horseback proposed for the festivities. Thus, festivities without taurine activities cannot be termed ferias.

The word continues to be used in Spain with exactly the same meaning as the English "fair." Just a look at the calendarios de ferias of all the Spanish regions to note that the majority of them have no bullfights.

One of Spain's most famous ferias is the Feria de abril (April Fair) of Seville. During this feria, the city hosts not only bullfights, but hundreds of casetas (private party tents) with flamenco dancing, and a large modern fairground with rides and Ferris Wheel and food courts selling paella, manzanilla, and grilled meats. The streets come alive with horses and horse carriages bearing locals in traditional Andalusian costume.

Other notable ferias take place each year in Malaga in August and in Cordoba in May.

In Andalusia, the oldest ferias correspond to the age of the bullring: the city of Jerez de la Frontera, whose bullring is one of the oldest in Spain, offers a Feria del Caballo in May and a feria de vendimia (grape harvest) in autumn. The city of Malaga offers the Feria de Málaga in August, as do virtually all towns in Spain's autonomous regions with first-, second- or third-category arenas. In 2003, there were 598 major bullfighting events (formal bullfights) and minor bullfighting events (novilladas, becerradas) in Spain, and 1,146 popular bullfighting events, including bull runs and toro de fuego. In 2004, there were 810 formal bullfights, 555 spiked novilladas, 380 rejoneos, and 187 mixed shows or spiked festivals.

=== In France ===
In France, the word was often used to refer to a series of bullfights. In the south and southwestern parts of France, people quickly confounded taurine feria and festival. Gascon towns have organized this movement over the past forty years. Thus, the Fêtes de Dax, officially became the Feria de Dax, thus breaking with the Spanish meaning and tradition. The popularity of these feasts and the media coverage that was made favored the substitution of the word fêtes by feria. Many municipalities - including those who hold no bullfight - as well have renamed their annual patron saint's festivals into ferias. And current usage followed. However, in Mont-de-Marsan as in Bayonne, the summer festive week continues to be called respectively Fêtes de la Madeleine and Fêtes de Bayonne. The feria de Nîmes (Pentecost Feria and Harvest Feria) are currently the largest ferias in France. The Pentecost Feria attracts nearly a million visitors over six days.

==== The main ferias of France ====
- Occitania region:
  - Alès
  - Feria d'Arles
  - Beaucaire
  - Béziers
  - Carcassonne
  - Céret
  - Châteaurenard
  - Collioure
  - Istres
  - Lunel
  - Millas
  - Mauguio
  - Nîmes
  - Palavas-les-Flots
  - Pézilla-la-Rivière
  - Saint-Gilles
  - Saintes-Maries-de-la-Mer
  - Vauvert
- Gascony
  - Aire-sur-Adour
  - Amou
  - Arzacq-Arraziguet
  - Bayonne
  - Dax
  - Eauze
  - Floirac
  - Hagetmau
  - Mimizan
  - Mont-de-Marsan
  - Orthez
  - Pomarez
  - Saint-Vincent-de-Tyrosse
  - Vic-Fezensac
  - Condom
  - Saint-Sever
  - Ondres
  - Parentis-en-Born
