= Louis Lareng =

French politician (1923–2019)

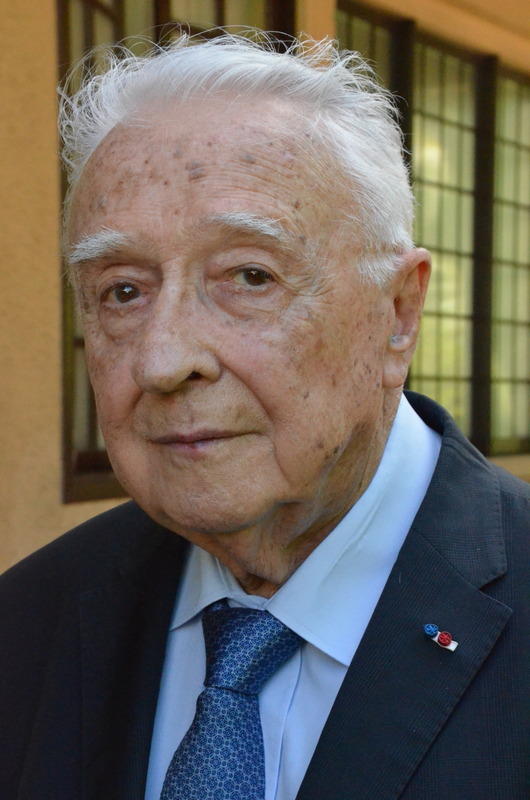
- Lareng in 2013
- Born: 8 April 1923; Ayzac-Ost, France
- Died: 3 November 2019 (aged 96); Toulouse, France
- Occupation: Politician
- Known for: Anesthesia resuscitation

Louis Lareng (8 April 1923 – 3 November 2019) was a French politician and professor of medicine specializing in anesthesia resuscitation.

Lareng, along with Dr. Madeleine Bertrand, founded the Urgent Medical Aid Service (SAMU) in France.

== Biography ==
The SAMU appeared for the first time in 1968 as a service for hospitals in Toulouse.

The service became officially government-run in 1986 after much advocating by Lareng. Lareng studied at the Facultés de Médecine de Toulouse, and practiced at Hospital Purpan for many years. He served as President of the European Society of Telemedicine, and served on the Executive Committee of International Society for Telemedicine and eHealth. Additionally, Lareng was President of the French Civil Protection from 1991 to 2009 and was chair of Haute-Garonne's Association of Civil Protection.
