= Feria d'Arles =

Annual festival in Arles, France

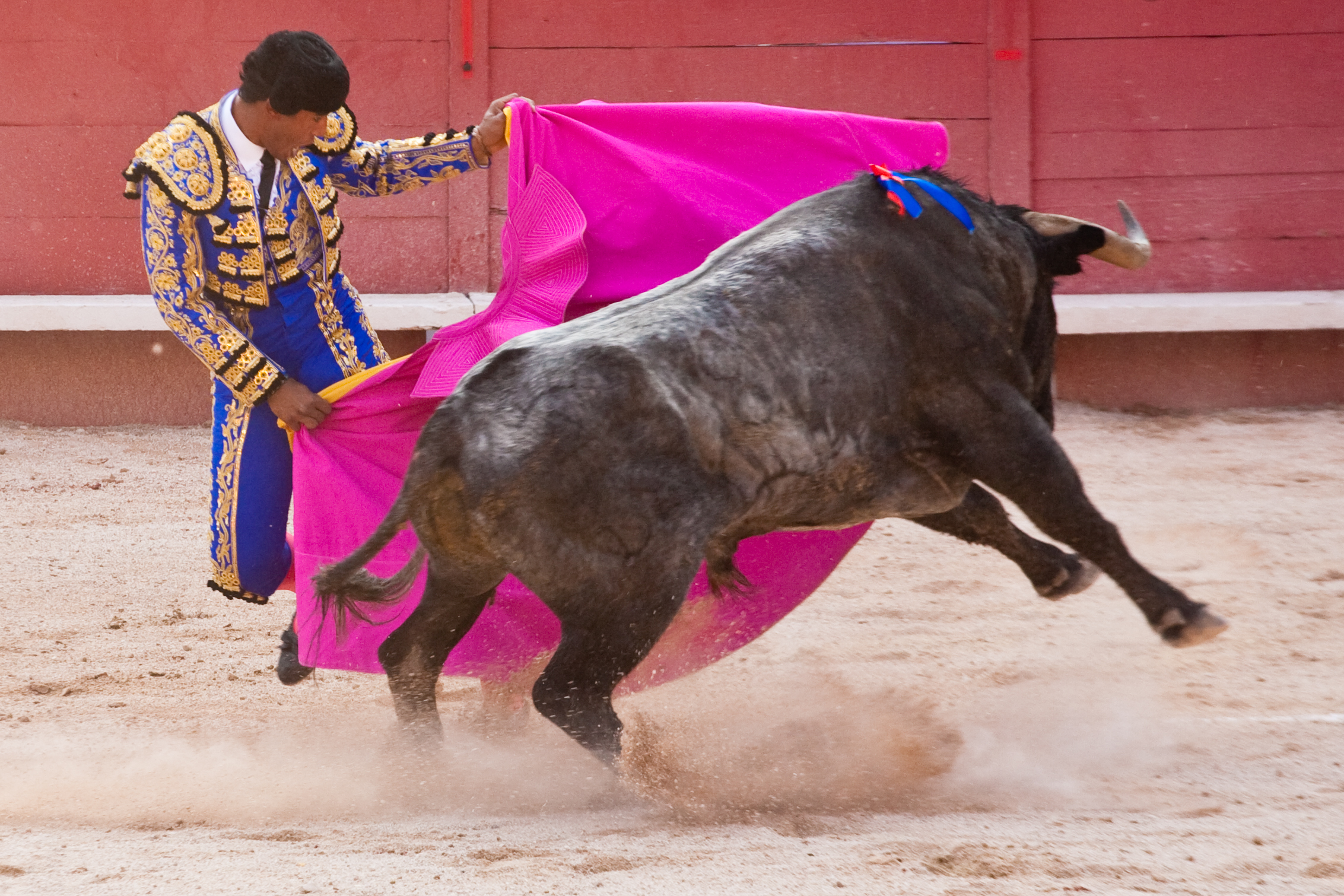
Feria d'Arles

Feria d'Arles (Occitan: Fèira d'Arles) is a popular festival centered on bull activities (including bullfighting) which is held each year in Arles, France.

== Presentation ==
Two different ferias take place, one in mid-September and one in April. The Easter feria in April opens the French bullfighting season and attracts more than 500,000 people, including 50,000 who assist with the bullfights in the Arles Amphitheatre. Numerous abrivados and bull games are organized in the city, and people gather in the streets with bodegas, moving orchestras (called peñas) and concerts.
