= Fêtes de Bayonne =

Series of festivals in Bayonne, France

Coordinates: 43°29′N 1°29′W

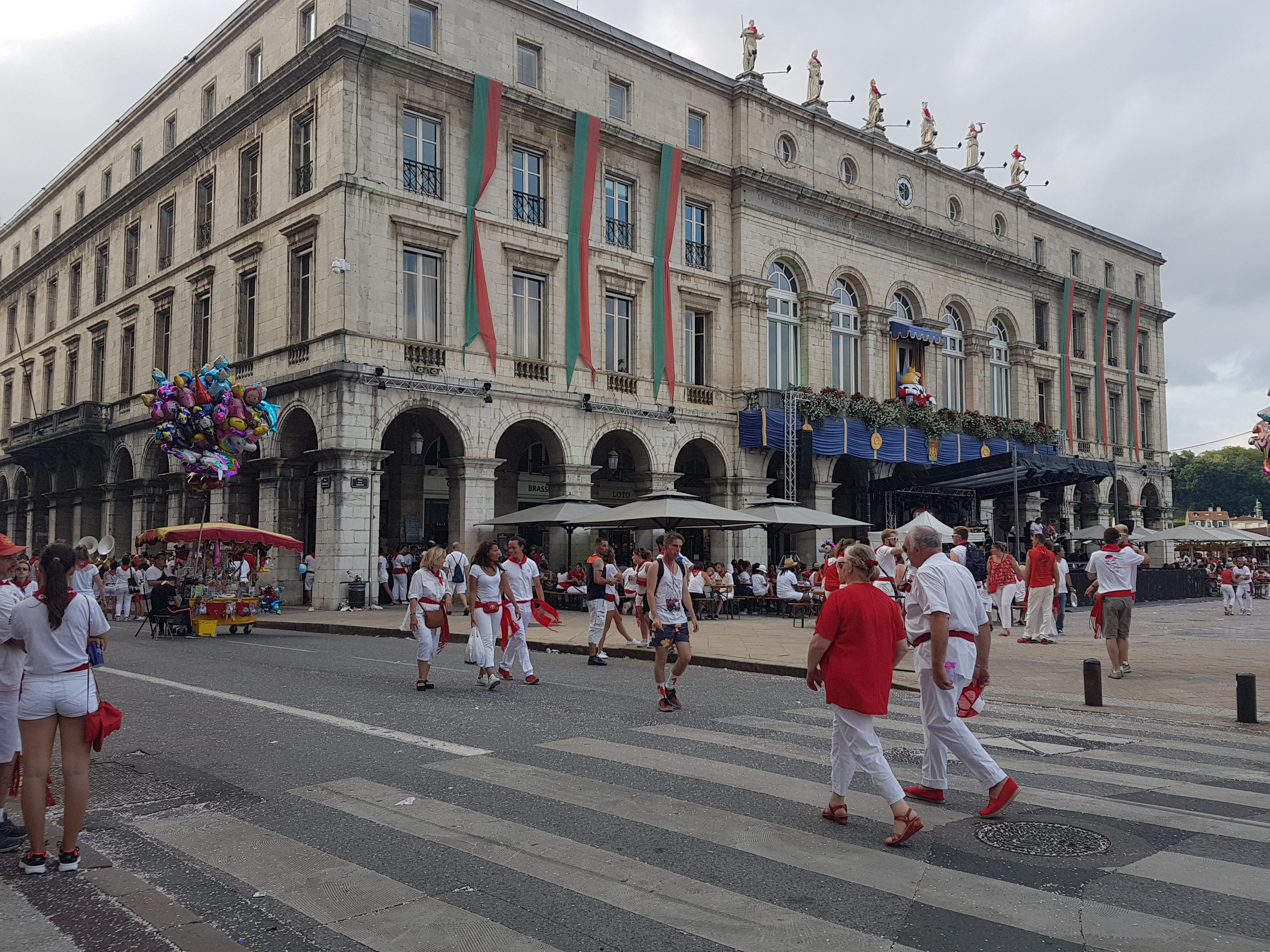
Bayonne during the 2018 festival

The fêtes de Bayonne (Occitan: Festas de Baiona; Basque: Baionako Jaiak) is a feria consisting in a series of festivals in the Northern Basque Country in the town of Bayonne. It is the largest festival in France with 1.3 to 1.5 milion participants registered in 2005. The festival lasts 5 days and always held during the last weeks of July.

The first "Fêtes de Bayonne," called "The Big Summer Festival," took place on July 13, 1932. It was instigated by a group of friends belonging to the Aviron Bayonnais rugby team. They wanted to create celebrations similar to those of San Fermin in Pamplona, Southern Basque Country (famous for their Running of the Bulls) in Bayonne.

Initially, the festival was dominated by the colours blue and white, the traditional colours of the Basque Country and the club Aviron Bayonnais. In 1954, the organising committee unsuccessfully attempted to encourage residents to wear the city's official colours, green and red. During the 1980s, the custom of wearing entirely white clothing, promoted by the organising committee of the time, became established. The white attire was also intended to symbolise the elimination of social divisions. A further tradition emerged of wearing red accessories, inspired by the Festival of San Fermin, where red neckerchiefs commemorate the blood of Saint Fermin, who was martyred. This gave rise to the tradition of wearing white clothing with red accessories, which has continued into the 21st century. According to tradition, the red neckerchief must not be tied around the neck before the festival is officially opened.

The festivals include musical and street performances, traditional dances, parades, and fireworks. Since the first Fêtes de Bayonne there is also a tradition of running of the cows and a newer tradition of Spanish-style bullfighting on the Arènes de Bayonne.

World War II & COVID-19 pandemic forced the Fêtes de Bayonne to go on hiatus from 1940 to 1945, and again in 2020.

== Gallery ==
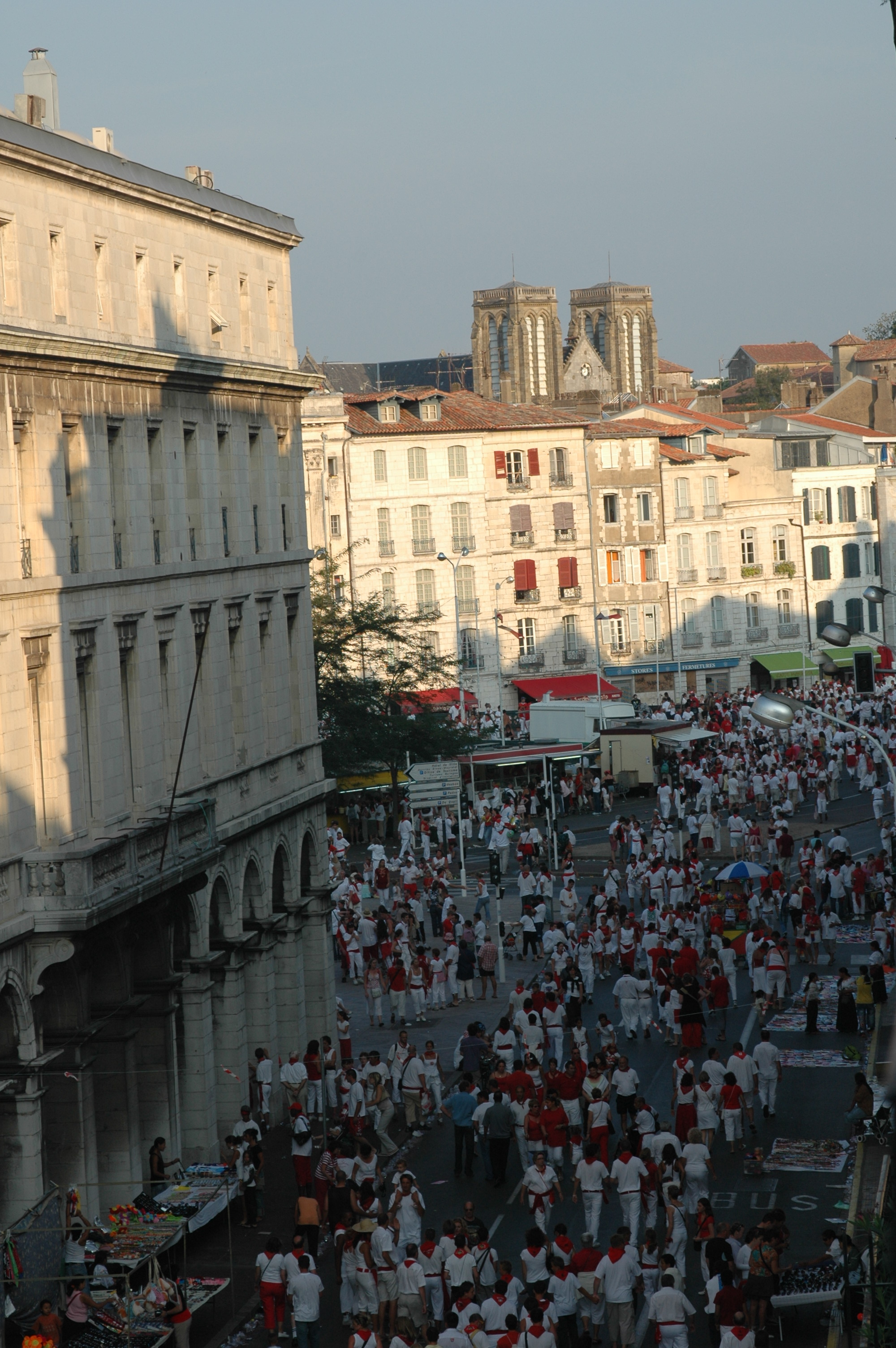
Fêtes 2006

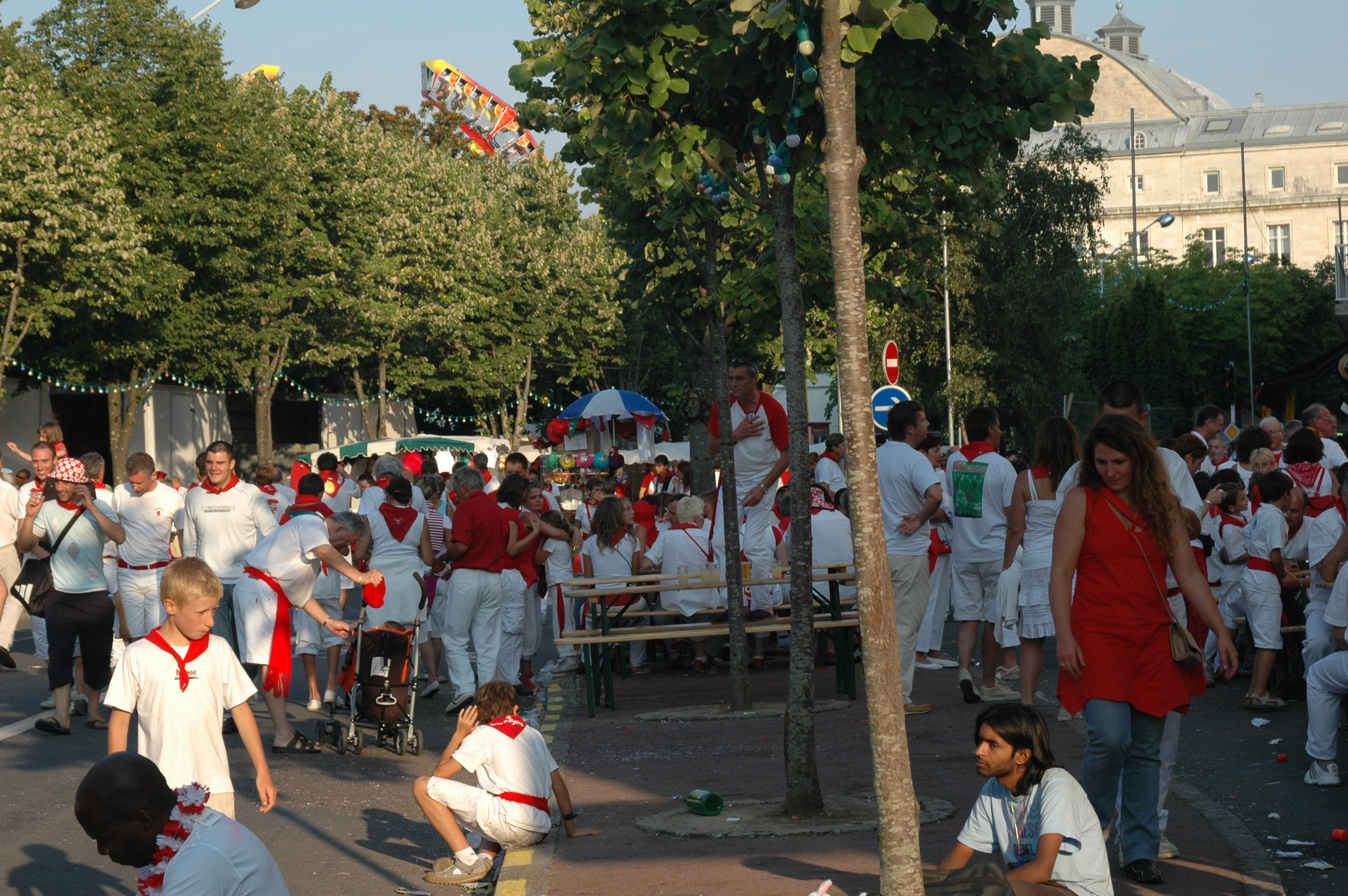
Fêtes 2006

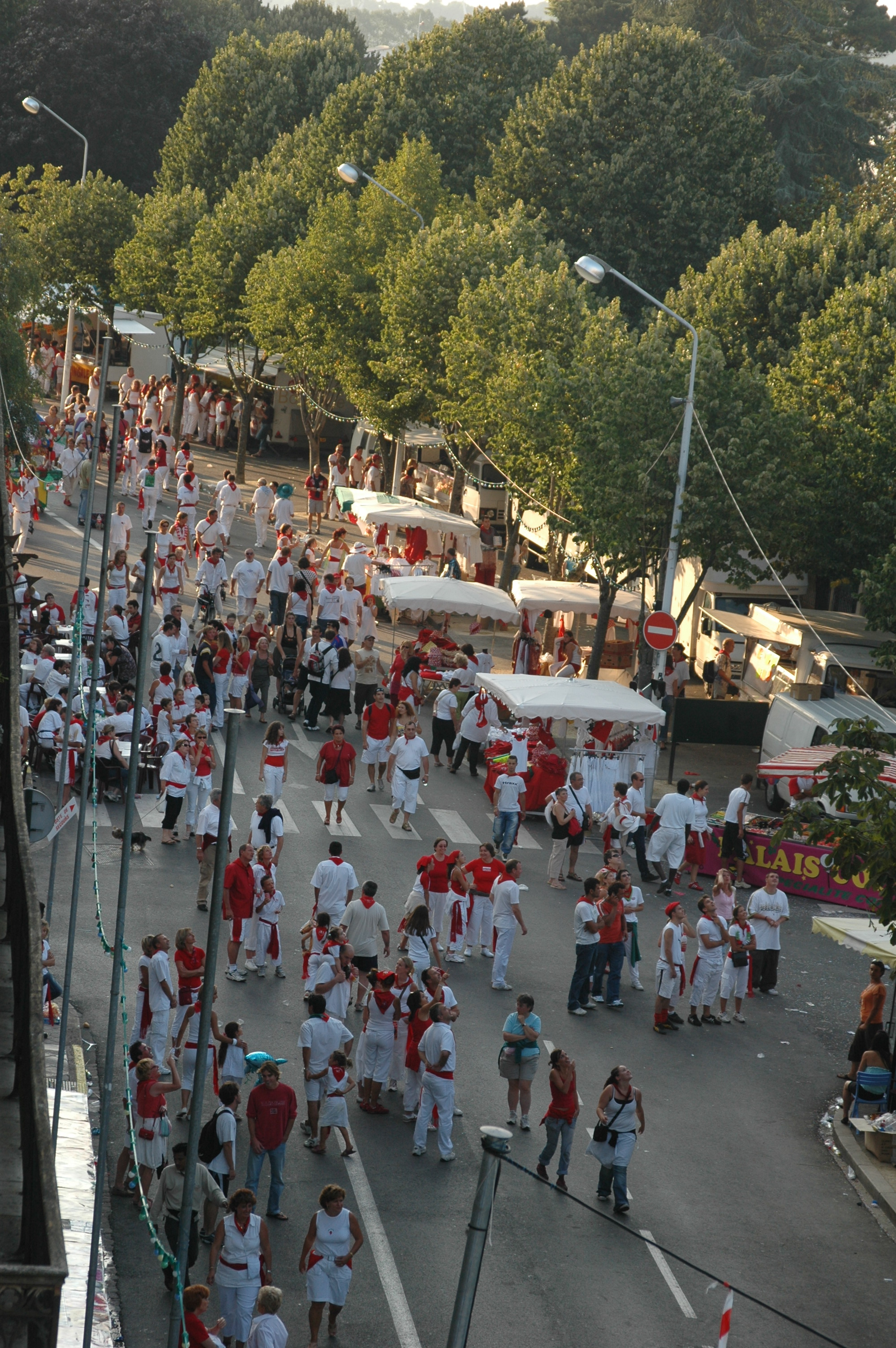
Fêtes 2006

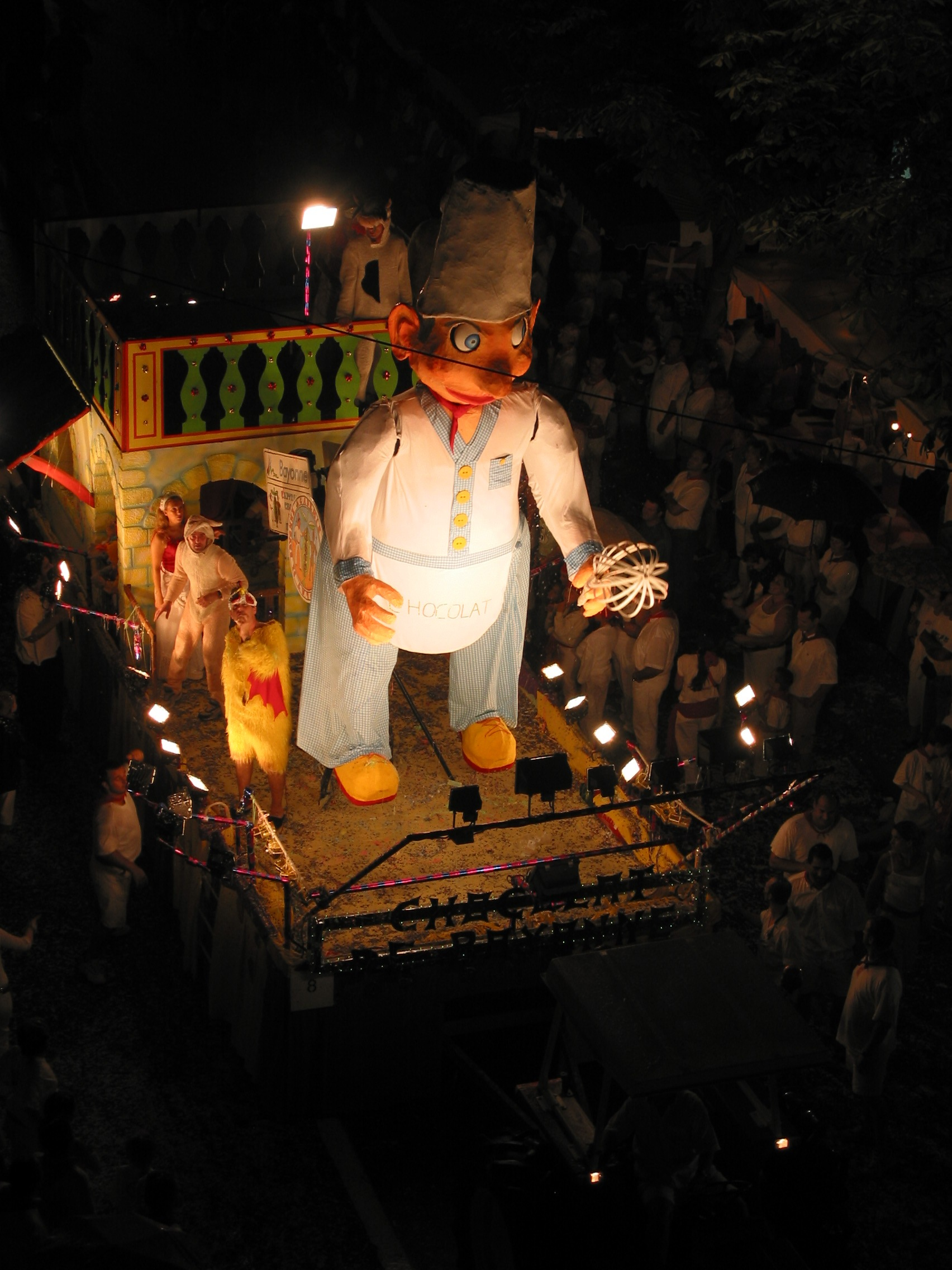
Corso lumineux 2004

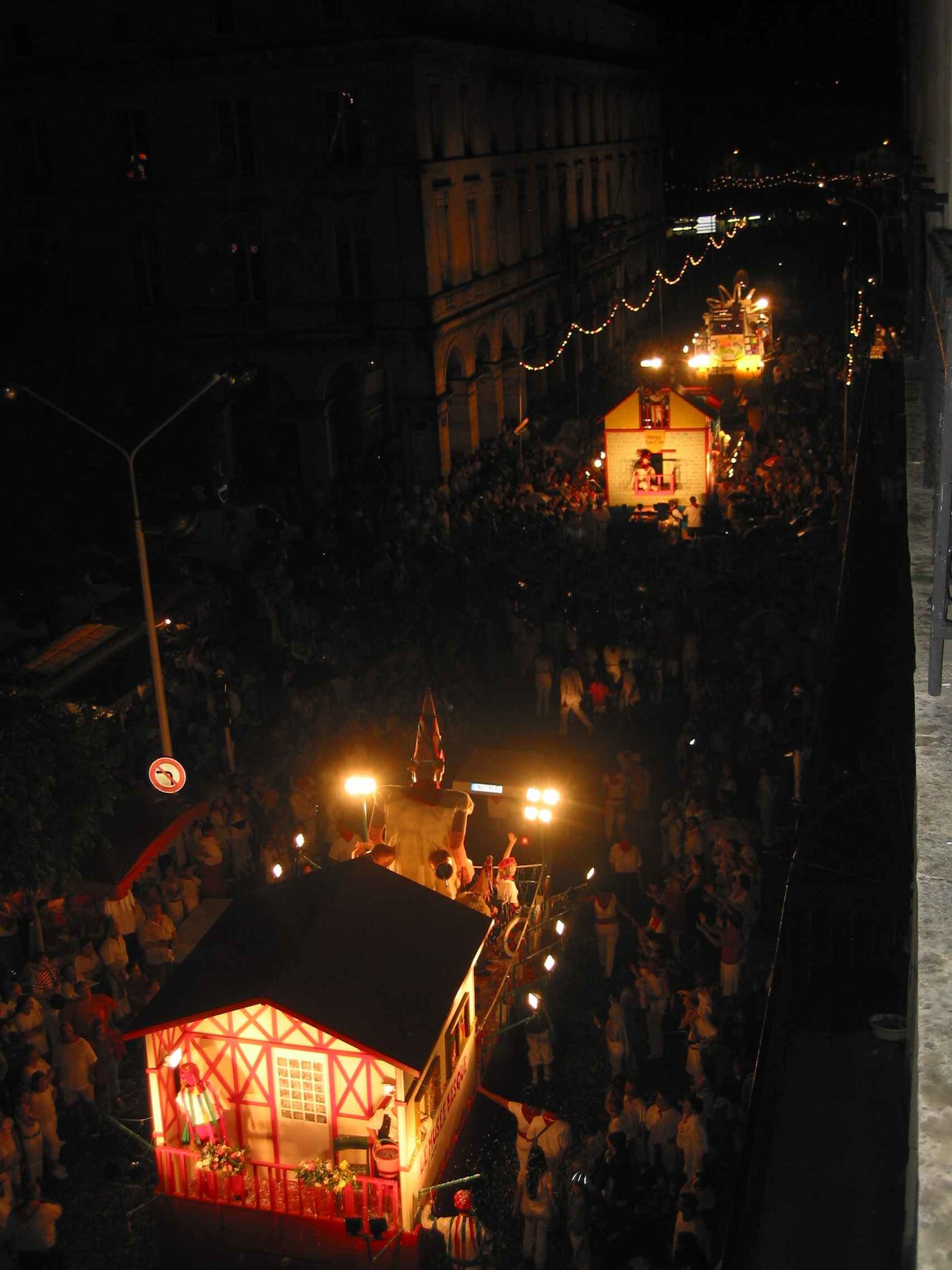
Corso lumineux 2004

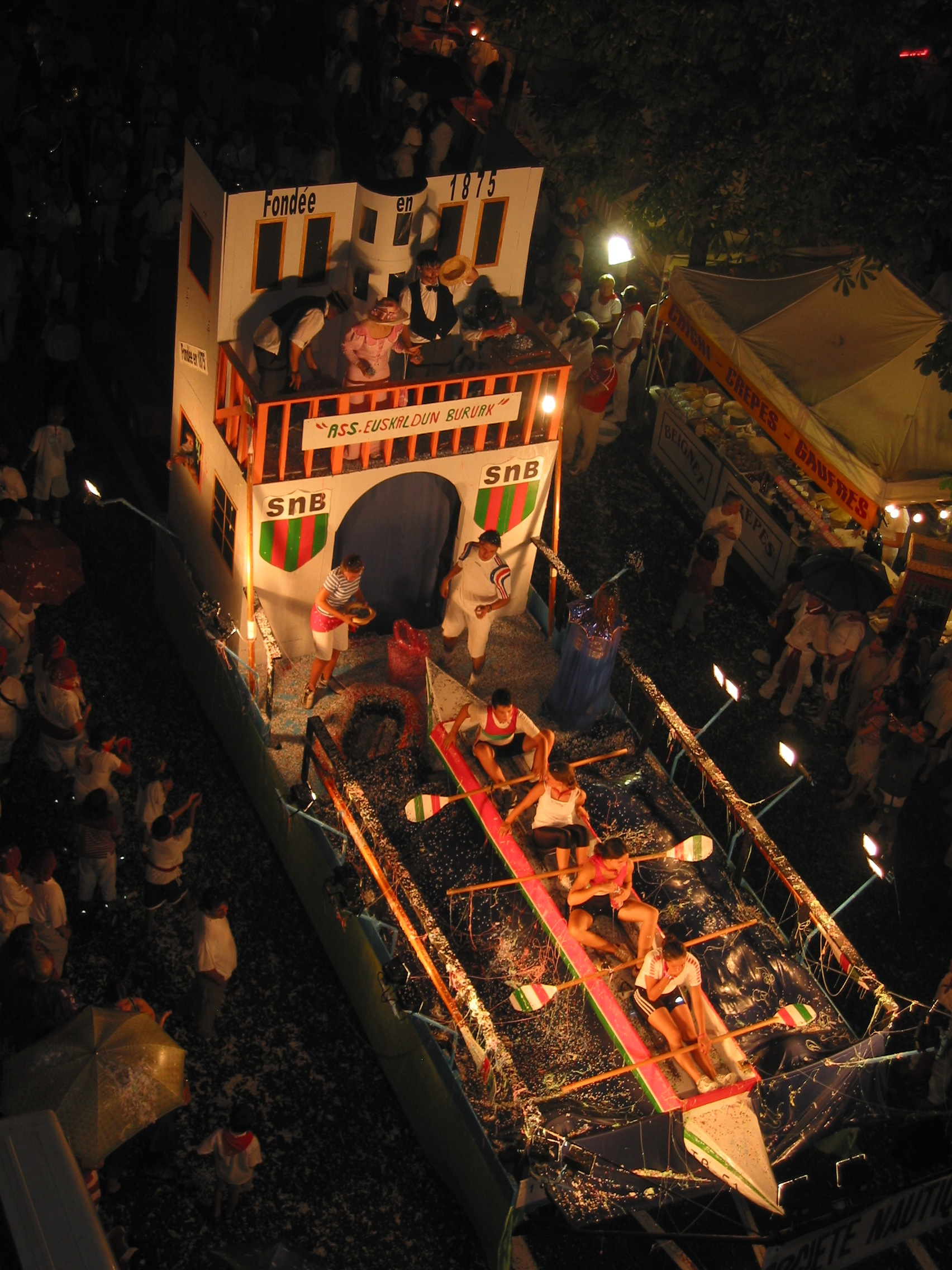
Corso lumineux 2004

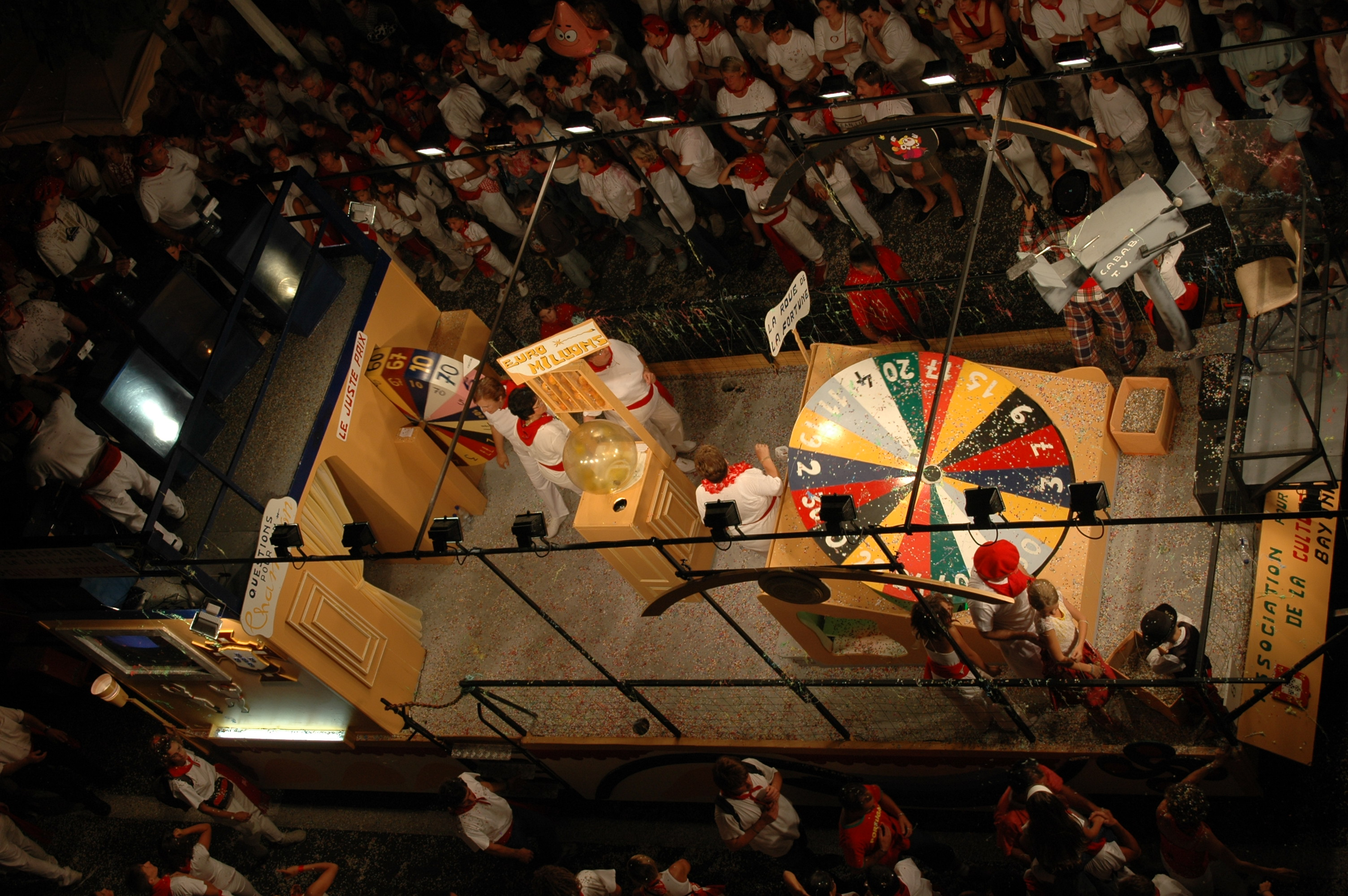
Corso lumineux 2006

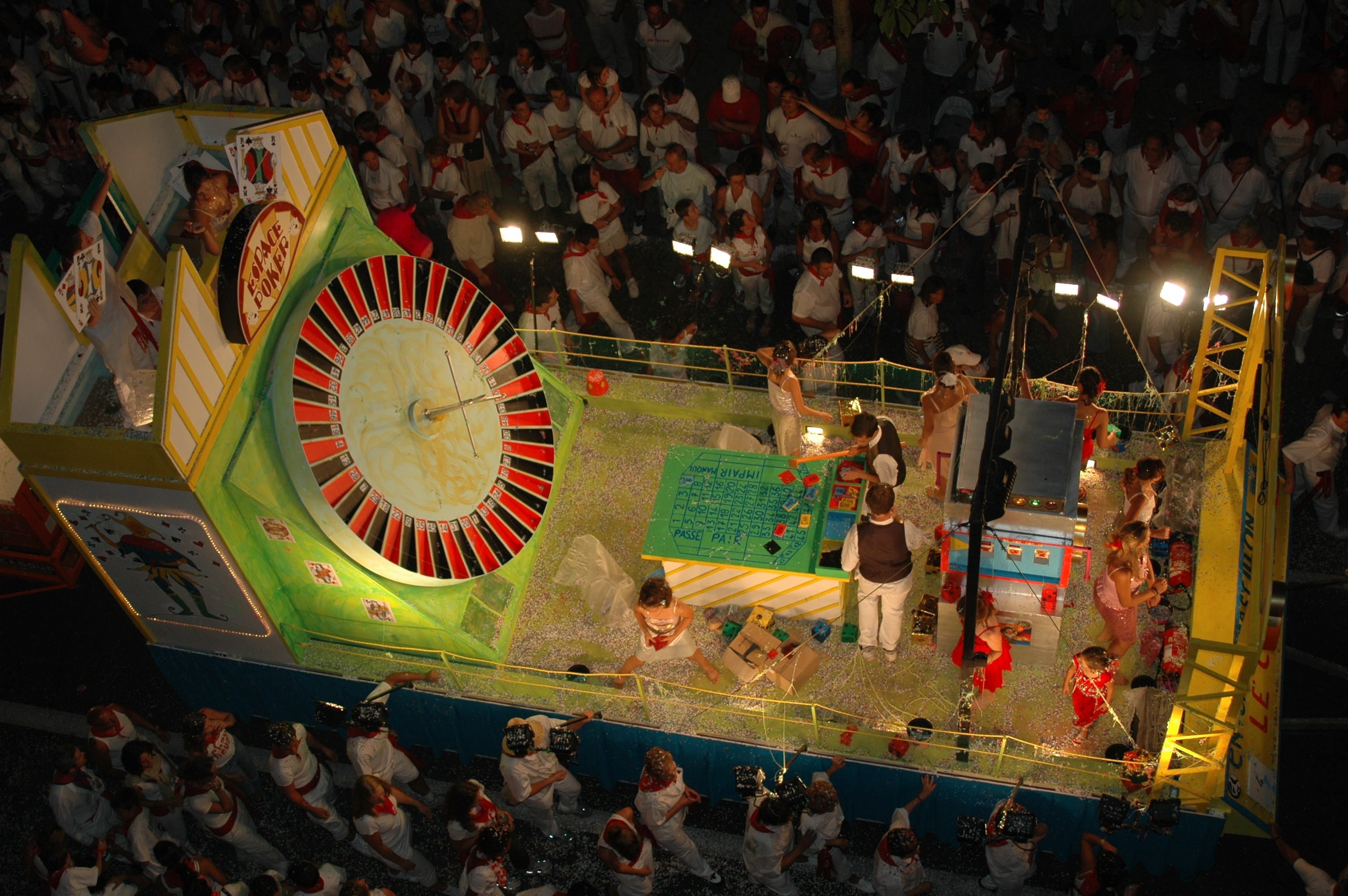
Corso lumineux 2006

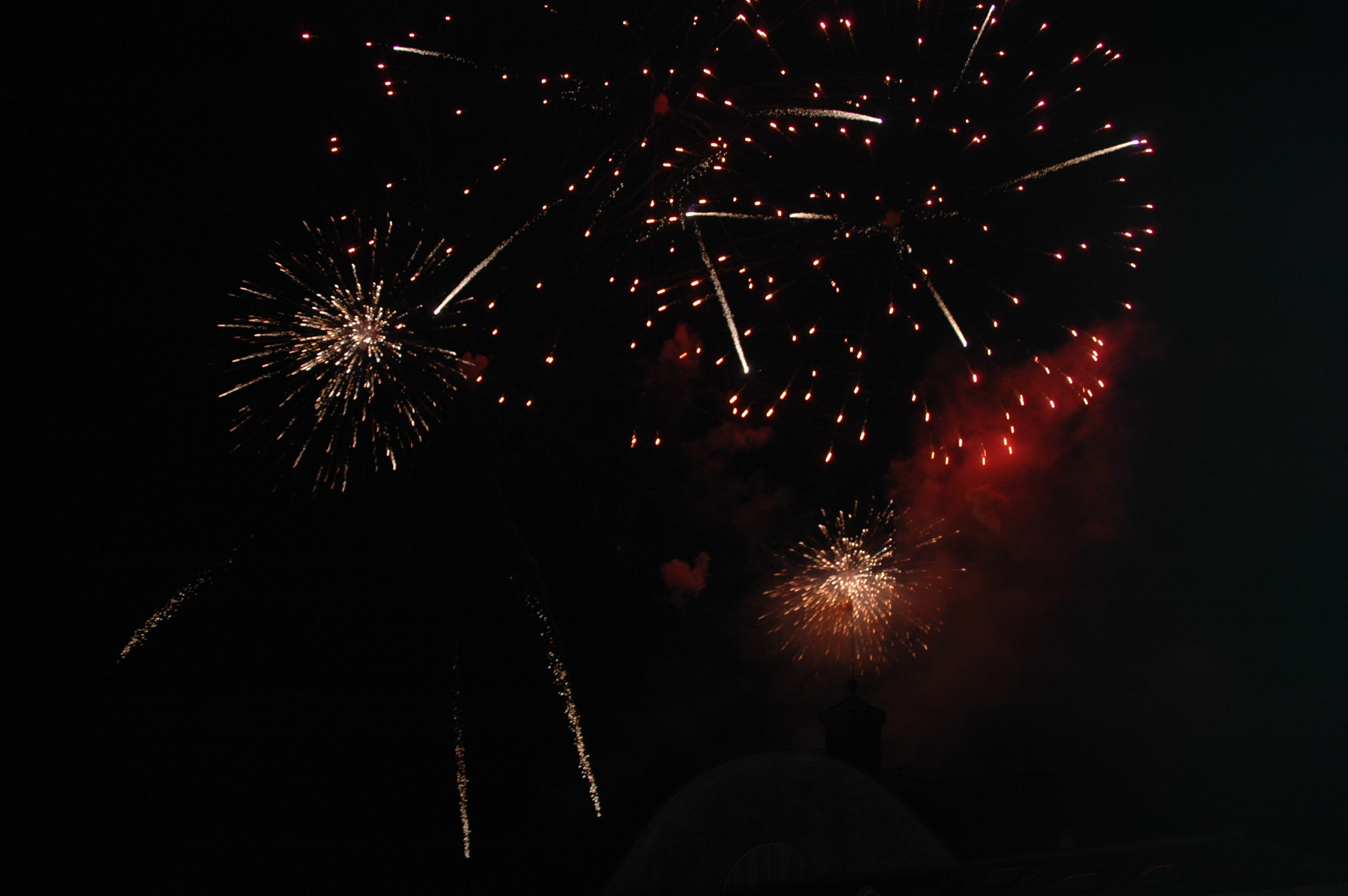
Fêtes 2006, fireworks
