= Stenkovec camp =

Refugee camp for Kosovar Albanians in FYROM, 1999

Stenkovec camps
- Camps established: 2 April, 1999

Government
  - Body: NATO

Population (May 1999)
  - Total: 62,000
  - Stenkovec I: 30,000
  - Stenkovec II: 32,000

The Stenkovec camps were a series of refugee camps established by NATO and UNHCR in April 1999 near Skopje, Republic of Macedonia, meant to accommodate the recent influx of Kosovar Albanian refugees fleeing oppression and ethnic cleansing in Kosovo. The camps became infamous for their poor conditions, for instance the reported police brutality and discrimination against the Albanian refugees by the Macedonian authorities.

The majority of the Albanian refugees left the camps between June and July 1999, after which Stenkovec I was closed. Meanwhile, a new wave of non-Albanian refugees (Serbs and Roma) entered the second camp in September 1999. Finally, Stenkovec II was closed in late 1999, which marked the end of the Stenkovec camps.
