= Alyscamps =

Roman necropolis near Arles, France

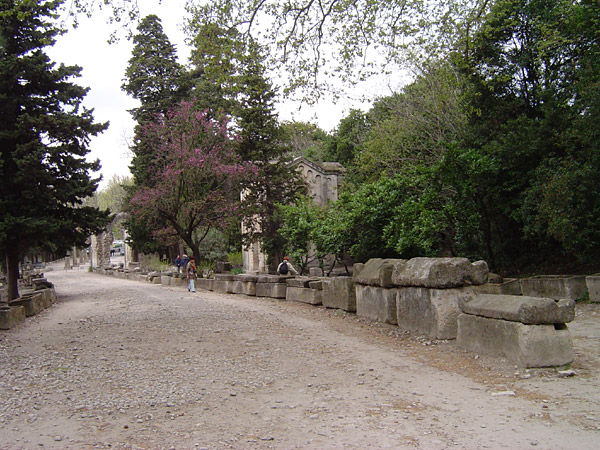
- An alley in the Alyscamps

- Location within France
- 43°40′17″N 04°38′13″E
- Type: Necropolis
- Location: Arles, Bouches-du-Rhône, Provence-Alpes-Côte d'Azur, France

History
- Built: 4th century AD or earlier

UNESCO World Heritage Site
- Type: Cultural
- Criteria: ii, iv
- Designated: 1981 (5th session)
- Part of: Arles, Roman and Romanesque Monuments
- Reference no.: 164
- Region: Europe and North America

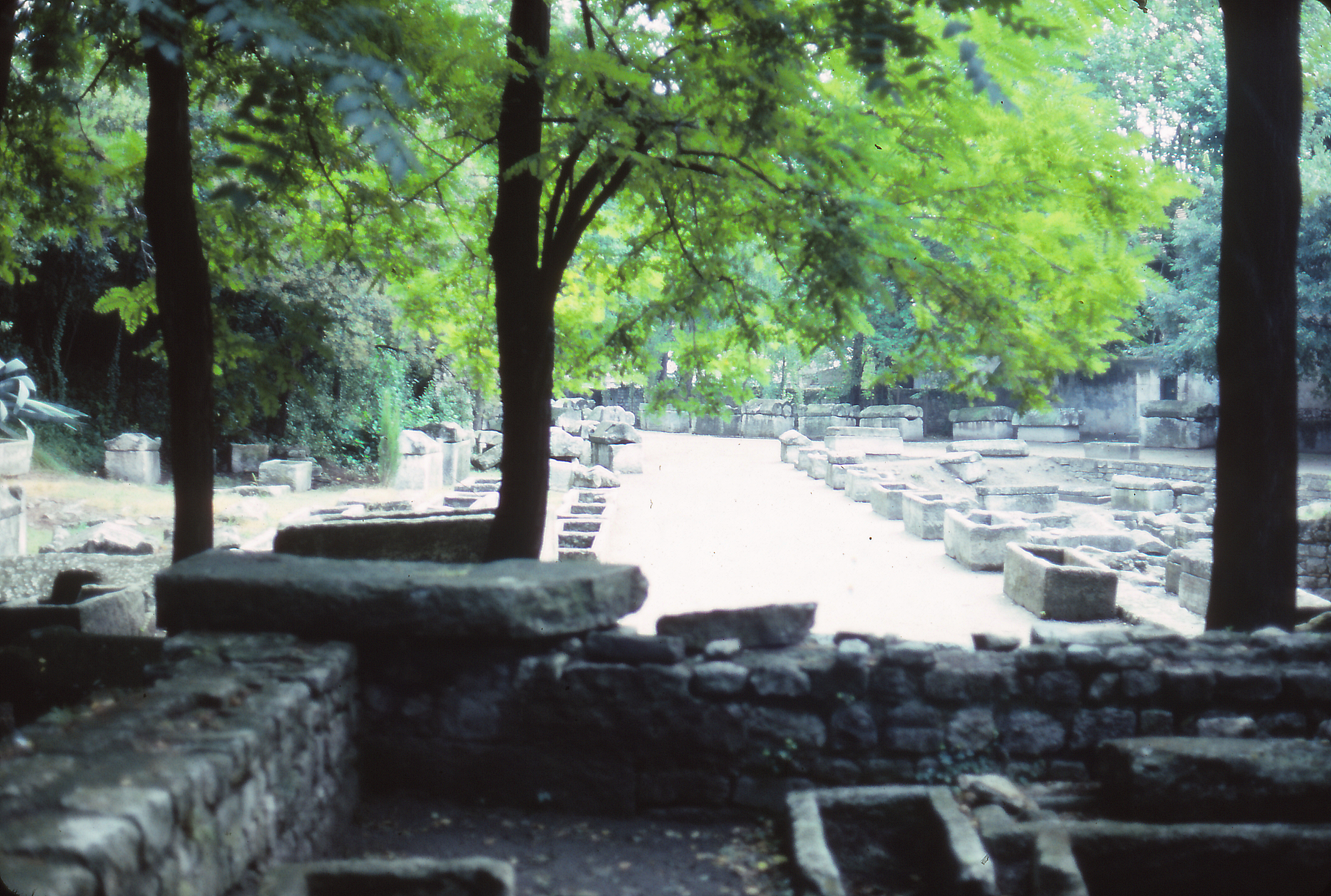
Alyscamps

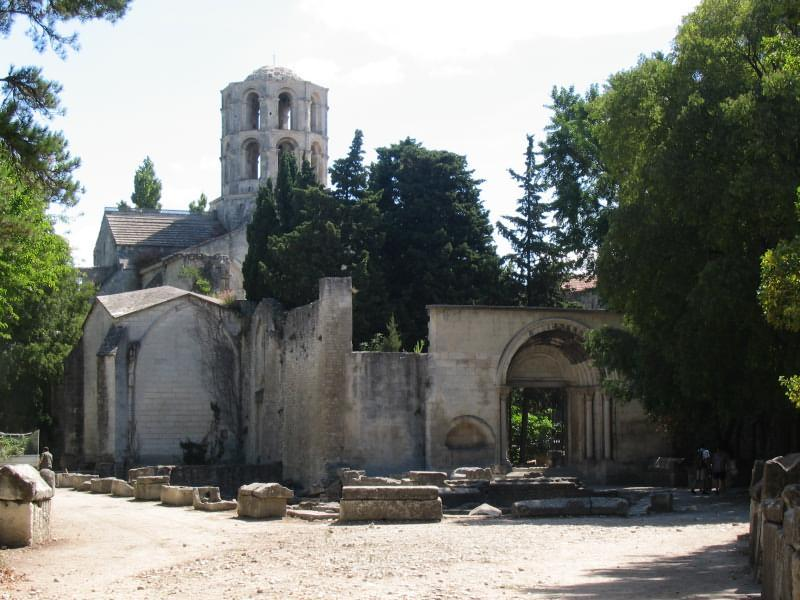
Medieval Church of Saint Honoratus in Les Alyscamps, Arles

The Alyscamps is a large Roman necropolis, which is a short distance outside the walls of the old town of Arles, France. It was one of the most famous necropolises of the ancient world. The name comes from the Provençal Occitan word Aliscamps, which comes from the Latin Elisii Campi (that is, in French, Champs-Élysées; in English Elysian Fields). They were famous in the Middle Ages and are referred to by Ariosto in Orlando Furioso and by Dante in the Inferno.

Roman cities traditionally forbade burials within the city limits. It was therefore common for the roads immediately outside a city to be lined with tombs and mausoleums; the Appian Way outside Rome provides a good example. The Alyscamps was Arles' main burial ground for nearly 1,500 years. It was the final segment of the Aurelian Way leading up to the city gates and was used as a burial ground for well-off citizens, whose memorials ranged from simple sarcophagi to elaborate monuments. In 1981, the Alyscamps was classified a UNESCO World Heritage Site, as part of the Arles, Roman and Romanesque Monuments group.

== History ==
The Alyscamps continued to be used after the city was Christianised in the 4th century. Saint Genesius, a Roman civil servant beheaded in 303 for refusing to follow orders to persecute Christians, was buried there and rapidly became the focus of a cult. Saint Trophimus, possibly the first bishop of Arles, was buried there soon afterwards. It was claimed that Christ himself attended the ceremony, leaving the imprint of his knee on a sarcophagus lid.

The area became a highly desirable place to be buried and tombs soon multiplied. As early as the 4th century there were already several thousand tombs, necessitating the stacking of sarcophagi three layers deep. Burial in the Alyscamps became so desirable that bodies were shipped there from all over Europe, with the Rhône boatmen making a healthy profit from the transportation of coffins to Arles.

The Alyscamps continued to be used well into medieval times, although the removal of Saint Trophimus' relics to the cathedral in 1152 reduced its prestige. During the Renaissance the necropolis was systematically looted, with city councillors giving sarcophagi as gifts to distinguished visitors and local people using funerary stones as building material. It was further damaged by the arrival of the railway and a canal in the 19th century, both of which sliced across the site. In late October 1888 Vincent van Gogh and Paul Gauguin chose the Alyscamps as the first site for their expeditions where they painted side by side; by this time it was a remnant of its former self. It has since been somewhat restored as an open-air museum. In his final book Caesar's Vast Ghost, Lawrence Durrell recommends the Alyscamps for its beauty and atmosphere; he writes: "It is unique in its charm."

== Conservation ==
The better of the remaining sarcophagi are now on display in the Musée de l'Arles et de la Provence antiques, which has one of the best collections of Roman sarcophagi to be found anywhere outside Rome itself.

== Gallery ==
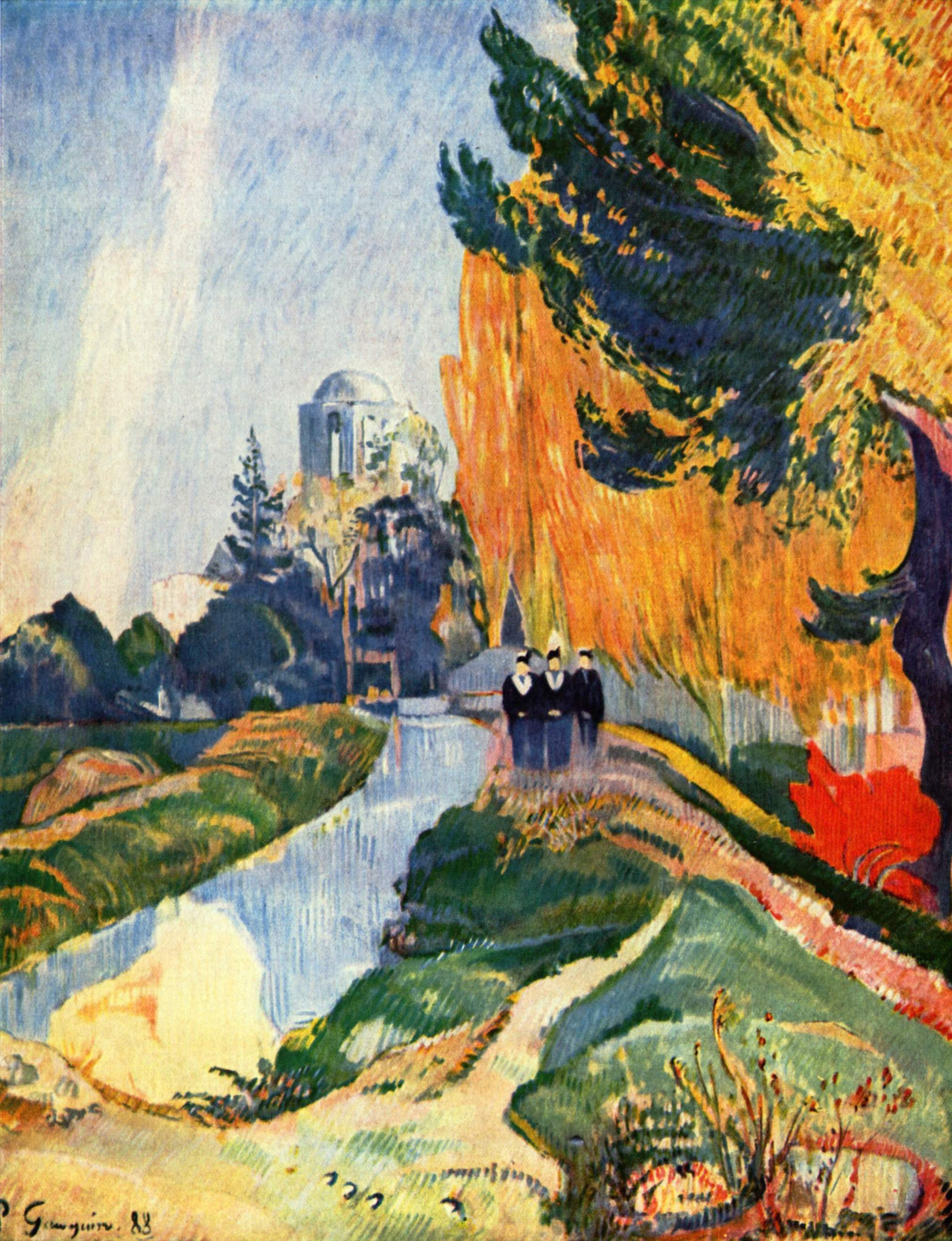
Les Alyscamps, Paul Gauguin, 1888

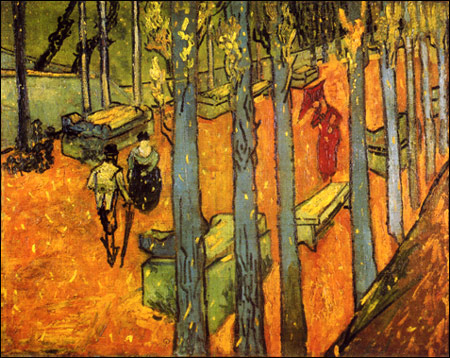
Falling Autumn Leaves, Vincent van Gogh, 1888

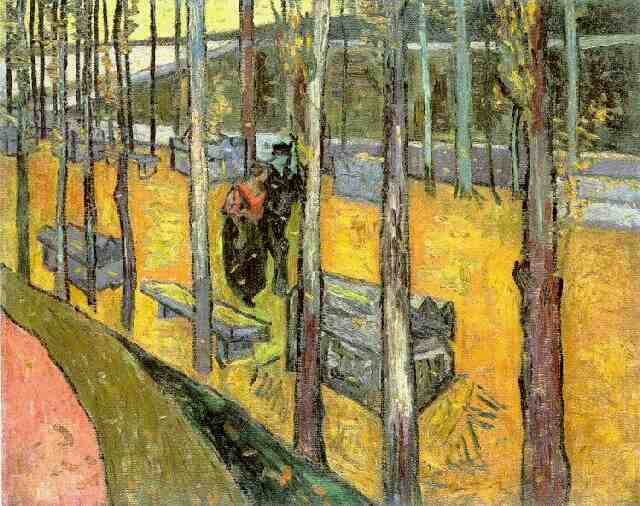
Falling Autumn Leaves one of a pair of paintings, Vincent van Gogh, 1888

== See also ==
- Ancient Roman architecture
