= Les Alyscamps =

Painting by Vincent van Gogh

Les Alyscamps (F569)
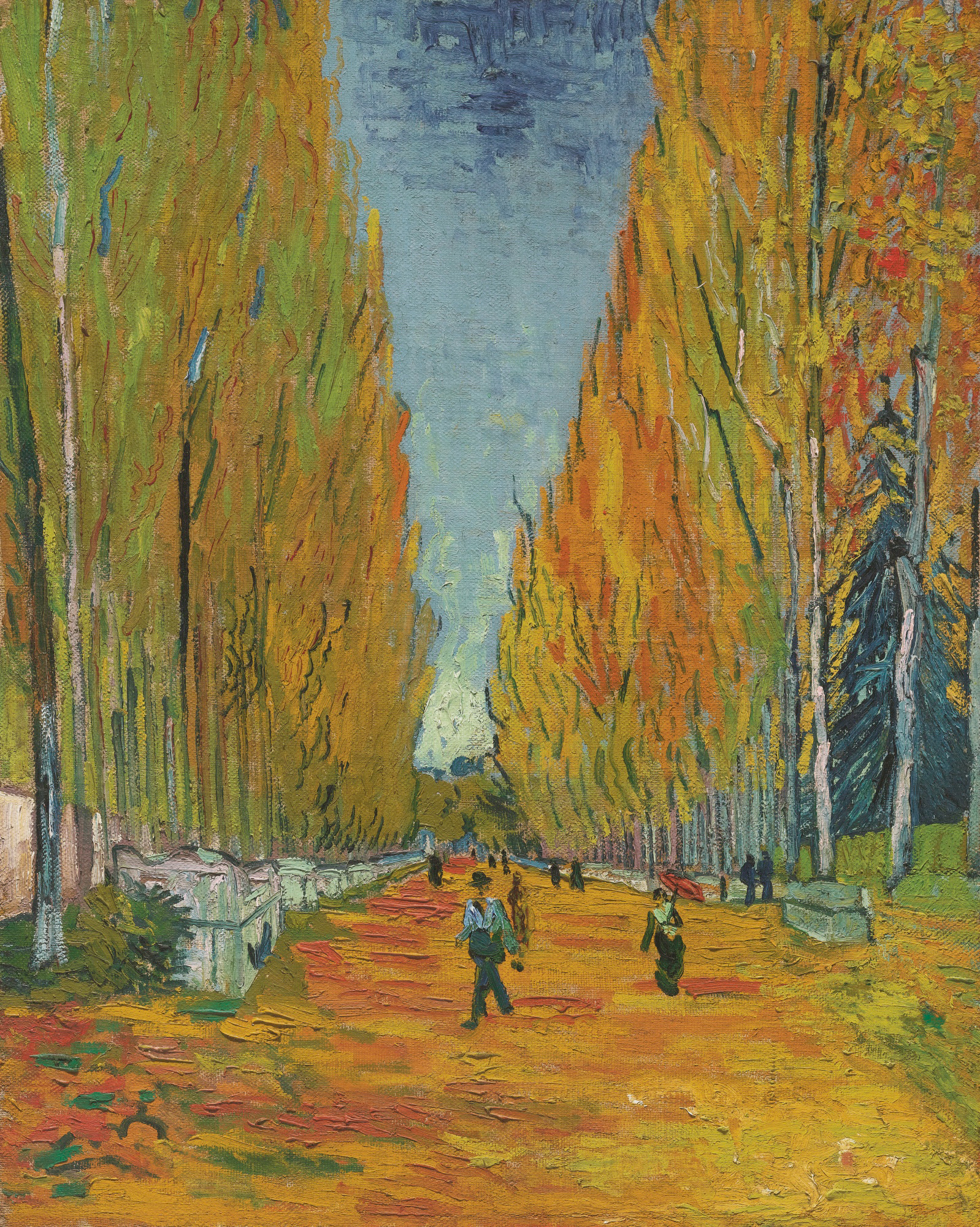
- Artist: Vincent van Gogh
- Year: 1888
- Catalogue: F569; JH1623
- Medium: Oil on canvas
- Dimensions: 92 cm × 73.5 cm (36 in × 28.9 in)
- Location: Private collection

Les Alyscamps (F568)
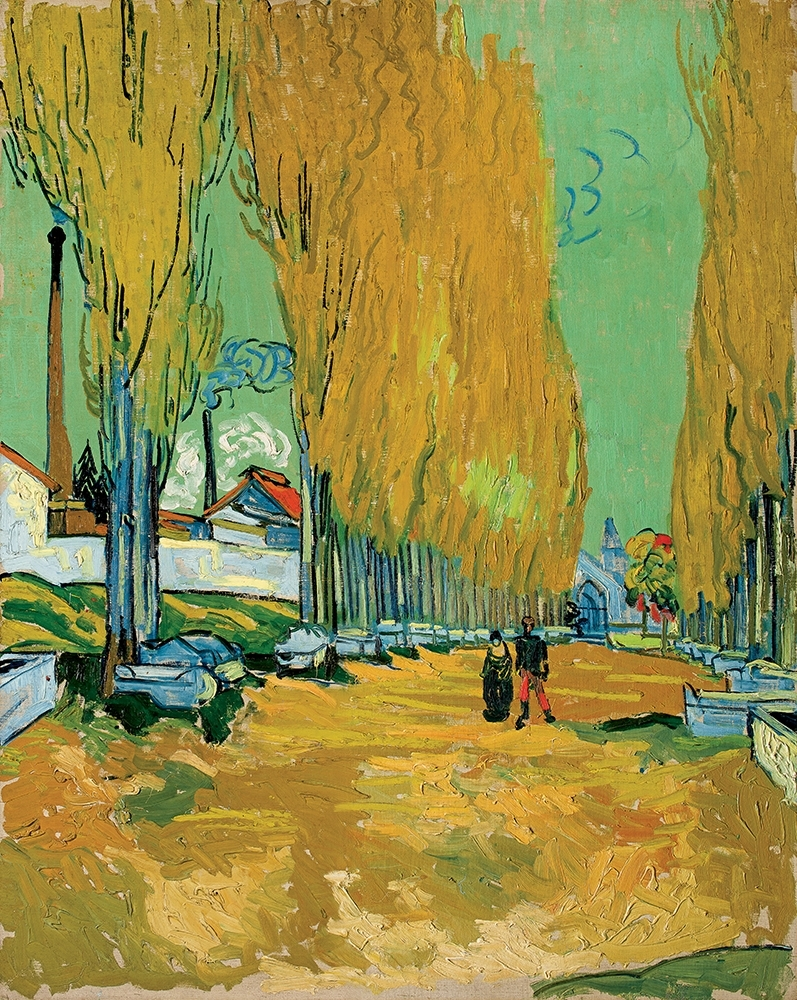
- Artist: Vincent van Gogh
- Year: 1888
- Catalogue: F568; JH1622
- Medium: Oil on canvas
- Dimensions: 92 cm × 73.5 cm (36 in × 28.9 in)
- Location: Basil and Elise Goulandris Foundation, Athens, Greece

Les Alyscamps (or 'L'Allée des Alyscamps') is a pair of paintings ("pendants") by Dutch painter Vincent van Gogh. Painted in 1888 in Arles, France, it depicts autumnal scenes in the Alyscamps, an ancient Roman necropolis in Arles which is lined with poplars and stone sarcophagi.

Van Gogh also made another pair of paintings, Falling Autumn Leaves and Paul Gauguin made his own version of Les Alycamps.

== Auction ==
One of the paintings was auctioned in November 2003, selling for $11,767,500 at an auction in New York despite predictions that it might fetch between $12 and $18 million. The painting was sold again on May 5, 2015, for the sum of $66.3 million.

== Les Alyscamps ==
Following months of correspondence, Paul Gauguin joined Van Gogh in Arles in October 1888. Both were intent on depicting a "non-naturalist landscape". The paintings are of the first works that Van Gogh and Gauguin painted following Gauguin's arrival.

Van Gogh and Gauguin visited an ancient Roman necropolis, "Les Alyscamps", which had been built by the Romans outside city walls. Over time the grounds were overtaken by factories and the railroad, leaving the Allee des Tombeaux, (the avenue of tombs), a lane of shady poplar trees that led to a Romanesque chapel. This lane was known throughout France as a lovers' lane (the women of Arles celebrated for their beauty). The couples depicted in the painting are taking a romantic stroll in the evening and it was this aspect of the scene that especially attracted the artists' attention.

The two artists painted some identical subjects to compare their work with each other and chose the site of the Alyscamps to paint and compare. They produced several works, including this painting, Van Gogh's Falling Autumn Leaves (Les Alyscamps) and Gauguin's Alyscamps.

== The paintings ==
The pair of paintings were made by Van Gogh and Gauguin soon after Gauguin arrived in Arles. The painting portrays an ancient Roman cemetery, "Les Alyscamps" or "Elysian Fields" which were located south east of the Roman city walls. Through careful analysis it appears that the two men worked together at Les Alyscamps between October 28 and 31, just before an onslaught of heavy rains that forced them indoors. Van Gogh painted four views, this Les Alyscamps pair and the pair of Falling Autumn Leaves paintings. Gauguin produced two paintings.

== Van Gogh's other Les Alyscamps paintings ==
Van Gogh made another pair of paintings at Les Alyscamps called Falling Autumn Leaves.

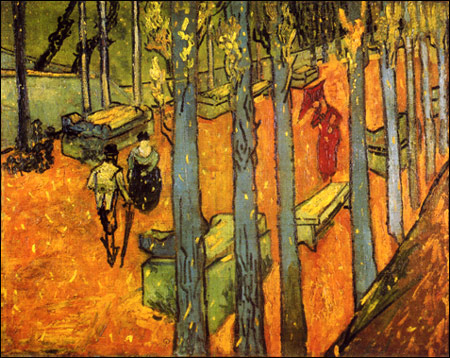
Falling Autumn Leaves
1888
Kröller-Müller Museum, Otterlo (F486)

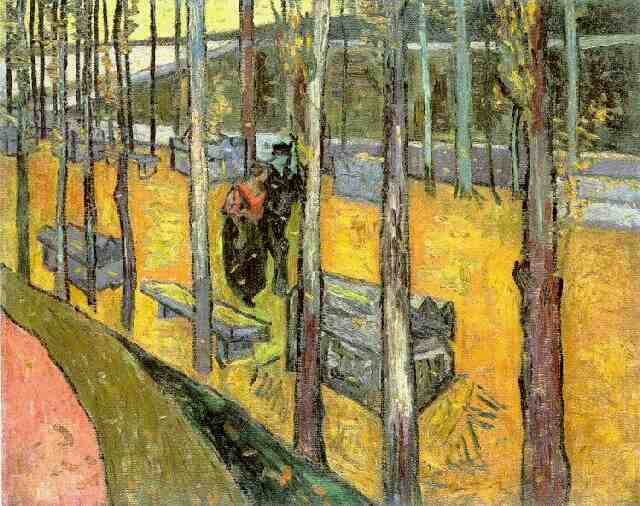
Falling Autumn Leaves
1888
Private collection (F487)

== Gauguin's paintings ==
For his painting of Les Alyscamps, painted on the same day as Van Gogh's, Gauguin chose a different vantage point from Van Gogh, and excluded any reference to ancient sarcophagi.

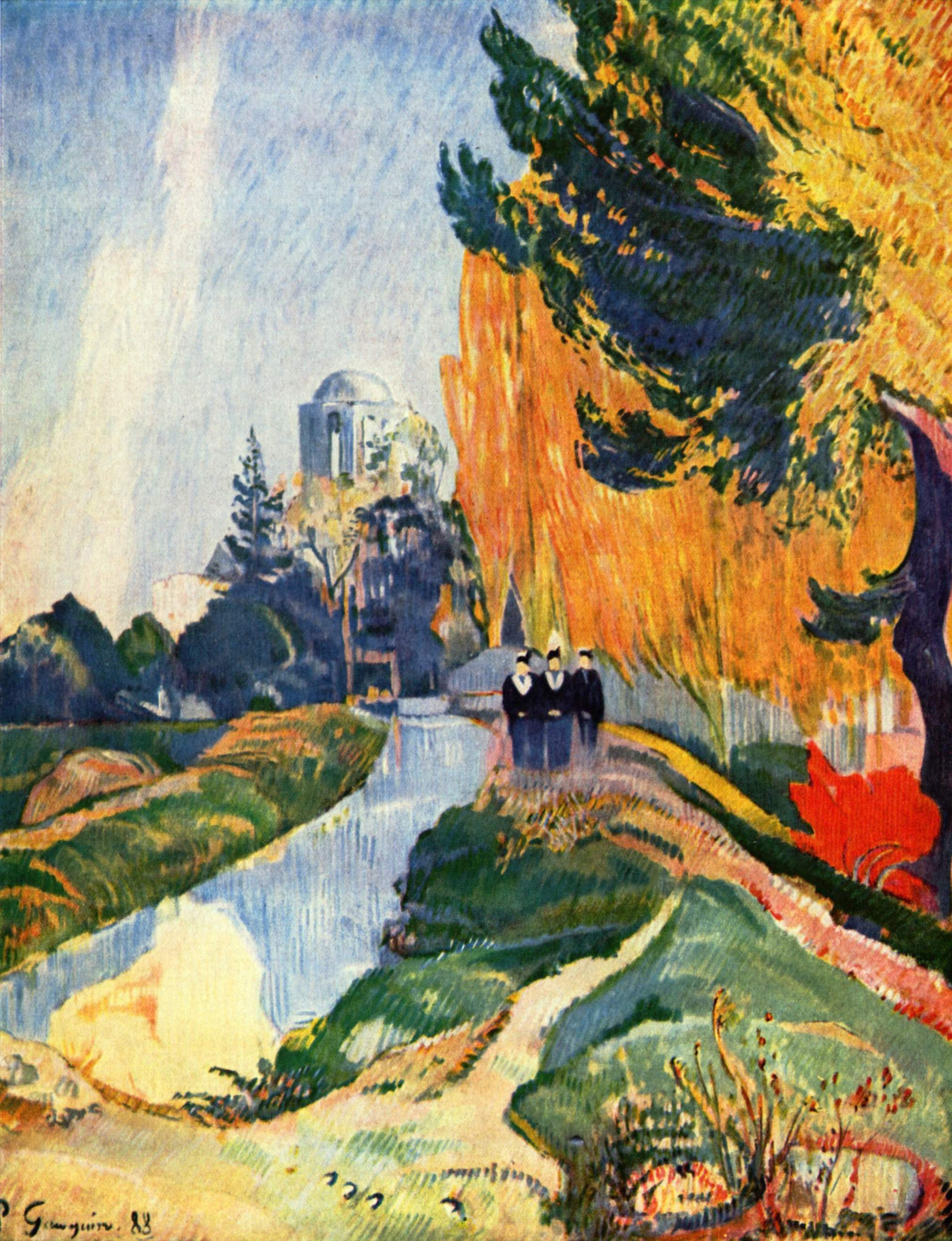
Paul Gauguin, Les Alyscamps
1888
Musée d'Orsay, Paris

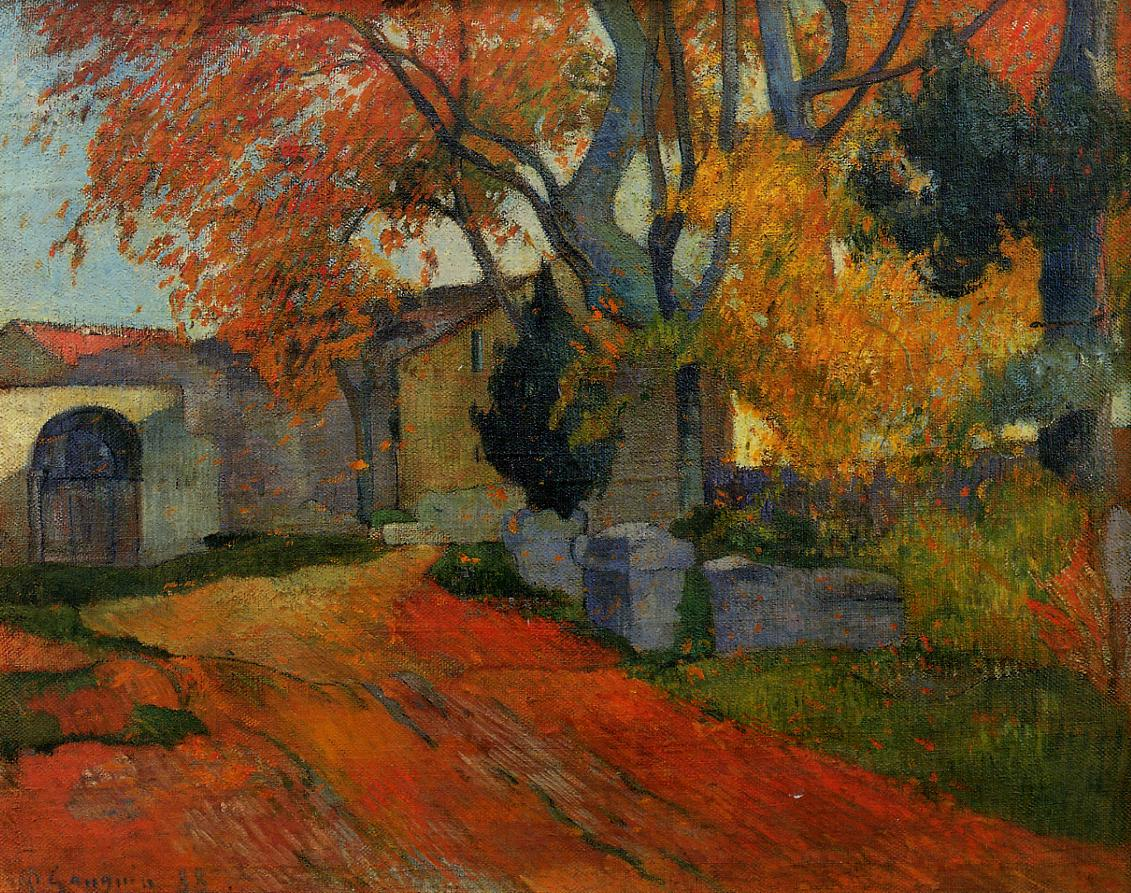
Paul Gauguin, Allée des Alyscamps
1888
Seiji Togo Memorial Sompo Japan Museum of Art, Tokyo

== See also ==
- List of works by Vincent van Gogh
- List of most expensive paintings
