= Alkedo =

Roman shipwreck

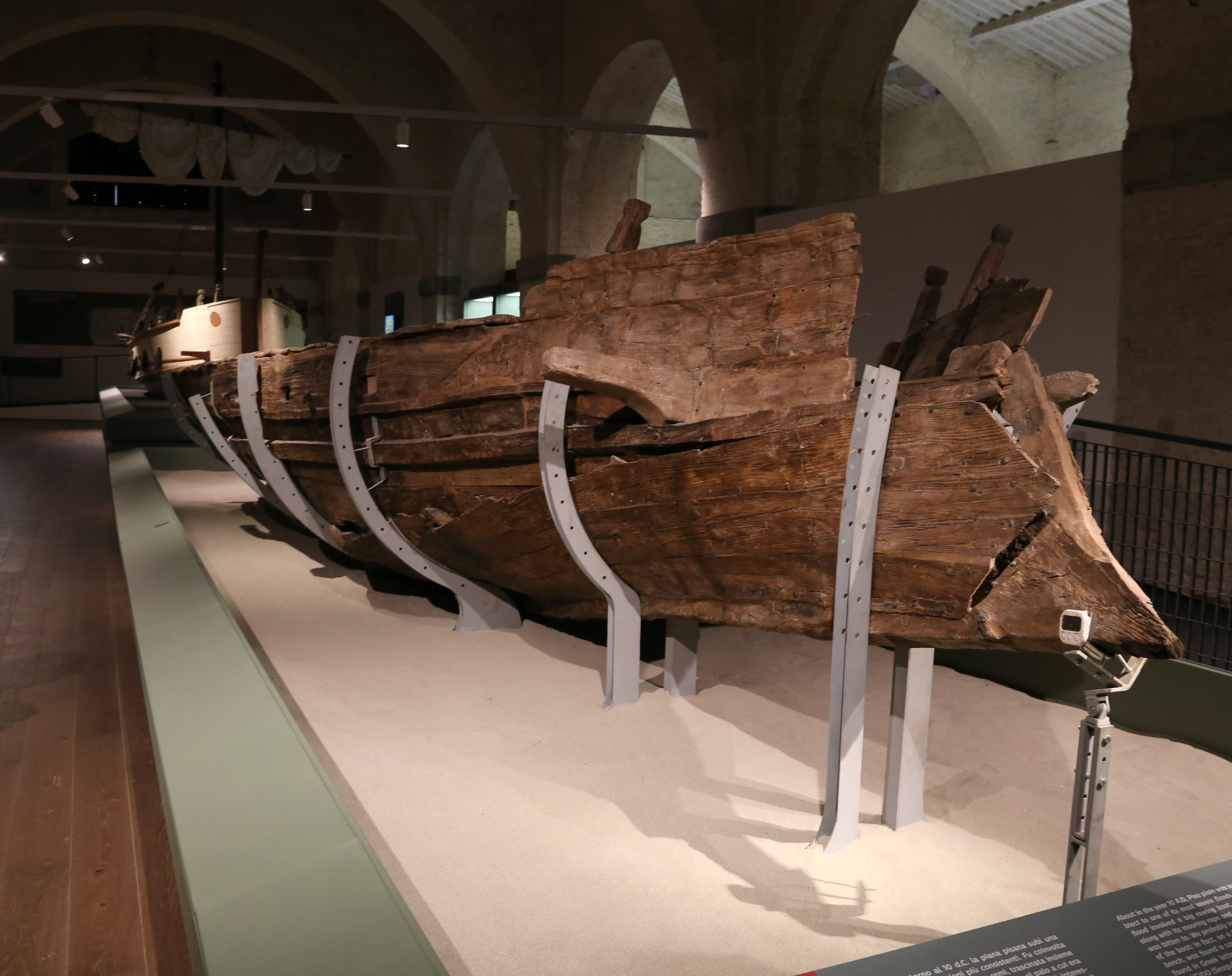
- Alkedo on display in the Museum of Ancient Ships

History
- Name: Alkedo
- Status: Museum exhibit

General characteristics
- Length: 22 m (72 ft)

Alkedo is a preserved Roman shipwreck that sank in the 1st century AD, and was discovered during a construction project in Pisa, Italy.

== Excavation ==
In 1998 construction began on a control center for the Rome-Genoa train line next to Pisa San Rossore. During the project, a series of shipwrecks numbering about thirty were discovered, including Alkedo.

== Characteristics ==
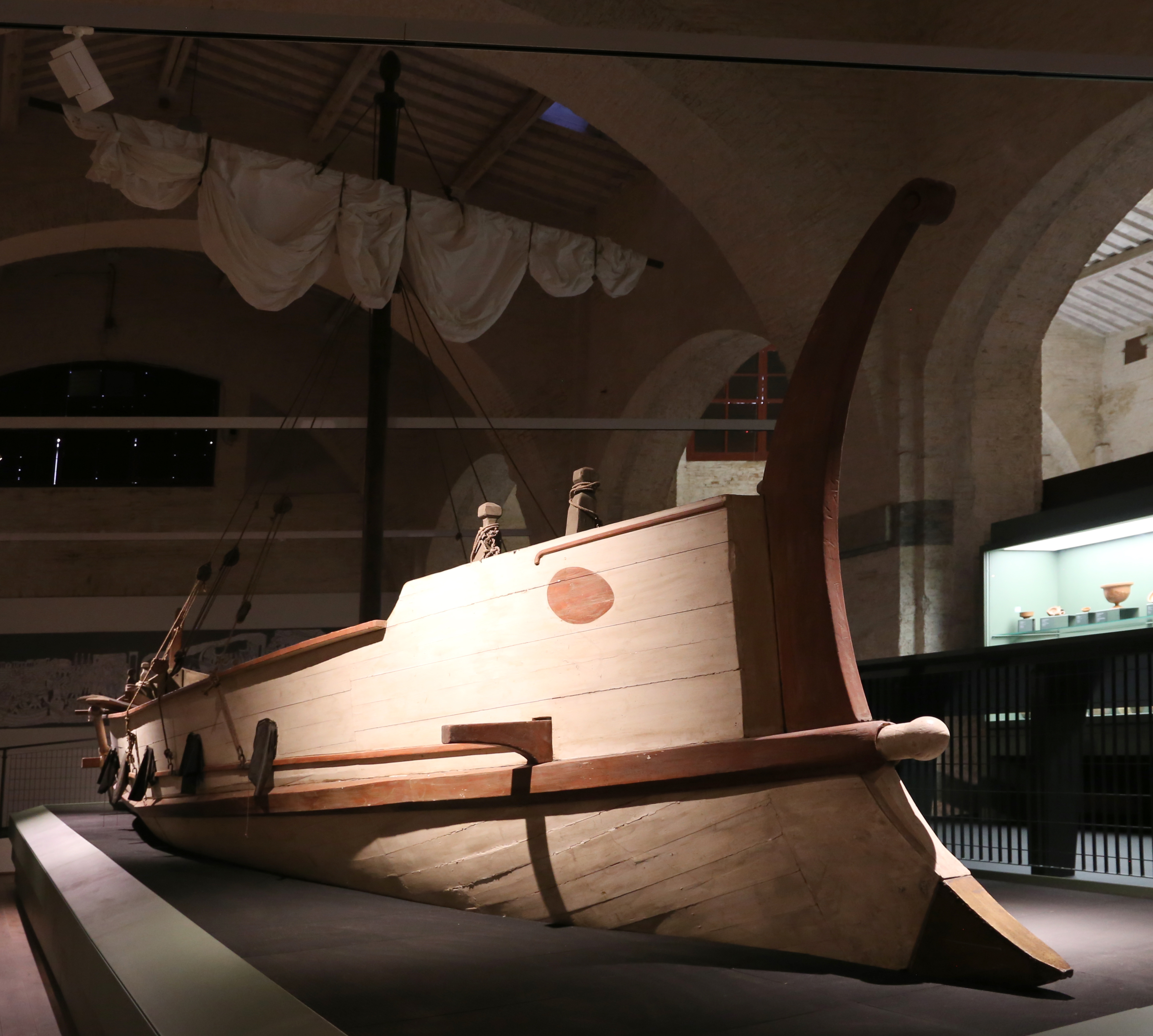
Replica of Alkedo at the Museum of Ancient Ships

Constructed of holm oak and pine, with an insert in the bow made of oak, it was rowed by twelve oarsmen, and used as a pleasure craft. (Note: It may have been used as a patrol craft and later converted into a pleasure boat) The ship's nearly intact hull has been preserved well enough to make out the inscription on a tablet nailed to one of the rower's benches; the inscription states the five letters that make up the word "ALK (E) DO". Translated from Latin to mean "seagull", which is thought to be the name of the ship. Traces of red and white were visible on the external sides of the ship during its excavation, which indicates it was once painted. It is displayed next to a full size replica in the Museum of Ancient Ships in Pisa, Italy.

== See also ==
- List of surviving ancient ships
- Arles Rhône 3
- Marsala Ship
- Roman ship of Marausa
