= Head of Arles =

Roman copy of 4th-century BC sculpture

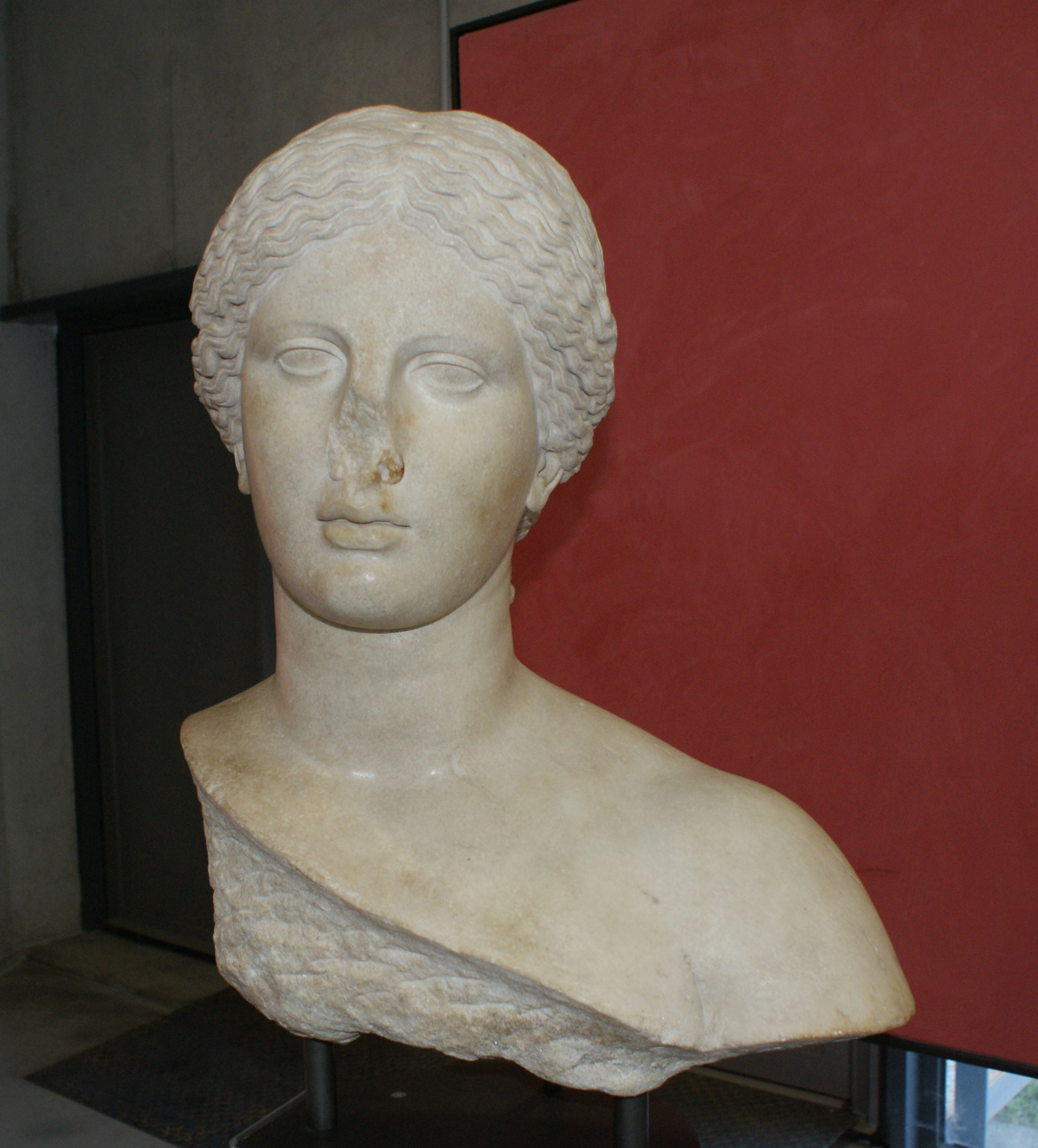
The Head of Arles probably decorated the ancient theatre in a similar manner to the Venus of Arles (Musée de l'Arles et de la Provence antiques)

The Head of Arles (French: Tête d'Arles), formerly known also as the Head of Livia (Tête de Livie) or the Head with the broken nose (Tête au nez cassé) is a fragment of a Roman marble statue in two parts, of which only the bust remains, which probably depicts Venus (Aphrodite) and was discovered in the ruins of the Ancient Theatre of Arles in 1823 during the removal of accreted material from the theatre. The Head of Arles represents an iconographic type called Aspremont-Lynden/Arles. It is now part of the permanent exhibition of the Musée de l'Arles et de la Provence antiques with the inventory number FAN.92.00.405.

== Fragment of a theatrical decoration ==
The sculpture was originally two separate pieces, joined at an angle across the chest in a manner which is also seen elsewhere. The bust which is preserved today, with a height of 57 cm was probably inserted into an entirely clothed body, with her posture causing the chiton to slip off the left shoulder. As was usual, the statue was painted and the hair in particular was probably gilded.

The bust was discovered in 1823 at the same time as a bas-relief representing Apollo and Marsyas in a trench dug in a road near the location of the ancient theatre of Arles. Given the location of its discovery, the statue was taken to be part of the decoration of the postscaenium which decorated the stage building of the ancient theatre, probably located in one of the niches which flanked the royal gate (valva regia), mirroring the Venus of Arles, which was found near this location some two centuries earlier and together framing the monumental statue of Augustus in the guise of Apollo, to whom the theatre was dedicated. Like the Venus of Arles, the Head of Arles has a hole at the front of head which probably allowed the attachment of a metal star or diadem, a fact which suggests that the two statues were originally designed as a pair.

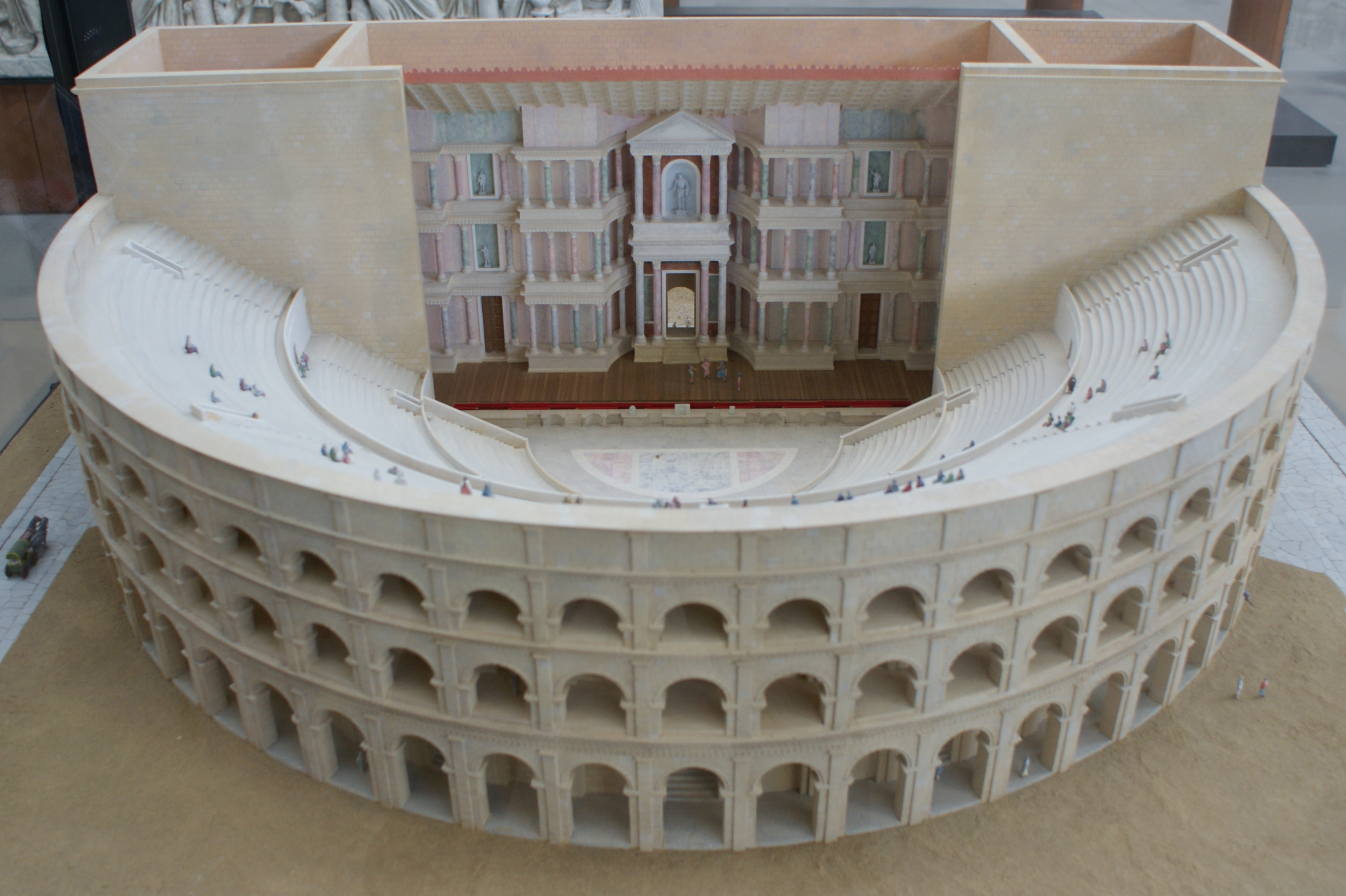
Model of the Ancient Theatre of Arles giving an idea of the postscaenium (Musée de l'Arles et de la Provence antiques)

The two statues, with that of Augustus, have formed part of the permanent collection of the Musée de l'Arles antique since its creation in 1995. Before that, they were displayed in the Musée lapidaire d'Arles. The Head of Arles, also known as the Noseless Head (Tête sans nez) was presented at the exhibition of fine arts in Marseille in 1861.

== Dating and classification ==
On account of the "exceptional" artistic quality that is recognisable in this bust, the study of the head has drawn connections with the Greek statues of the end of the fifth century or beginning of the fourth century BC. Particular features which are noted include the bust's banded tresses tightly tied in a low bun, the heaviness of the lower part of the face and the deep shading of the area around the eyes. Cécile Carrier argues that it is probably based on a model which pre-dates Praxiteles, agreeing with the position earlier advanced by Salomon Reinach. Other authors, like Antonio Corso, associate the bust with the sculpture of Phryne of Thespiae carved by Praxiteles. Either way, all scholars agree that the Head of Arles itself is Roman copy, made in the Antonine period at the latest and most likely in the Augustan period (first century AD).

The Head was formerly identified as a depiction of the Empress Livia, wife of Augustus who was later deified (as a result of which it was called the "Head of Livia") but it follows an iconographic type which is more closely associated with Venus Genetrix, the victorious goddess invoked by Julius Caesar.

The use of the type of Venus Genetrix can be interpreted as a gesture of filial piety on the part of Augustus for his adoptive father, but there is also a more local symbolism - a homage to Caesar's foundation of the Colony of Arles, stressed by Augustus when he renamed the city Colonia Julia Paterna. Like the other two statues which decorated the postscaenium of the ancient theatre (the deified Augustus in the role of Apollo and the Venus of Arles which may represent Venus Victrix) the Head of Arles conforms to the official iconographic style which was established after the end of the Roman Republic and propagated especially in the Augustan period.

The Aspremont-Lynden/Arles type, of which the Head of Arles is the best example, includes a number of Roman replicas of Greek statues of which only the heads are preserved. The other examples are:

- The Aspremont-Lynden Head at Vienne,
- The Head of the Tower of the Winds in Athens,
- The Head of Chios at Boston,
- The Female Head at Civitavecchia.

Some other connections are possible, such as the Kaufmann Head (Louvre) and the Leconfield Head (Petworth House). If the Head of Arles does derive from a pre-Praxitelean model connections can also be made with the Head with the broken nose of the Aphrodite of Cnidus type (also in the Louvre) and the Martres-Tolosane Head (Toulouse).

== Bibliography ==
- (in French) Fernand Benoit, Le musée lapidaire d'Arles, Henri Laurens éditeur, 1936
- Cécile Carrier
  - (in French) Programmes iconographiques dans les monuments publics de Gaulle Narbonnaise (Ier siècle av. J. C. - IIe siècle après J. C.), Doctoral thesis, Université de Provence, Aix-Marseille 1, 2000 (Supervised by Pierre Gros)
  - (in French) "Sculptures augustéennes du théâtre d'Arles" Revue archéologique de Narbonnaise, 2005, volume 38, pp. 374–377. (Available online).
- Jacques Joseph and Jean-François Champollion, Bulletin des sciences historiques, antiquité, philologie, Journal des débats, 5 March 1826, Vol. 5, Paris, Imprimerie de Fain, 1826, p. 301.
- Antonio Corso, "The triad of Thespiae" in The art of Praxiteles. The development of Praxiteles'workshop and its cultural tradition until the sculptor's acme (364–1 BC), Rome, L'Erma de Bretchneider, 2004, pp. 257–280.
- (in French) Francis Croissant, "Une Aphrodite méconnue du début du IVe siècle," Bulletin de correspondance hellénique, 1971, Vol. 95-1, pp. 65–107 (Persée.fr Available online)
- (in French) Marius Chaumelin, Les Trésors d’art de la Provence exposés à Marseille en 1861, Paris, 1862.
- Jean Julien Estrangin, Études archéologiques, historiques et statistiques sur Arles, Aubin éditeur, 1838, especially p. 116–118 (Available online)
- Jules Formigé, "Note sur la Vénus d'Arles," Comptes-rendus de l'Académie des Inscriptions et Belles-Lettres 39 (1911), especially p. 663. (Persée.fr Available online)
- Louis Jacquemin, Monographie du théâtre antique d'Arles, Typographie Dumas et Dayre, Arles, tome II, Chapitre VI, 1863, p. 299, 371 & 382 (Available online)
- (in German) Hugh Lauter, "Der praxitelische Kopf Athen, Nationalmuseum 1762," Antike Plastik, 19, 1988, p. 21–29
- (in French) Charles Picard, Manuel d'archéologue grecque. La sculpture. Tome 3 : Période classique, IV^{e}, Paris, 1948–1966, 4 vol., p. 486–488
- Salomon Reinach, "Recueil de têtes antiques idéales ou idéalisées," Gazette des Beaux-Arts, 1903, pl. 136 & p. 105
- Brunilde Sismondo Ridgway, "The Aphrodite of Arles," American Journal of Archæology, vol. 80-2, 1976, p. 153–154
