= Arles Rhône 3 =

Ancient shipwreck

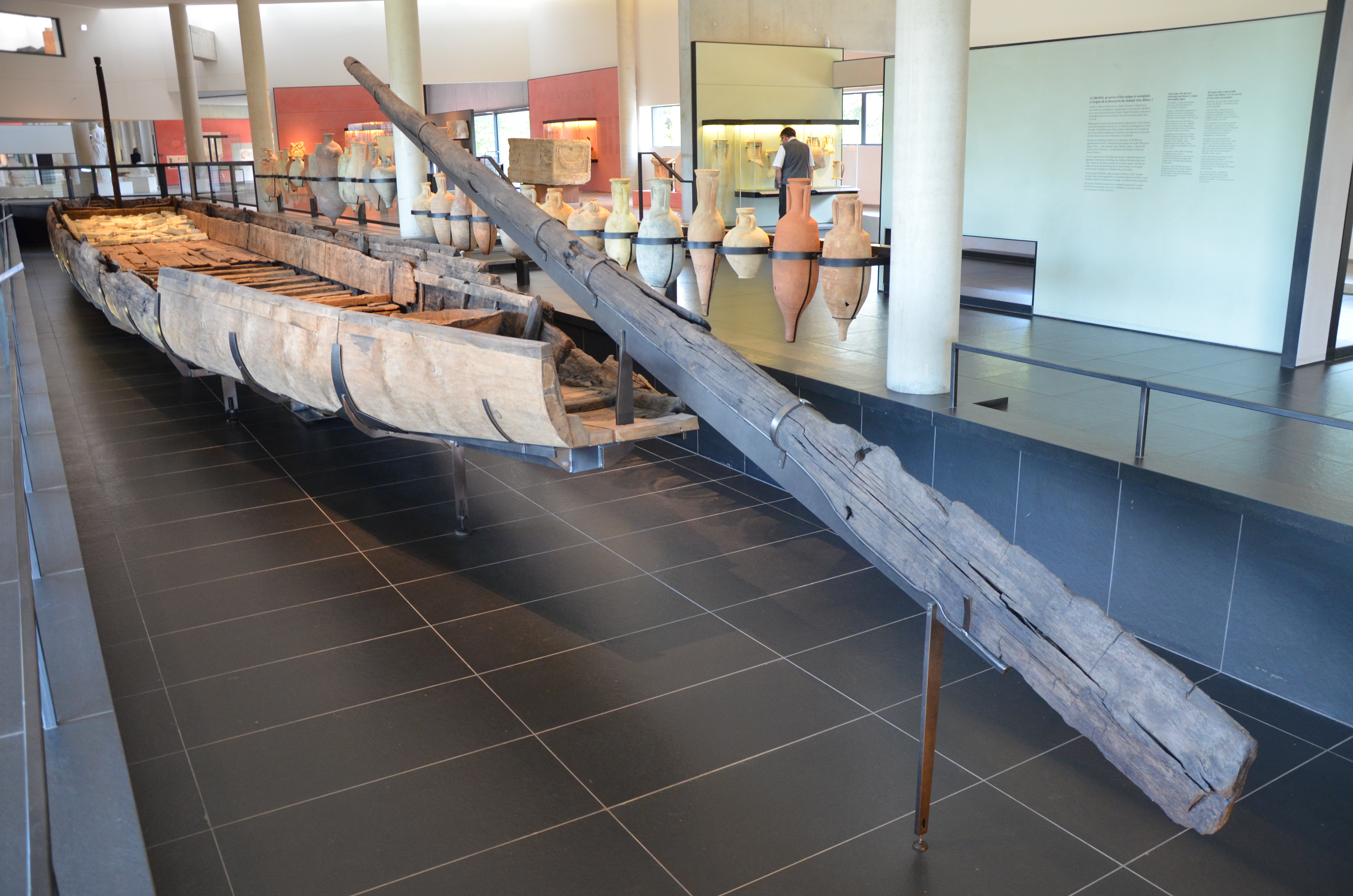
Arles Rhône 3 featured in Musée départemental Arles antique, 2013

Arles Rhône 3 is an ancient Roman boat discovered in 2004, with parts of it only 13 feet (3.96 m) below the surface in the Rhône River of Arles, France. In the 1st century AD, it had been a 102 feet (31.09 m) long river trading vessel. It has been displayed since 2013 at the Musée départemental Arles antique. A marble Neptune was also discovered in the river, and divers recovered many amphorae. The boat's flat bottom was made of oak planks.

== See also ==
- List of surviving ancient ships
- Alkedo
- Marsala Ship
- Roman ship of Marausa
