= Museum of Ancient Ships, Pisa =

Museum of Ancient Ships
- Museo delle Navi Antiche
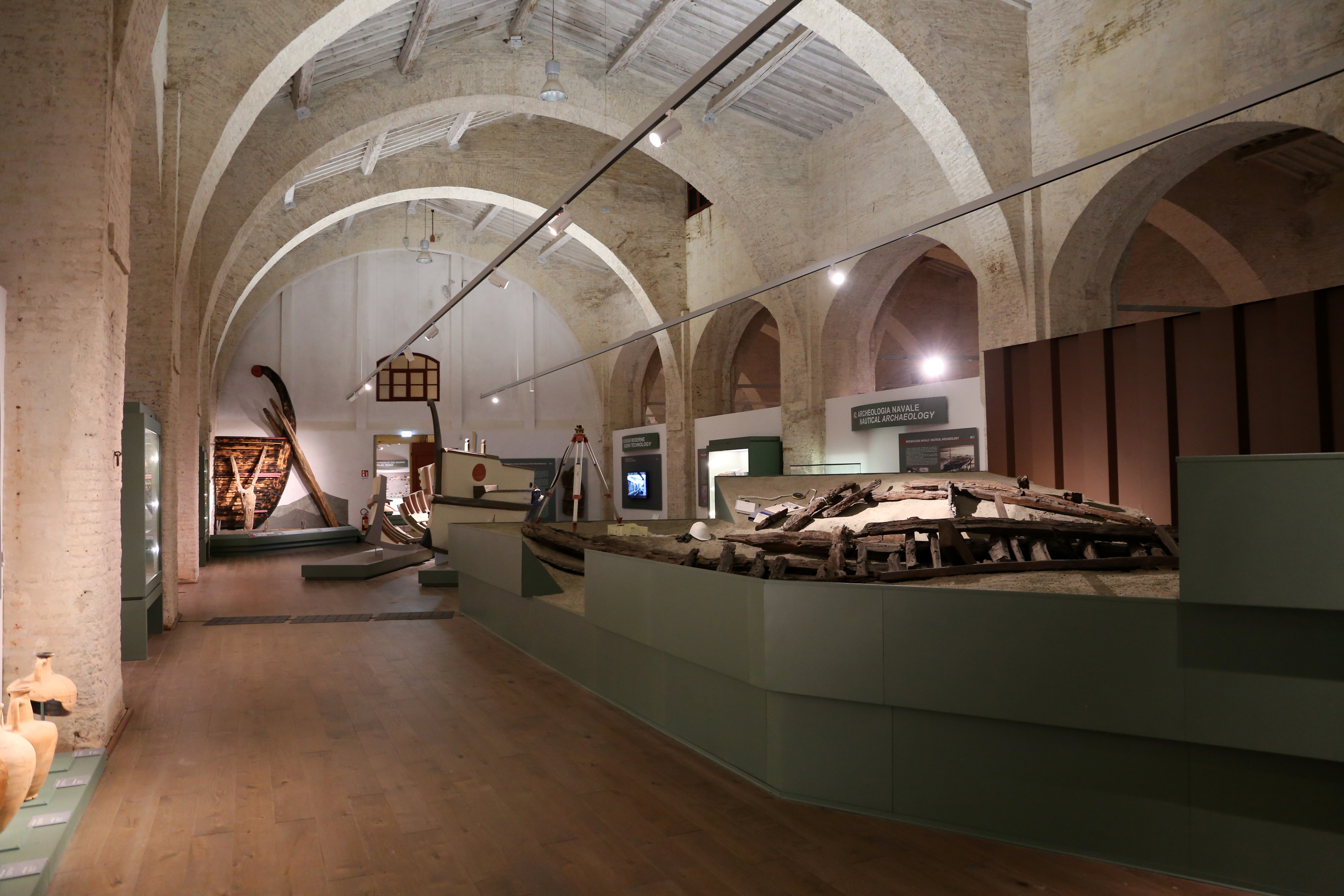
- Location: Pisa, Italy
- Coordinates: 43.7148°N 10.3923°E
- Type: museum

The Museum of Ancient Ships is a museum in Pisa, Tuscany, Italy. The museum exhibits ancient ships and artifacts. The exhibition space is within the ancient halls of the Medici Arsenals.

== Some museum items ==
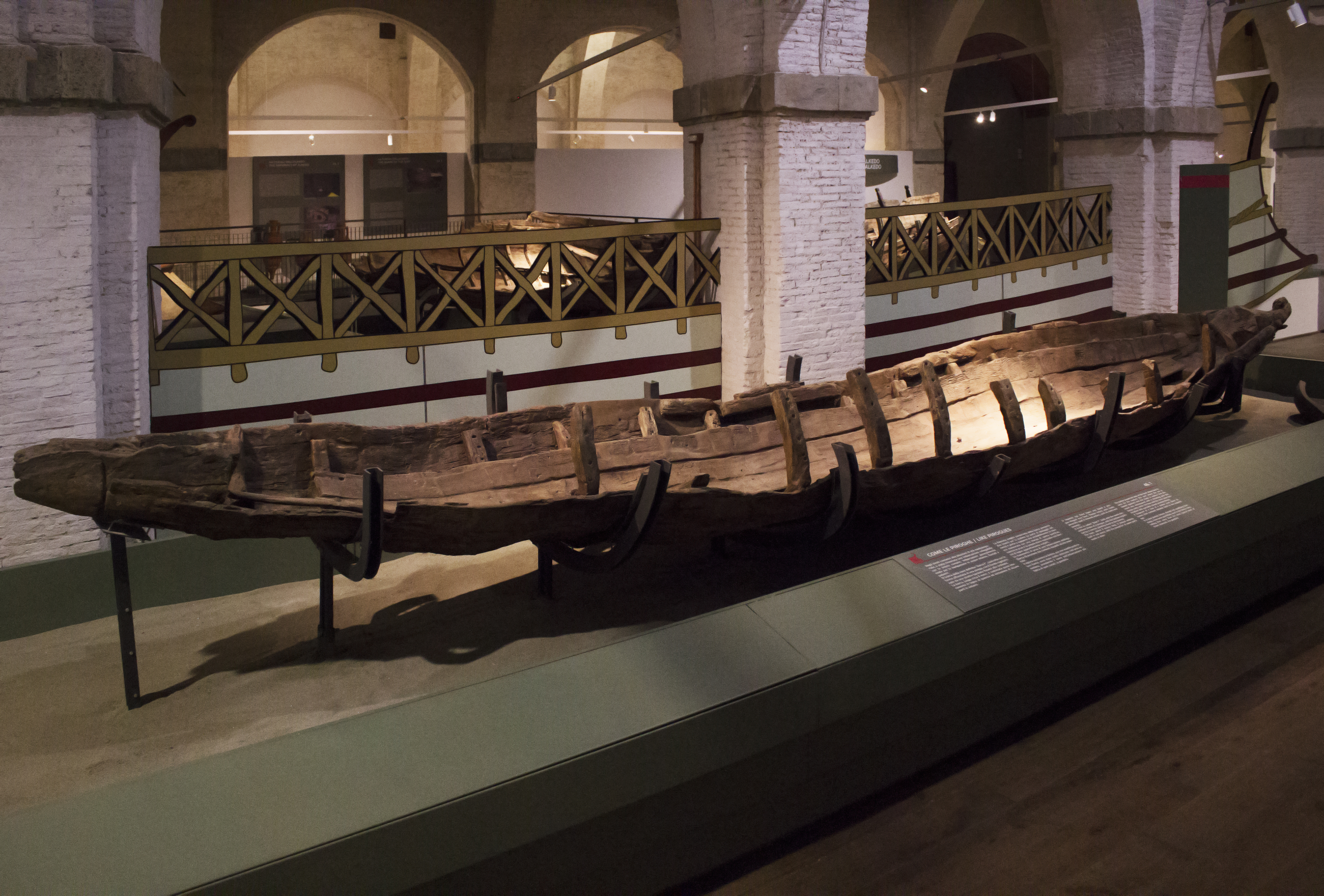
An ancient boat

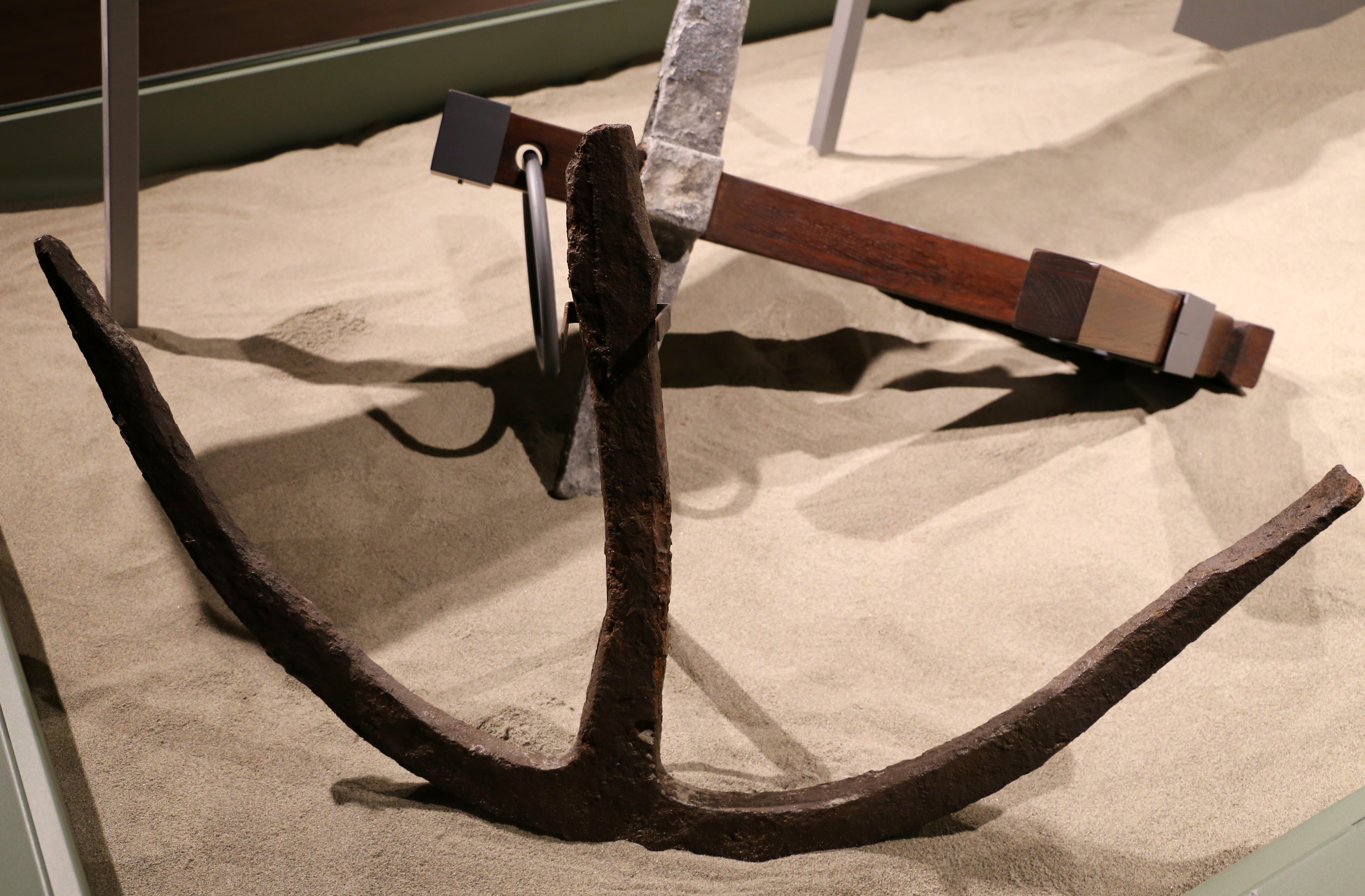
An ancient anchor

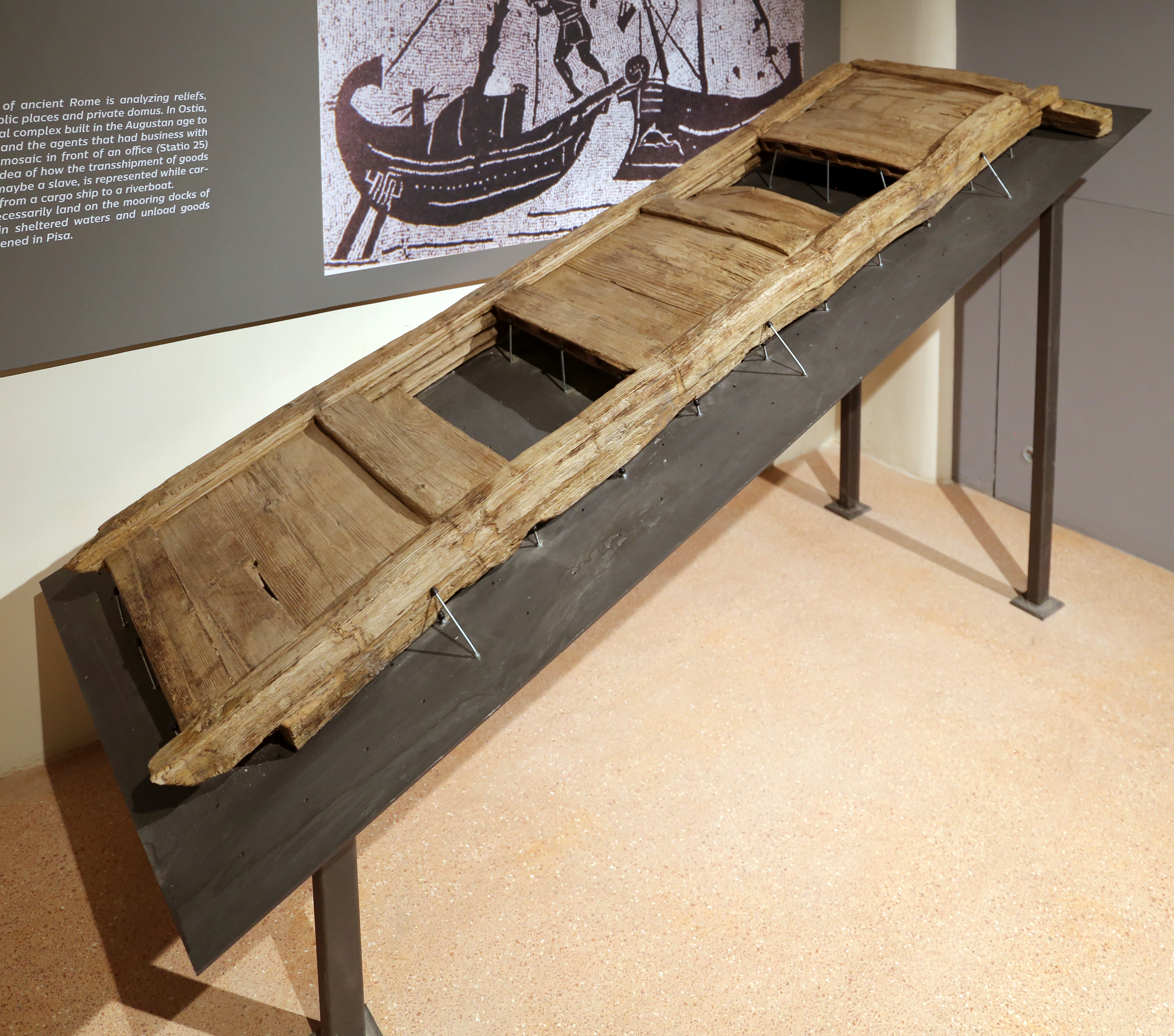
An ancient walkway

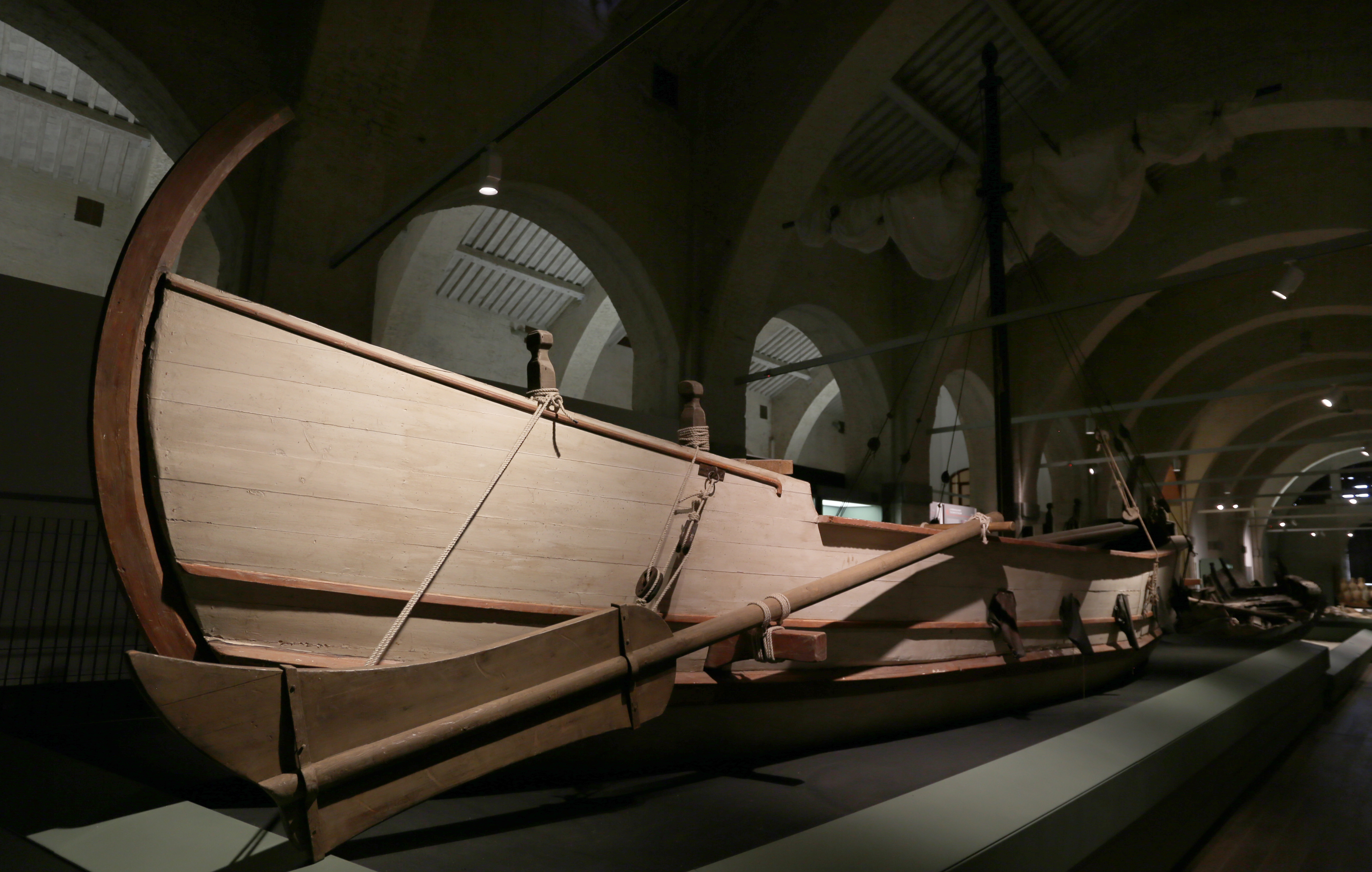
Replica of the shipwreck Alkedo

== See also ==
- Ancient shipbuilding techniques
