= Falling Autumn Leaves =

Pair of paintings by Vincent van Gogh

Falling Autumn Leaves (F486)
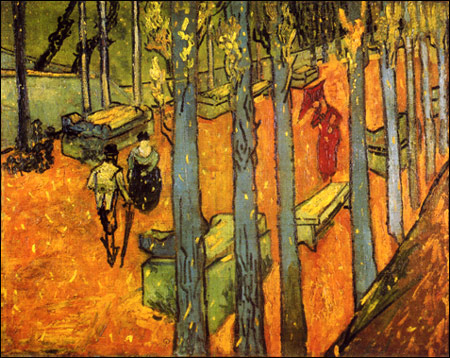
- Artist: Vincent van Gogh
- Year: 1888
- Catalogue: F486; JH1620
- Medium: Oil on canvas
- Dimensions: 73 cm × 92 cm (29 in × 36 in)
- Location: Kröller-Müller Museum; Otterlo

Falling Autumn Leaves (F487)
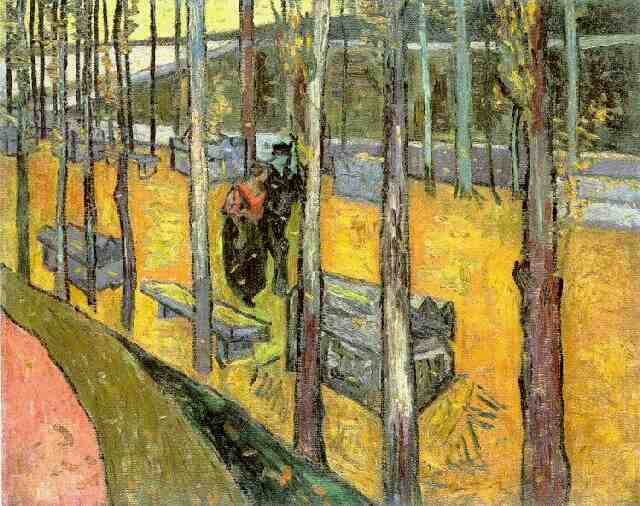
- Artist: Vincent van Gogh
- Year: 1888
- Catalogue: F487; JH1621
- Medium: Oil on canvas
- Dimensions: 72 cm × 91 cm (28 in × 36 in)
- Location: Private collection

Fall of Leaves (original French title: Chûte de feuilles), or Falling Autumn Leaves is a pair of paintings (in French pendants, i. e. counterparts) by the Dutch painter Vincent van Gogh. They were executed during the two months at the end of 1888 that his artist friend Paul Gauguin spent with him at The Yellow House in Arles, France.

== Les Alyscamps ==
Following months of correspondence, Paul Gauguin joined van Gogh in Arles in October 1888. Both were intent on depicting a "non-naturalist landscape". These two paintings, emphasizing the artist's Post-Impressionism emotional style, rather than being a pure representation of nature are among the first works that Van Gogh painted following Gauguin's arrival.

Van Gogh and Gauguin visited an ancient Roman necropolis, Les Alyscamps(the Elysian Fields), which had been built outside the city walls and stood a few hundred metres from the centre of Arles. Over time the grounds were overtaken by factories and the railroad. The city relocated some of the sarcophagi in a long alley lined with benches and poplar trees that led to a Romanesque chapel which became known as the Allée des Tombeaux. It quickly became a lover's lane celebrated throughout France. In total Van Gogh would complete four paintings of the Alyscamps between 20 February 1888 and 8 May 1889. Gauguin made two.

== The paintings ==
During a period of bad weather van Gogh worked on a second pair of "Les Alyscamps" paintings, which were taken from a vantage point above the lane and looking through the poplar trees, made in the studio. The yellow-orange of the leaves contrasts with the violet-blue trunks of the poplar trees. This painting, made shortly after Gauguin arrives in Arles, was unique in van Gogh's body of work and representative of the artistic achievements realised by two great artists working together. To Émile Bernard, van Gogh described the collaborative process as a pooling of thoughts and techniques where each artist creates their own unique work that is different, yet complements one another. Van Gogh believed that his pair of paintings Falling Autumn Leaves was just such a collaborative effort influenced by his own ideas as well as those of Gauguin and Bernard.

The paintings were made on Gauguin's jute which with Van Gogh's brushstroke made a finished tapestry-like texture. The high vantage point represented in the work resembled that of Gauguin's Vision After the Sermon. Creating a composition of a landscape viewed through the trunks of trees was something used previously by Bernard. Van Gogh used complementary, contrasting colors to intensify the effect of each color. The blue poplar trunks against the yellow path of leaves. Green is used against red. Violet was paired with an apricot. To his sister, Vincent wrote of the selection and placement of colors "which cause each other to shine brilliantly, which form a couple, which completes each other like man and woman."

Van Gogh's imagination created the figures in the paintings. In one, a couple of a thin man with an umbrella is paired with a large woman, much like van Gogh's image of a woman he might settle down with. On the lane is also a red-dressed woman. The other painting holds a couple who walk along the lane between stone sarcophagi, a yellow sunset at their backs.

== Van Gogh's other Les Alyscamps paintings ==
Van Gogh made another pair of paintings at Les Alyscamps.

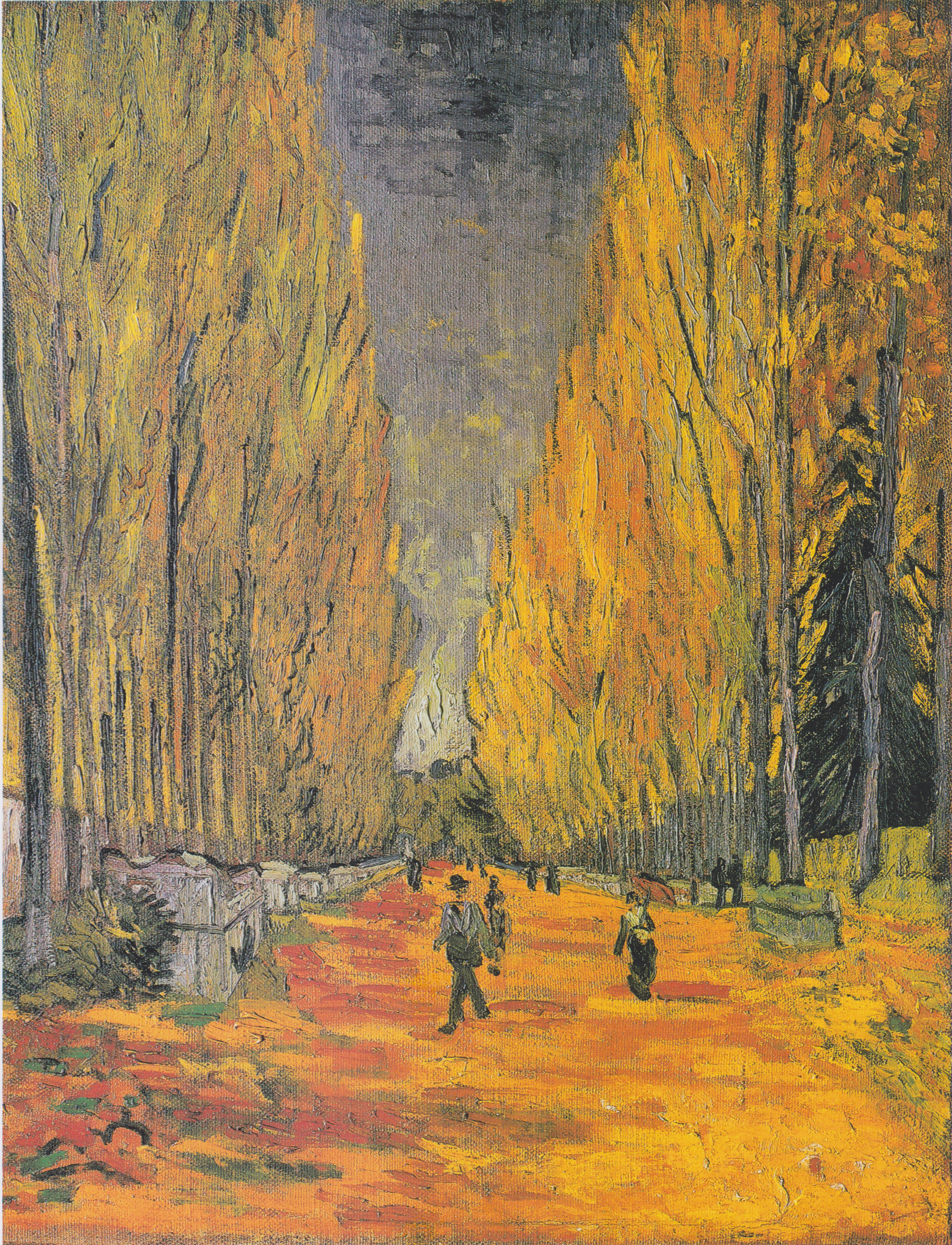
Les Alyscamps
1888
Private collection (F569)

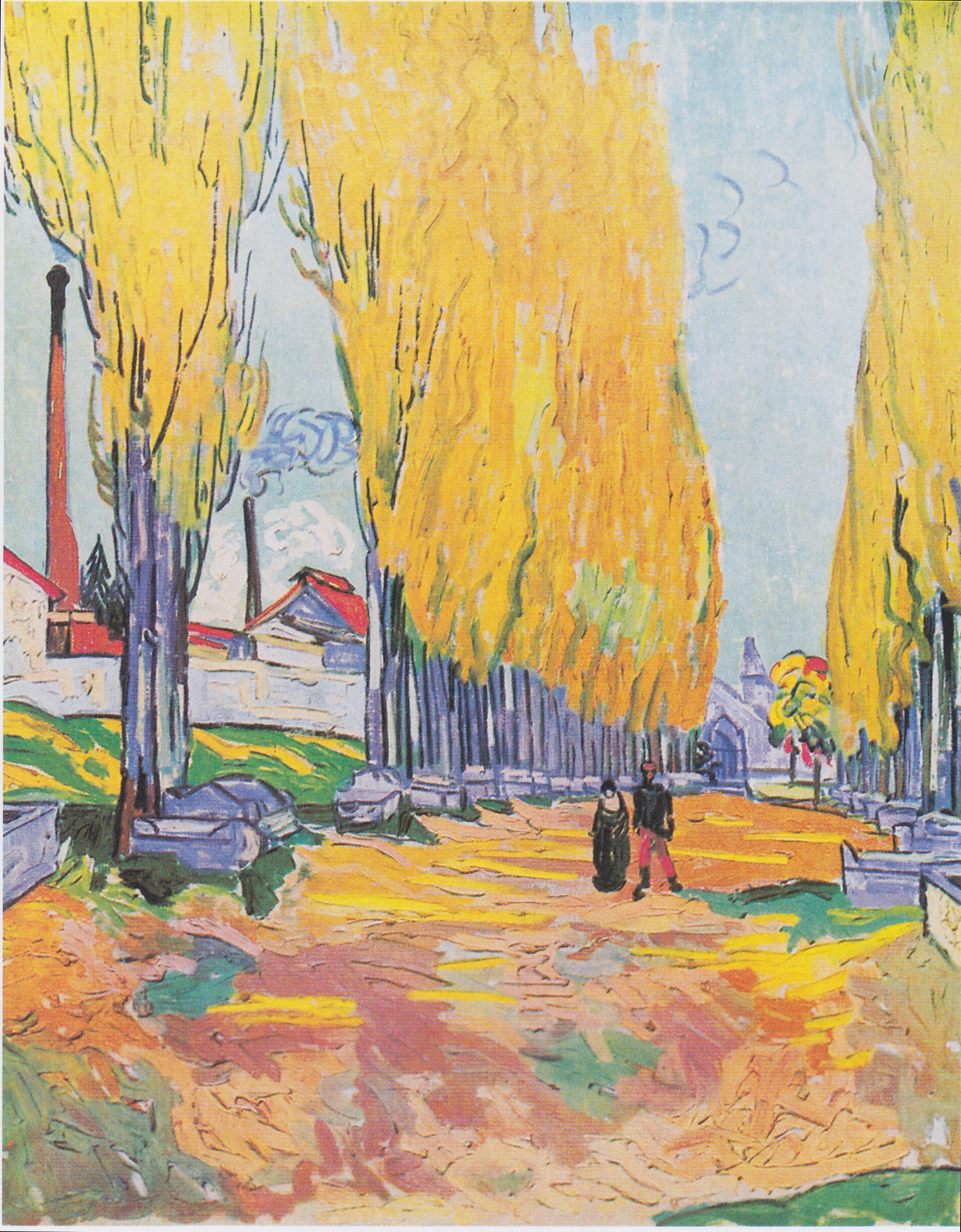
Les Alyscamps
1888
Collection Basil P. and Elise Goulandris, Laussane, Switzerland

== Gauguin's paintings ==
For his painting of Les Alyscamps, painted on the same day as van Gogh's, Gauguin chose a different vantage point, and excluded any reference to ancient sarcophagi.

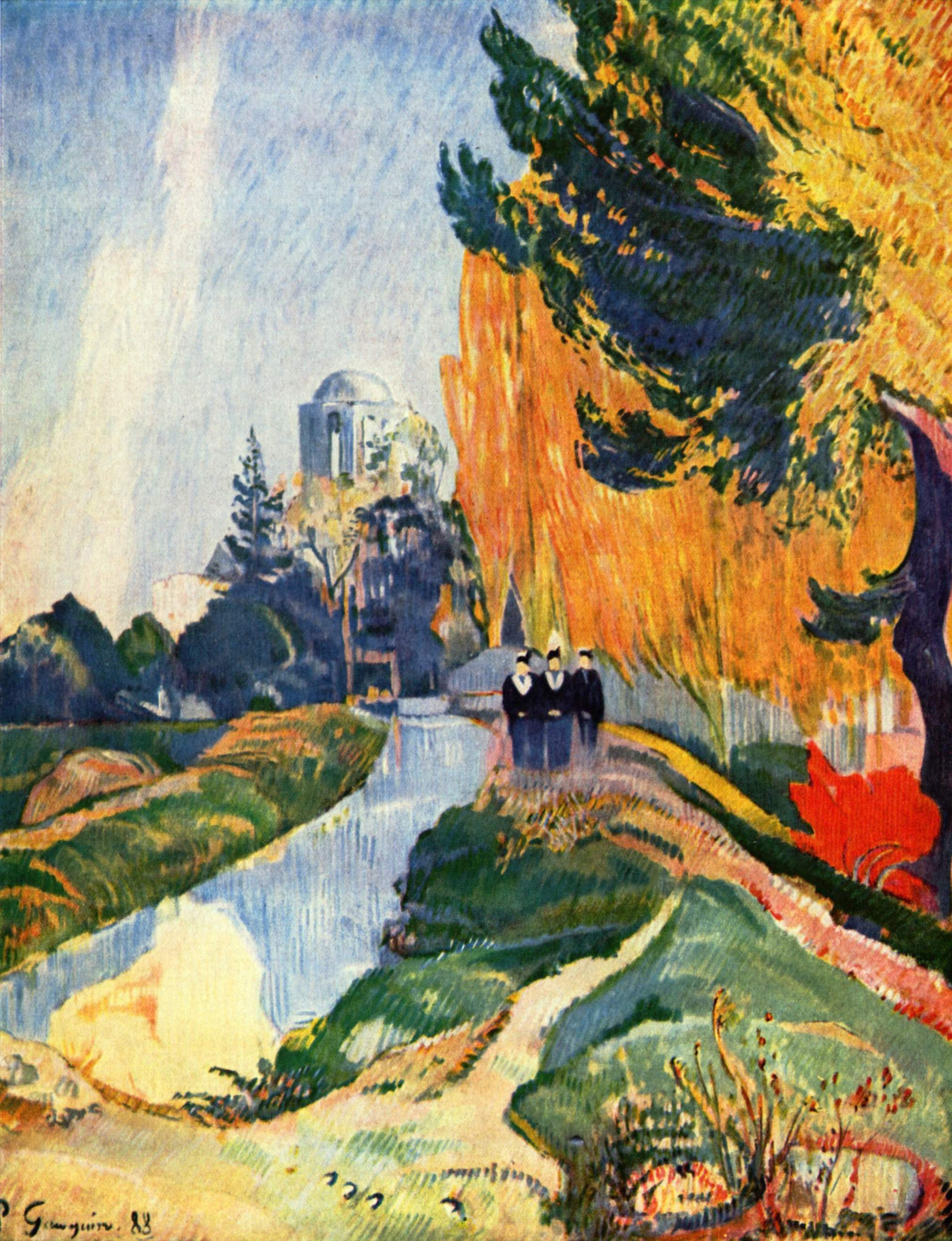
Paul Gauguin, Les Alyscamps
1888
Musée d'Orsay, Paris

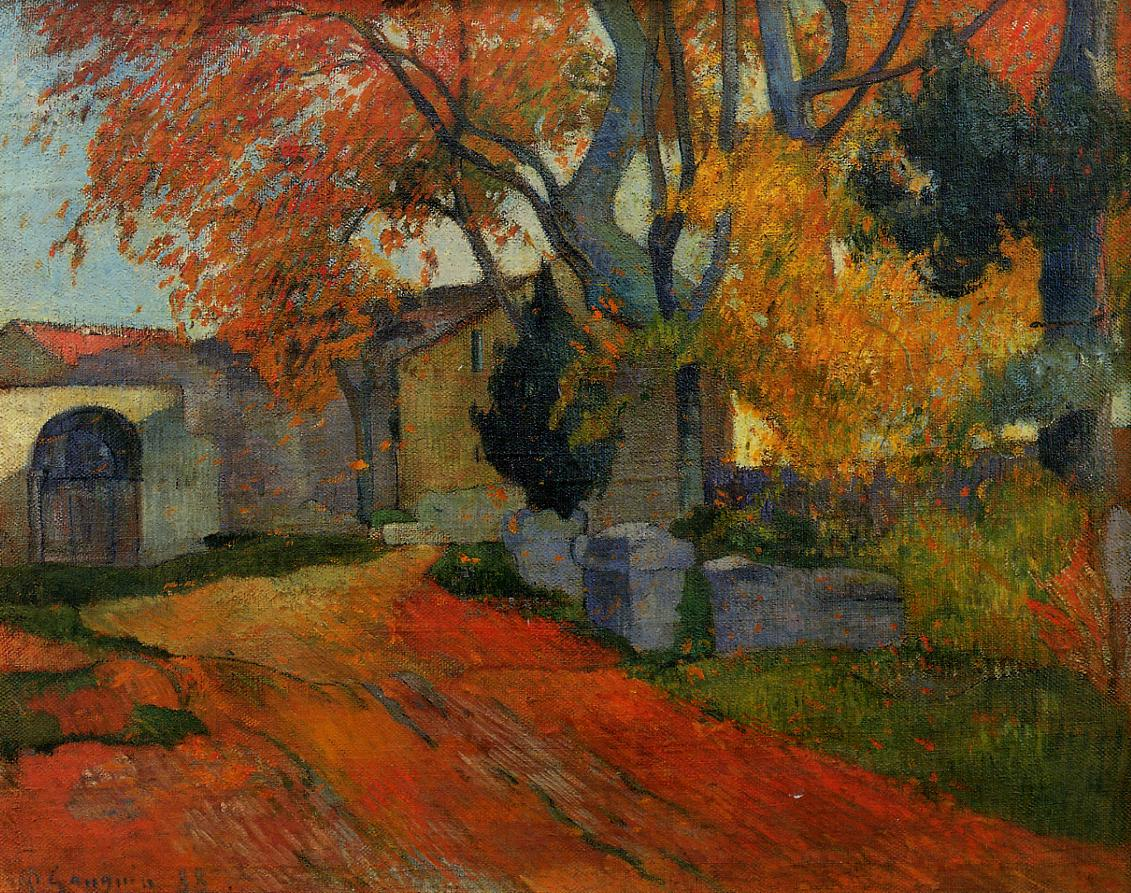
Paul Gauguin, Allée des Alyscamps
1888
Seiji Togo Memorial Sompo Japan Museum of Art, Tokyo

== See also ==
- List of works by Vincent van Gogh

== Bibliography ==
- Gayford, M (2006). The Yellow House: Van Gogh, Gauguin, and Nine Turbulent Weeks in Arles. Penguin. ISBN 0-670-91497-5.
- Naifeh, Steven; Smith, Gregory White. Van Gogh: The Life. Profile Books, 2011. ISBN 978-1846680106
