= Musée de l'Arles antique =

Museum in Arles, France

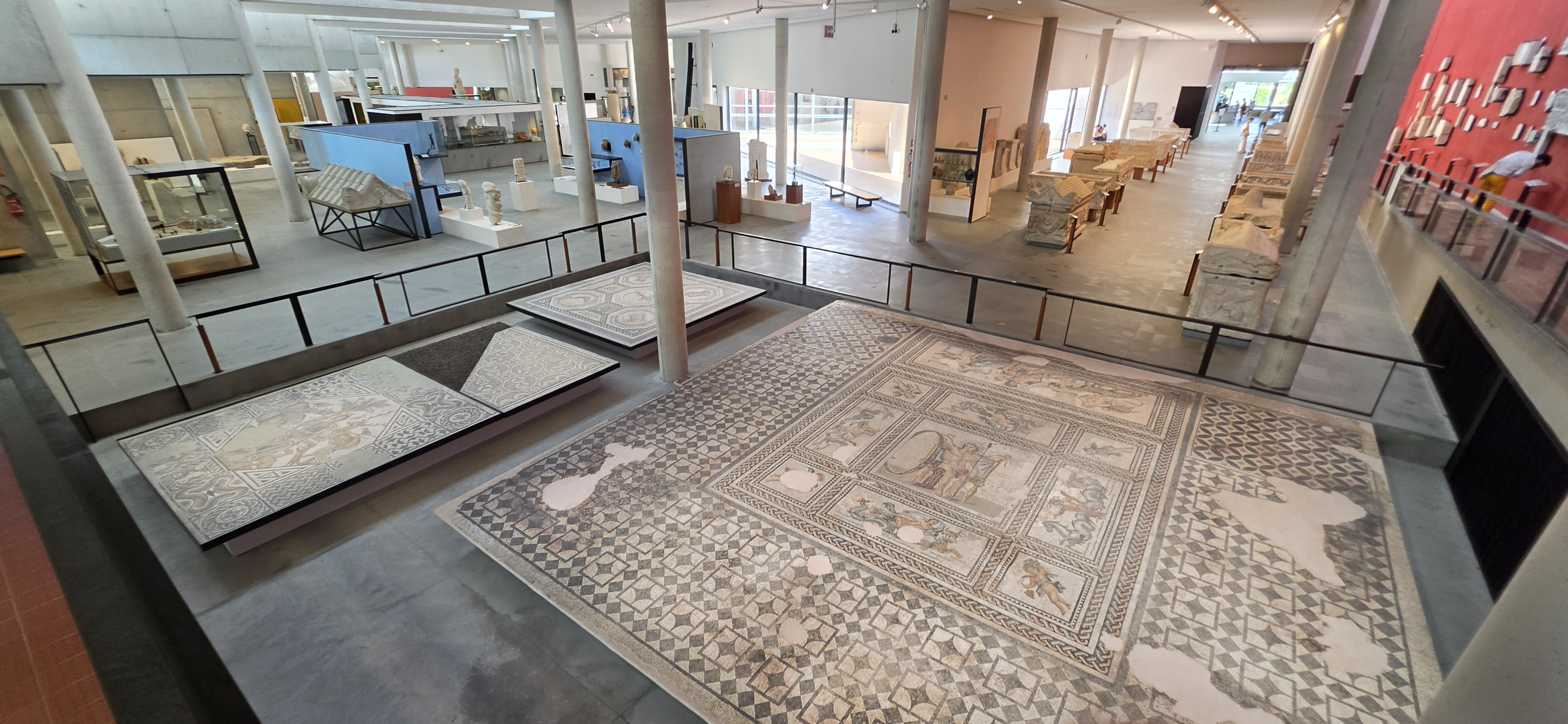
- A view of the museum.
- Established: 1995
- Location: Arles, France
- Coordinates: 43.6768016°N 4.6274194°E
- Type: Archaeology
- Website: www.arlesantique.fr

The Musée de l'Arles antique or Musée départemental Arles antique or Musée de l'Arles et de la Provence antiques is an archeological museum housed in a modern building designed and built in 1995 by the architect Henri Ciriani, at Arles in the Bouches-du-Rhône département of France.

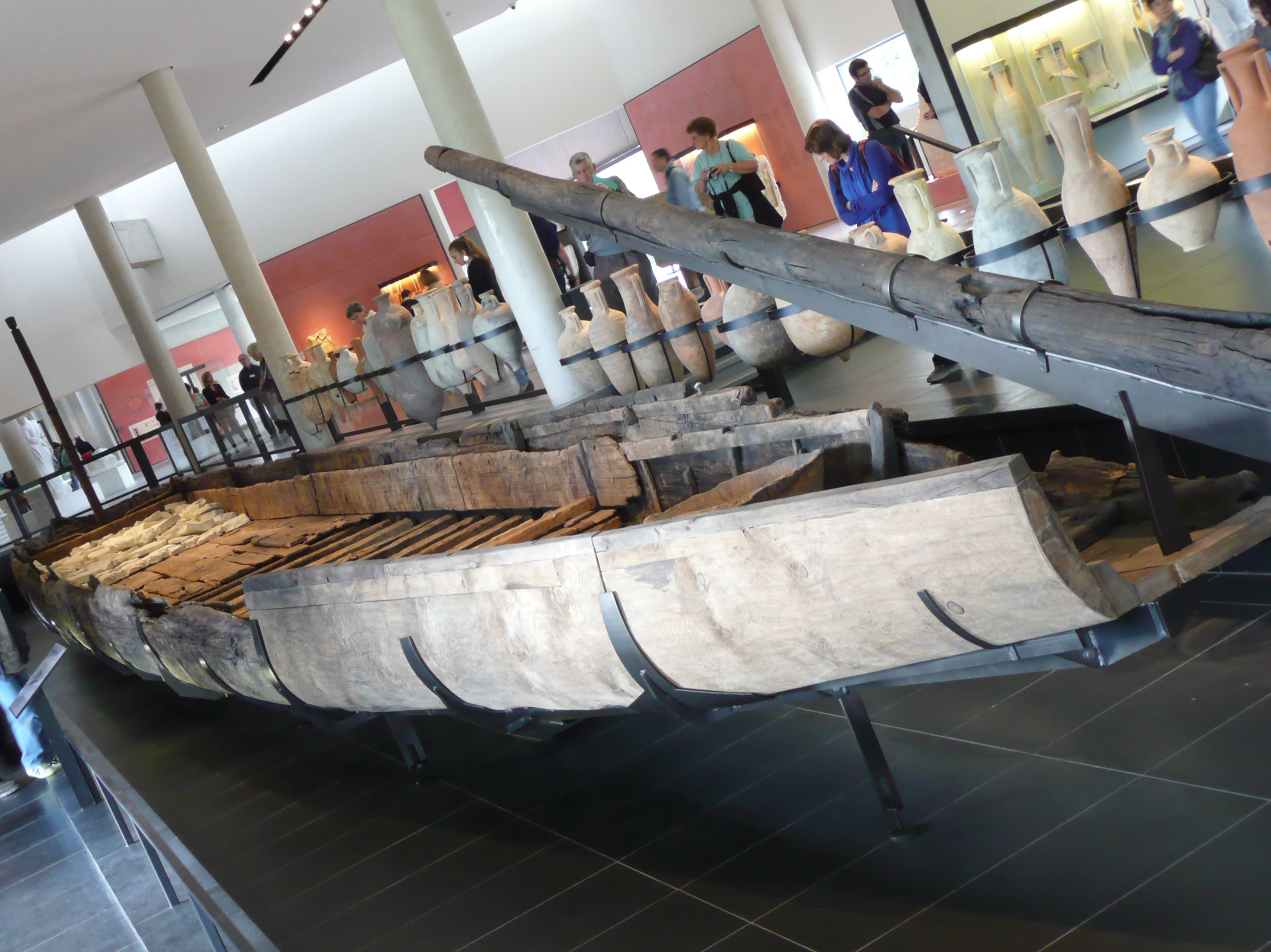
Arles Rhône 3 in the museum.

== Exhibits ==
The museum houses a large collection of antiquities, including monumental Roman sculptures from the local region. Among the exhibits is a model of the multiple overshot water mills, which existed at Barbegal, and have been referred to as "the greatest known concentration of mechanical power in the ancient world".

The Arles Rhône 3, an ancient Roman boat discovered in 2011, is on display since 2013.

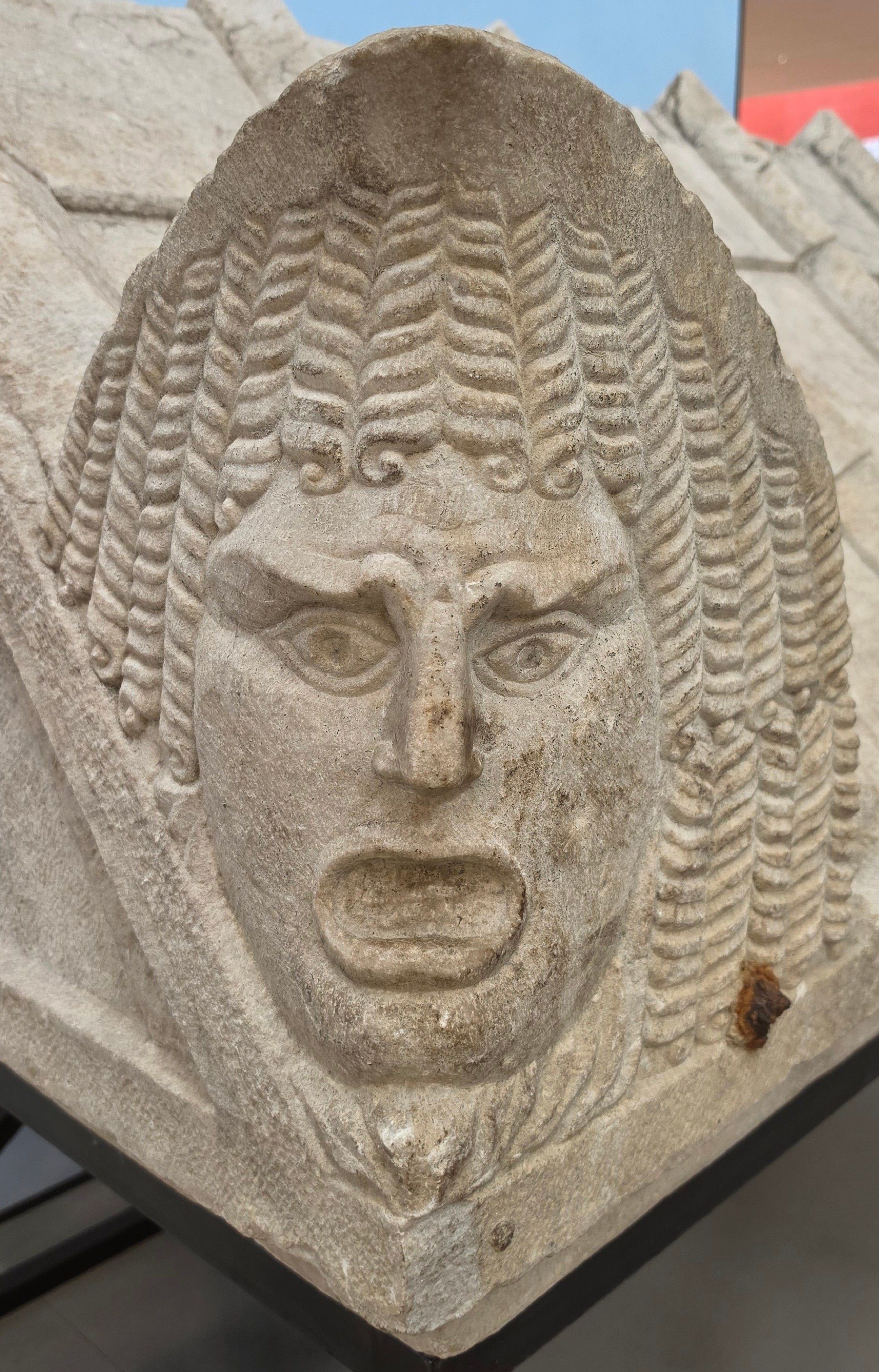
Marble sarcophagus from the beginning of the third century.

== See also ==
- Arles bust
- Head of Arles
- Musée Réattu
- Museon Arlaten
- List of museums in France
