= Alfred Russel Wallace centenary =

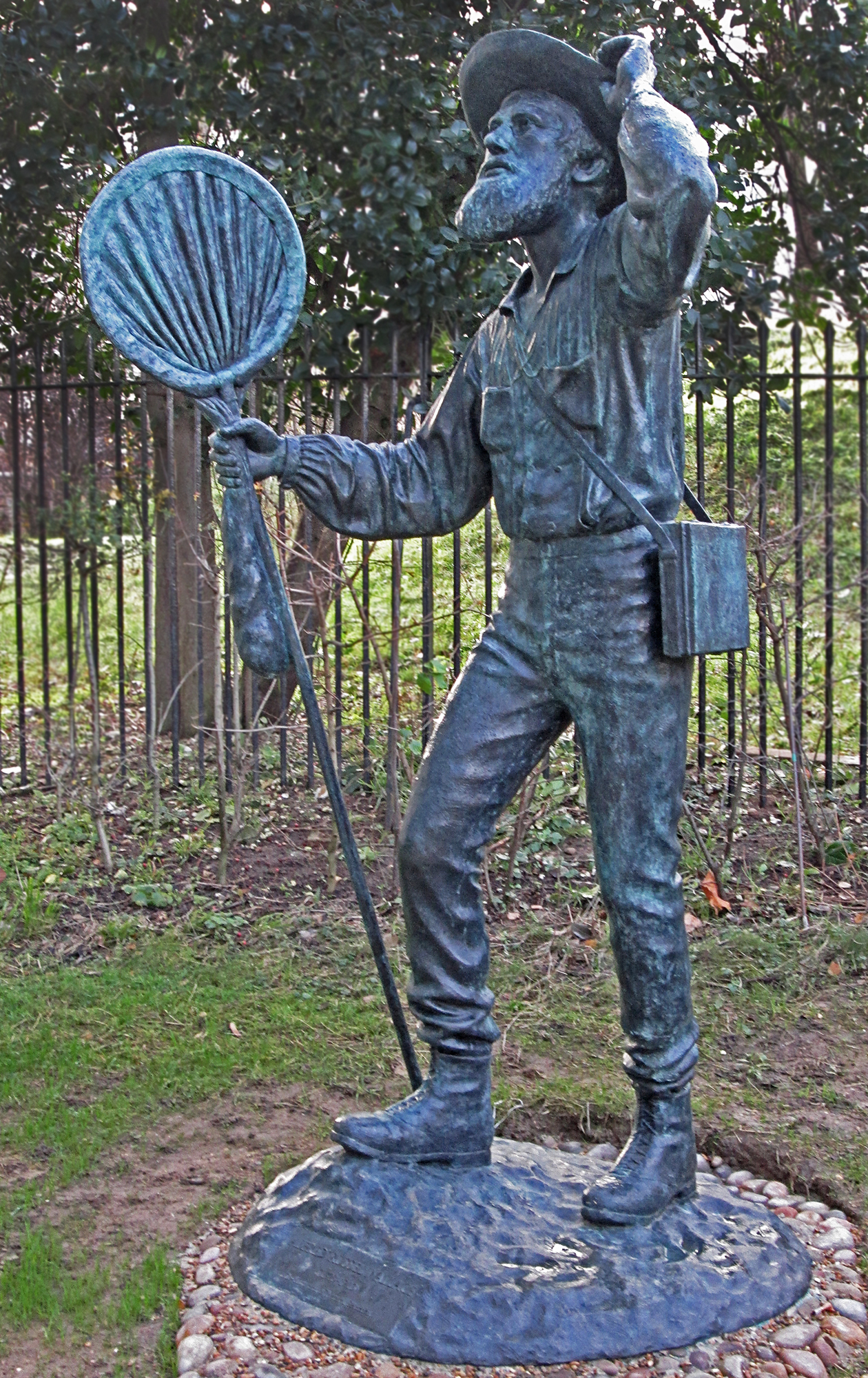
Statue in bronze of naturalist Alfred Russel Wallace (1823-1913) by Anthony Smith. He is looking up at a bronze model of a Wallace's golden birdwing butterfly (Ornithoptera croesus). The statue was commissioned by the Wallace Memorial Fund and was given to the Natural History Museum, London, where it was unveiled by Sir David Attenborough on November 7th 2013 - the 100th anniversary of Wallace's death.

The centenary of the death of the naturalist Alfred Russel Wallace on 7 November 1913 was marked in 2013 with events around the world to celebrate his life and work. The commemorations was co-ordinated by the Natural History Museum, London.

Events between October 2013 and June 2014 were planned by the Natural History Museum and other organisations including the Zoological Society of London, Cardiff University, the University of Alberta, Dorset County Museum, Swansea Museum, Dorset Wildlife Trust, Ness Botanical Gardens (South Wirral), the Royal Society, the Linnean Society, the Harvard Museum of Natural History, the American Museum of Natural History, Hertford Museum and the National Museum of Wales.

== Context ==
The naturalist, explorer, geographer, anthropologist and biologist Alfred Russel Wallace (born 8 January 1823) died on 7 November 1913. He is principally remembered now for having independently conceived the theory of evolution through natural selection, which prompted Charles Darwin to publish On the Origin of Species. Some of his books such as The Malay Archipelago remain in print; it is considered one of the best accounts of scientific exploration published during the 19th century. Wallace is also remembered for recognizing the presence of a biogeographical boundary, now known as the Wallace Line, that divides the Indonesian archipelago into two distinct parts: a western portion in which the animals are almost entirely of Asian origin, and an eastern portion where the fauna reflect the influence of Australasia.

== Events ==
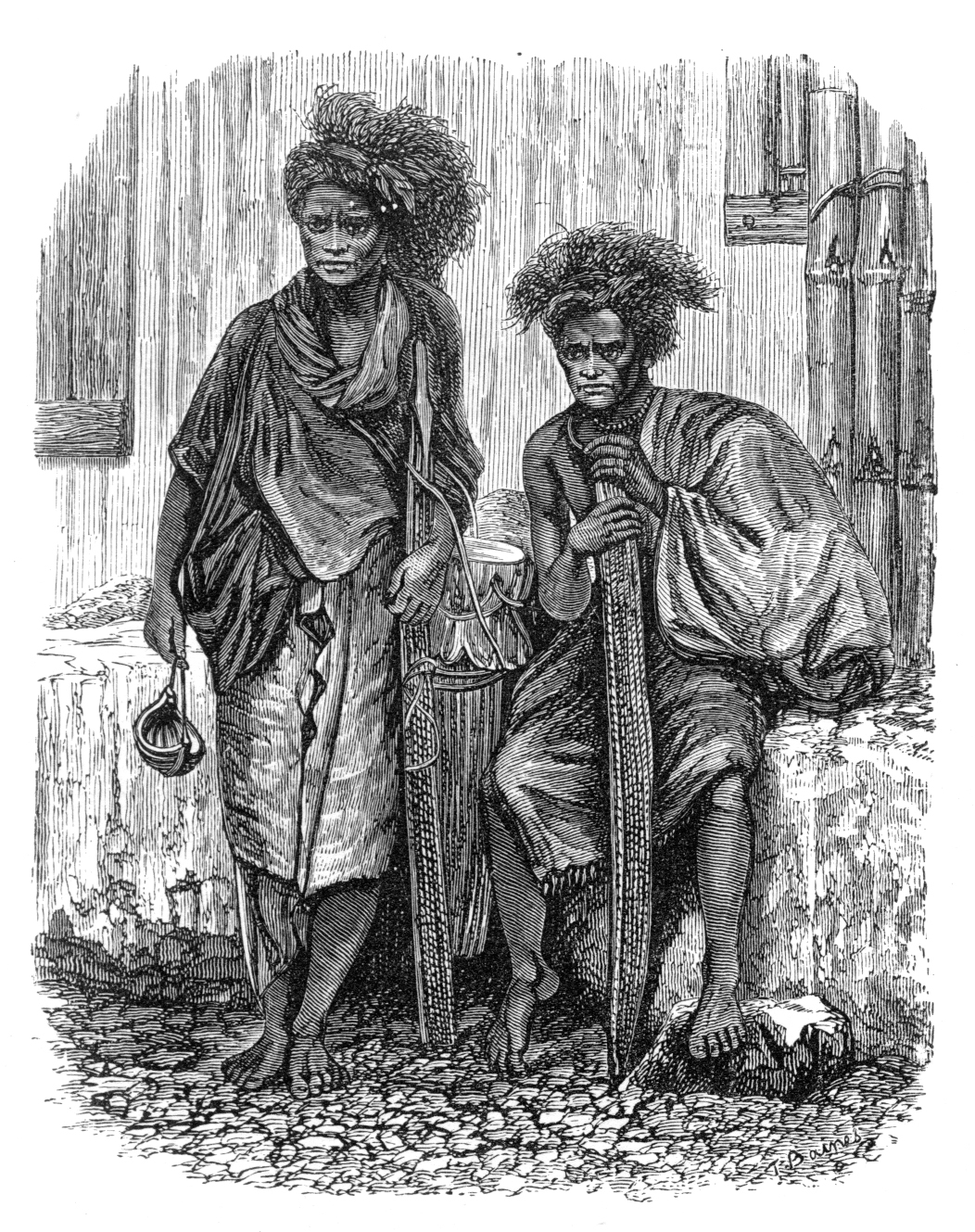
An illustration from Wallace's The Malay Archipelago, signed 'T. Baines', showing men from Timor holding palm leaf umbrellas, plant artefacts like one he gave to the Royal Botanic Gardens, Kew

The South Kensington Natural History Museum, London, co-ordinating commemorative events for the Wallace centenary worldwide in the 'Wallace100' project, created a website to celebrate Wallace's centenary. The museum holds the Wallace Collection of memorabilia including letters, Wallace's notebooks and other documents, and 28 drawers of insects and other specimens that he collected on his expeditions to the Malay Archipelago and to South America. The museum describes Wallace as "Father of biogeography", as a committed socialist, and as a spiritualist.

The Royal Society planned a two-day discussion meeting in October 2013 for researchers on "Alfred Russel Wallace and his legacy", with speakers including George Beccaloni, Steve Jones, Lynne Parenti, Tim Caro and Martin Rees. Cardiff University's School of Earth & Ocean Sciences had a lecture series in 2013-2014 as part of the centenary commemoration of Wallace.

Hertford Museum held several events including an evening of illustrated talks on 15 January 2014 at Hertford Theatre. Errol Fuller discussed Wallace and the curious 19th-century social phenomenon that guided his life; Sandra Knapp talked about Wallace's life and explorations in the Amazon.

The Linnean Society held a two-day celebration of Wallace's centenary in Bournemouth on 7 and 8 June 2013, together with the Society for the History of Natural History, Bournemouth University and Bournemouth Natural Science Society. The event included talks about Wallace, his thoughts on natural selection, his evolutionary insights, and his notebooks and letters. A theatrical performance, You Should Ask Wallace, was put on by Theatre na n'Og. On the second day the group visited Wallace's grave and went on a nature walk in Wallace's memory.

The Royal Botanic Gardens, Kew ran a display of Wallace memorabilia including letters, photographs, artefacts made from plants, and herbarium specimens in 2013. Kew magazine likewise published an article "The Wallace Connection" to mark the centenary.

The American Museum of Natural History, New York City, planned a talk by naturalist and broadcaster David Attenborough for 12 November 2013, entitled 'Alfred Russel Wallace and the Birds of Paradise'. Birute Galdikas, one of Louis Leakey's 'ape women', spoke about her orangutans at the museum's Wallace conference.

In 2013 the BBC broadcast a two-part television series, Bill Bailey's Jungle Hero: Alfred Russel Wallace, in which the musician and comedian Bill Bailey travelled in the footsteps of Wallace in Indonesia to show what the naturalist achieved.
