= John Jenner Weir =

English naturalist (1822 - 1894)

John Jenner Weir

John Jenner Weir, FLS, FZS (9 August 1822 – 23 March 1894) was an English amateur entomologist, ornithologist and British civil servant. He is best known today for being one of the naturalists who corresponded with and provided important data to both Charles Darwin and Alfred Russel Wallace.

He played an important role in the formulation of Wallace's theory of aposematism, providing the first experimental evidence for the effectiveness, and hence the existence, of warning coloration in caterpillars.

== Life and civil service career ==
Weir was born on 9 August 1822. at Lewes in East Sussex. He joined the customs service in 1839, rising to the high position of Accountant and Controller-General of Customs in London in 1874. He would hold that post until his retirement in 1885.

== Work as a naturalist ==
Weir was an amateur naturalist who pursued interests in entomology, the study of insects, ornithology, the study of birds, and botany, the study of plants. His initial interest was in Lepidoptera (butterflies and moths) and the first paper he ever published, in 1845, was on the discovery of the scarce forester moth, Jordanita (Adscita) globulariae, in Lewes. He was noted for his work collecting and setting very small Lepidoptera until an accident in 1870 resulted in the loss of the top half of his left thumb, which prevented him from setting very small insects. He kept birds in an aviary in his garden where he conducted experiments on predation of insects by birds.

Weir was a well-known figure and popular among his fellow British entomologists. For four years he was treasurer of the Entomological Society of London and two times its vice president. Shortly before his death he was elected president of the South London Entomological and Natural History Society. He was a fellow of both the Linnean Society and the Zoological Society.

=== Correspondence with Darwin ===
Weir was a frequent correspondent of Charles Darwin. Darwin cited a number of his observations in The Descent of Man, and Selection in Relation to Sex, as well as in The Variation of Animals and Plants Under Domestication, and The Expression of the Emotions in Man and Animals.

=== Warning coloration ===
In the 1867 letter to Charles Darwin in which he proposed his hypothesis of warning coloration in animals, Alfred Russel Wallace credited Weir with providing him with the key observation that birds in his aviary would not capture and eat a certain kind of common white moth. After Wallace asked the Entomological Society of London for data to test his hypothesis, Weir conducted two years of experiments on the predation of birds upon caterpillars with a variety of different color schemes, providing the first hard data in support of the theory.

Years later Wallace would give the following account of the experiments:

Mr. Jenner Weir was the first to experiment with ten species of small birds in his aviary, and he found that none of them would eat the following smooth-skinned conspicuous caterpillars—Abraxas grossulariata, Diloba caeruleocephala, Anthrocera filipendula, and Cucullia verbasci. He also found that they would not touch any hairy or spiny larvae, and he was satisfied that it was not the hairs or the spines, but the unpleasant taste that caused them to be rejected, because in one case a young smooth larva of a hairy species, and in another case the pupa of a spiny larva, were equally rejected. On the other hand, all green or brown caterpillars as well as those that resemble twigs were greedily devoured.

== Death ==
He died from heart failure on 23 March 1894, just a couple of weeks after participating in his last meeting of the South London Entomological and Natural History Society where he submitted his final paper for publication. He had been suffering from angina pectoris for a few years.
