= The World of Life =

1910 book by Alfred Russel Wallace

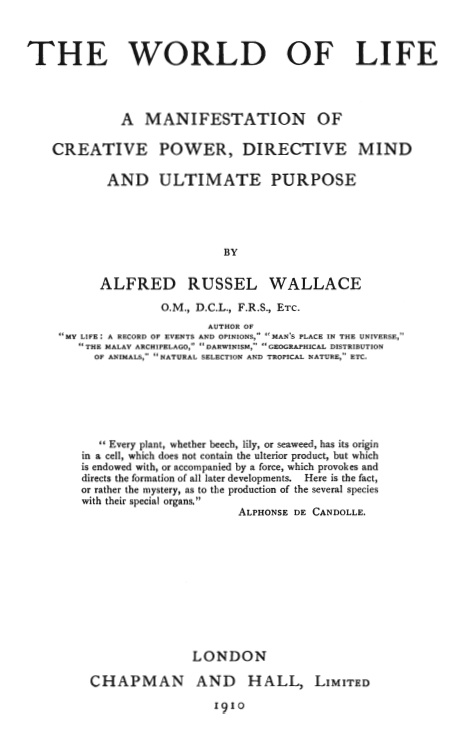
- Author: Alfred Russel Wallace
- Language: English
- Subject: Evolutionary biology
- Publisher: Chapman and Hall
- Publication date: 1910
- Publication place: United Kingdom

The World of Life: A Manifestation of Creative Power, Directive Mind and Ultimate Purpose is a book by English naturalist Alfred Russel Wallace, first published in 1910, which summarizes his views of evolutionary theory, evolution of species (plant, animal, human), and teleology or purpose in nature. Prior to this publication Wallace had written an article in 1909 entitled The World of Life. Alfred Russel Wallace was the co-discoverer of natural selection with Charles Darwin. This work was published in the latter part of Wallace's life and it would be one of his final contributions to evolution. In the book he suggested that the universe might have a purpose, and that certain aspects of living organisms might not be explainable in terms of purely materialistic processes.

Wallace was considered the 19th century's leading expert on the geographical distribution of animal species, and is sometimes called the "father of biogeography", or more specifically of zoogeography. Throughout his scientific career, he wrote on numerous other subjects such as natural history, anthropology, origins of life, astrobiology. Prior to 1864, Wallace believed that humans were a result of only natural selection, however, by 1869 Wallace had changed his view since he felt that natural selection was an insufficient mechanism for the development of multiple features in man (e.g high capacity for rationality) and, according to historians of science, postulated that "higher intelligences guiding man's development were required."

== Scope of the work ==
In an interview prior to publication, Wallace explained the scope of the book:

Ah, we come to a great question. I deal with it in a book which Chapman and Hall are to publish this winter. In some ways this book will be my final contribution to the philosophic side of evolution. It concerns itself with the great question of Purpose. Is there guidance and control, or is everything the result of chance? Are we solitary in the cosmos, and without meaning to the rest of the universe; or are we one in “a stair of creatures,” a hierarchy of beings? Now, you may approach this matter along the metaphysical path, or, as a man of exact science, by observation of the physical globe and reflection upon visible and tangible objects. My contribution is made as a man of science, as a naturalist, as a man who studies his surroundings to see where he is. And the conclusion I reach in my book is this: That everywhere, not here and there, but everywhere, and in the very smallest operations of nature to which human observation has penetrated, there is Purpose and a continual Guidance and Control.

== Contents ==
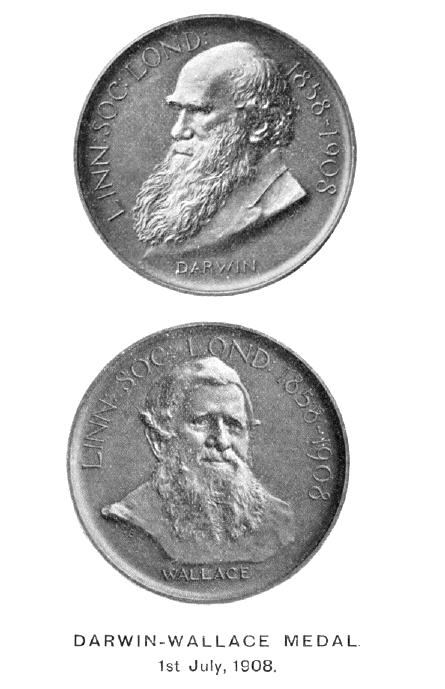
The Darwin–Wallace Medal was issued by the Linnean Society on the 50th anniversary of the reading of Darwin and Wallace's papers on natural selection.

Wallace discusses what life is, the variety and distribution of species, tropical distribution of plants, the relation of distribution of species and evolution along with multiple cases for natural selection.

He also discusses the effects of temperature from the surface of the earth on speciation along with adaption on animals, plants, and humans. Elaborates on the geological record and progressive speciation.

Part of the text considered the organizational aspects of adaption that imply a Mind or directive force is involved. Human beings are a special case. One of Wallace's strongest arguments concerns human intellectual and moral capacities. He believes that abilities such as abstract reasoning, mathematics, music, morality, and artistic appreciation appear to exceed what would have been required simply for survival among early humans. He therefore questions whether ordinary natural selection alone can explain the human mind.

In other sections he addresses objections and issues with Darwinian philosophy, along with discourse on the limitations of what it can achieve.

Part of his book extends to research on cellular machinery and the design of cells. States,

The remarkable thing in all these one-celled creatures is that they so much resemble higher animals without any of their organs. The writer of the article Cell in Chambers's Encyclopaedia says: "The absence of a circulating fluid, of digestive glands, nerves, sense-organs, lungs, kidneys, and the like, does not in any way restrict the vital functions of a unicellular organism. All goes on as usual, only with greater chemical complexity, since all the different processes have but a unit-mass of protoplasm in which they occur. The physiology of independent cells, instead of being very simple, must be very complex, just because structure or differentiation is all but absent."

— Ch. 17 The Mystery of the Cell

He also engages in discussion of the importance of water on organisms and the function of elements on life. Discusses the chemical composition of organisms as well.

Sections involving morality are also present along with inquiries into cruelty in nature and purpose.

He ends the work by discussing the inference to intelligences and minds as being creative forces for the emergence of life to a notable extent.

== Reception ==
The journal Nature published a review in 1910 on the work not being merely a summary of opinions on his life's work, but that it carried fresh insights. The Independent published a review of the work in 1911 indicating that most of the work defends the view of gradual process of evolution among species as he and Darwin have argued, but it adds that some living creatures exhibit more than mere chemical forces at work, implying that purpose and intelligence may also have been at work in the history of life.

According to Historian of science Michael Flannery, Wallace discusses a systematic natural theology of sorts such as natural law-like processes that are teleologically orchestrated which reflect life more accurately that William Paley's fixist constant interventions. Instead "Wallace referred repeatedly to “the whole vast complex of the organic machinery” of life requiring design, direction, and purpose".

== Bibliography ==
- Flannery, Michael A. (2011). Alfred Russel Wallace's Theory of Intelligent Evolution: With an abridged version of The World of Life. Erasmus Press. ISBN 9780981520445.
