= Alfred Russel Wallace =

English naturalist (1823–1913)

Alfred Russel Wallace OM FRS
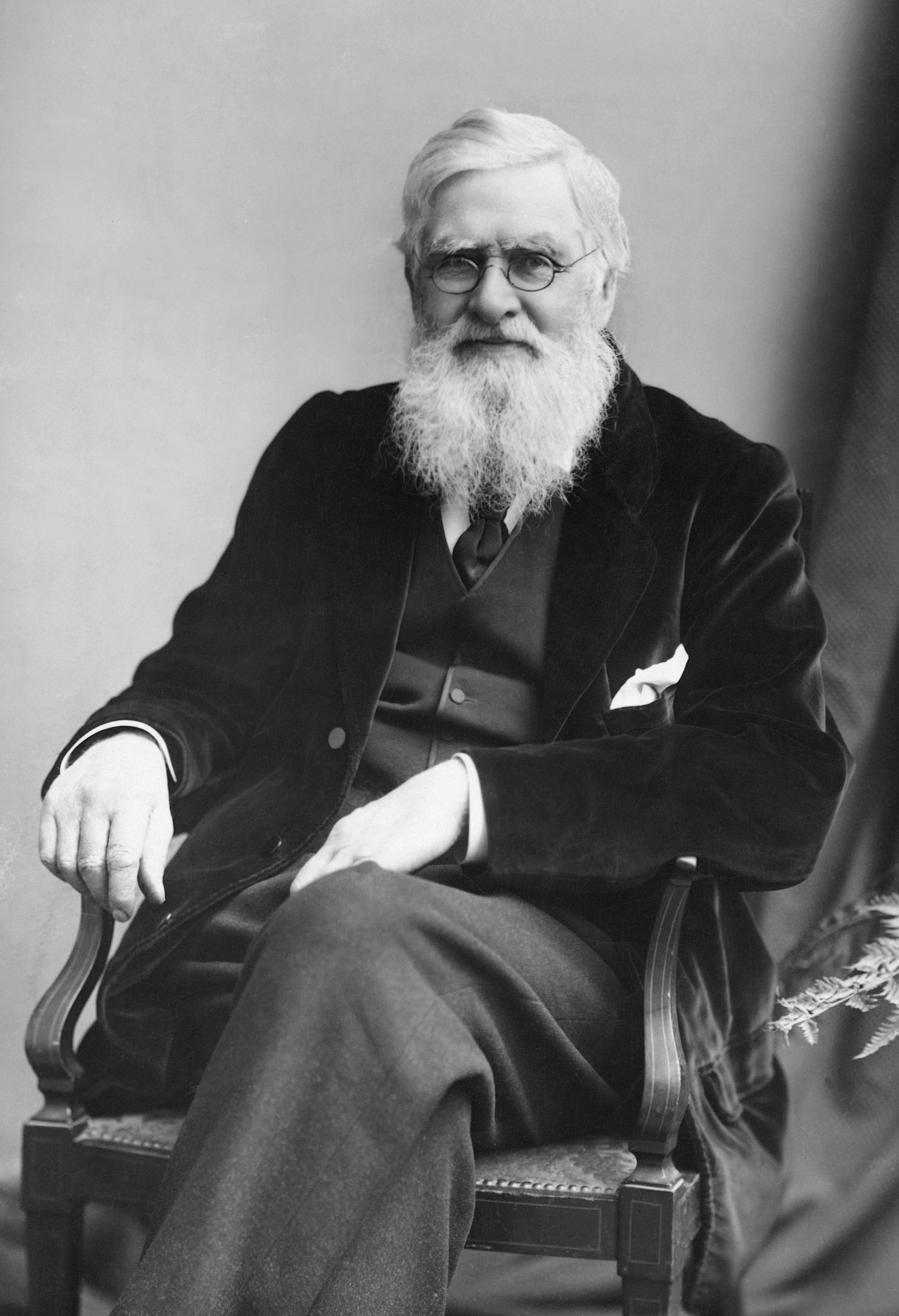
- Wallace in 1895
- Born: 8 January 1823; Llanbadoc, Monmouthshire (Note: Though today in Wales, Monmouthshire's status was ambiguous at the time and was even considered by some to be in England, which it borders.)
- Died: 7 November 1913 (aged 90); Broadstone, Dorset, England
- Known for: Co-discovery of natural selection; Pioneering work on biogeography; Wallace Line; Wallace effect
- Spouse: Annie Mitten (m. 1866)
- Children: 3
- Awards: Royal Medal (1868); Gold Medal of the Société de Géographie (1870); Darwin Medal (1890); Founder's Medal (1892); Linnean Medal (1892); Copley Medal (1908); Darwin–Wallace Medal (Gold, 1908); Order of Merit (1908)
- Scientific career
- Fields: Exploration; evolutionary biology; zoology; biogeography; social reform
- Author abbrev. (botany): Wallace

Alfred Russel Wallace (8 January 1823 – 7 November 1913) was an English naturalist, explorer, geographer, anthropologist and illustrator. He independently conceived the theory of evolution through natural selection; his 1858 paper on the subject was published that year alongside extracts from Charles Darwin's writings on the topic. It spurred Darwin to set aside the "big species book" he was drafting and to quickly write an abstract of it, which was published in 1859 as On the Origin of Species.

Wallace did extensive fieldwork, starting in the Amazon River basin. He then did fieldwork in the Malay Archipelago, where he identified the faunal divide now termed the Wallace Line, which separates the Indonesian archipelago into two distinct parts: a western portion in which the animals are largely of Asian origin, and an eastern portion where the fauna reflect Australasia. He was considered the 19th century's leading expert on the geographical distribution of animal species, and is sometimes called the "father of biogeography", or more specifically of zoogeography.

Wallace was one of the leading evolutionary thinkers of the 19th century, working on warning coloration in animals and reinforcement (sometimes known as the Wallace effect), a way that natural selection could contribute to speciation by encouraging the development of barriers against hybridisation. In 1864 he was the first to propose that during the later stages of human evolution natural selection would have primarily acted on mental faculties rather than on the physical form. Wallace's 1904 book Man's Place in the Universe was the first serious attempt by a biologist to evaluate the likelihood of life on other planets. He also had a scientific interest in the possibility of life on Mars.

Aside from scientific work, he was a social activist, critical of what he considered to be the unjust social and economic systems of 19th-century Britain and later in life became an active socialist. His advocacy of spiritualism and mind–body dualism strained his relationship with other scientists. He was one of the first prominent scientists to raise concerns over the environmental impact of human activity. He wrote prolifically on both scientific and social issues; his account of his adventures and observations during his explorations in Southeast Asia, The Malay Archipelago, was first published in 1869. It continues to be both popular and highly regarded.

== Biography ==
=== Early life ===
Alfred Russel Wallace was born on 8 January 1823 in Llanbadoc, Monmouthshire. He was the eighth of nine children born to Mary Anne Wallace (née Greenell) and Thomas Vere Wallace. His mother was English, while his father was of Scottish ancestry. His family claimed a connection to William Wallace, a leader of Scottish forces during the Wars of Scottish Independence in the 13th century.

Wallace's father graduated in law but never practised it. He owned some income-generating property, but bad investments and failed business ventures resulted in a steady deterioration of the family's financial position. Wallace's mother was from a middle-class family of Hertford, whereto his family moved when Wallace was five years old. He attended Hertford Grammar School until 1837, when he reached the age of 14, the normal leaving age for a pupil not going on to university.

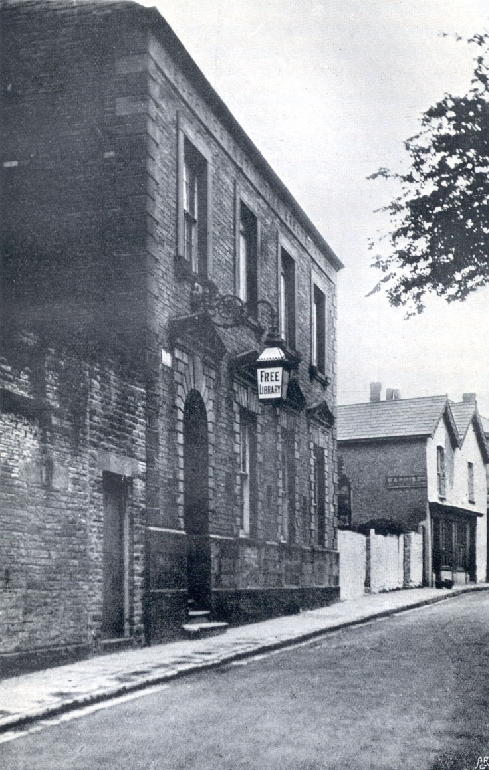
A photograph from Wallace's autobiography shows the building Wallace and his brother John designed and built for the Neath Mechanics' Institute.

Wallace then moved to London to board with his older brother John, a 19-year-old apprentice builder. This was a stopgap measure until William, his oldest brother, was ready to take him on as an apprentice surveyor. While in London, Alfred attended lectures and read books at the London Mechanics Institute. Here he was exposed to the radical political ideas of the Welsh social reformer Robert Owen and of the English-born political theorist Thomas Paine. He left London in 1837 to live with William and work as his apprentice for six years. They moved repeatedly to different places in Mid-Wales. Then at the end of 1839, they moved to Kington, Herefordshire, near the Welsh border, before eventually settling at Neath in Wales. Between 1840 and 1843, Wallace worked as a land surveyor in the countryside of the west of England and Wales. The natural history of his surroundings aroused his interest; from 1841 he collected flowers and plants as an amateur botanist.

One result of Wallace's early travels is a modern controversy about his nationality. Since he was born in Monmouthshire, some sources have considered him to be Welsh. Other historians have questioned this because neither of his parents were Welsh, his family only briefly lived in Monmouthshire, the Welsh people Wallace knew in his childhood considered him to be English, and because he consistently referred to himself as English rather than Welsh. One Wallace scholar has stated that the most reasonable interpretation is therefore that he was an Englishman born in Wales.

In 1843 Wallace's father died, and a decline in demand for surveying meant William's business no longer had work available. For a short time Wallace was unemployed, then early in 1844 he was engaged by the Collegiate School in Leicester to teach drawing, mapmaking, and surveying. He had already read George Combe's The Constitution of Man, and after Spencer Hall lectured on mesmerism, Wallace as well as some of the older pupils tried it out. Wallace spent many hours at the town library (Note: This was not the library now at Leicester Guildhall, known as the town library, more likely that at the Mechanics' Institute. The Old Town Hall Library of Leicester: A Catalogue) in Leicester; he read Thomas Robert Malthus's An Essay on the Principle of Population, Alexander von Humboldt's Personal Narrative, Charles Lyell's Principles of Geology and Charles Darwin's The Voyage of the Beagle. One evening Wallace met the entomologist Henry Walter Bates, who was 19 years old, and had published an 1843 paper on beetles in The Zoologist. He befriended Wallace and started him collecting insects.

When Wallace's brother William died in March 1845, Wallace left his teaching position to assume control of his brother's firm in Neath, but his brother John and he were unable to make the business work. After a few months, he found work as a civil engineer for a nearby firm that was working on a survey for a proposed railway in the Vale of Neath. Wallace's work on the survey was largely outdoors in the countryside, allowing him to indulge his new passion for collecting insects. Wallace persuaded his brother John to join him in starting another architecture and civil engineering firm. It carried out projects including the design of a building for the Neath Mechanics' Institute, founded in 1843. During this period, he exchanged letters with Bates about books. By the end of 1845, Wallace was convinced by Robert Chambers's anonymously published treatise on progressive development, Vestiges of the Natural History of Creation, but he found Bates was more critical. Wallace re-read Darwin's Journal, and on 11 April 1846 wrote "As the Journal of a scientific traveller, it is second only to Humboldt's 'Personal Narrative'—as a work of general interest, perhaps superior to it."

William Jevons, the founder of the Neath institute, was impressed by Wallace and persuaded him to give lectures there on science and engineering. In the autumn of 1846, Wallace and his brother John purchased a cottage near Neath, where they lived with their mother and sister Fanny.

=== Exploration and study of the natural world ===
==== South America ====
Inspired by the chronicles of earlier and contemporary travelling naturalists, Wallace decided to travel abroad. He later wrote that Darwin's Journal and Humboldt's Personal Narrative were "the two works to whose inspiration I owe my determination to visit the tropics as a collector." After reading A Voyage up the River Amazon by William Henry Edwards, Wallace and Bates estimated that by collecting and selling natural history specimens such as birds and insects they could meet their costs, with the prospect of good profits. They therefore engaged as their agent Samuel Stevens who would advertise and arrange sales to institutions and private collectors, for a commission of 20% on sales plus 5% on despatching freight and remittances of money.

In 1848, Wallace and Bates left for Brazil aboard the Mischief. They intended to collect insects and other animal specimens in the Amazon rainforest for their private collections, selling the duplicates to museums and collectors back in Britain to fund the trip. Wallace hoped to gather evidence of the transmutation of species. Bates and he spent most of their first year collecting near Belém, then explored inland separately, occasionally meeting to discuss their findings. In 1849, they were briefly joined by another young explorer, the botanist Richard Spruce, along with Wallace's younger brother Herbert. Herbert soon left (dying two years later from yellow fever), but Spruce, like Bates, would spend over ten years collecting in South America. Wallace spent four years exploring the Amazon river and its tributary the Rio Negro, collecting specimens and making notes on the peoples and languages he encountered as well as the geography, flora, and fauna.. Wallace spent August 1850 through May 1852 on the Rio Negro using his surveying skills to chart it and its tributary, the Uaupés, with sextant and compass. Wallace ascended the Uaupés all the way into Colombia.

On 12 July 1852, Wallace embarked for the UK on the brig Helen. After 25 days at sea, the ship's cargo caught fire, and the crew was forced to abandon ship. All the specimens Wallace had on the ship, mostly collected during the last, and most interesting, two years of his trip, were lost. He managed to save a few notes and pencil sketches, but little else. Wallace and the crew spent ten days in an open boat before being picked up by the brig Jordeson, which was sailing from Cuba to London. The Jordeson's provisions were strained by the unexpected passengers, but after a difficult passage on short rations, the ship reached its destination on 1 October 1852.

The lost collection had been insured for £200 by Stevens. After his return to Britain, Wallace spent 18 months in London living on the insurance payment, and selling a few specimens that had been shipped home. During this period, despite having lost almost all the notes from his South American expedition, he wrote six academic papers (including "On the Monkeys of the Amazon") and two books, Palm Trees of the Amazon and Their Uses and Travels on the Amazon. At the same time, he made connections with several other British naturalists.

==== East Indies ====
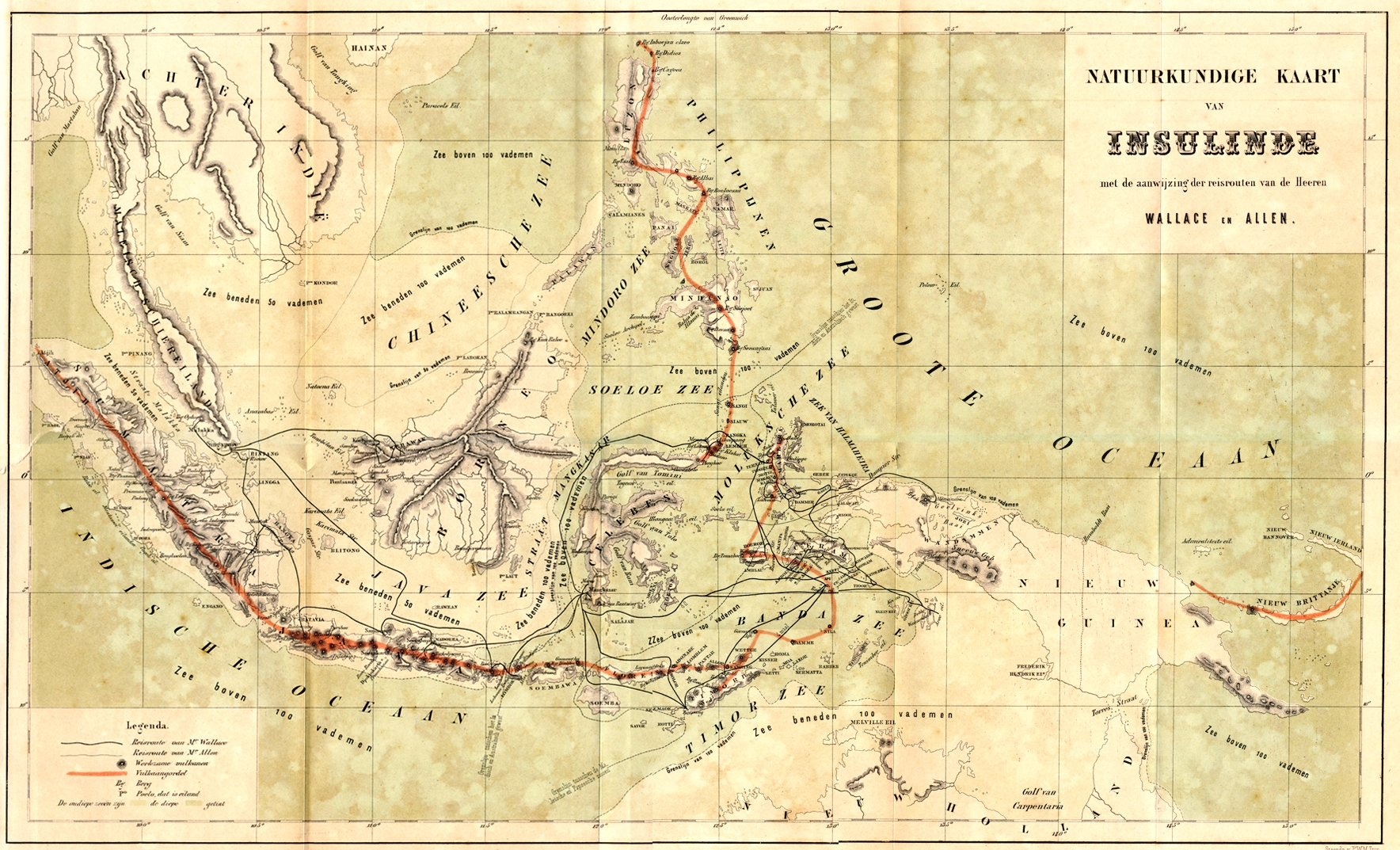
A map from The Malay Archipelago shows the physical geography of the archipelago and Wallace's travels around the area. The thin black lines indicate where Wallace travelled; the red lines indicate chains of volcanoes.

Bates and others were collecting in the Amazon area, Wallace was more interested in new opportunities in the Malay Archipelago as demonstrated by the travel writings of Ida Laura Pfeiffer, and valuable insect specimens she collected which Stevens sold as her agent. In March 1853 Wallace wrote to Sir James Brooke, Rajah of Sarawak, who was then in London, and who arranged assistance in Sarawak for Wallace. In June Wallace wrote to Murchison at the Royal Geographical Society (RGS) for support, proposing to again fund his exploring entirely from sale of duplicate collections. He later recalled that, while researching in the insect-room of the British Museum, he was introduced to Darwin and they "had a few minutes' conversation." After presenting a paper and a large map of the Rio Negro to the RGS, Wallace was elected a Fellow of the society on 27 February 1854. Free passage arranged on Royal Navy ships was stalled by the Crimean War, but eventually the RGS funded first class travel by P&O steamships. Wallace and a young assistant, Charles Allen, embarked at Southampton on 4 March 1854. After the overland journey to Suez and another change of ship at Ceylon they disembarked at Singapore on 19 April 1854.

From 1854 to 1862, Wallace travelled around the islands of the Malay Archipelago or East Indies (now Singapore, Malaysia and Indonesia). His main objective "was to obtain specimens of natural history, both for my private collection and to supply duplicates to museums and amateurs". In addition to Allen, he "generally employed one or two, and sometimes three Malay servants" as assistants, and paid large numbers of local people at various places to bring specimens. His total was 125,660 specimens, most of which were insects including more than 83,000 beetles. Several thousand of the specimens represented species new to science. Overall, more than thirty men worked for him at some stage as full-time paid collectors. He also hired guides, porters, cooks and boat crews, so well over 100 individuals worked for him.

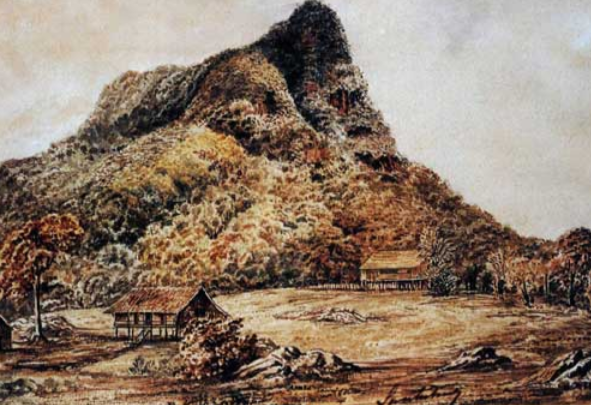
Mount Santubong around 1855, watercolour by missionary Harriette McDougall

After collecting expeditions to Bukit Timah Hill in Singapore, and to Malacca, Wallace and Allen reached Sarawak in October 1854, and were welcomed at Kuching by Sir James Brooke's (then) heir Captain John Brooke. Wallace hired a Malay named Ali as a general servant and cook, and spent the early 1855 wet season in a small Dyak house at the foot of Mount Santubong, overlooking a branch outlet of the Sarawak River. He read about species distribution, notes on Pictets's Palaeontology, and wrote his "Sarawak Paper". In March he moved to the Simunjon coal-works, operated by the Borneo Company under Ludvig Verner Helms, and supplemented collecting by paying workers a cent for each insect. A specimen of the previously unknown gliding tree frog Rhacophorus nigropalmatus (now called Wallace's flying frog) came from a Chinese workman who told Wallace that it glided down. Local people also assisted with shooting orangutans. They spent time with Sir James, then in February 1856 Allen chose to stay on with the missionaries at Kuching.

On reaching Singapore in May 1856, Wallace hired a bird-skinner. With Ali as cook, they collected for two days on Bali, then from 17 June to 30 August on Lombok. In December 1856, Darwin had written to contacts worldwide to get specimens for his continuing research into variation under domestication. At Lombok's port city, Ampanam, Wallace wrote telling his agent, Stevens, about specimens shipped, including a domestic duck variety "for Mr. Darwin & he would perhaps also like the jungle cock, which is often domesticated here & is doubtless one of the originals of the domestic breed of poultry." In the same letter, Wallace said birds from Bali and Lombok, divided by a narrow strait, "belong to two quite distinct zoological provinces, of which they form the extreme limits", Java, Borneo, Sumatra and Malacca, and Australia and the Moluccas. Stevens arranged publication of relevant paragraphs in the January 1857 issue of The Zoologist. After further investigation, the zoogeographical boundary eventually became known as the Wallace Line.

Ali became Wallace's most trusted assistant, a skilled collector and researcher. Wallace collected and preserved the delicate insect specimens, while most of the birds were collected and prepared by his assistants; of those, Ali collected and prepared around 5000. While exploring the archipelago, Wallace refined his thoughts about evolution, and had his famous insight on natural selection. In 1858 he sent an article outlining his theory to Darwin; it was published, along with a description of Darwin's theory, that same year.

Accounts of Wallace's studies and adventures were eventually published in 1869 as The Malay Archipelago. This became one of the most popular books of scientific exploration of the 19th century, and has never been out of print. It was praised by scientists such as Darwin (to whom the book was dedicated), by Lyell, and by non-scientists such as the novelist Joseph Conrad. Conrad called the book his "favorite bedside companion" and used information from it for several of his novels, especially Lord Jim. A set of 80 bird skeletons Wallace collected in Indonesia are held in the Cambridge University Museum of Zoology, and described as of exceptional historical significance.

Specimens and illustrations
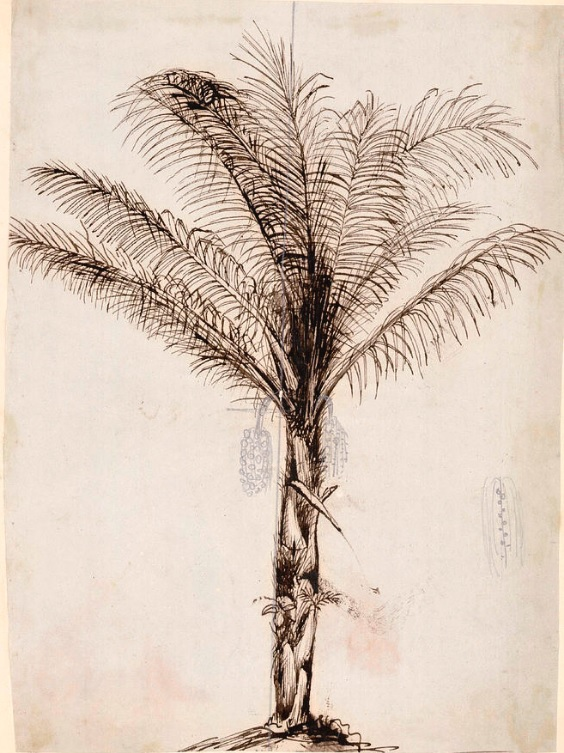
Arenga pinnata sketched by Wallace in Celebes, reworked by Walter Hood Fitch

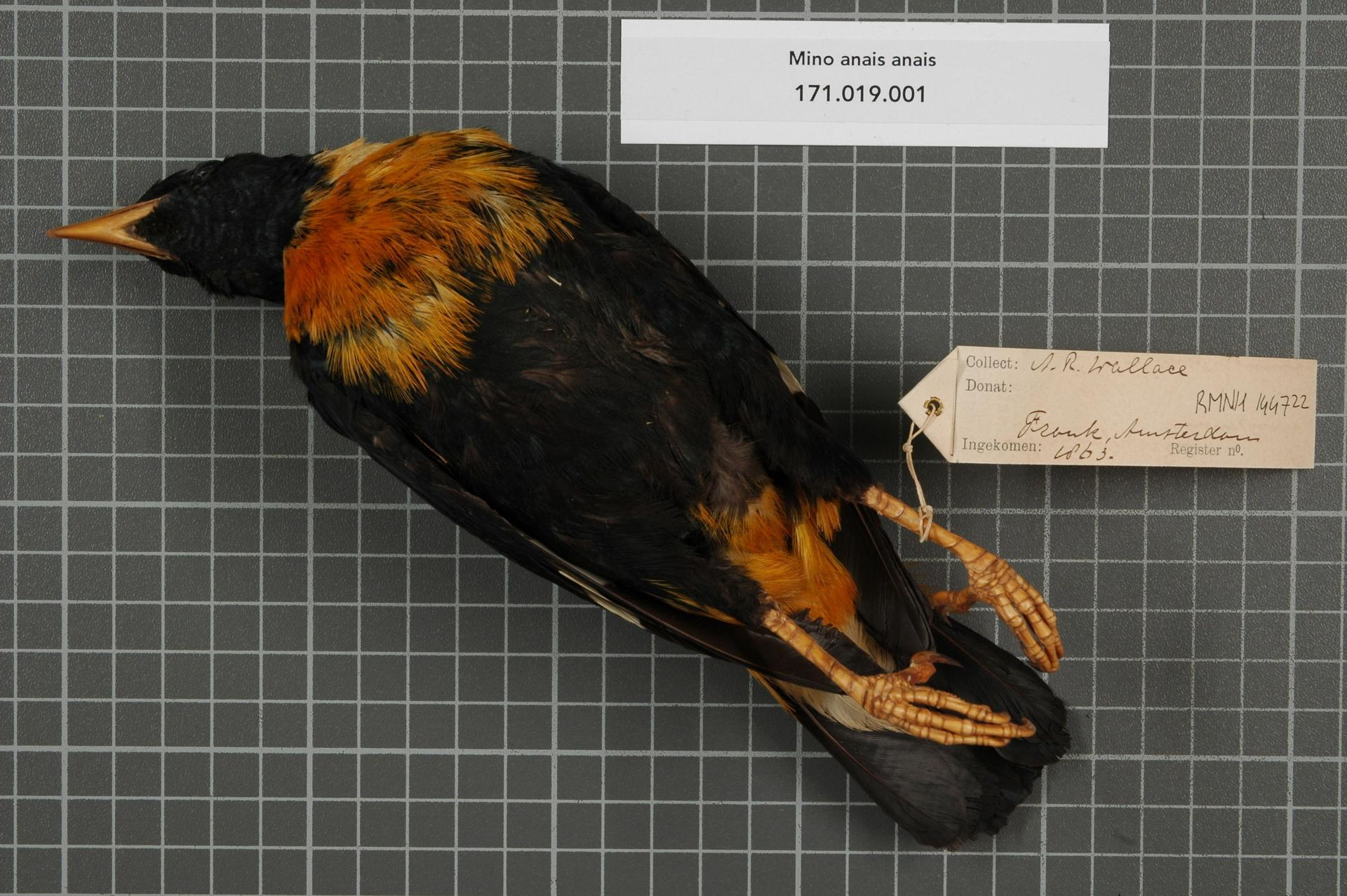
Wallace collected many specimens, such as this Mino anais anais from South West Papua, 1863.

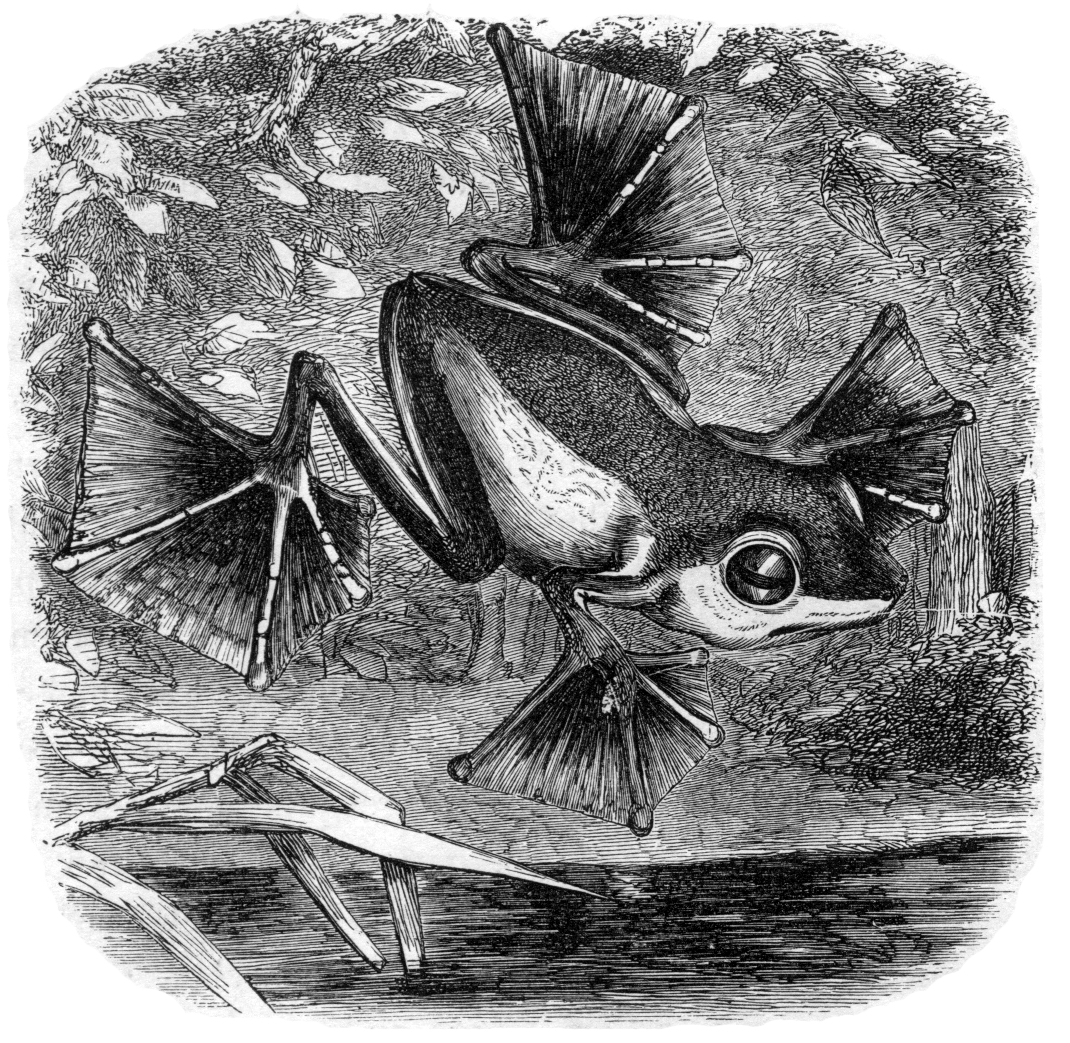
An illustration from The Malay Archipelago depicts the flying frog that a workman handed to Wallace.

=== Return to Britain, marriage and children ===
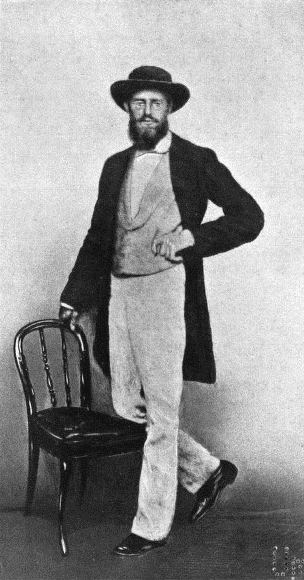
A photograph of Wallace taken in Singapore in 1862

In 1862, Wallace returned to Britain, where he moved in with his sister Fanny Sims and her husband Thomas. While recovering from his travels, Wallace organised his collections and gave numerous lectures about his adventures and discoveries to scientific societies such as the Zoological Society of London. Later that year, he visited Darwin at Down House, and became friendly with both Lyell and the philosopher Herbert Spencer. During the 1860s, Wallace wrote papers and gave lectures defending natural selection. He corresponded with Darwin about topics including sexual selection, warning coloration, and the possible effect of natural selection on hybridisation and the divergence of species. In 1865, he began investigating spiritualism.

After a year of courtship, Wallace became engaged in 1864 to a young woman whom, in his autobiography, he would only identify as Miss L. Miss L. was the daughter of Lewis Leslie who played chess with Wallace, but to Wallace's great dismay, she broke off the engagement. In 1866, Wallace married Annie Mitten. Wallace had been introduced to Mitten through the botanist Richard Spruce, who had befriended Wallace in Brazil and who was a friend of Annie Mitten's father, William Mitten, an expert on mosses. In 1872, Wallace built the Dell, a house of concrete, on land he leased in Grays in Essex, where he lived until 1876. The Wallaces had three children: Herbert (1867–1874), Violet (1869–1945), and William (1871–1951).

=== Financial struggles ===
In the late 1860s and 1870s, Wallace was very concerned about the financial security of his family. While he was in the Malay Archipelago, the sale of specimens had brought in a considerable amount of money, which had been carefully invested by the agent who sold the specimens for Wallace. On his return to the UK, Wallace made a series of bad investments in railways and mines that squandered most of the money, and he found himself badly in need of the proceeds from the publication of The Malay Archipelago.

Despite assistance from his friends, he was never able to secure a permanent salaried position such as a curatorship in a museum. To remain financially solvent, Wallace worked grading government examinations, wrote 25 papers for publication between 1872 and 1876 for various modest sums, and was paid by Lyell and Darwin to help edit some of their works. In 1876, Wallace needed a £500 advance from the publisher of The Geographical Distribution of Animals to avoid having to sell some of his personal property.

Darwin was very aware of Wallace's financial difficulties and lobbied long and hard to get Wallace awarded a government pension for his lifetime contributions to science. When the £200 annual pension was awarded in 1881, it helped to stabilise Wallace's financial position by supplementing the income from his writings.

=== Social and political activism ===
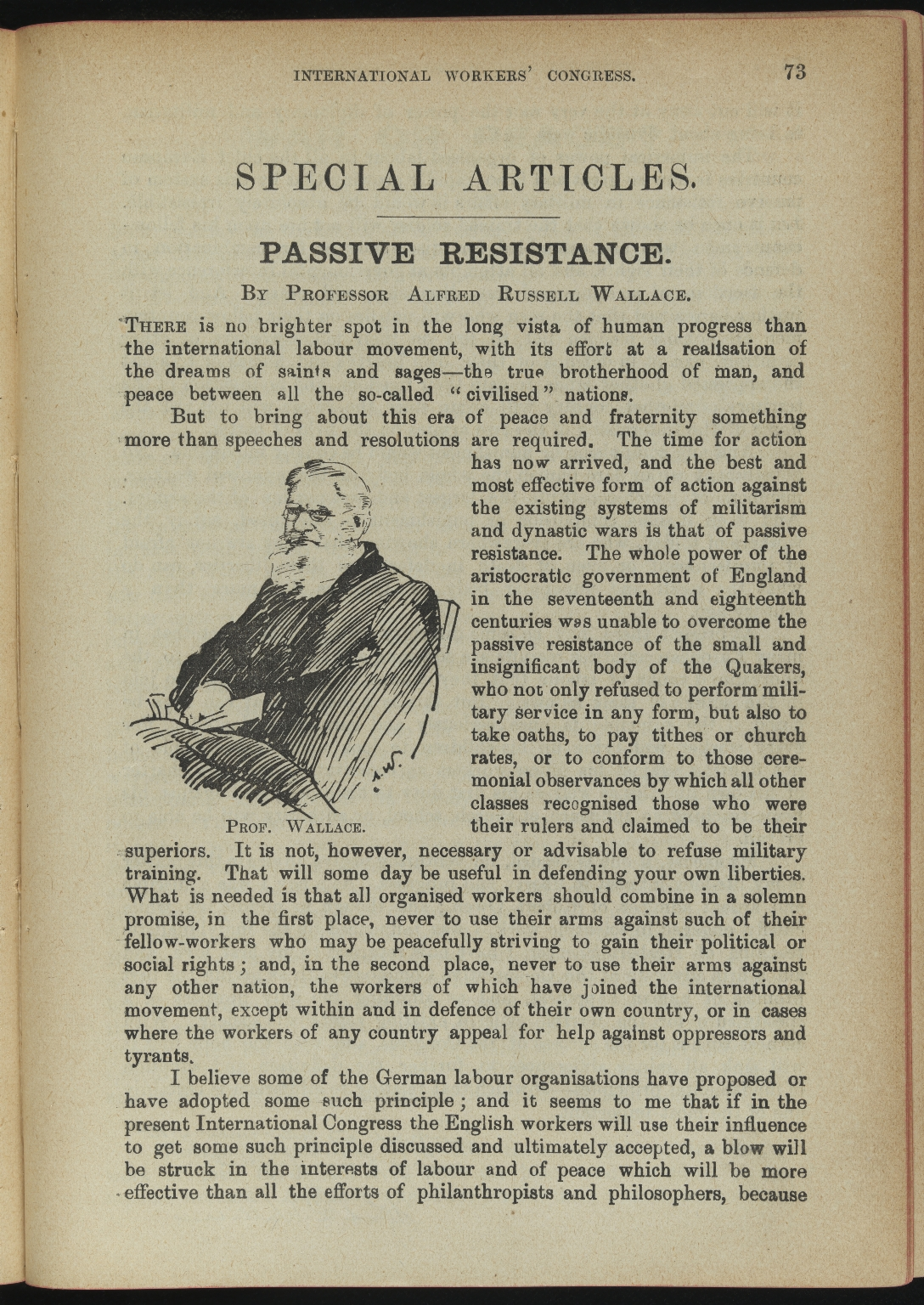
Article written by Wallace, published in the report of the proceedings of the International Worker's Congress

==== Land Nationalization and Socialism ====
In 1881, Wallace was elected as the first president of the newly formed Land Nationalisation Society. In the next year, he published a book, Land Nationalisation; Its Necessity and Its Aims, on the subject. In 1889, Wallace read Looking Backward by Edward Bellamy and declared himself a socialist, despite his earlier foray as a speculative investor. After reading Progress and Poverty, the bestselling book by the progressive land reformist Henry George, Wallace described it as "Undoubtedly the most remarkable and important book of the present century."

==== Opposition to Eugenics ====
Wallace opposed eugenics, an idea supported by other prominent 19th-century evolutionary thinkers, on the grounds that contemporary society was too corrupt and unjust to allow any reasonable determination of who was fit or unfit. In his 1890 article "Human Selection" he wrote, "Those who succeed in the race for wealth are by no means the best or the most intelligent ..." He said, "The world does not want the eugenicist to set it straight," "Give the people good conditions, improve their environment, and all will tend towards the highest type. Eugenics is simply the meddlesome interference of an arrogant, scientific priestcraft."

==== Opposition to militarism ====
Wallace wrote repeatedly on the dangers and wastefulness of militarism. In an 1899 essay, he called for popular opinion to be rallied against warfare by showing people "that all modern wars are dynastic; that they are caused by the ambition, the interests, the jealousies, and the insatiable greed of power of their rulers, or of the great mercantile and financial classes which have power and influence over their rulers; and that the results of war are never good for the people, who yet bear all its burthens (burdens)". In a letter published by the Daily Mail in 1909, with aviation in its infancy, he advocated an international treaty to ban the military use of aircraft, arguing against the idea "that this new horror is 'inevitable', and that all we can do is to be sure and be in the front rank of the aerial assassins—for surely no other term can so fitly describe the dropping of, say, ten thousand bombs at midnight into an enemy's capital from an invisible flight of airships."

==== Trade, monetary policy, and women's suffrage ====
Wallace criticised the UK's free trade policies for the negative impact they had on working-class people. In 1898, he wrote a paper advocating a pure paper money system, not backed by silver or gold, which impressed the economist Irving Fisher so much that he dedicated his 1920 book Stabilizing the Dollar to Wallace. Wallace wrote in support of women's suffrage. In a letter read at a 1909 woman's suffrage meeting and published in The Times Wallace stated that he had long supported women having the vote, because he believed that it was a fundamental principle that all human beings living in a country, including women, should have the same legal rights and liberties.

==== Books on social reform ====
The Revolt of Democracy (1913)

In 1898, Wallace published The Wonderful Century: Its Successes and Its Failures, about developments in the 19th century. The first part of the book covered the major scientific and technical advances of the century; the second part covered what Wallace considered to be its social failures including the destruction and waste of wars and arms races, the rise of the urban poor and the dangerous conditions in which they lived and worked, a harsh criminal justice system that failed to reform criminals, abuses in a mental health system based on privately owned sanatoriums, the environmental damage caused by capitalism, and the evils of European colonialism. Wallace continued his social activism for the rest of his life, publishing the book The Revolt of Democracy just weeks before his death.

=== Further scientific work ===
In 1880, he published Island Life as a sequel to The Geographic Distribution of Animals. In November 1886, Wallace began a ten-month trip to the United States to give a series of popular lectures. Most of the lectures were on Darwinism (evolution through natural selection), but he also gave speeches on biogeography, spiritualism, and socio-economic reform. During the trip, he was reunited with his brother John who had emigrated to California years before. He spent a day touring Yosemite in the company of John Muir. Years later Muir would credit his conversation with Wallace with sparking his interest in visiting the Amazon basin. He then spent a week in Colorado, with the American botanist Alice Eastwood as his guide, exploring the flora of the Rocky Mountains and gathering evidence that would lead him to a theory on how glaciation might explain certain commonalities between the mountain flora of Europe, Asia and North America, which he published in 1891 in the paper "English and American Flowers". He met many other prominent American naturalists and viewed their collections. His 1889 book Darwinism used information he collected on his American trip and information he had compiled for the lectures.

=== Death ===
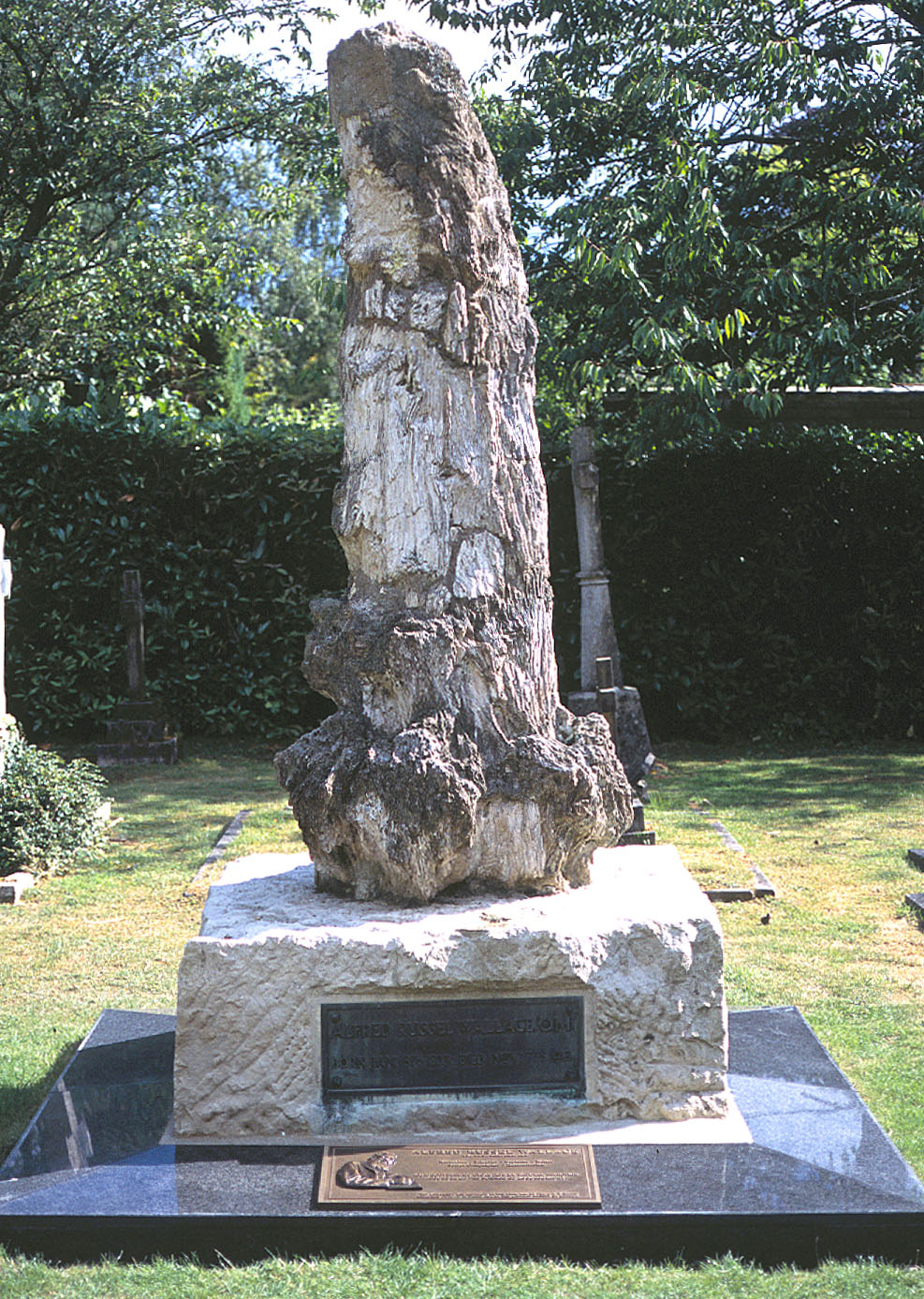
Wallace's grave in Broadstone Cemetery, Dorset, restored by the A. R. Wallace Memorial Fund in 2000. It features a fossil tree trunk 7 feet (2.1 m) tall from Portland, mounted on a block of Purbeck limestone.

On 7 November 1913, Wallace died at home, aged 90, in the country house he called Old Orchard, which he had built a decade earlier. His death was widely reported in the press. The New York Times called him "the last of the giants [belonging] to that wonderful group of intellectuals composed of Darwin, Huxley, Spencer, Lyell, Owen, and other scientists, whose daring investigations revolutionized and evolutionized the thought of the century". Another commentator in the same edition said: "No apology need be made for the few literary or scientific follies of the author of that great book on the 'Malay Archipelago'." (Vol.1, Vol.2)

Some of Wallace's friends suggested that he be buried in Westminster Abbey, but his wife followed his wishes and had him buried in the small cemetery at Broadstone, Dorset. Several prominent British scientists formed a committee to have a medallion of Wallace placed in Westminster Abbey near where Darwin had been buried. The medallion was unveiled on 1 November 1915.

== Theory of evolution ==
=== Early evolutionary thinking ===
Wallace began his career as a travelling naturalist already believing in the transmutation of species. The concept had been advocated by Jean-Baptiste Lamarck, Geoffroy Saint-Hilaire, Erasmus Darwin, and Robert Grant, among others. It was widely discussed, but not generally accepted by leading naturalists, and was considered to have radical, even revolutionary connotations. Prominent anatomists and geologists such as Georges Cuvier, Richard Owen, Adam Sedgwick, and Lyell attacked transmutation vigorously. It has been suggested that Wallace accepted the idea of the transmutation of species in part because he was always inclined to favour radical ideas in politics, religion and science, and because he was unusually open to marginal, even fringe, ideas in science.

Wallace was profoundly influenced by Robert Chambers's Vestiges of the Natural History of Creation, a controversial work of popular science published anonymously in 1844. It advocated an evolutionary origin for the Solar System, the Earth, and living things. Wallace wrote to Henry Bates in 1845 describing it as "an ingenious hypothesis strongly supported by some striking facts and analogies, but which remains to be proven by ... more research". In 1847, he wrote to Bates that he would "like to take some one family [of beetles] to study thoroughly, ... with a view to the theory of the origin of species."

Wallace planned fieldwork to test the evolutionary hypothesis that closely related species should inhabit neighbouring territories. During his work in the Amazon basin, he came to realise that geographical barriers—such as the Amazon and its major tributaries—often separated the ranges of closely allied species. He included these observations in his 1853 paper "On the Monkeys of the Amazon". Near the end of the paper he asked the question, "Are very closely allied species ever separated by a wide interval of country?".

=== Sarawak Law Paper ===
For sometime Wallace had been compiling notes for an argument against the concept of new species being introduced through progressive creationism found in Charles Lyell's Principles of Geology. This was Lyell's rebuttal to transmutational ideas. When Wallace read an 1854 paper written by Edward Forbes that proposed an even more quasi-mystical form of progressive creationism he decided to write a response. In February 1855, while working in Sarawak on the island of Borneo, Wallace wrote "On the Law which has Regulated the Introduction of New Species". The paper was published in the Annals and Magazine of Natural History in September 1855. In this paper, he discussed observations of the geographic and geologic distribution of both living and fossil species, a field that became biogeography. His observation (his notebook shows it was inspired by Pictet's Palaeontology) that "Every species has come into existence coincident both in space and time with a closely allied species" has come to be known as the "Sarawak Law", answering his own question in his paper on the monkeys of the Amazon basin. Although it does not mention possible mechanisms for evolution or even explicitly discuss transmutation, it did say that each new species was a small variation on an already existing species and that this process resulted in a branching tree of relationships between species that should be the basis of taxonomic classification. This paper foreshadowed the momentous paper he would write three years later.

The paper challenged Lyell's belief that species were immutable. Although Darwin had written to him in 1842 expressing support for transmutation, Lyell had continued to be strongly opposed to the idea. Around the start of 1856, he told Darwin about Wallace's paper, as did Edward Blyth who thought it "Good! Upon the whole! ... Wallace has, I think put the matter well; and according to his theory the various domestic races of animals have been fairly developed into species." Despite this hint, Darwin mistook Wallace's conclusion for the progressive creationism of the time, writing that it was "nothing very new ... Uses my simile of tree [but] it seems all creation with him." Lyell was more impressed, and opened a notebook on species in which he grappled with the consequences, particularly for human ancestry. Darwin had already shown his theory to their mutual friend Joseph Hooker and now, for the first time spelt out the full details of natural selection to Lyell. Although Lyell could not agree, he urged Darwin to publish to establish priority. Darwin demurred at first, but began writing up a species sketch of his continuing work in May 1856.

=== Natural selection and Darwin ===
By February 1858, Wallace had been convinced by his biogeographical research in the Malay Archipelago that evolution was real. He later wrote in his autobiography that the problem was of how species change from one well-marked form to another. He stated that it was while he was in bed with a fever that he thought about Malthus's idea of positive checks on human population, and had the idea of natural selection. His autobiography says that he was on the island of Ternate at the time; but the evidence of his journal suggests that he was in fact on the island of Gilolo. From 1858 to 1861, he rented a house on Ternate from the Dutchman Maarten Dirk van Renesse van Duivenbode, which he used as a base for expeditions to other islands such as Gilolo.

Wallace describes how he discovered natural selection as follows:

It then occurred to me that these causes or their equivalents are continually acting in the case of animals also; and as animals usually breed much more quickly than does mankind, the destruction every year from these causes must be enormous to keep down the numbers of each species, since evidently they do not increase regularly from year to year, as otherwise the world would long ago have been crowded with those that breed most quickly. Vaguely thinking over the enormous and constant destruction which this implied, it occurred to me to ask the question, why do some die and some live? And the answer was clearly, on the whole the best fitted live ... and considering the amount of individual variation that my experience as a collector had shown me to exist, then it followed that all the changes necessary for the adaptation of the species to the changing conditions would be brought about ... In this way every part of an animals organization could be modified exactly as required, and in the very process of this modification the unmodified would die out, and thus the definite characters and the clear isolation of each new species would be explained.

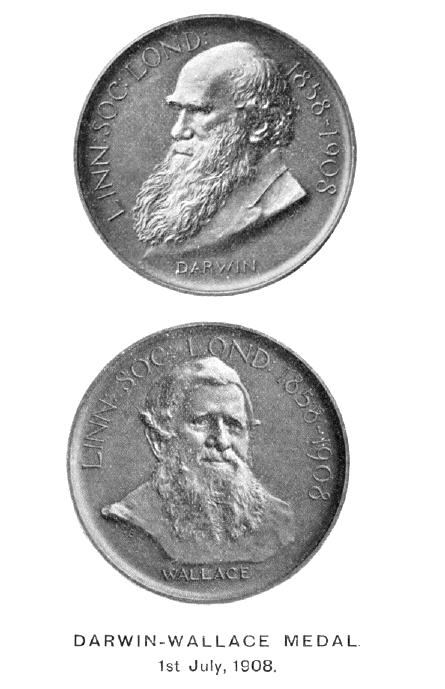
The Darwin–Wallace Medal was issued by the Linnean Society on the 50th anniversary of the reading of Darwin and Wallace's papers on natural selection. Wallace received the only gold example.

Wallace had once briefly met Darwin, and was one of the correspondents whose observations Darwin used to support his own theories. Although Wallace's first letter to Darwin has been lost, Wallace carefully kept the letters he received. In the first letter, dated 1 May 1857, Darwin commented that Wallace's letter of 10 October which he had recently received, as well as Wallace's paper "On the Law which has regulated the Introduction of New Species" of 1855, showed that they thought alike, with similar conclusions, and said that he was preparing his own work for publication in about two years time. The second letter, dated 22 December 1857, said how glad he was that Wallace was theorising about distribution, adding that "without speculation there is no good and original observation" but commented that "I believe I go much further than you". Wallace believed this and sent Darwin his February 1858 essay, "On the Tendency of Varieties to Depart Indefinitely From the Original Type", asking Darwin to review it and pass it to Charles Lyell if he thought it worthwhile. Although Wallace had sent several articles for journal publication during his travels through the Malay archipelago, the Ternate essay was in a private letter. Darwin received the essay on 18 June 1858. Although the essay did not use Darwin's term "natural selection", it did outline the mechanics of an evolutionary divergence of species from similar ones due to environmental pressures. In this sense, it was very similar to the theory that Darwin had worked on for 20 years, but had yet to publish. Darwin sent the manuscript to Charles Lyell with a letter saying "he could not have made a better short abstract! Even his terms now stand as heads of my chapters ... he does not say he wishes me to publish, but I shall, of course, at once write and offer to send to any journal." Distraught about the illness of his baby son, Darwin put the problem to Charles Lyell and Joseph Hooker, who decided to publish the essay in a joint presentation together with unpublished writings which highlighted Darwin's priority. Wallace's essay was presented to the Linnean Society of London on 1 July 1858, along with excerpts from an essay which Darwin had disclosed privately to Hooker in 1847 and a letter Darwin had written to Asa Gray in 1857.

Communication with Wallace in the far-off Malay Archipelago involved months of delay, so he was not part of this rapid publication. Wallace accepted the arrangement after the fact, happy that he had been included at all, and never expressed bitterness in public or in private. Darwin's social and scientific status was far greater than Wallace's, and it was unlikely that, without Darwin, Wallace's views on evolution would have been taken seriously. Lyell and Hooker's arrangement relegated Wallace to the position of co-discoverer, and he was not the social equal of Darwin or the other prominent British natural scientists. All the same, the joint reading of their papers on natural selection associated Wallace with the more famous Darwin. This, combined with Darwin's (as well as Hooker's and Lyell's) advocacy on his behalf, would give Wallace greater access to the highest levels of the scientific community. The reaction to the reading was muted, with the president of the Linnean Society remarking in May 1859 that the year had not been marked by any striking discoveries; but, with Darwin's publication of On the Origin of Species later in 1859, its significance became apparent. When Wallace returned to the UK, he met Darwin. Although some of Wallace's opinions in the ensuing years would test Darwin's patience, they remained friends and frequent correspondents for the rest of Darwin's life.

Over the years, a few people have questioned this version of events. In the early 1980s, two books, one by Arnold Brackman and another by John Langdon Brooks, suggested not only that there had been a conspiracy to rob Wallace of his proper credit, but that Darwin had actually stolen a key idea from Wallace to finish his own theory. These claims have been examined and found unconvincing by a number of scholars. Shipping schedules show that, contrary to these accusations, Wallace's letter could not have been delivered earlier than the date shown in Darwin's letter to Lyell.

==== Defence of Darwin and his ideas ====
After Wallace returned to England in 1862, he became one of the staunchest defenders of Darwin's On the Origin of Species. In an incident in 1863 that particularly pleased Darwin, Wallace published the short paper "Remarks on the Rev. S. Haughton's Paper on the Bee's Cell, And on the Origin of Species". This rebutted a paper by a professor of geology at the University of Dublin that had sharply criticised Darwin's comments in the Origin on how hexagonal honey bee cells could have evolved through natural selection. An even longer defence was an 1867 article in the Quarterly Journal of Science, "Creation by Law". It reviewed George Campbell, the 8th Duke of Argyll's book, The Reign of Law, which aimed to refute natural selection. After an 1870 meeting of the British Science Association, Wallace wrote to Darwin complaining that there were "no opponents left who know anything of natural history, so that there are none of the good discussions we used to have".

Explorers in Madagascar had discovered the orchid Angraecum sesquipedale, with a sixteen-inch nectary. Darwin predicted the existence of a moth with a proboscis long enough to pollinate it. In a footnote to "Creation by Law", Wallace wrote "That such a moth exists in Madagascar may be safely predicted; and naturalists who visit that island should search for it with as much confidence as astronomers searched for the planet Neptune,—and they will be equally successful!" Such a moth was discovered, and dubbed Xanthopan morganii praedicta in honor of Wallace's prediction.

==== Differences between Darwin and Wallace ====
Historians of science have noted that, while Darwin considered the ideas in Wallace's paper to be essentially the same as his own, there were differences. Darwin emphasised competition between individuals of the same species to survive and reproduce, whereas Wallace emphasised environmental pressures on varieties and species forcing them to become adapted to their local conditions, leading populations in different locations to diverge. The historian of science Peter J. Bowler has suggested that in the paper he mailed to Darwin, Wallace might have been discussing group selection. Against this, Malcolm Kottler showed that Wallace was indeed discussing individual variation and selection.

Others have noted that Wallace appeared to have envisioned natural selection as a kind of feedback mechanism that kept species and varieties adapted to their environment (now called 'stabilizing", as opposed to 'directional' selection). They point to a largely overlooked passage of Wallace's famous 1858 paper, in which he likened "this principle ... [to] the centrifugal governor of the steam engine, which checks and corrects any irregularities". The cybernetician and anthropologist Gregory Bateson observed in the 1970s that, although writing it only as an example, Wallace had "probably said the most powerful thing that'd been said in the 19th Century". Bateson revisited the topic in his 1979 book Mind and Nature: A Necessary Unity, and other scholars have continued to explore the connection between natural selection and systems theory.

==== Warning colouration and sexual selection ====
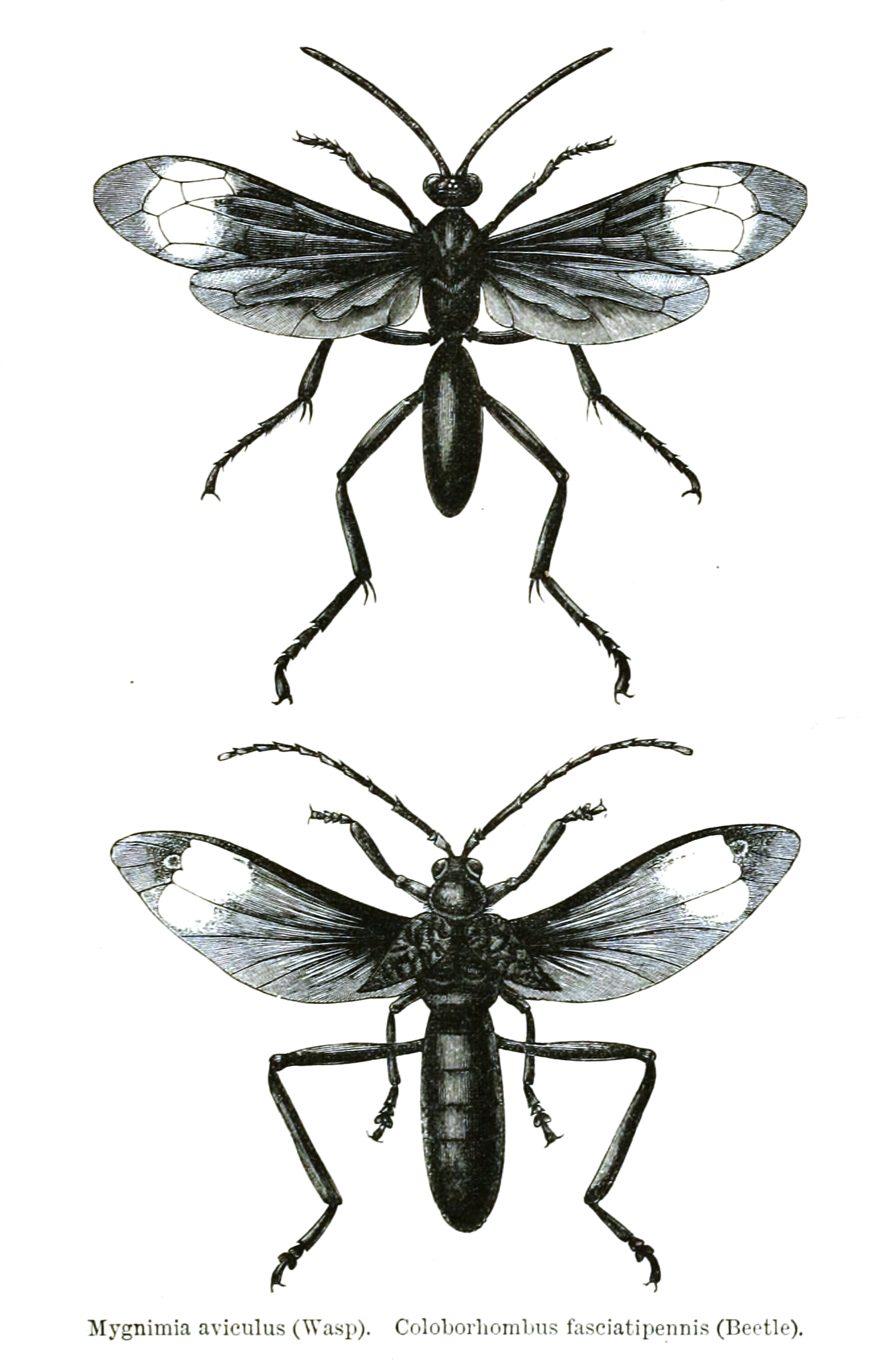
Illustration of Batesian mimicry: a wasp (top) mimicked by a beetle in Wallace's 1889 book Darwinism

Warning colouration was one of Wallace's contributions to the evolutionary biology of animal colouration. In 1867, Darwin wrote to Wallace about a problem in explaining how some caterpillars could have evolved conspicuous colour schemes. Darwin had come to believe that many conspicuous animal colour schemes were due to sexual selection, but he saw that this could not apply to caterpillars. Wallace responded that he and Bates had observed that many of the most spectacular butterflies had a peculiar odour and taste, and that he had been told by John Jenner Weir that birds would not eat a certain kind of common white moth because they found it unpalatable. Since the moth was as conspicuous at dusk as a coloured caterpillar in daylight, it seemed likely that the conspicuous colours served as a warning to predators and thus could have evolved through natural selection. Darwin was impressed by the idea. At a later meeting of the Entomological Society, and in a letter published in Field magazine, Wallace asked for any evidence anyone might have on the topic. In 1869, Weir published data from experiments and observations involving brightly coloured caterpillars that supported Wallace's idea.

Wallace attributed less importance than Darwin to sexual selection. One area where he debated Darwin involved explaining sexual dimorphism in the colouration and nesting behaviour of many bird species where males are more brightly coloured than females. Darwin attributed this to sexual selection by females between competing males. In the 1860s Wallace wrote a series of papers that emphasized instead selective pressure from predation for drab colouration in females that spend a lot of time sitting on nests. In his 1878 book Tropical Nature and Other Essays, he wrote extensively about the colouration of animals and plants, and proposed alternative explanations for a number of cases Darwin had attributed to sexual selection. He revisited the topic at length in his 1889 book Darwinism. In 1890, he wrote a critical review in Nature of his friend Edward Bagnall Poulton's The Colours of Animals which supported Darwin on sexual selection, attacking especially Poulton's claims on the "aesthetic preferences of the insect world".

==== Wallace effect ====
In 1889, Wallace wrote the book Darwinism, which explained and defended natural selection. In it, he proposed the hypothesis that natural selection could drive the reproductive isolation of two varieties by encouraging the development of barriers against hybridisation. Thus it might contribute to the development of new species. He suggested the following scenario: When two populations of a species had diverged beyond a certain point, each adapted to particular conditions, hybrid offspring would be less adapted than either parent form and so natural selection would tend to eliminate the hybrids. Furthermore, under such conditions, natural selection would favour the development of barriers to hybridisation, as individuals that avoided hybrid matings would tend to have more fit offspring, and thus contribute to the reproductive isolation of the two incipient species. This idea came to be known as the Wallace effect, later called reinforcement. He was motivated to spell the idea out in detail in 1889 in response to a paper by George Romanes that suggested that natural selection alone was insufficient to explain the separation of incipient species. Wallace had suggested to Darwin that natural selection could play a role in preventing hybridisation in private correspondence as early as 1868, but had not worked it out in detail. It continues to be a topic of research in evolutionary biology today, with both computer simulation and empirical results supporting its validity.

=== Evolution of humans ===
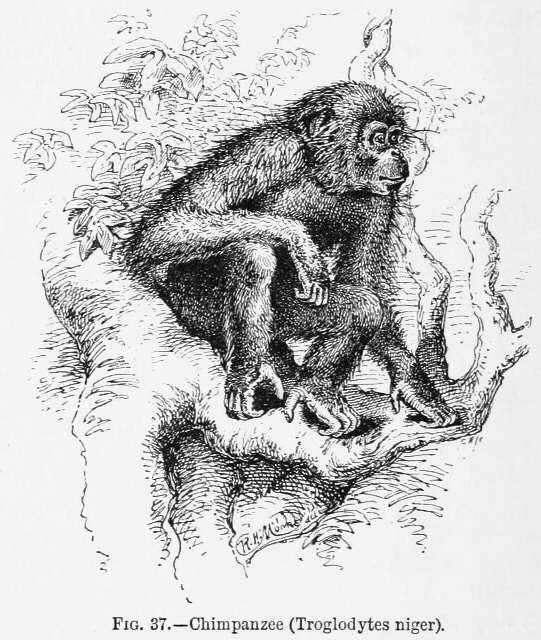
An illustration from the chapter on the application of natural selection to humans in Wallace's 1889 book Darwinism shows a chimpanzee.

In January 1864 Wallace presented a paper, "On the Varieties of Man in the Malay Archipelago", to the Ethnological Society of London. This paper summarized his ethnological observations during his travels in the East Indies. Wallace stated that the people in the archipelago could be divided into two groups. The first were members of what he called the Malay race and the second were members of the Papuan race. He described the physical, linguistic, and cultural differences between them, and he traced an east west dividing line that separated the 2 groups. He compared this with the famous dividing line he had discovered between Asian and Australian affiliated faunas, suggesting that the distribution of human races could be explained by the geographical history of a region the same way as the biogeographical distribution of species.

A few weeks later he presented a follow up paper, "The Origin of Human Races and the Antiquity of Man Deduced from the Theory of 'Natural Selection'" to the Anthropological Society of London, applying the theory of natural selection to humankind. Darwin had not yet publicly addressed the subject, although Thomas Huxley had in Evidence as to Man's Place in Nature. Wallace explained the apparent stability of the human stock by pointing to the vast gap in cranial capacities between humans and the great apes. Unlike some other Darwinists, including Darwin himself, he did not "regard modern primitives as almost filling the gap between man and ape". He saw the evolution of humans in two stages: achieving a bipedal posture that freed the hands to carry out the dictates of the brain, and the "recognition of the human brain as a totally new factor in the history of life". Wallace seems to have been the first evolutionist to propose that the human brain effectively made further specialisation of the body unnecessary. This idea, that during the late stages of human evolution natural selection would act more on the mental facilities than on the physical form of the body, captured the imagination of Charles Darwin, who a few years later would write to Wallace that this paper was the best ever to be published in the Anthropological Review. Darwin would treat this idea at length in his 1871 work The Descent of Man, and Selection in Relation to Sex.

Wallace wrote the paper to address the debate between the supporters of monogenism, the belief that all human races shared a common ancestor and were part of one species, and the supporters of polygenism, who held that different races had separate origins and were different species. Wallace's anthropological observations of Native Americans in the Amazon, and especially his time living among the Dayak people of Borneo, had convinced him that human beings were a single species with a common ancestor. He still felt that natural selection might have continued to act on mental faculties after the development of the different races; and he did not dispute the nearly universal view among European anthropologists of the time that Europeans were intellectually superior to other races. In 1864, in the aforementioned paper, he stated "It is the same great law of the preservation of favored races in the struggle for life, which leads to the inevitable extinction of all those low and mentally undeveloped populations with which Europeans come in contact." He argued that the natives die out due to an unequal struggle. Charles Lyell wrote to Wallace praising the paper and saying that it had made a major contribution to resolving the dispute between monogenists and polygenists.

==== Teleology and non-material causes in evolution ====
Prior to 1864, Wallace believed that humans were a result of only natural selection, however, by 1869 Wallace had changed his view since he felt that natural selection was an insufficient mechanism for the development of multiple features in man (e.g high capacity for rationality) and, according to historians of science, postulated that "higher intelligences guiding man's development were required."Shortly afterwards, Wallace became a spiritualist. At about the same time, he began to maintain that natural selection could not account for mathematical, artistic, or musical genius, metaphysical musings, or wit and humour. He stated that something in "the unseen universe of Spirit" had interceded at least three times in history: the creation of life from inorganic matter; the introduction of consciousness in the higher animals; and the generation of the higher mental faculties in humankind. He believed that the raison d'être of the universe was the development of the human spirit.

While some historians have concluded that Wallace's belief that natural selection was insufficient to explain the development of consciousness and the higher functions of the human mind was directly caused by his adoption of spiritualism, other scholars have disagreed, and some maintain that Wallace never believed natural selection applied to those areas. Reaction to Wallace's ideas on this topic among leading naturalists at the time varied. Lyell endorsed Wallace's views on human evolution rather than Darwin's. Wallace's belief that human consciousness could not be entirely a product of purely material causes was shared by a number of prominent intellectuals in the late 19th and early 20th centuries. All the same, many, including Huxley, Hooker, and Darwin himself, were critical of Wallace's views.

As the historian of science and sceptic Michael Shermer has stated, Wallace's views in this area were at odds with two major tenets of the emerging Darwinian philosophy. These were that evolution was not teleological (purpose-driven), and that it was not anthropocentric (human-centred). Much later in his life Wallace returned to these themes, that evolution suggested that the universe might have a purpose, and that certain aspects of living organisms might not be explainable in terms of purely materialistic processes. He set out his ideas in a 1909 magazine article entitled The World of Life. In 1910, Wallace published his final views on evolution, natural selection, and design in The World of Life: A Manifestation of Creative Power, Directive Mind and Ultimate Purpose where he discussed among other things, the distribution of species, the evolution of life, the geological record, the emergence of research into living cells and microbiology, elements and water in relation to life, pain among living creatures. Wallace anticipated ideas about design in nature and directed evolution that would arise from religious traditions throughout the 20th century.

=== Wallace in the history of evolutionary theory ===
In many accounts of the development of evolutionary theory, Wallace is mentioned only in passing as simply being the stimulus to the publication of Darwin's own theory. In reality, Wallace developed his own distinct evolutionary views which diverged from Darwin's, and was considered by many (especially Darwin) to be a leading thinker on evolution in his day, whose ideas could not be ignored. One historian of science has pointed out that, through both private correspondence and published works, Darwin and Wallace exchanged knowledge and stimulated each other's ideas and theories over an extended period. Wallace is the most-cited naturalist in Darwin's Descent of Man, occasionally in strong disagreement. Darwin and Wallace agreed on the importance of natural selection, and some of the factors responsible for it: competition between species and geographical isolation. But Wallace believed that evolution had a purpose ("teleology") in maintaining species' fitness to their environment, whereas Darwin hesitated to attribute any purpose to a random natural process. Scientific discoveries since the 19th century support Darwin's viewpoint, by identifying additional mechanisms and triggers such as mutations triggered by environmental radiation or mutagenic chemicals. Wallace remained an ardent defender of natural selection for the rest of his life. By the 1880s, evolution was widely accepted in scientific circles, but natural selection less so. Wallace's 1889 Darwinism was a response to the scientific critics of natural selection. Of all Wallace's books, it is the most cited by scholarly publications.

== Other scientific contributions ==
=== Biogeography and ecology ===
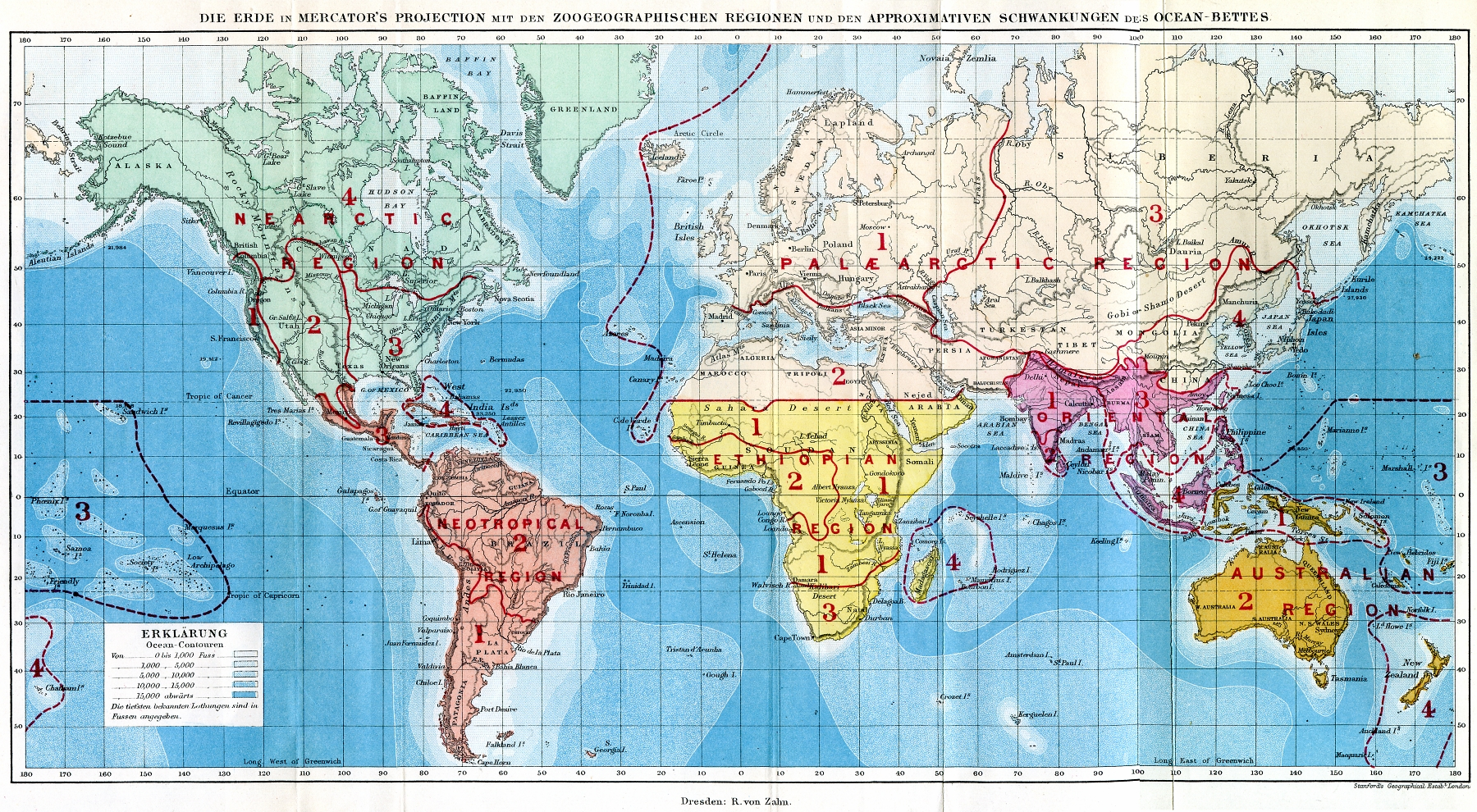
A map of the world from The Geographical Distribution of Animals shows Wallace's six biogeographical regions.

In 1872, at the urging of many of his friends, including Darwin, Philip Sclater, and Alfred Newton, Wallace began research for a general review of the geographic distribution of animals. Initial progress was slow, in part because classification systems for many types of animals were in flux. He resumed the work in earnest in 1874 after the publication of a number of new works on classification. Extending the system developed by Sclater for birds—which divided the earth into six separate geographic regions for describing species distribution—to cover mammals, reptiles and insects as well, Wallace created the basis for the zoogeographic regions in use today. He discussed the factors then known to influence the current and past geographic distribution of animals within each geographic region.

These factors included the effects of the appearance and disappearance of land bridges (such as the one currently connecting North America and South America) and the effects of periods of increased glaciation. When the Isthmus of Panama formed, species crossed it in both directions in the Great American Interchange. He provided maps showing factors, such as elevation of mountains, depths of oceans, and the character of regional vegetation, that affected the distribution of animals. He summarised all the known families and genera of the higher animals and listed their known geographic distributions. The text was organised so that it would be easy for a traveller to learn what animals could be found in a particular location. The resulting two-volume work, The Geographical Distribution of Animals, was published in 1876 and served as the definitive text on zoogeography for the next 80 years.

The book included evidence from the fossil record to discuss the processes of evolution and migration that had led to the geographical distribution of modern species. For example, he discussed how fossil evidence showed that tapirs had originated in the Northern Hemisphere, migrating between North America and Eurasia and then, much more recently, to South America after which the northern species became extinct, leaving the modern distribution of two isolated groups of tapir species in South America and Southeast Asia. Wallace was very aware of, and interested in, the mass extinction of megafauna in the late Pleistocene. In The Geographical Distribution of Animals (1876) he wrote, "We live in a zoologically impoverished world, from which all the hugest, and fiercest, and strangest forms have recently disappeared". He added that he believed the most likely cause for the rapid extinctions was glaciation, but by the time he wrote World of Life (1911) he had come to believe those extinctions were "due to man's agency".

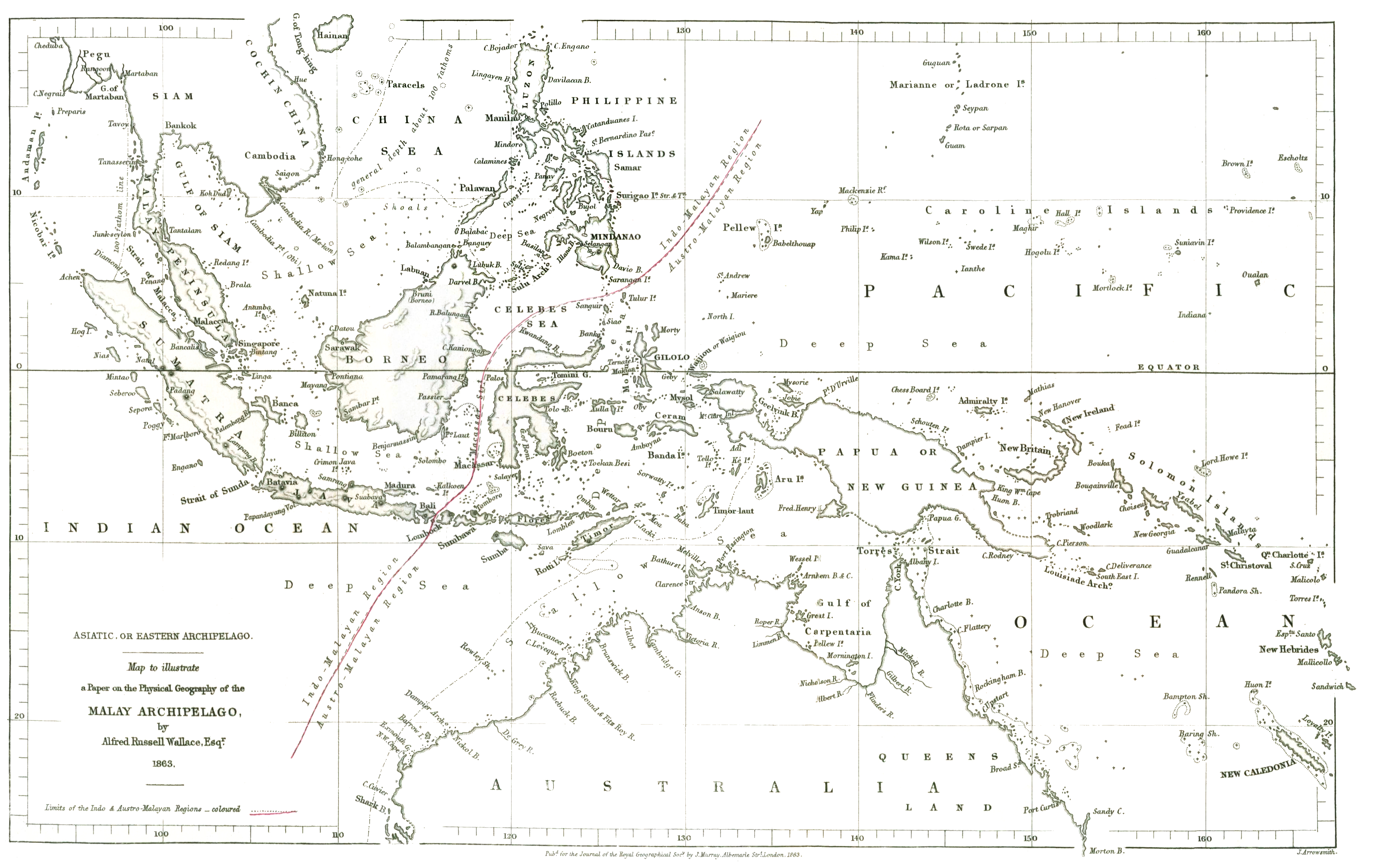
The line separating the Indo-Malayan and the Austro-Malayan region in Wallace's On the Physical Geography of the Malay Archipelago (1863)

In 1880, Wallace published the book Island Life as a sequel to The Geographical Distribution of Animals. It surveyed the distribution of both animal and plant species on islands. Wallace classified islands into oceanic and two types of continental islands. Oceanic islands, in his view, such as the Galápagos and Hawaiian Islands (then called Sandwich Islands) formed in mid-ocean and never part of any large continent. Such islands were characterised by a complete lack of terrestrial mammals and amphibians, and their inhabitants (except migratory birds and species introduced by humans) were typically the result of accidental colonisation and subsequent evolution. Continental islands, in his scheme, were divided into those that were recently separated from a continent (like Britain) and those much less recently (like Madagascar). Wallace discussed how that difference affected flora and fauna. He discussed how isolation affected evolution and how that could result in the preservation of classes of animals, such as the lemurs of Madagascar that were remnants of once widespread continental faunas. He extensively discussed how changes of climate, particularly periods of increased glaciation, may have affected the distribution of flora and fauna on some islands, and the first portion of the book discusses possible causes of these great ice ages. Island Life was considered a very important work at the time of its publication. It was discussed extensively in scientific circles both in published reviews and in private correspondence.

=== Environmentalism ===
Wallace's extensive work in biogeography made him aware of the impact of human activities on the natural world. He was also impressed by George Perkins Marsh's influential book Man and Nature. In Tropical Nature and Other Essays (1878), citing Marsh, he warned about the dangers of deforestation and soil erosion, especially in tropical climates prone to heavy rainfall. Noting the complex interactions between vegetation and climate, he warned that the extensive clearing of rainforest for coffee cultivation in Ceylon (now called Sri Lanka) and India would adversely impact the climate in those countries and lead to their impoverishment due to soil erosion. In Island Life, Wallace again mentioned deforestation and invasive species. On the impact of European colonisation on the island of Saint Helena, he wrote that the island was "now so barren and forbidding that some persons find it difficult to believe that it was once all green and fertile". He explained that the soil was protected by the island's vegetation; once that was destroyed, the soil was washed off the steep slopes by heavy tropical rain, leaving "bare rock or sterile clay". He attributed the "irreparable destruction" to feral goats, introduced in 1513. The island's forests were further damaged by the "reckless waste" of the East India Company from 1651, which used the bark of valuable redwood and ebony trees for tanning, leaving the wood to rot unused. Wallace's comments on environment grew more urgent later in his career. In The World of Life (1911) he wrote that people should view nature "as invested with a certain sanctity, to be used by us but not abused, and never to be recklessly destroyed or defaced."

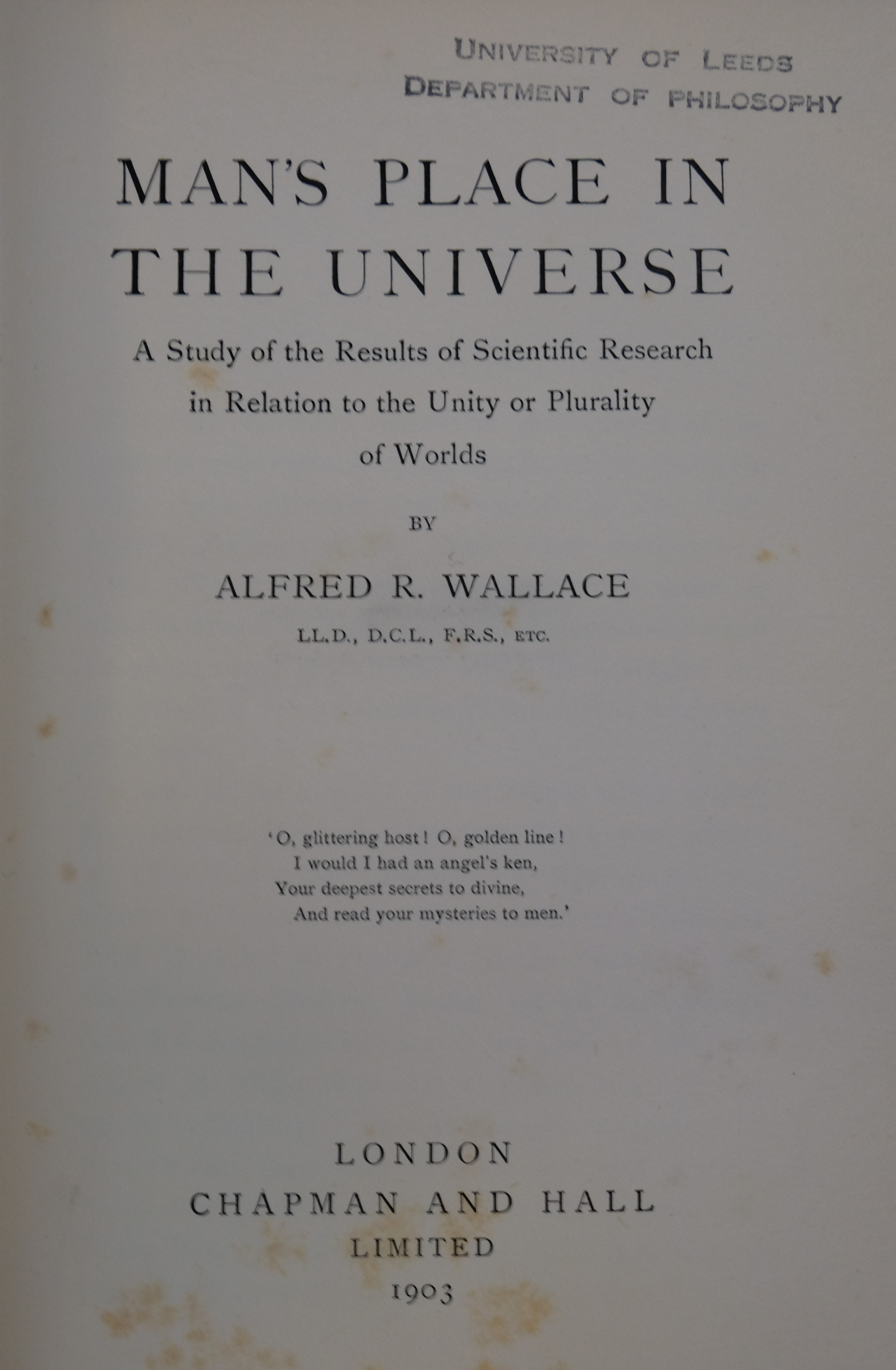
Title page to Man's Place in the Universe (1903)

=== Astrobiology ===
Wallace's 1904 book Man's Place in the Universe was the first serious attempt by a biologist to evaluate the likelihood of life on other planets. He concluded that the Earth was the only planet in the Solar System that could possibly support life, mainly because it was the only one in which water could exist in the liquid phase. His treatment of Mars in this book was brief, and in 1907, Wallace returned to the subject with the book Is Mars Habitable? to criticise the claims made by the American astronomer Percival Lowell that there were Martian canals built by intelligent beings. Wallace did months of research, consulted various experts, and produced his own scientific analysis of the Martian climate and atmospheric conditions. He pointed out that spectroscopic analysis had shown no signs of water vapour in the Martian atmosphere, that Lowell's analysis of Mars's climate badly overestimated the surface temperature, and that low atmospheric pressure would make liquid water, let alone a planet-girding irrigation system, impossible. Richard Milner comments that Wallace "effectively debunked Lowell's illusionary network of Martian canals." Wallace became interested in the topic because his anthropocentric philosophy inclined him to believe that man would be unique in the universe.

== Other activities ==
=== Spiritualism ===
Wallace was an enthusiast of phrenology. Early in his career, he experimented with hypnosis, then known as mesmerism, managing to hypnotise some of his students in Leicester. When he began these experiments, the topic was very controversial: early experimenters, such as John Elliotson, had been harshly criticised by the medical and scientific establishment. Wallace drew a connection between his experiences with mesmerism and spiritualism, arguing that one should not deny observations on "a priori grounds of absurdity or impossibility".

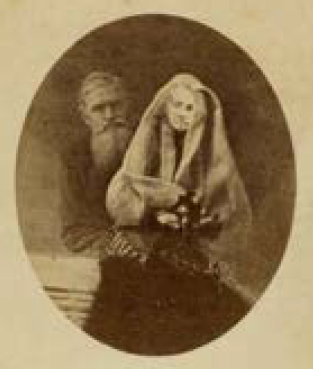
Spirit photograph taken by Frederick Hudson of Wallace and his late mother in 1882; he may have used double exposure.

Wallace began investigating spiritualism in the summer of 1865, possibly at the urging of his older sister Fanny Sims. After reviewing the literature and attempting to test what he witnessed at séances, he came to believe in it. For the rest of his life, he remained convinced that at least some séance phenomena were genuine, despite accusations of fraud and evidence of trickery. One biographer suggested that the emotional shock when his first fiancée broke their engagement contributed to his receptiveness to spiritualism. Other scholars have emphasised his desire to find scientific explanations for all phenomena. In 1874, Wallace visited the spirit photographer Frederick Hudson. He declared that a photograph of him with his deceased mother was genuine. Others reached a different conclusion: Hudson's photographs had previously been exposed as fraudulent in 1872.

Wallace's public advocacy of spiritualism and his repeated defence of spiritualist mediums against allegations of fraud in the 1870s damaged his scientific reputation. In 1875 he published the evidence he believed proved his position in On Miracles and Modern Spiritualism. His attitude permanently strained his relationships with previously friendly scientists such as Henry Bates, Thomas Huxley, and even Darwin. Others, such as the physiologist William Benjamin Carpenter and zoologist E. Ray Lankester became publicly hostile to Wallace over the issue. Wallace was heavily criticised by the press; The Lancet was particularly harsh. When, in 1879, Darwin first tried to rally support among naturalists to get a civil pension awarded to Wallace, Joseph Hooker responded that "Wallace has lost caste considerably, not only by his adhesion to Spiritualism, but by the fact of his having deliberately and against the whole voice of the committee of his section of the British Association, brought about a discussion on Spiritualism at one of its sectional meetings ... This he is said to have done in an underhanded manner, and I well remember the indignation it gave rise to in the B.A. Council." Hooker eventually relented and agreed to support the pension request.

=== Flat Earth wager ===
In 1870, a flat-Earth proponent named John Hampden offered a £500 wager (roughly equivalent to £51,000 in 2025) in a magazine advertisement to anyone who could demonstrate a convex curvature in a body of water such as a river, canal, or lake. Wallace, intrigued by the challenge and short of money at the time, designed an experiment in which he set up two objects along a six-mile (10 km) stretch of canal. Both objects were at the same height above the water, and he mounted a telescope on a bridge at the same height above the water as well. When seen through the telescope, one object appeared higher than the other, showing the curvature of the Earth. The judge for the wager, the editor of Field magazine, declared Wallace the winner, but Hampden refused to accept the result. He sued Wallace and launched a campaign, which persisted for several years, of writing letters to various publications and to organisations of which Wallace was a member denouncing him as a swindler and a thief. Wallace won multiple libel suits against Hampden, but the resulting litigation cost Wallace more than the amount of the wager, and the controversy frustrated him for years.

=== Anti-vaccination campaign ===
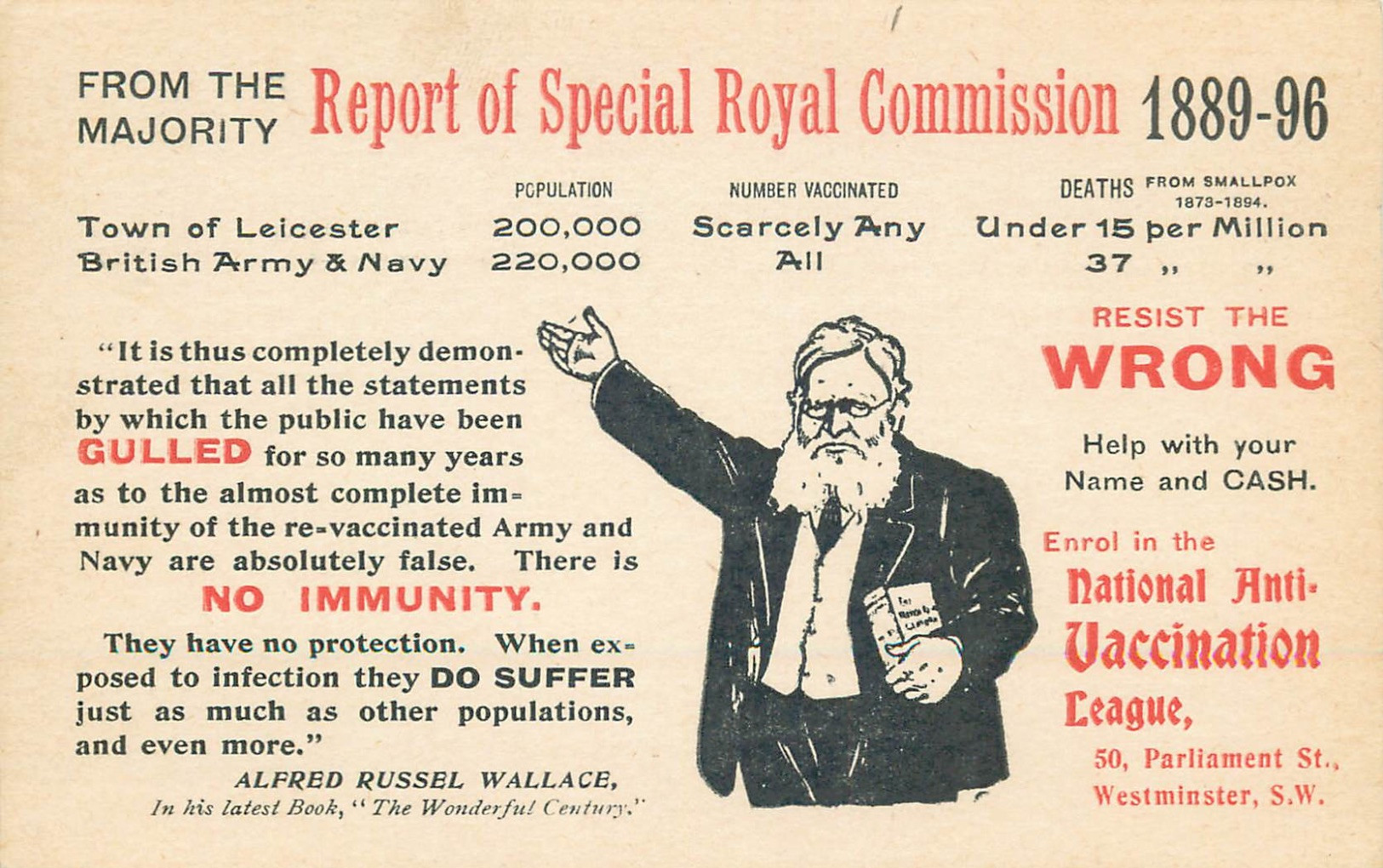
Alfred Russel Wallace 1898 National Anti-Vaccination League postcard

In the early 1880s, Wallace joined the debate over mandatory smallpox vaccination. Wallace originally saw the issue as a matter of personal liberty; but, after studying statistics provided by anti-vaccination activists, he began to question the efficacy of vaccination. At the time, the germ theory of disease was new and far from universally accepted. Moreover, no one knew enough about the human immune system to understand why vaccination worked. Wallace discovered instances where supporters of vaccination had used questionable, in a few cases completely false, statistics to support their arguments. Always suspicious of authority, Wallace suspected that physicians had a vested interest in promoting vaccination, and became convinced that reductions in the incidence of smallpox that had been attributed to vaccination were due to better hygiene and improvements in public sanitation.

Another factor in Wallace's thinking was his belief that, because of the action of natural selection, organisms were in a state of balance with their environment, and that everything in nature, served a useful purpose. Wallace pointed out that vaccination, which at the time was often unsanitary, could be dangerous.

In 1890, Wallace gave evidence to a royal commission investigating the controversy. It found errors in his testimony, including some questionable statistics. The Lancet averred that Wallace and other activists were being selective in their choice of statistics. The commission found that smallpox vaccination was effective and should remain compulsory, though they recommended some changes in procedures to improve safety, and that the penalties for people who refused to comply be made less severe. Years later, in 1898, Wallace wrote a pamphlet, Vaccination a Delusion; Its Penal Enforcement a Crime, attacking the commission's findings. It, in turn, was attacked by The Lancet, which stated that it repeated many of the same errors as his evidence given to the commission.

== Legacy and historical perception ==
=== Honours ===
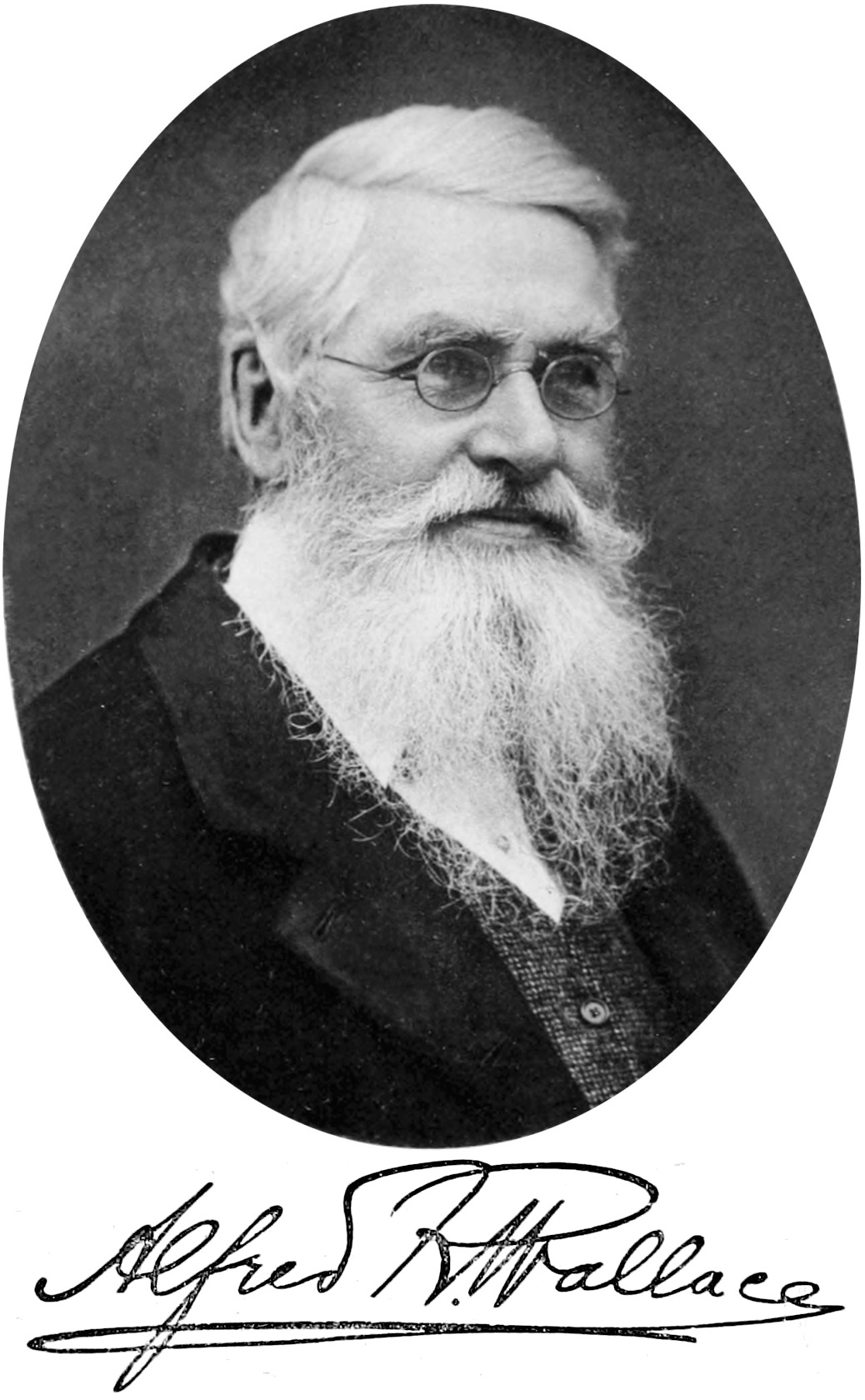
Wallace and his signature on the frontispiece of Darwinism (1889)

As a result of his writing, Wallace became a well-known figure both as a scientist and as a social activist, and was often sought out for his views. He became president of the anthropology section of the British Association in 1866, and of the Entomological Society of London in 1870. He was elected to the American Philosophical Society in 1873. The British Association elected him as head of its biology section in 1876. He was elected to the Royal Society in 1893. He was asked to chair the International Congress of Spiritualists meeting in London in 1898. He received honorary doctorates and professional honours, such the Royal Society's Royal Medal in 1868 and its Darwin Medal in 1890, and the Order of Merit in 1908.

=== Obscurity and rehabilitation ===
Wallace's fame faded quickly after his death. For a long time, he was treated as a relatively obscure figure in the history of science. Reasons for this lack of attention may have included his modesty, his willingness to champion unpopular causes without regard for his own reputation, and the discomfort of much of the scientific community with some of his unconventional ideas. The reason that the theory of evolution is popularly credited to Darwin is likely the impact of Darwin's On the Origin of Species.

Recently, Wallace has become better known, with the publication of at least five book-length biographies and two anthologies of his writings published since 2000. A web page dedicated to Wallace scholarship is maintained at Western Kentucky University. In a 2010 book, the environmentalist Tim Flannery argued that Wallace was "the first modern scientist to comprehend how essential cooperation is to our survival", and suggested that Wallace's understanding of natural selection and his later work on the atmosphere should be seen as a forerunner to modern ecological thinking. A collection of his medals, including the Order of Merit, were sold at auction for £273,000 in 2022.

=== Centenary celebrations ===
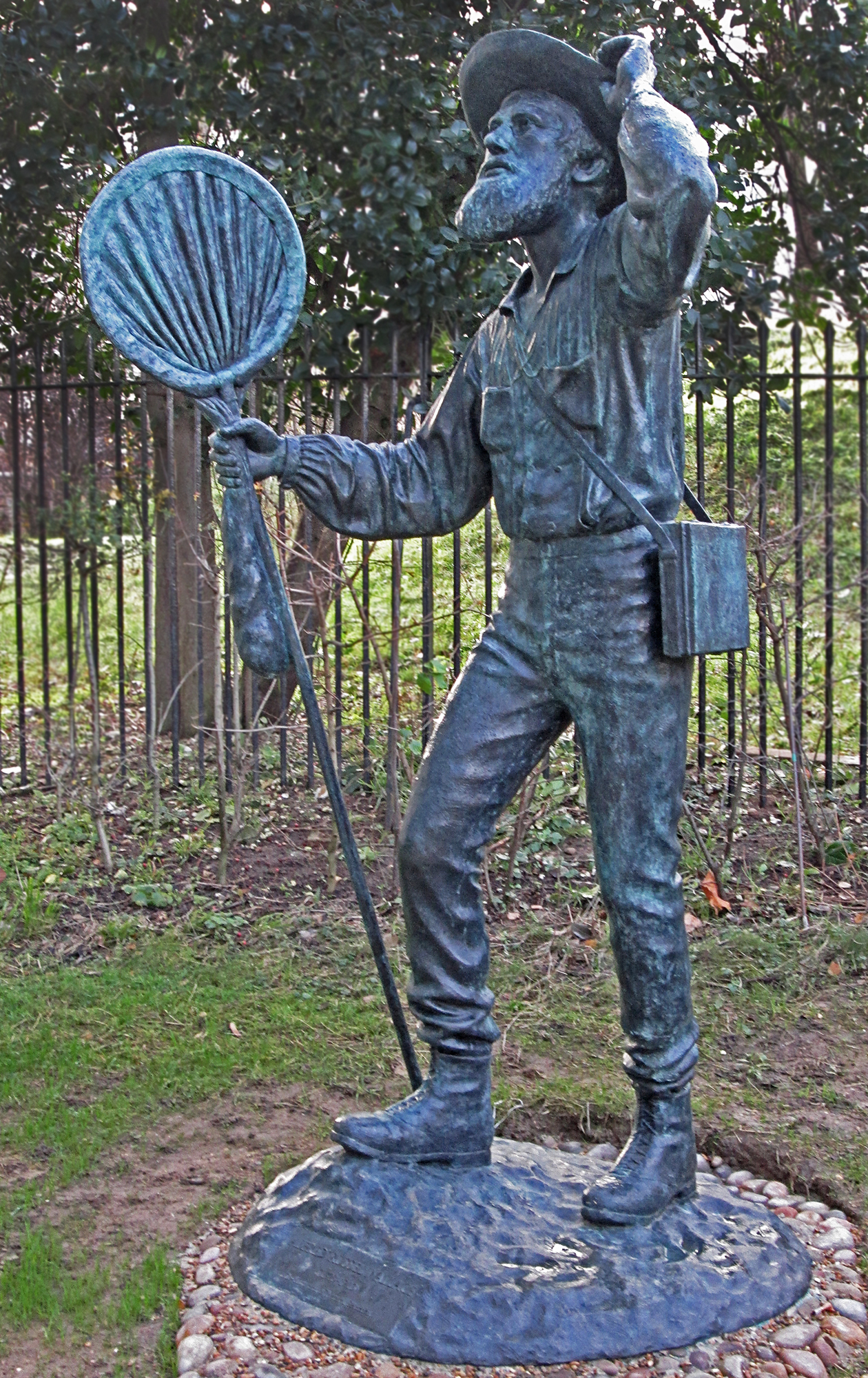
Anthony Smith's statue of Wallace, looking up at a bronze model of a Wallace's golden birdwing butterfly. Natural History Museum, London, unveiled 7 November 2013.

The Natural History Museum, London, co-ordinated commemorative events for the Wallace centenary worldwide in the 'Wallace100' project in 2013. On 24 January, his portrait was unveiled in the Main Hall of the museum by Bill Bailey, a fervent admirer. Bailey further championed Wallace in his 2013 BBC Two series "Bill Bailey's Jungle Hero". On 7 November 2013, the 100th anniversary of Wallace's death, Sir David Attenborough unveiled a statue of Wallace at the museum. The statue, sculpted by Anthony Smith, was donated by the A. R. Wallace Memorial Fund. It depicts Wallace as a young man, collecting in the jungle. November 2013 marked the debut of The Animated Life of A. R. Wallace, a paper-puppet animation film dedicated to Wallace's centennial. In addition, Bailey unveiled a bust of Wallace, sculpted by Felicity Crawley, in Twyn Square in Usk, Monmouthshire in November 2021.

=== Bicentenary celebrations ===
Commemorations of the 200th anniversary of Wallace's birth celebrated during the course of 2023 range from naturalist walk events to scientific congresses and presentations. A Harvard Museum of Natural History event in April 2023 will also include a mixologist-designed special cocktail to honor Wallace's legacy.

=== Memorials ===
Mount Wallace in California's Sierra Nevada mountain range was named in his honour in 1895. In 1928, a house at Richard Hale School (then called Hertford Grammar School, where he had been a pupil) was named after Wallace. The Alfred Russel Wallace building is a prominent feature of the Glyntaff campus at the University of South Wales, by Pontypridd, with several teaching spaces and laboratories for science courses. The Natural Sciences Building at Swansea University and lecture theatre at Cardiff University are named after him, as are impact craters on Mars and the Moon. In 1986, the Royal Entomological Society mounted a year-long expedition to the Dumoga-Bone National Park in North Sulawesi named Project Wallace. A group of Indonesian islands is known as the Wallacea biogeographical region in his honour, and Operation Wallacea, named after the region, awards "Alfred Russel Wallace Grants" to undergraduate ecology students. Several hundred species of plants and animals, both living and fossil, have been named after Wallace, such as the gecko Cyrtodactylus wallacei, and the freshwater stingray Potamotrygon wallacei. More recently, several new species have been named during the bicentenary year of Wallace's birth, including a large spider from Peru, Linothele wallacei Sherwood et al., 2023 and a South African weevil, Nama wallacei Meregalli & Borovec, 2023.

== Writings ==
Wallace was a prolific author. In 2002, historian of science Michael Shermer published a quantitative analysis of Wallace's publications. He found that Wallace had published 22 full-length books and at least 747 shorter pieces, 508 of which were scientific papers (191 of them published in Nature). He further broke down the 747 short pieces by their primary subjects: 29% were on biogeography and natural history, 27% were on evolutionary theory, 25% were social commentary, 12% were on anthropology, and 7% were on spiritualism and phrenology. An online bibliography of Wallace's writings has more than 750 entries.

The standard author abbreviation Wallace is used to indicate this person as the author when citing a botanical name.
