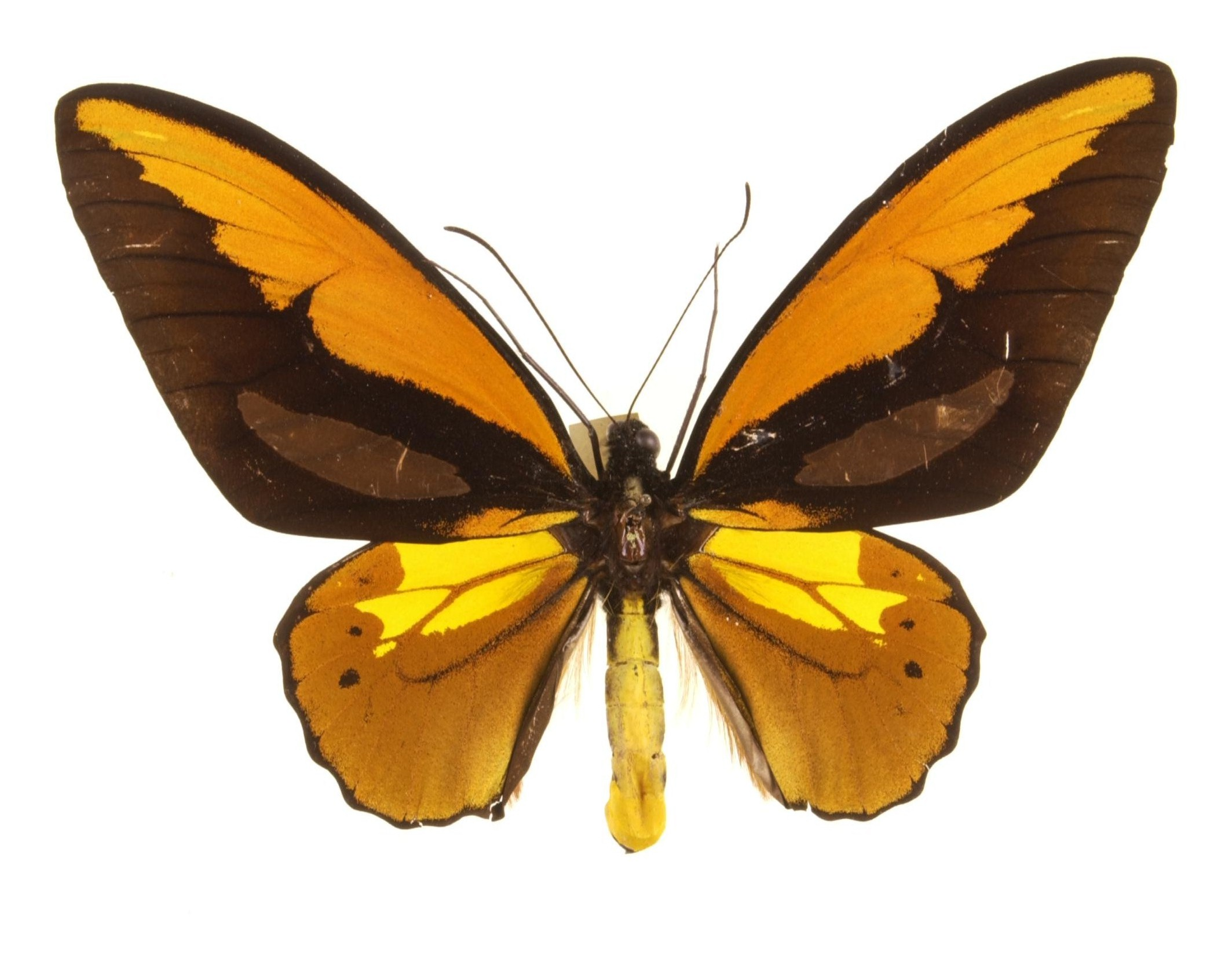
- Male

Conservation status
- Near Threatened (IUCN 3.1)
- CITES Appendix II (CITES)

Scientific classification
- Kingdom: Animalia
- Phylum: Arthropoda
- Class: Insecta
- Order: Lepidoptera
- Family: Papilionidae
- Genus: Ornithoptera
- Species: O. croesus

Binomial name
- Ornithoptera croesus Wallace, 1859

= Ornithoptera croesus =

Wallace's golden birdwing

Species of birdwing butterfly

Ornithoptera croesus, the Wallace's golden birdwing, is a species of birdwing butterfly found in northern Maluku in Indonesia.

It is a member of the Ornithoptera priamus species group which, including croesus, is only found east of the Wallace Line. The larval food plants are species of the genus Pararistolochia. Matsuka (2001) illustrates the early stages (from N. Maluku; see also Igarashi, 1979).

== History ==
The "Wallace" in the common name, Wallace's golden birdwing, refers to Alfred Russel Wallace who described the species in 1859. Wallace recounts his capture of the butterfly in his book The Malay Archipelago (1869): "The beauty and brilliancy of this insect are indescribable, and none but a naturalist can understand the intense excitement I experienced when I at length captured it. On taking it out of my net and opening the glorious wings, my heart began to beat violently, the blood rushed to my head, and I felt much more like fainting than I have done when in apprehension of immediate death. I had a headache the rest of the day, so great was the excitement produced by what will appear to most people a very inadequate cause."

The specific epithet of Ornithoptera croesus, is named after Croesus, the king of Lydia from 560 to 547 BC.

== Description ==
Male: The upperside wings are black and have a yellow costal band. There is a clearly visible long oval sex brand (of androconial scales) in the black area. The underside is black marked with lines of green chevrons. The upperside hindwings are yellow and the underside is green, yellow towards the costa. The veins are black and there is a submarginal row of black spots. The head and thorax are brown and the abdomen is yellow.

Female: typical of birdwing butterflies, Ornithoptera croesus is strongly sexually dimorphic. Females are larger than males and have brown wings marked with lines of yellow chevrons.

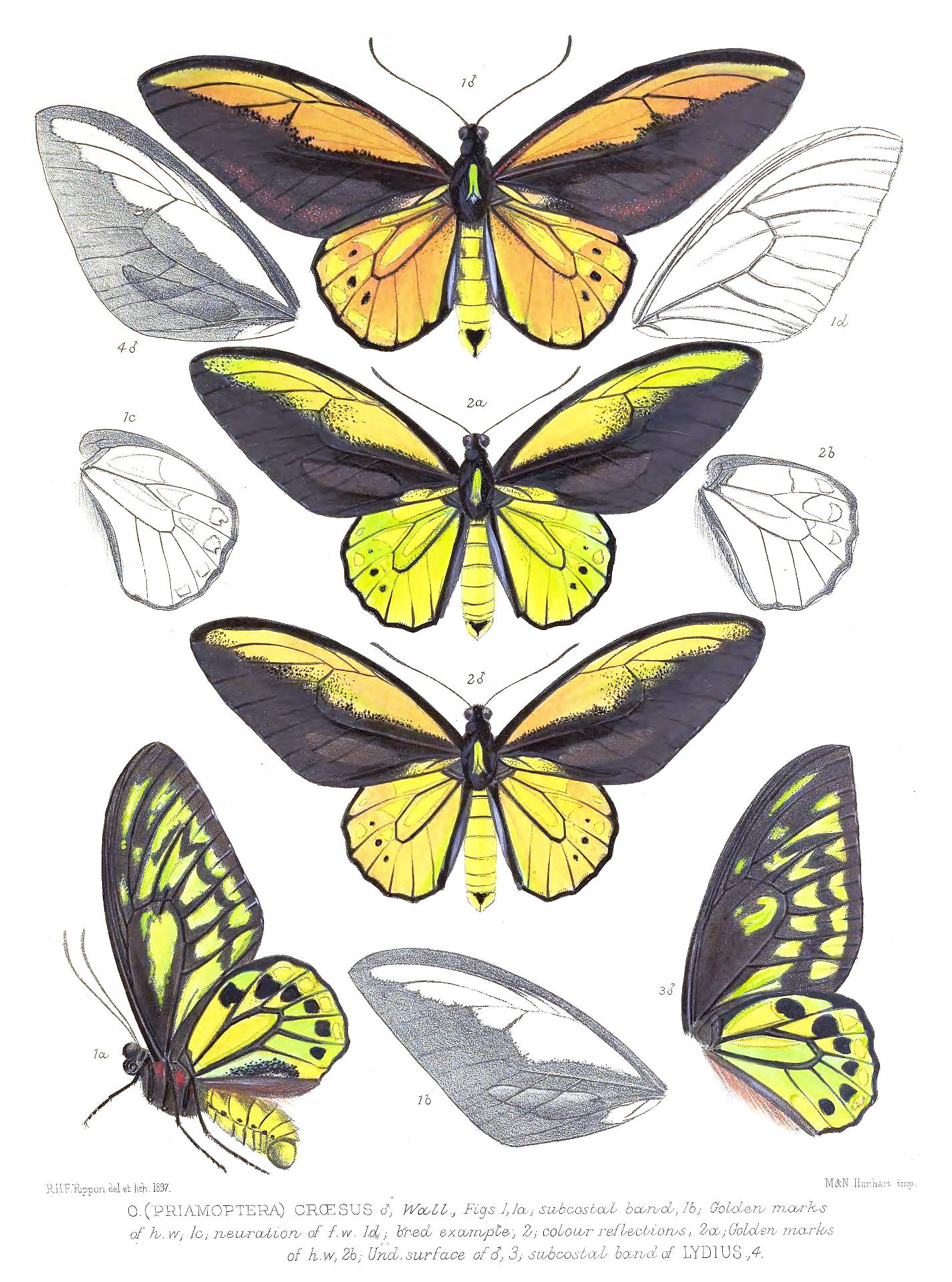

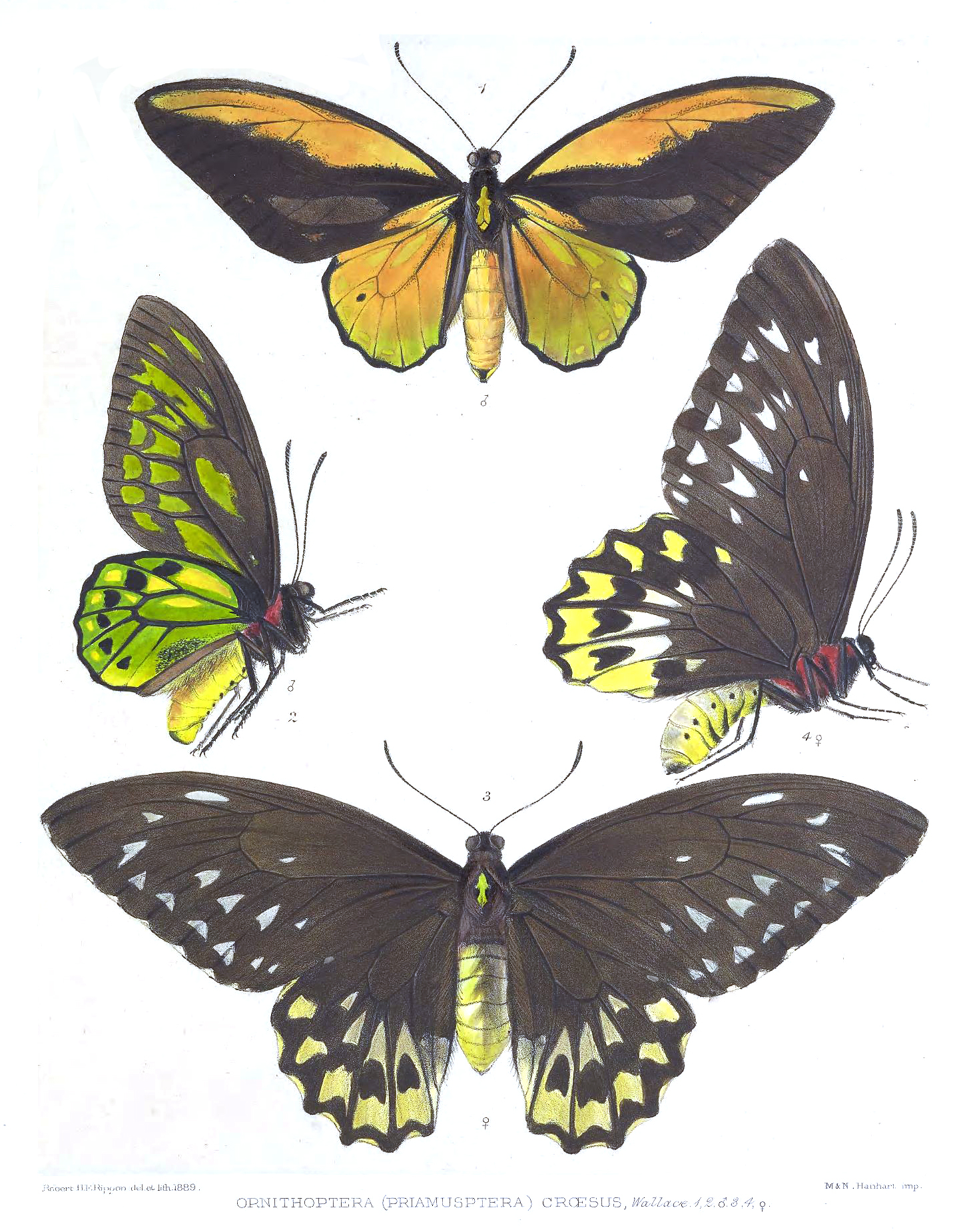

== Subspecies ==
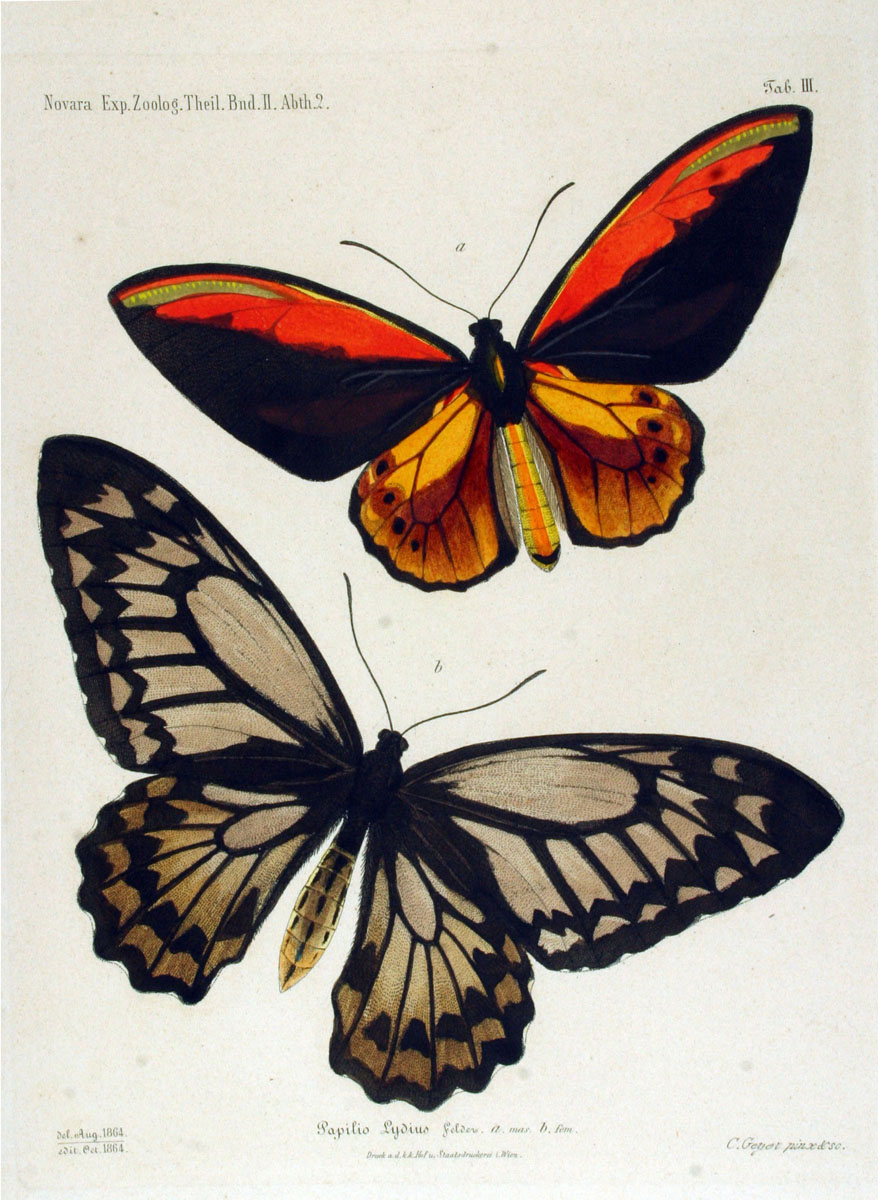
Male (above) and female. Plate from Reise Fregatte Novara. Zoologischer by Rudolf Felder and Alois Rogenhofer

- Ornithoptera croesus croesus
- Ornithoptera croesus helios Kobayashi & Hayami, 1992 Kasiruta Island
- Ornithoptera croesus lydius (Felder & Felder, 1865) Halmahera Island, Ternate Island, Tidore Island, Doi Island
- Ornithoptera croesus sananaensis Tsukada & Nishiyama, 1980 Bacan Island
- Ornithoptera croesus toeantei Parrot & Schmid, 1984 Morotai Island
- Ornithoptera croesus wallaci Deslisle, 1993 Mandioli Island

== Conservation ==
Ornithoptera croesus was formerly considered vulnerable by the IUCN, but its status was changed to Near Threatened in 2018. It is also listed in the Appendix II of CITES, restricting international trade to captive-raised specimens only.

== Other sources ==
- D'Abrera, B. (1975) Birdwing Butterflies of the World. Country Life Books, London.
- Deslisle, G. (2004) A taxonomic revision of the "birdwing butterflies of paradise", genus Ornithoptera based on the adult morphology (Lepidoptera, Papilionidae). Lambillionea, 104 (4): 1 - 151.
- Haugum, J. & Low, A.M. 1978-1985. A Monograph of the Birdwing Butterflies. 2 volumes. Scandinavian Press, Klampenborg; 663 pp.
- Deslisle, G [Ornithoptera (Ornithoptera) croesus wallacei] Bulletin de la Société Sciences Nat 71, p. 5
