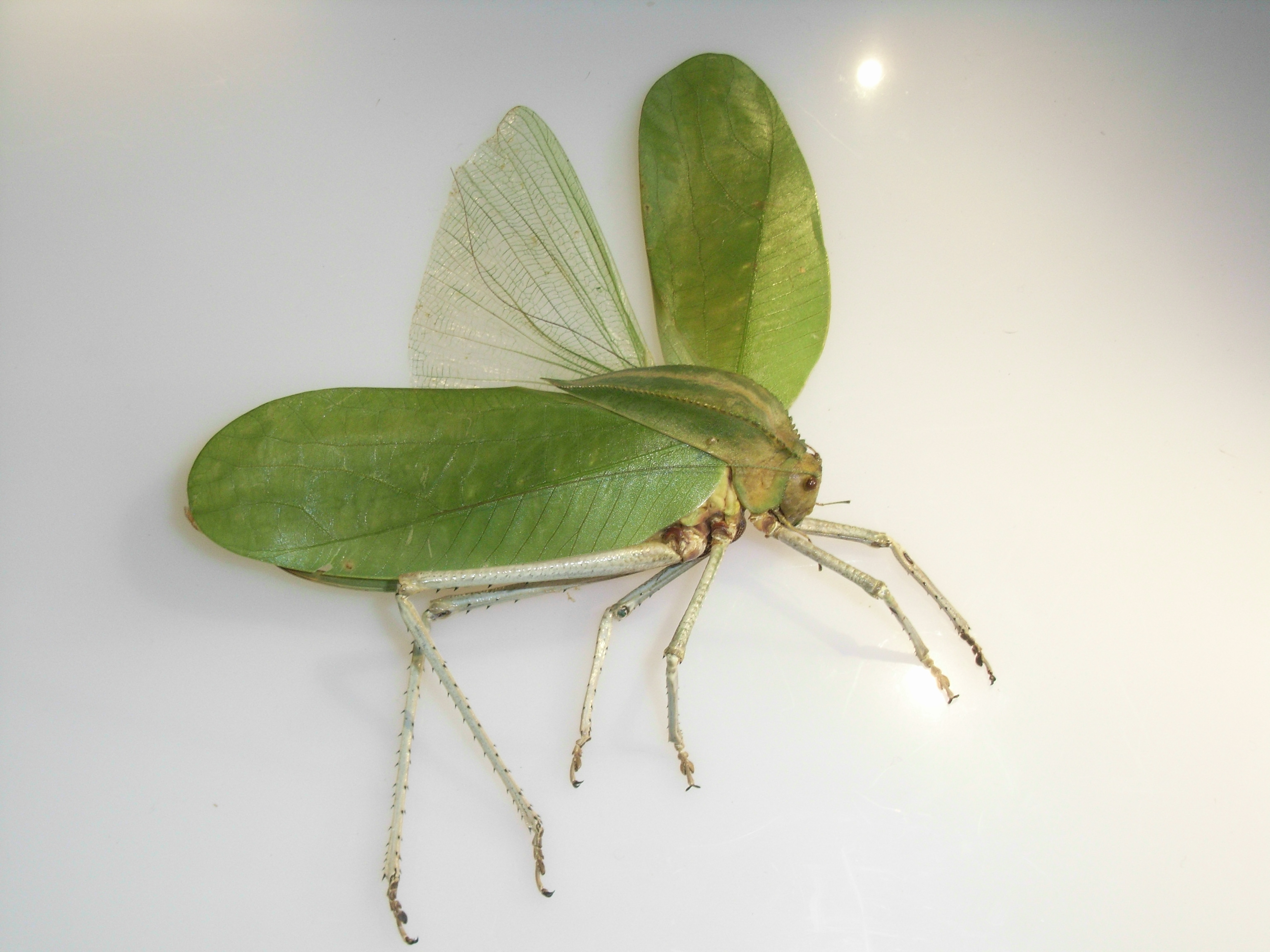
- Adult specimen with wings of the opposite side open

Scientific classification
- Kingdom: Animalia
- Phylum: Arthropoda
- Class: Insecta
- Order: Orthoptera
- Suborder: Ensifera
- Family: Tettigoniidae
- Subfamily: Phyllophorinae
- Genus: Siliquofera; Bolívar, 1903
- Species: S. grandis

Binomial name
- Siliquofera grandis (Blanchard, 1853)

Synonyms
- Megalodon ensifer Wallace, 1869; Eurygnathus giganteus Hesse & Doflein, 1914

= Siliquofera =

Subfamily of cricket-like animals

Siliquofera is a genus of bush cricket in the subfamily Phyllophorinae that includes only one species, Siliquofera grandis, which is fairly common and widespread in rainforest canopies of New Guinea and nearby smaller islands, and seemingly rare (possibly overlooked) in Australia where only found in the remote Iron Range region. This very well-camouflaged, green and leaf-like bush cricket is one of the world's largest Orthoptera (grasshopper, crickets and alike), with adults typically having a length of 10.7–13 cm (4.2–5.1 in) and a wingspan of 25–27 cm (9.8–10.6 in); it can weigh more than 30 g (1.1 oz).

English names include Hooded katydid and Giant katydid indicating its size and the shape of the pronotum, but both names are also used for other species. S. grandis was first scientifically described by Émile Blanchard in 1853, who placed it in the genus Phyllophora. The type locality was described as "Hollandia" (Jayapura) in Irian Jaya, with the type specimen placed in the National Museum of Natural History, France. The species was only moved to its own genus Siliquofera in 1903 by Ignacio Bolívar. Phyllophora and Siliquofera generally resemble each other, but the adults can easily be separate by the pronotum. In both, there are ridges with serrations along the pronotum's sides, but in Phyllophora there is also a spine on each side. This species has also been confused with Arachnacris (= Macrolyristes) corporalis in the Mecopodini.

== Behaviour ==
Females of S. grandis can reach a larger size than males. During her lifetime, a female can deposit up to 400 eggs in the soil with her ovipositor. Each egg measures about 14 mm (0.55 in) long and 3 mm (0.12 in) wide. They hatch into nymphs after a couple of months, which resemble the adults, but are smaller and wingless (giving them a more stubby appearance). A few months after hatching, they become adults. They may live for more than a year.

Both adults and nymphs feed exclusively on plants. Being relatively large and originating from tropical rainforests, they have specialised requirements, but have proven relatively easy to maintain in captivity, feeding primarily on leaves from a wide range of plants such as bramble, roses, oak, fig and dandelions, but also vegetables and fruits such as lettuce, apples, carrots and cucumbers.

=== Sound ===
As typical of the subfamily Phyllophorinae but unlike most other bush crickets, S. grandis have a stridulation apparatus in the coxosternum, not in the tegmen. S. grandis is able to produce a relatively loud sound with its stridulation apparatus and by rapidly vibrating its wings. It uses sounds and vibrations both for communicating with others of the same species and for scaring away potential predators (e.g., when it is caught).

== Gallery ==
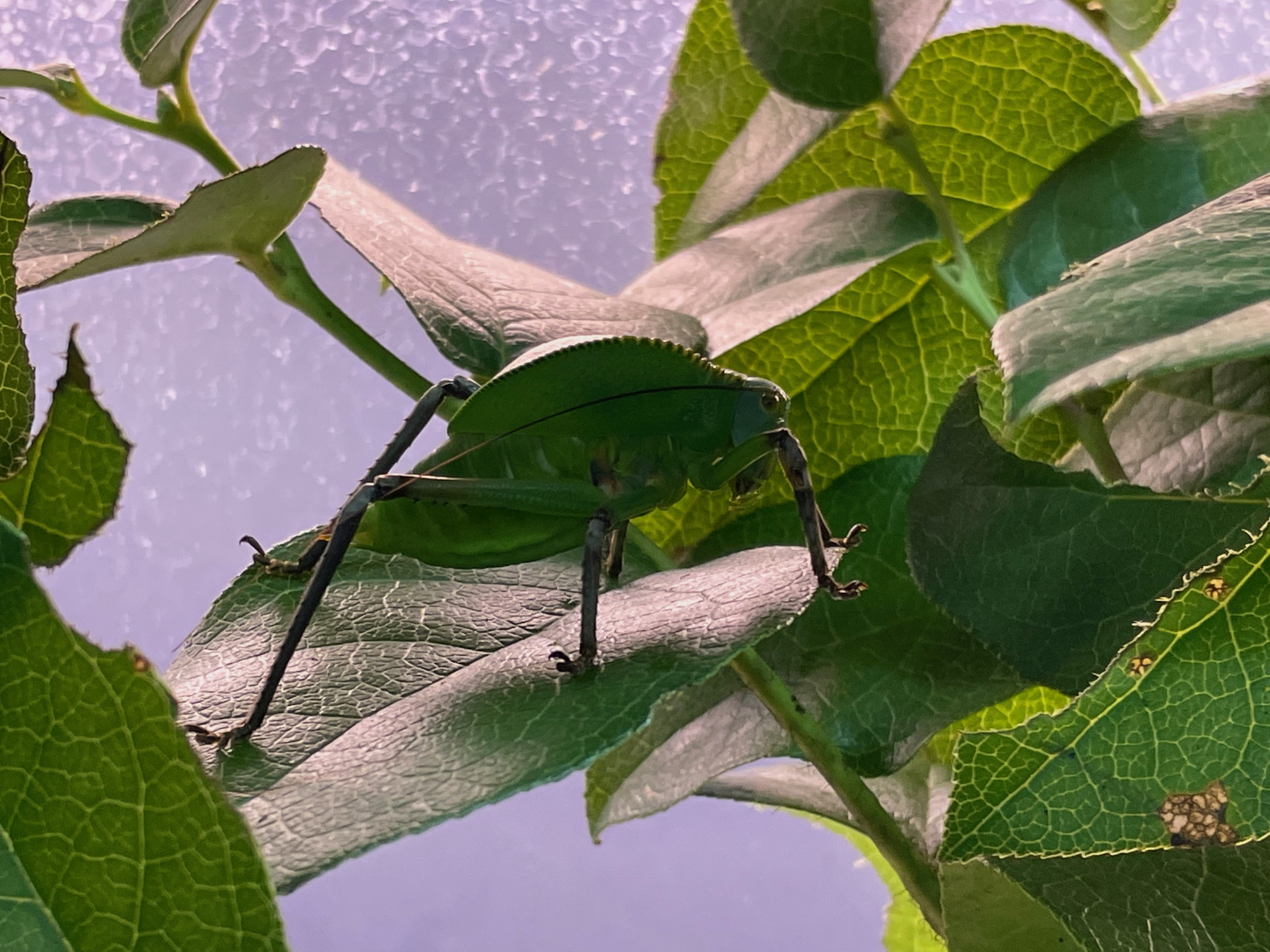
A nymph at the Entomica Insectarium, Canada

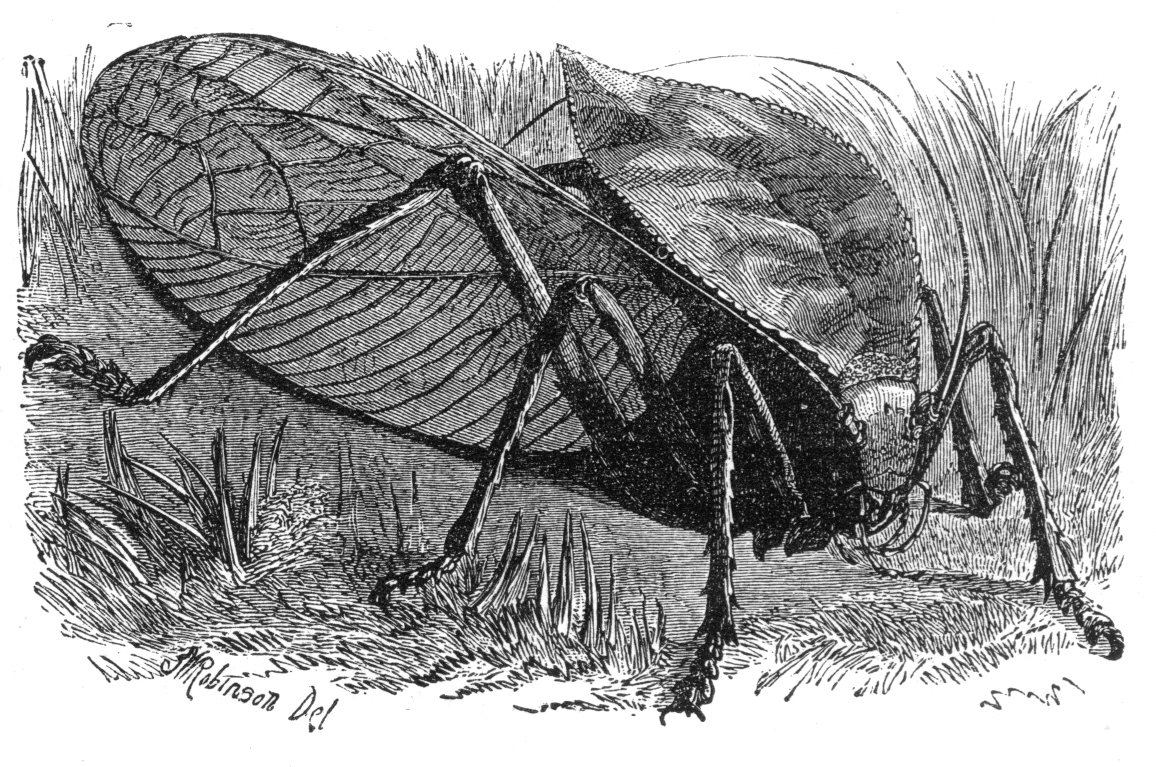
Illustration from Alfred Russel Wallace's The Malay Archipelago (1869)
