= The Malay Archipelago =

1869 natural history book by Alfred Russel Wallace

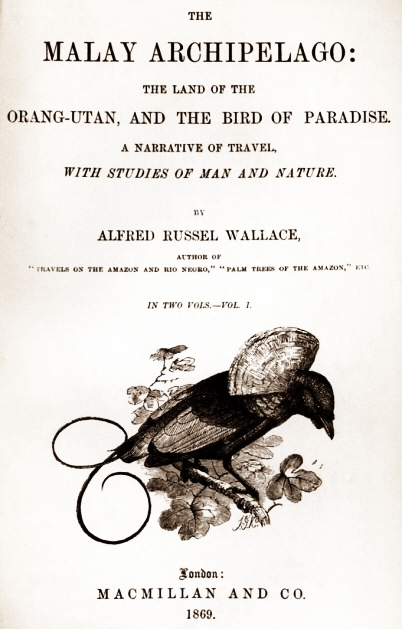
- Title page of first edition
- Author: Alfred Russel Wallace
- Original title: The Malay Archipelago: The land of the orang-utan, and the bird of paradise. A narrative of travel, with studies of man and nature
- Illustrator: Thomas Baines, Walter Hood Fitch, John Gerrard Keulemans, E. W. Robinson, Joseph Wolf, T. W. Wood
- Language: English
- Subject: Natural history, Travel
- Publisher: Macmillan
- Publication date: 1869
- Media type: 2 volumes

The Malay Archipelago is a book by the English naturalist Alfred Russel Wallace which chronicles his scientific exploration, during the eight-year period 1854 to 1862, of the southern portion of the Malay Archipelago including Malaysia, Singapore, the islands of Indonesia, then known as the Dutch East Indies, and the island of New Guinea. It was published in two volumes in 1869, delayed by Wallace's ill health and the work needed to describe the many specimens he brought home. The book went through ten editions in the nineteenth century; it has been reprinted many times since, and has been translated into at least twelve languages.

The book describes each island that he visited in turn, giving a detailed account of its physical and human geography, its volcanoes, and the variety of animals and plants that he found and collected. At the same time, he describes his experiences, the difficulties of travel, and the help he received from the different peoples that he met. The preface notes that he travelled over 14,000 miles and collected 125,660 natural history specimens, mostly of insects though also thousands of molluscs, birds, mammals and reptiles.

The work was illustrated with engravings, based on Wallace's observations and collection, by the leading illustrators Thomas Baines, Walter Hood Fitch, John Gerrard Keulemans, E. W. Robinson, Joseph Wolf and T. W. Wood.

The Malay Archipelago attracted many reviews, with interest from scientific, geographic, church and general periodicals. Reviewers noted and sometimes disagreed with various aspects of his theories, especially the division of fauna and flora along what soon became known as the Wallace line, natural selection and uniformitarianism. Nearly all agreed that he had provided an interesting and comprehensive account of the geography, natural history, and peoples of the archipelago, which little was known about to readers at the time, in addition to the extensive breadth of specimens collected. The book is much cited, and is Wallace's most successful, both commercially and as a piece of literature.

== Context ==
In 1847, Wallace and his friend Henry Walter Bates, both in their early twenties, (Note: Bates was 22, Wallace was 24.) agreed that they would jointly make a collecting trip to the Amazon "towards solving the problem of origin of species". (Charles Darwin's book on the Origin of Species was not published until 11 years later, in 1859. It was based on Darwin's own long collecting trip on HMS Beagle, its publication precipitated by a famous letter from Wallace, sent during the period covered by The Malay Archipelago while he was staying in Ternate, which described the theory of evolution by natural selection in outline.) Wallace and Bates had been inspired by reading the American entomologist William Henry Edwards's pioneering 1847 book A Voyage Up the River Amazon, with a residency at Pará. Bates stayed in the Amazons for 11 years, going on to write The Naturalist on the River Amazons (1863); however, Wallace, ill with fever, went home in 1852 with thousands of specimens, some for science and some for sale. The ship and his collection were destroyed by fire at sea near the Guianas. Rather than giving up, Wallace wrote about the Amazon in both prose and poetry, and then set sail again, this time for the Malay Archipelago.

== Overview ==
The preface summarises Wallace's travels, the thousands of specimens he collected, and some of the results from their analysis after his return to England. In the preface he notes that he travelled over 14,000 miles and collected 125,660 specimens, mostly of insects: 83,200 beetles, 13,100 butterflies and moths, 13,400 other insects. He also returned to England 7,500 "shells" (such as molluscs), 8,050 birds, 310 mammals and 100 reptiles. (Note: Wallace, 1869. p. xiv.)

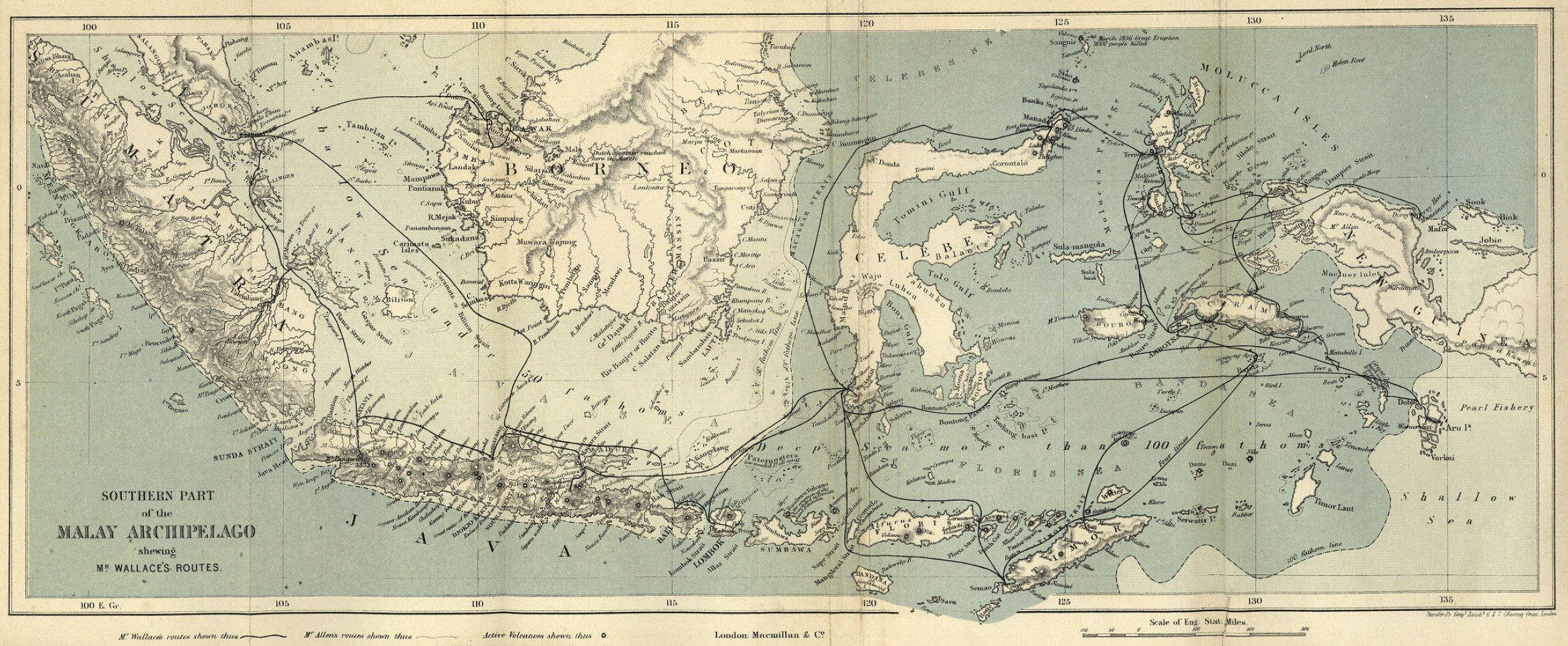
Fold-out coloured map at front of book, showing Wallace's travels around the archipelago. The deep water that separates Borneo from Sulawesi (Celebes) forms what became known as the Wallace line.

The book is dedicated to Charles Darwin, but as Wallace explains in the preface, he has chosen to avoid discussing the evolutionary implications of his discoveries. Instead he confines himself to the "interesting facts of the problem, whose solution is to be found in the principles developed by Mr. Darwin", (Note: Wallace, 1869. p. xii.) so from a scientific point of view, the book is largely a descriptive natural history. This modesty belies the fact that while in Sarawak in 1855 Wallace wrote the paper On the Law which has Regulated the Introduction of New Species, concluding with the evolutionary "Sarawak Law", "Every species has come into existence coincident both in space and time with a closely allied species", three years before he fatefully wrote to Darwin proposing the concept of natural selection.

The first chapter describes the physical geography and geology of the islands with particular attention to the role of volcanoes and earthquakes. It also discusses the overall pattern of the flora and fauna including the fact that the islands can be divided, by what would eventually become known as the Wallace line, into two parts, those whose animals are more closely related to those of Asia and those whose fauna is closer to that of Australia. (Note: Wallace, 1869. Volume 1, pp. 1–30.)

The following chapters describe in detail the places Wallace visited. Wallace includes numerous observations on the people, their languages, ways of living, and social organisation, as well as on the plants and animals found in each location. He talks about the biogeographic patterns he observes and their implications for natural history, in terms both of the movement of species (Note: Implying adaptive radiation.) and of the geologic history of the region. He also narrates some of his personal experiences during his travels. (Note: Wallace, 1869.) The final chapter is an overview of the ethnic, linguistic, and cultural divisions among the people who live in the region and speculation about what such divisions might indicate about their history. (Note: Wallace, 1869. Volume 2, pp. 439–464.)

== Publication ==
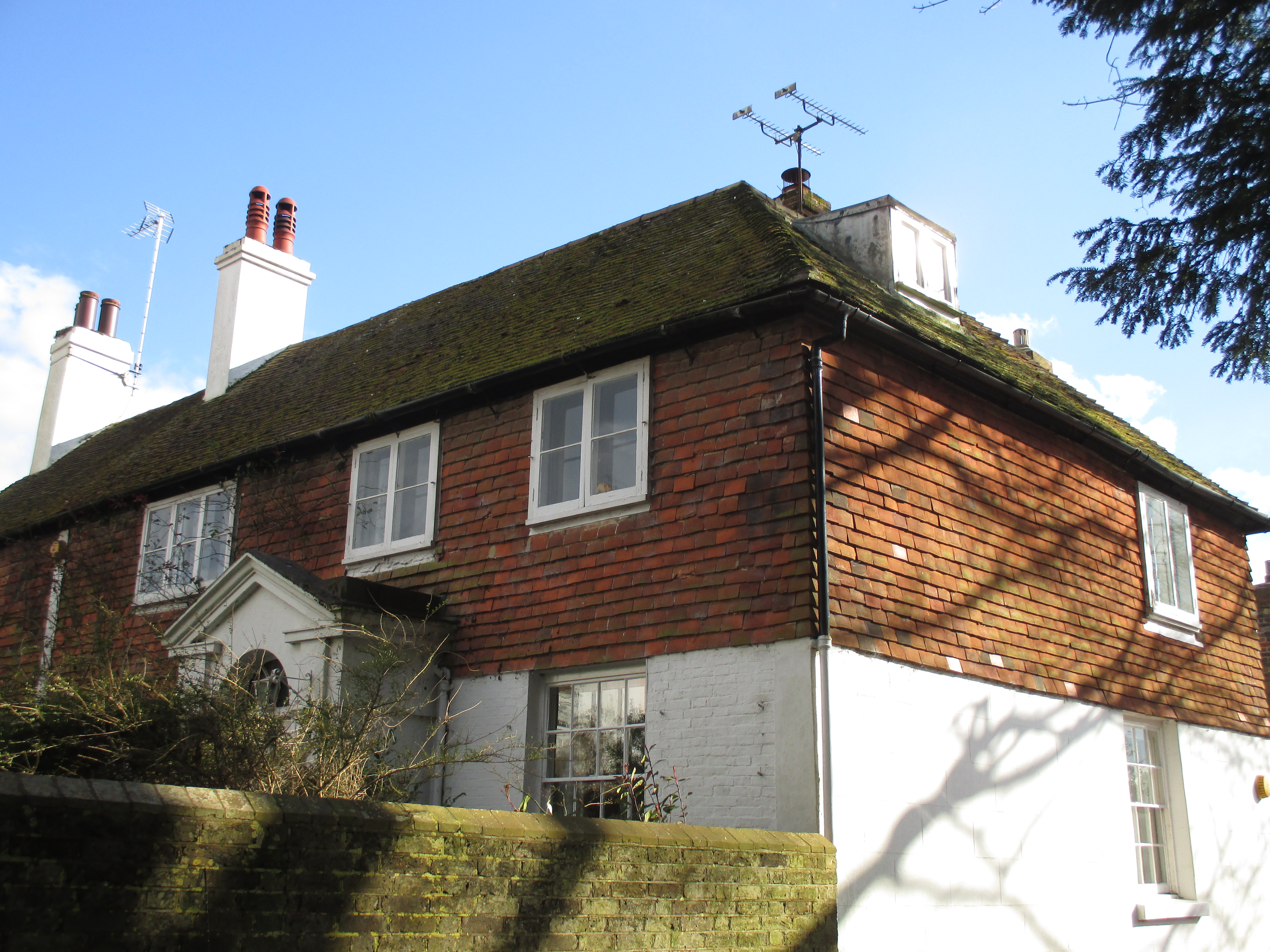
Treeps, Hurstpierpoint, the house where The Malay Archipelago was largely written

The Malay Archipelago was largely written at Treeps, Wallace's wife's family home in Hurstpierpoint, West Sussex. It was first published in Spring 1869 in two volumes by Macmillan (London), with a reprint (also in two volumes) marked 'second edition' the same year. The first US edition year by Harper & Brothers (New York) appeared in 1869 in a single volume. Wallace returned to England in 1862, but explains in the Preface that given the large quantity of specimens and his poor health after his stay in the tropics, it took a long time. He noted that he could at once have printed his notes and journals, but felt that doing that would have been disappointing and unhelpful. Instead, therefore, he waited until he had published papers on his discoveries, and other scientists had described and named as new species some 2,000 of his beetles (Coleoptera), and over 900 Hymenoptera including 200 new species of ant. (Note: Wallace, 1869. pp. vii–ix.) The book went through 10 editions, with the last published in 1890. It has been translated into at least twelve languages.

== Illustrations ==
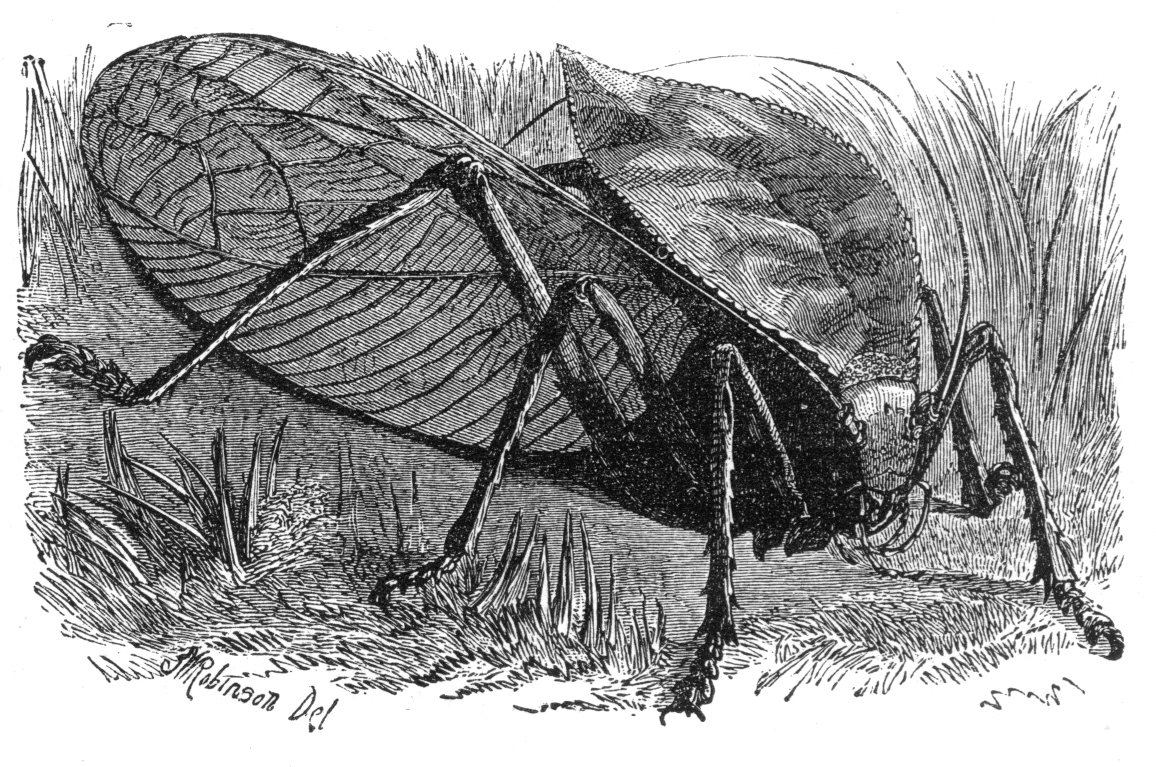
"The Great Shielded Grasshopper" drawn and signed by E. W. Robinson

The illustrations are, according to the Preface, made from Wallace's own sketches, photographs, or specimens. Wallace thanks Walter and Henry Woodbury for some photographs of scenery and native people. He acknowledges William Wilson Saunders and Mr Pascoe for horned flies and very rare longhorn beetles: all the rest were from his own enormous collection.

The original drawings were made directly on to the wood engraving blocks by leading artists Thomas Baines, Walter Hood Fitch, John Gerrard Keulemans, E. W. Robinson, Joseph Wolf, and T. W. Wood, according to the List of Illustrations. Wood also illustrated Darwin's The Descent of Man, while Robinson and Wolf both also provided illustrations for The Naturalist on the River Amazons (1863), written by Wallace's friend Henry Walter Bates.

== Contents ==
=== Volume 1 ===
1 Physical Geography
Wallace sets out the scope of the book, describing what "To the ordinary Englishman" is "perhaps the least known part of the globe." (Note: Wallace, 1869. Volume 1, p. 2.) The archipelago, he explains, stretches more than 4,000 miles east to west, and about 1,300 miles north to south, with over twenty sizeable islands and innumerable isles and islets.

==== Indo-Malay Islands ====
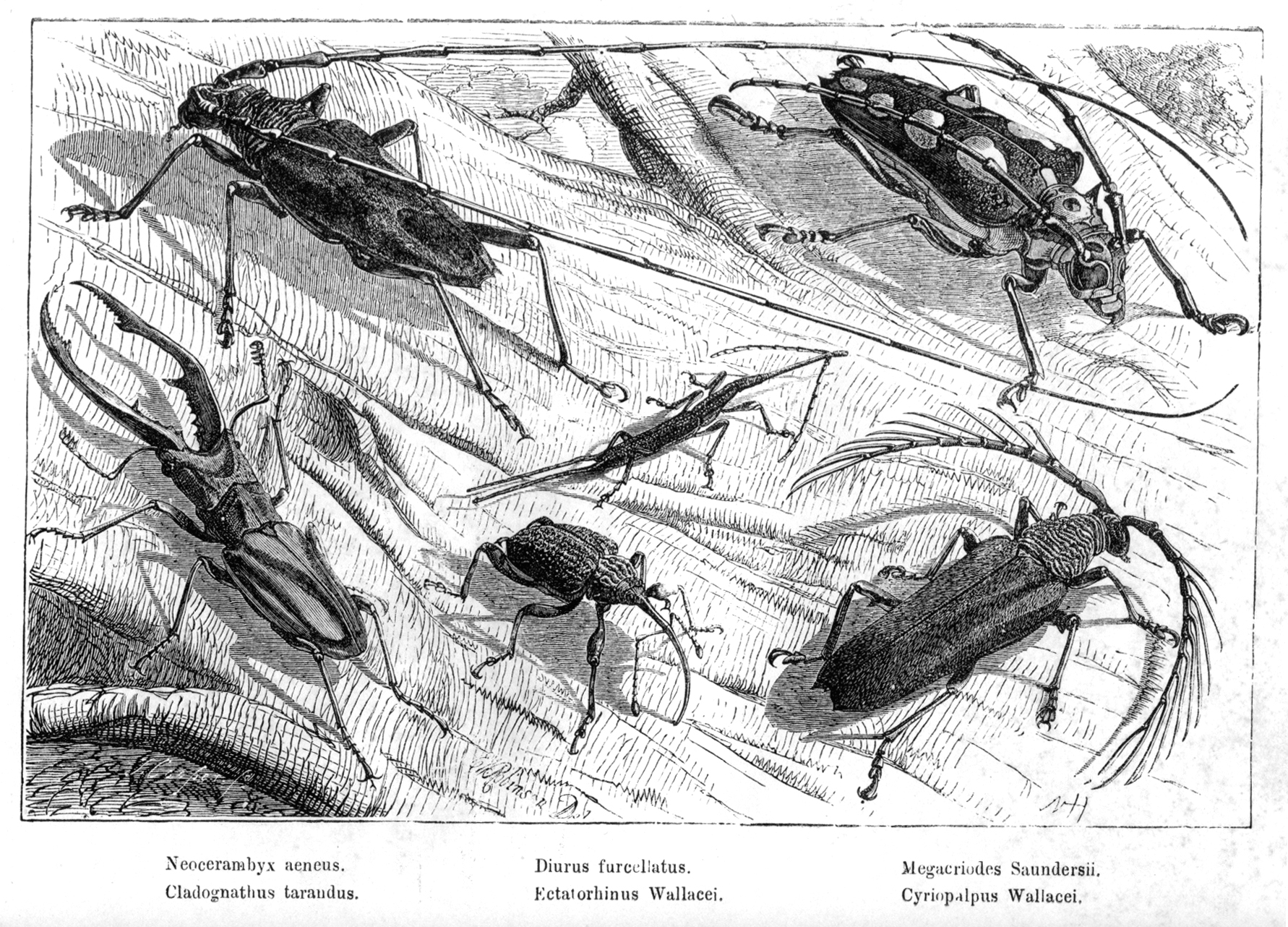
"Remarkable Beetles Found at Simunjon, Borneo: Neocerambyx æneas, Cladognathus tarandus, Diurus furcellatus, Ectatorhinus Wallacei, Megacriodes Saundersii, Cyriopalpus Wallacei"

2 Singapore
Wallace gives a lively description of the people of the town, and of the wildlife of the island. He finds the Chinese the most noticeable of the people, while in one square mile of forest he found 700 species of beetles including 130 longhorns.

3 Malacca and Mount Ophir.
He finds an attractive old Portuguese town, and beautiful birds such as the blue-billed gaper. The flora includes pitcher plants and giant ferns. There are tigers and rhinoceros, but the elephants had already disappeared.

4 Borneo—The Orang-Utan
He stays in Sarawak, and finds the Simunjon coal-works convenient, as the workers are happy to be paid a little for insects they find, including locusts, stick insects and about 24 new species of beetles each day. In all he collects 2000 species of beetle in Borneo, nearly all at the coal mine site; he also found a flying frog and orang-utans in the same place.

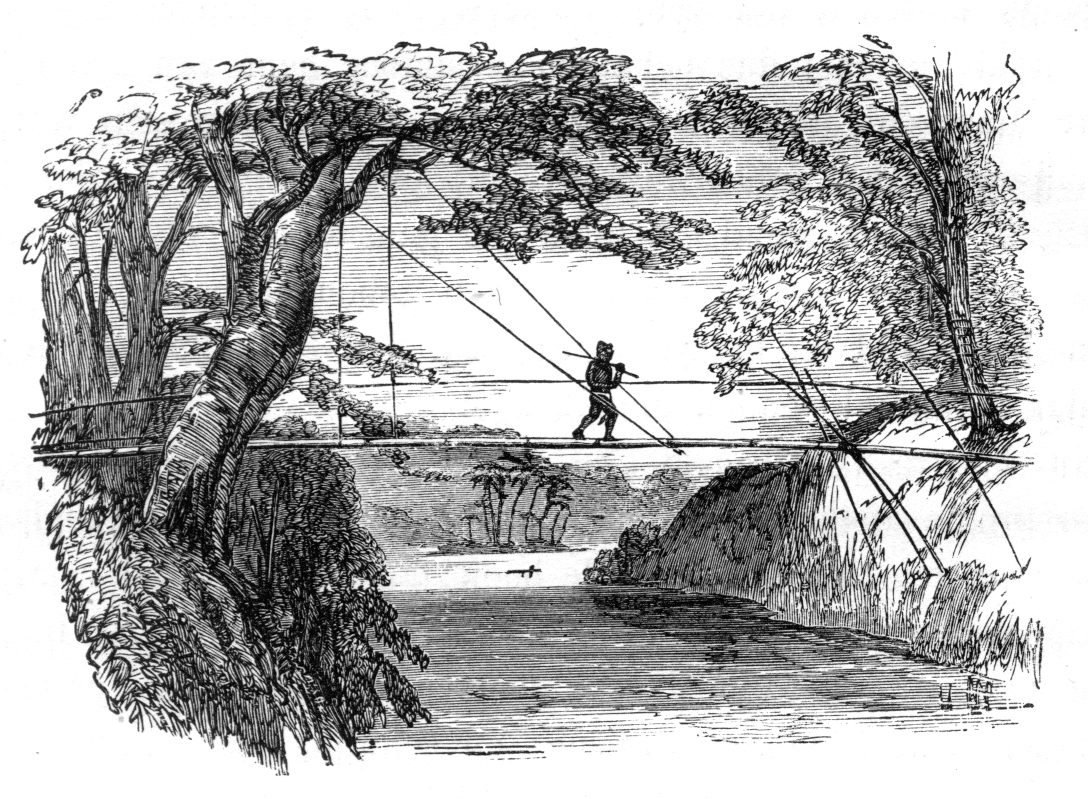
Dyak crossing a bamboo bridge

5 Borneo—Journey in the Interior
Wallace returns to Sarawak, where he stays in the circular 'head-house' of a Dyak village, travels upriver, and describes the Durian, praising it as the king of fruits with exquisite and unsurpassed flavour, (Note: Wallace, 1869. Volume 1, pp. 117–119.) and the Dyak's slender bamboo bridges, (Note: Wallace, 1869. Volume 1, pp. 123–124.) as well as ferns and Nepenthes pitcher plants. On a mountain he finds the only place in his entire journey where moths are abundant; he collected 1,386 moths on a total of 26 nights, but over 800 of these were caught on four very wet and dark nights. He attributes the reason to having a ceiling that effectively trapped the moths; in other houses the moths at once escaped into the roof, and he recommends naturalists to bring a verandah-shaped tent to enable them to catch moths. (Note: Wallace, 1869. Volume 1, pp. 132–136.)

6 Borneo—The Dyaks
Wallace describes the Dyak people, expressing surprise that despite Thomas Malthus's predictions for the human population of the world, and the lack of any obvious restraints, the Dyak population appeared to be stable.

7 Java
Wallace stayed three and a half months in Java, where he admires the system of government and the contented people. The population is, he notes, rapidly increasing, from 3.5 million in 1800 to 5.5 million in 1826 and 14 million in 1865. He enjoys the fine Hindu archaeological sites, and the flora of the mountain tops which have plants resembling those of Europe, including the royal cowslip, Primula imperialis, endemic to one mountain top.

8 Sumatra
He visits Sumatra while the coastal forest of Nipa palms is flooded to a distance of several miles from the sea. The river houses at Palembang are built on rafts moored to piles, rising and falling with the tide. He admires the traditional houses of the villages, but had difficulty getting any food there, the people living entirely on rice through the rainy season. He discovers some new species of butterfly including Papilio memnon which occurs in different forms, some being Batesian mimics of Papilio coon. He admires the camouflage of a species of dead leaf butterfly, Kallima paralekta. He is pleased that one of his hunters brings him a male hornbill, shot at its nest hole while feeding the female.

9 Natural History Of The Indo-Malay Islands.
Wallace sketches the natural history of the islands to the West of the Wallace line, noting that the flora is like that of India, as described by the botanist Joseph Dalton Hooker in his 1855 Flora Indica. Similarly the mammals are similar to those of India, including the tiger, leopard, rhinoceros and elephant. The bird species had diverged, but the genera were mainly the same, and some species of (for example) woodpecker, parrot, kingfisher and pheasant were found from India to Java and Borneo, while many more were found both in Sumatra and the Malay peninsula.

==== The Timor Group ====
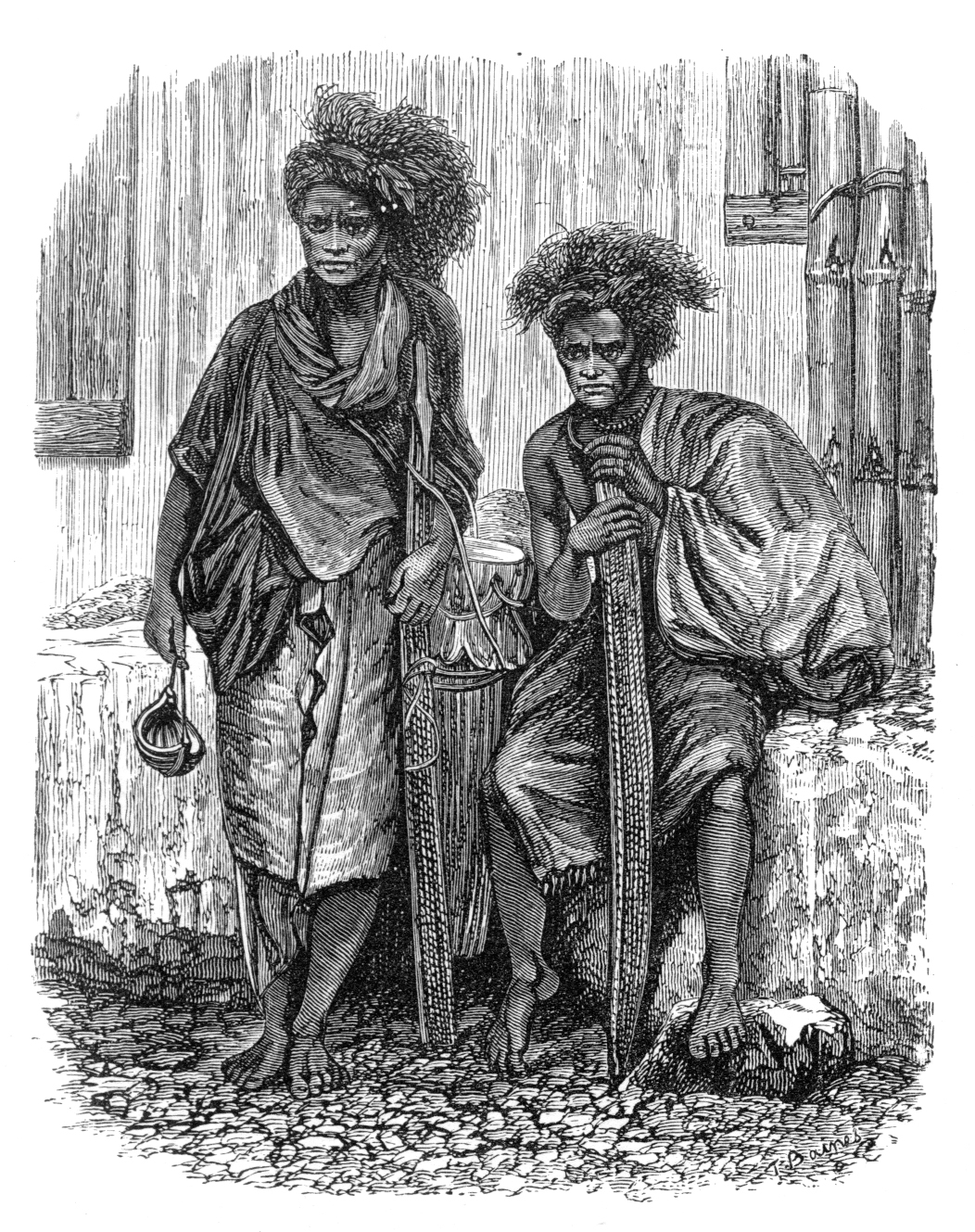
Drawing of "Timor Men" by Thomas Baines, from a photograph

10 Bali And Lombock
Wallace is grateful for an involuntary stop in Bali, which he finds one of the most interesting places of his trip, as Hindu customs and religion are still practised, while on Lombok he finds Australian birds such as cockatoos, observing that this is the most westerly point of that family's range.

11 Lombock—Manners And Customs
On Lombok, Wallace observes how guns are made, witnessing the boring of gun barrels by two men rotating a pole which is weighted down by a basket of stones. He describes the Sasak people of the island, and the custom of running amok.

12 Lombock—How The Rajah Took The Census
The whole chapter is taken up with a legend, which Wallace calls an anecdote, about the rajah (king) of Lombok. It involves taxation, needles and sacred krisses.

13 Timor
Wallace describes the island of Timor, its abundance of fan-palms, its people who are like Papuans, and the Portuguese government which he considers extremely poor. On some hills he finds Eucalyptus (gum) trees, a genus from Australia; he finds the vegetation monotonous also.

14 Natural History of the Timor Group
He finds the mixture of bird species intermediate between those of Java and Australia, with 36 species actually Javan, and 11 closely related; while there are only 13 actually Australian, with 35 closely related. Wallace interprets this to mean that a small number of birds from Australia, and a larger number from Java, colonised Timor and then evolved into new species endemic to the island. The land mammals were very few in number: the six species were endemic or related to those of Java or the Moluccas, with none from Australia, so he doubts there was ever a land bridge to that continent.

==== The Celebes Group ====
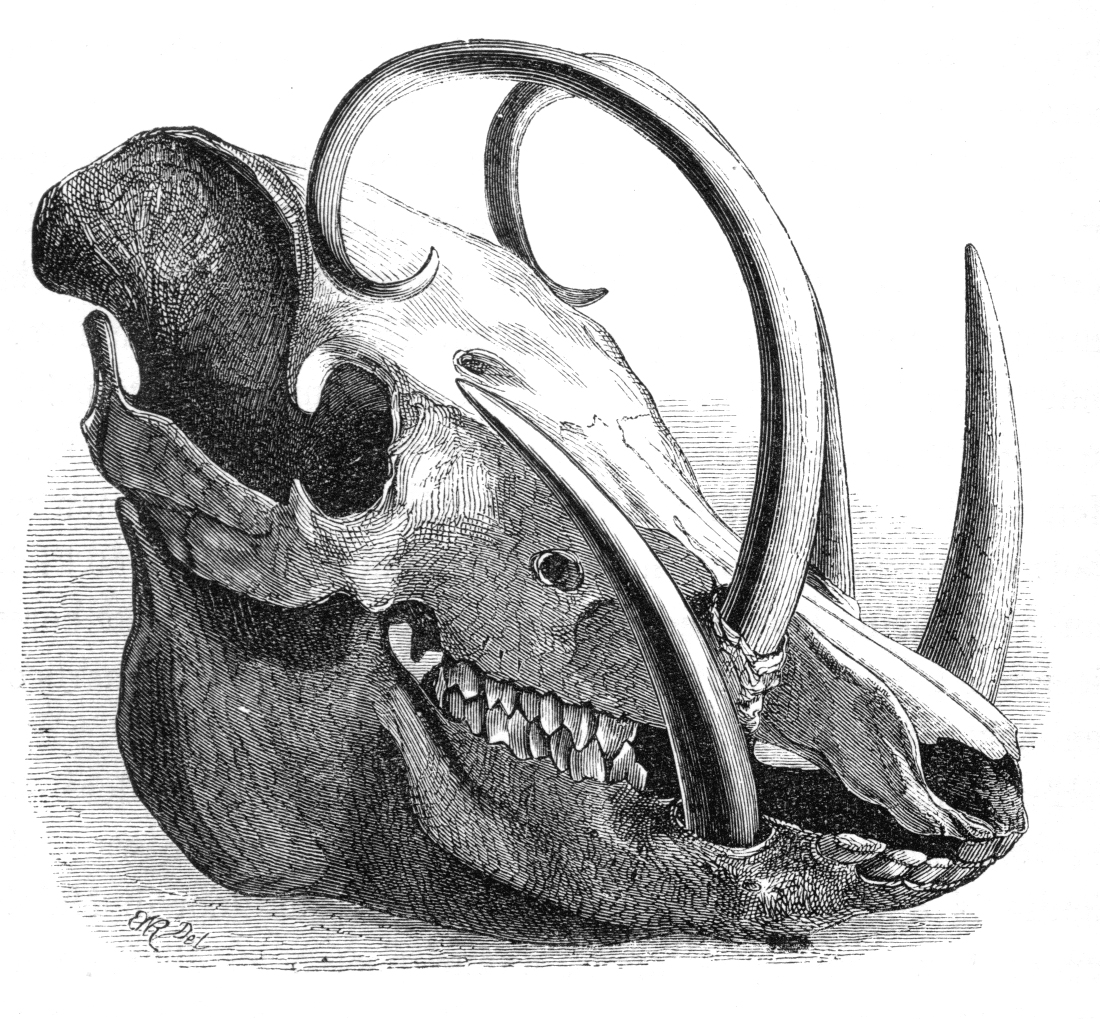
Skull of a babirusa (pig-deer) from the Celebes, by E. W. Robinson

15 Celebes—Macassar
Wallace finds staying in the town of Macassar expensive, and moves out into the countryside. He meets the rajah, and is lucky enough to stay on a farm where he is given a glass of milk every day, "one of my greatest luxuries". (Note: Wallace, 1869. Volume 1, p. 355.)

16 Celebes—Macassar
He catches some Ornithoptera (birdwings), "the largest, the most perfect, and the most beautiful of butterflies". (Note: Wallace, 1869. Volume 1, p. 364.) He uses rotten jackfruit to attract beetles, but finds few birds. The limestone mountains are eroded into skittle-shaped pillars with narrow bases.

17 Celebes—Menado
Wallace visits Menado on the northeast coast of Celebes. The people of the Minahasa region are fair-skinned, unlike anywhere else in the archipelago. He stays high in the mountains by the coffee plantations, and is often cold, but finds that the animals are no different from those lower down. The forest was full of orchids, bromeliads, clubmosses and mosses. He experiences an earthquake, but the low timber-framed houses survive with little damage. He finds that the people, under the guidance of missionaries, are the most hard-working, peaceful and civilised of the whole archipelago. He obtains (apparently by purchase) skulls of the babirusa (pig-deer) and the rare sapiutan (midget buffalo).

18 Natural History of Celebes
He describes the range of species in each group in some detail, concluding that the birds are unlike those of any of the surrounding countries and are quite isolated, but are related to those of distant places including New Guinea, Australia, India and Africa; he thinks there is nowhere else where so many such species occur in one place. Similarly in the Nymphalidae (he mentions the English member, the purple emperor butterfly), there are 48 species of which 35 are endemic to Celebes. He concludes that the Celebes group of islands is a major faunal division of the archipelago.

==== The Moluccas ====
19 Banda
He finds Banda delightful, with a smoking volcano and a fine view from the top. The nutmeg trees are beautiful but he regrets the ending of the Dutch monopoly in the nutmeg trade, which avoided the need to levy direct taxes. The only indigenous animals, he thinks, are bats, except possibly for its opossum species.

20 Amboyna
He finds the inhabitants of Amboyna lazy, but the harbour contained the most beautiful sight, "a continuous series of corals, sponges, actiniæ, and other marine productions, of magnificent dimensions, varied forms, and brilliant colours." (Note: Wallace, 1869. Volume 1, p. 463.) A large python has to be ejected from the roof-space of his house. He enjoys the true breadfruit, which he considers good in many dishes but best simply baked.

=== Volume 2 ===
==== The Moluccas (continued) ====
21 Ternate
Wallace takes on and repairs a house which he keeps for three years, drawing a plan of it in the book; it has stone walls 3 feet (1 metre) high, with posts holding up the roof; the walls and ceiling are made of the leaf-stems of the sago palm. He has a well of clean cold water, and the market provides "unwonted luxuries" of fresh food; he returns here to restore his health after arduous journeys.

22 Gilolo
He finds the large island rather dull, with much tall coarse grass and few species. In the forest he obtains some small "parroquets", brush-tongued lories, and the day-flying moth Cocytia d'Urvillei.

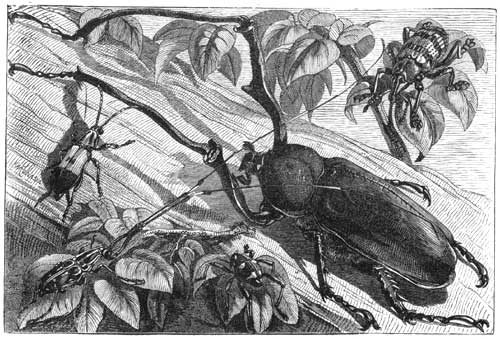
"Moluccan Beetles"

23 Voyage to the Kaióa Islands and Batchian
He hires a small boat to go to the highly recommended island of Batchian and crosses to Tidore, where he sees the comet of October 1858; it spans about 20 degrees of the night sky. They sail past the volcanic island of Makian which erupted in 1646 and devastatingly again, soon after Wallace had left the archipelago, in 1862. In the Kaióa Islands he finds some virgin forest where the beetles are more abundant than anywhere he ever saw in his life, with swarms of golden Buprestidae, rose-chafers, and long-horned weevils, as well as longicorn beetles. "It was a glorious spot, and one which will always live in my memory as exhibiting the insect-life of the tropics in unexampled luxuriance." (Note: Wallace, 1869. Volume 2, p. 32.)

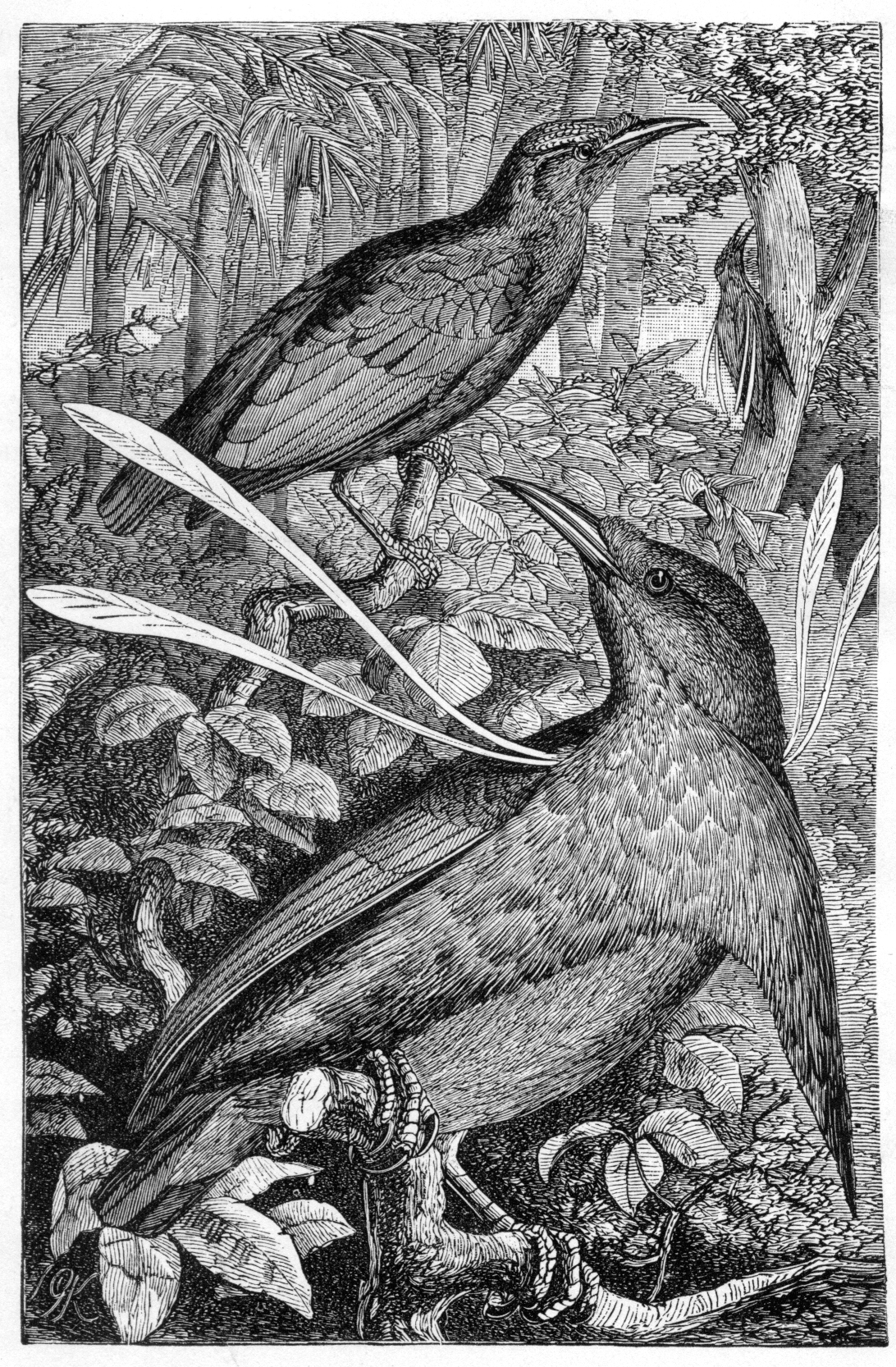
Male and female of Wallace's standardwing from Batchian, drawn on wood by Dutch engraver John Gerrard Keulemans

24 Batchian
He is lent a house by the Sultan, who offers him tea and cakes but asks him to teach him to make maps and to give him a gun and a milking goat, "all of which requests I evaded as skilfully as I was able". (Note: Wallace, 1869. Volume 2, p. 38.) His servant Ali shoots a new bird of paradise, Wallace's standardwing, "a great prize" and a "striking novelty". (Note: Wallace, 1869. Volume 2, p. 41.) He is a little disappointed in the range of insects and birds, but discovers new species of roller, sunbird and is happy to see the racquet-tailed kingfisher. His house is burgled twice; a blacksmith manages to pick his locks and make him a new set of keys; and he discovers a new species of birdwing butterfly.

25 Ceram, Goram, and the Matabello Islands
He travels to Ceram, where he enjoys the company of a multilingual Flemish plantation owner. He finds few birds despite constant searching and wading through rivers; the water and the rough ground destroy both his pairs of shoes, and he returns home on the last day lame from walking "in my stockings very painfully". (Note: Wallace, 1869. Volume 2, p. 85.) Sailing in the Matabello Islands, he is blown ten miles off course, his men fearing being swept on to the coast of New Guinea "in which case we should most likely all be murdered" as the tribes there are treacherous and bloodthirsty. (Note: Wallace, 1869. Volume 2, pp. 99–100, 111.) He is sorry to see that even the smallest children here all chew betel-nut and are disfigured by sores from a poor diet. However he enjoys their palm wine which he finds more like cider than beer, and the "water" inside young coconuts, which, he explains, is nothing like the undrinkable contents of the old dry coconuts on sale in England. He buys a prau and surprises the people by fitting it out himself, using tools "of the best London make", but lacking a large drill the holes have to be made, very slowly, by boring with hot iron rods. (Note: Wallace, 1869. Volume 2, p. 109.) Travelling round Ceram, the crew from Goram run away. He describes in detail the process of making sago.

26 Bouru
He finds he has arrived in the rainy season, seeing mainly mud and water. He complains that two months' work produce only 210 species of beetle, compared to 300 in three weeks at Amboyna. However one Cerambyx beetle was up to 3 inches (7.5 cm) long, with antennae up to 5 inches (12.5 cm) in length. He is amused at himself for finding his simple hut comfortable, once he has made a rough table and is in his rattan chair, with a mosquito net and "large Scotch plaid" to form a "little sleeping apartment". He gets 17 new (at least for the Moluccas) species of bird including a new Pitta bird. (Note: Wallace, 1869. Volume 2, p. 133.)

27 The Natural History of the Moluccas
The only carnivore in the Moluccas is the Malayan civet (Musang), which he supposes has been introduced by accident as it is kept for its musk. The Celebes Babirusa is, oddly, found on Bouru, which he supposes it reached partly by swimming, citing Sir Charles Lyell's Principles of Geology to confirm this ability. The other mammals are marsupial, so, he presumes, true natives. In contrast to the few mammals, there are at least 265 bird species, more than all of Europe, which had 257, but of these just three groups – parrots, kingfishers and pigeons – make up nearly a third, compared to only a twentieth of the birds of India. Wallace suggests this is because they came from New Guinea, which has a similar lack of some groups, and adds that many New Guinea birds have not reached the Moluccas, implying that the islands have been isolated for a long time.

==== Papuan Group ====
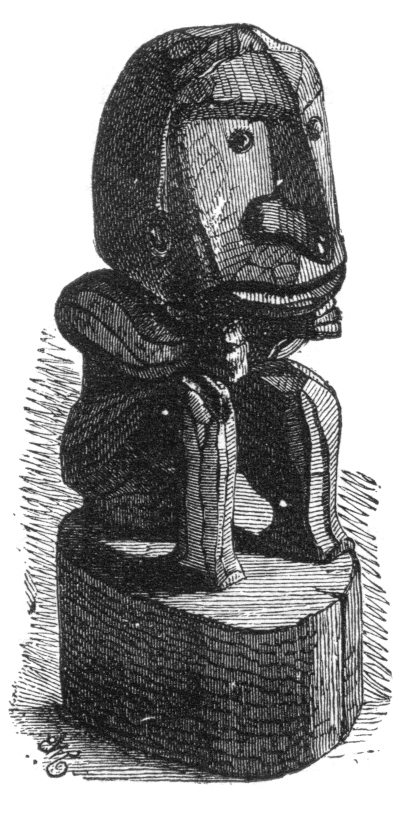
Papuan charm, by E. W. Robinson

28 Macassar to the Aru Islands in a Native Prau
Wallace decides to avoid the rainy season of Celebes by travelling to the Aru Islands, the source of pearls, mother-of-pearl, and tortoiseshell for Europe, and edible birds' nests and sea-slugs for China, even though they are inhabited by "savages". He is excited despite the danger of a 1,000-mile (1600 km) voyage in a 70-ton Bugis prau with a crew of 50, considering the islands the "Ultima Thule of the East". His small cabin was the "snuggest" he ever had at sea, and he liked the natural materials and the absence of foul-smelling paint and tar. (Note: Wallace, 1869. Volume 2, pp. 158–162.) The Molucca sea was phosphorescent, like a nebula seen in a telescope. He sees flying fish near Teor, which is wrongly marked on the charts.

29 The Ké Islands
The prau is greeted by 3 or 4 long high-beaked canoes, about 50 men naked but for shells and long plumes of cassowary feathers, singing and shouting as they rowed, who board the prow with high exuberance "intoxicated with joy and excitement" asking for tobacco. (Note: Wallace, 1869. Volume 2, p. 177.) It is at once clear to Wallace these Papuans are not Malays in appearance or behaviour. (Note: Wallace, 1869. Volume 2, p. 176.) They are expert boat-builders, using only axe, adze and auger, fitting planks together so well that a knife-blade can hardly be inserted anywhere. (Note: Wallace, 1869. Volume 2, pp. 184–186.) They use no money, bartering for knives, cloth and "arrack" brandy, and bring many beetles including a new jewel beetle species, Cyphogastra calepyga, in return for tobacco.

30 The Aru Islands—Residence in Dobbo
On one day he captures about 30 species of butterfly, the most since he was in the Amazon, including the "large and handsome spectre-butterfly, Hestia durvillei", (Note: Wallace, 1869. Volume 2, pp. 199–200.) and a few days later

one of the most magnificent insects the world contains, the great bird-winged butterfly, Ornithoptera poseidon. I trembled with excitement as I saw it coming majestically towards me,... and was gazing, lost in admiration, at the velvet black and brilliant green of its wings, seven inches across, its golden body, and crimson breast... The village of Dobbo held that evening at least one contented man."

— Wallace

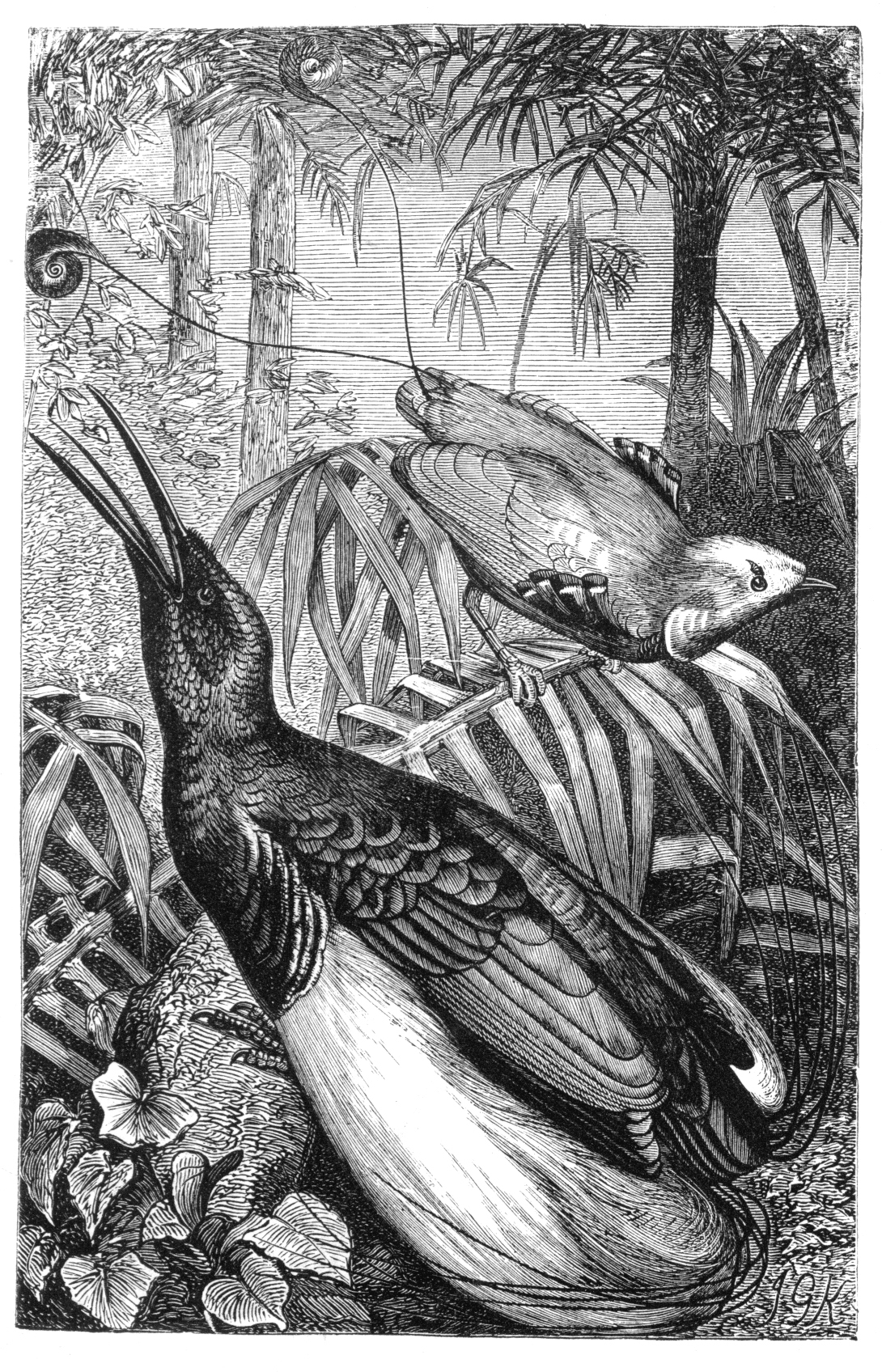
"The 'king' and the 'twelve wired' birds of paradise", drawn on wood by J. G. Keulemans

31 The Aru Islands—Journey and Residence in the Interior
He is brought a king bird-of-paradise, amusing the islanders with his excitement; it had been one of his goals for travelling to the archipelago. He reflects on how their beauty is wasted in the "dark and gloomy woods, with no intelligent eye to gaze upon their loveliness", but that when "civilized man" reaches the islands he will certainly upset the balance of nature and make the birds extinct. (Note: Wallace, 1869. Volume 2, pp. 222–224.) He finds the men the most beautiful of all the peoples he has stayed among, the women less handsome "except in extreme youth". (Note: Wallace, 1869. Volume 2, p. 254.)

32 The Aru Islands—Second Residence in Dobbo
He sees a cock-fight in the street, but is more interested in a game of football, played with a hollow ball of rattan, and remarks the "excessive cheapness" (Note: Wallace, 1869. Volume 2, p. 271.) of all goods including those made in Europe or America, which he believes causes idleness and drunkenness because there is no need to work hard to obtain goods. He admires a crimson-flowered tree surrounded with flocks of blue and orange lories. He is given some birds' nest soup, which he found almost tasteless.

33 The Aru Islands—Physical Geography and Aspects of Nature
The islands are completely crossed by three narrow channels which resemble and are called rivers, though they are inlets of the sea. The wildlife is much like that of New Guinea, 150 miles (240 km) away, which he supposes was once connected by a land bridge. Most flowers are green; large and showy flowers are rare or absent.

34 New Guinea—Dorey
He travels to New Guinea after long anticipation. The coastal village houses stand in the water; they have boat-shaped roofs, and often have human skulls hanging under the eaves, trophies of battles with their attackers, the Arfaks. The council house has "revolting" carvings of naked figures. He finds the inhabitants often very handsome, as they are tall with aquiline noses and heads of carefully combed "frizzly" hair. (Note: Wallace, 1869. Volume 2, pp. 305–306.) He failed to find the birds of paradise described by the French pharmacist and botanist René Primevère Lesson, but is pleased with the horned deer-flies, including Elaphomia cervicornis and E. wallacei. He injured his ankle and had to rest as it became an ulcer, while all his men had fever, dysentery or ague. When he recovers, birds are scarce, but he finds about 30 species of beetles each day on average; on two memorable days he finds 78 and 95 kinds, his personal record; it takes him 6 hours to pin and lay out the specimens afterwards. In all he collected over 800 species of beetle in Dorey. He leaves "without much regret" as he never visited a place with "more privations and annoyances." (Note: Wallace, 1869. Volume 2, p. 327.)

35 Voyage from Ceram to Waigiou
He is blown far off course while trying to reach his assistant, Mr Allen, losing some men who went ashore, dragging anchor, running on to a coral reef, and guided by an incorrect map; it took 8 days "among the reefs and islands of Waigiou" (Note: Wallace, 1869. Volume 2, p. 347.) to return to a safe harbour. He sends a boat to rescue his men; it returns 10 days later without them, but he pays them again, and on the second attempt it returns with his two men, who had survived for a month "on the roots and tender flower-stalks of a species of Bromelia, on shell-fish, and on a few turtles' eggs." (Note: Wallace, 1869. Volume 2, p. 348.)

36 Waigiou
He builds a palm-leaf hut, which leaks badly until they increase the slope of the roof. He shoots a red bird-of-paradise. He supposes the people to be of mixed race. He sails to Bessir where the chief lends him a tiny hut on stilts, entered by a ladder, and not tall enough to stand up in. He learns to live and work "in a semi-horizontal position"; (Note: Wallace, 1869. Volume 2, p. 360.) he is the first white man to come to the island. He trades goods for birds-of-paradise; the people do not shoot them with blunt arrows like Aru islanders, but set out fruit as bait on a forked stick, and catch the birds with a noose of cord that hangs from the stick down to the ground, pulling the cord when the bird arrives, sometimes after two or three days.

37 Voyage from Waigiou to Ternate
While sailing back to Ternate the boat is overtaken by a dozen waves which approached with a dull roaring like heavy surf, the sea being "perfectly smooth" (Note: Wallace, 1869. Volume 2, p. 371.) before and after; he concludes these must have been earthquake waves as William Dampier had described. Later he learnt that there had been an earthquake on Gilolo that day. On the journey they lose their anchor, and their mooring cable is snapped by a squall. New wooden anchors are ingeniously made. The men believe the boat is unlucky and ask for a ceremony before travelling further. They are caught by a storm and lose the small boat they are towing. Wallace notes that in 78 days there was "not one single day of fair wind." (sic) (Note: Wallace, 1869. Volume 2, p. 384.)

38 The Birds of Paradise
Wallace, pointing out that he often journeyed expressly to obtain specimens, describes the birds-of-paradise in detail, and the effects of sexual selection by the females. He covers the great, king, red, magnificent, superb, golden or six-shafted, standard wing, twelve-wired, and epimaque or long-tailed birds-of-paradise, as well as three New Guinea birds which he considers almost as remarkable. He suggests they could live well if released in the Palm House at Kew Gardens. In all he knows of 18 species, of which 11 are from New Guinea and 8 are endemic to it and Salwatty, or 14 in the general New Guinea area (1 being from the Moluccas and 3 from Australia). His assistant Mr Allen runs into trouble as the people were suspicious of his motives. A year of five voyages had produced only 5 of the 14 species in the New Guinea area.

39 Natural History of the Papuan Islands
New Guinea, writes Wallace, is mostly unknown, with only the wildlife of the northwestern peninsula partially explored, but already 250 land birds are known, making the island of great interest. There are few mammals, mostly marsupials, including a kangaroo (first seen by Le Brun in 1714).

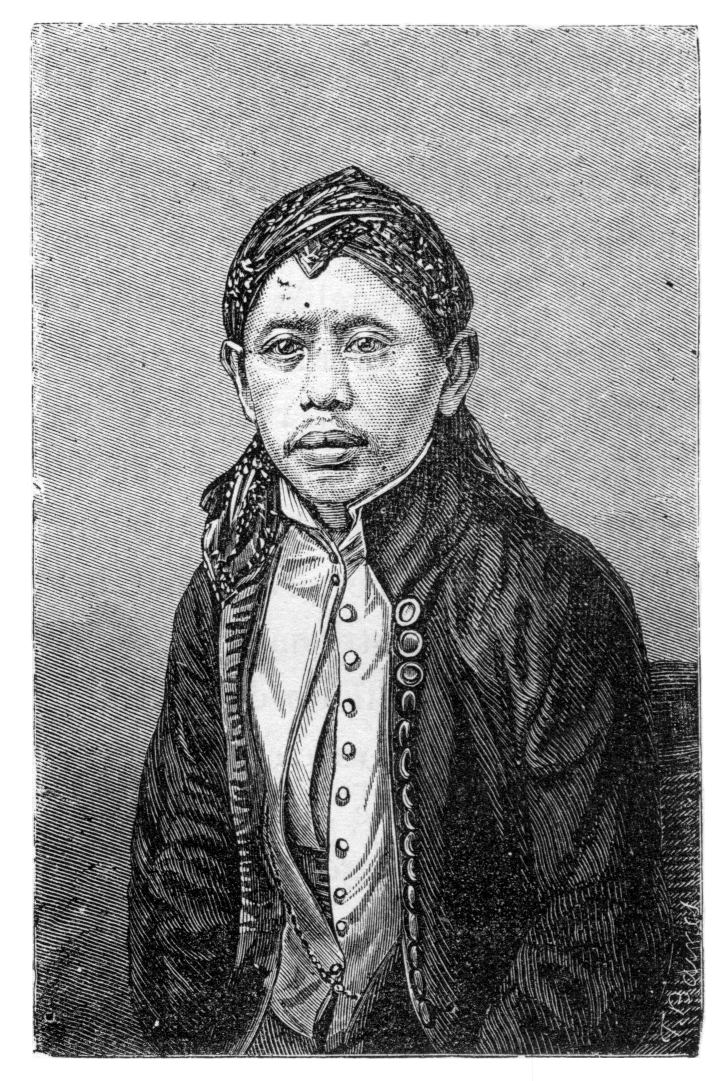
"Portrait of a Javanese Chief"

40 The Races of Man in the Malay Archipelago
Wallace ends the book by describing his views on the peoples of the archipelago. He finds the Malays, such as the Javanese, the most civilised, though he describes the Dyaks of Borneo and the Bataks of Sumatra, among others, as "the savage Malays". (Note: Wallace, 1869. Volume 2, p. 441.) He quotes the traveller Nicolo Conti's 1430 account of them, with other early descriptions. He thinks the Papuan the opposite of the Malay, impulsive and demonstrative where the Malay is impassive and taciturn. He speculates about their origins, and in a note at the end, criticises English society.

==== Appendix ====
On Crania And Languages
Wallace mentions Huxley's theory, and Dr. Joseph Barnard Davis's book Thesaurus Craniorum, which supposed that human races could be distinguished by the shape of the cranium, the dome of the skull, of which theory Wallace is sceptical. However he lists measurements he had taken of the crania of "Malays" and "Papuans", noting that within the Malay group there was enormous variation. He had few skulls in the Papuan group and there were no definite differences between the two groups.

The language appendix lists 9 words (black, white, fire, water, large, small, nose, tongue, tooth) in 59 of the languages encountered in the archipelago, and 117 words in 33 of those languages, making it clear that many of the languages have many words in common.

== Reception ==
=== Contemporary ===
The Malay Archipelago was warmly received on publication, often in lengthy reviews that attempted to summarise the book, from the perspective that suited the reviewing periodical. It was reviewed in more than 40 periodicals: a selection of those reviews is summarised below.

==== Anthropological Review ====
The Anthropological Review notes that while the descriptions of animal life are "full of interest", "our readers, as anthropologists, will, however, take a keener interest" in the "great man-like ape of Borneo,—the orang-utan, or mias, as it is called by the aborigines". Two pages are taken up with a discussion of the orang utan. The review then turns to Wallace's observations on "the races of man" in the book, observing that the anthropological details given are useful but perhaps chosen to support "a particular theory", namely Wallace's belief that there were eastern and western races—"Malays" and "Papuans", though the boundary between them was east of the Wallace line. The review accepts Wallace's data on natural history, but suspects he was selective in recording details of individuals. It notes that Wallace agreed with French authors that the Polynesians (included in his Papuans) "had a local origin". The review remarks that "Mr Wallace relies more on the diversity of moral features to prove differences of race than on physical peculiarities, although he declares that these are strongly marked" and doubts the difference, and wonders whether the "Javan chief" and the Dyak do not differ more. The review, after ten pages of reflections on race, concludes by recommending the book to its readers as much better than ordinary travel books "and even in the absence of any very stirring incidents" that it will "amply repay the perusal" of both scientific and general readers.

==== Journal of the Ethnological Society of London ====
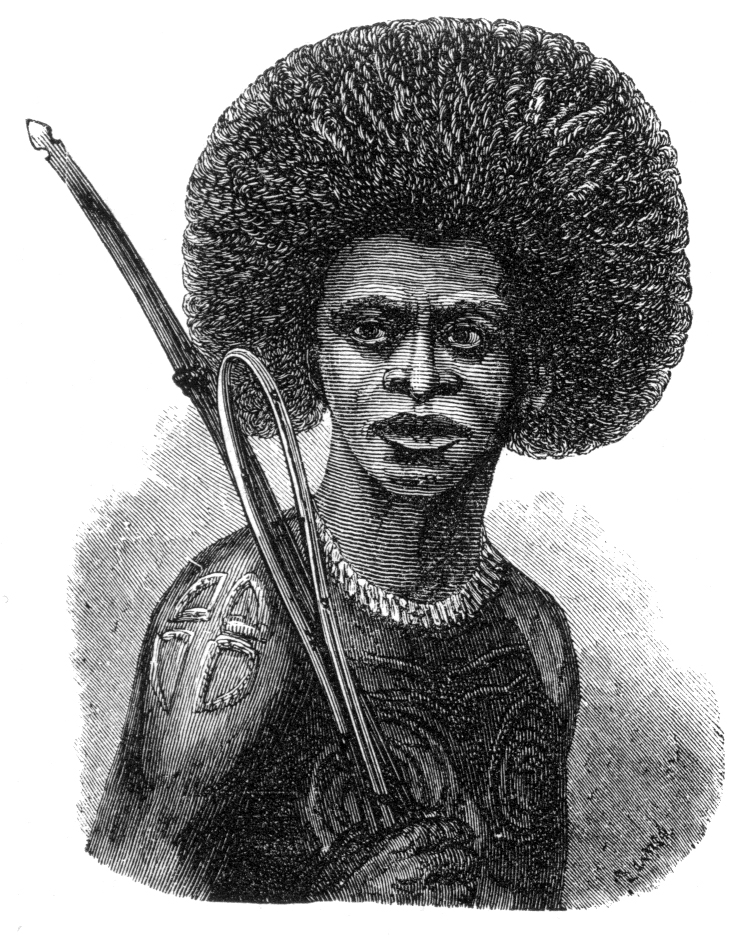
"Papuan, New Guinea" was reprinted from The Malay Archipelago in the Ethnological Society's review.

The Journal of the Ethnological Society of London focussed exclusively on the ethnology in the book, praising the value both of the information and of Wallace's "thoughtful and suggestive speculation". The review notes that Wallace identified two "types of mankind" in the archipelago, "the Malayan and the Papuan", and that he thought these two had "no traceable affinity to each other". It remarks that Wallace greatly extends knowledge of the people of Timor, Celebes, and the Maluccas, while also adding to what is known of the Malays and Papuans, reprinting his entire description and his engraving of a Papuan. The reviewer remarks that the portrait "would as well suit a Papuan of the south-east coast of New Guinea as any of those whom Mr. Wallace saw", noting however that the southern tribes are more varied in skin colour. The reviewer disagrees with Wallace about the extension of this "Papuan race" as far as Fiji, noting that there are or were people like that in Tasmania, but that their features and height varied widely, perhaps forming a series. The reviewer disagrees also that the Sandwich Islanders and "New Zealanders" (Maori) are related to the Papuans; and with Wallace's claim that the presence of Malay words in Polynesian languages is caused by the "roaming habits" – trade and navigation – of the Malays, arguing instead that the Polynesians long ago migrated from "some common seat in, or near, the Malay Archipelago". The review ends by stating that despite all these disagreements, it holds Wallace's ethnology in "high estimation".

==== Royal Geographical Society ====
Sir Roderick Murchison, giving a speech at the Royal Geographical Society, felt able to "feel a pride" in Wallace's success, and in the "striking contributions" made to science. He takes interest in "Wallace's line" which he calls "this ingenious speculation", with "the two faunas wonderfully contrasted" either side of the deep channel between Borneo and Celebes, or Bali and Lombok. He points out the same principle between the British Isles and continental Europe, though there the conclusion is rather that the same fauna and flora is found on both sides. However, Murchison states his disagreement with Wallace's support for James Hutton's principle of uniformitarianism, that "all former changes of the outline of the earth were produced slowly", opining that the Bali–Lombok channel probably formed suddenly. He mentions in one sentence that the book contains "interesting and important facts" on physical geography, native inhabitants, climate and products of the archipelago, and describes Wallace as a great naturalist and a "most attractive writer".

==== The Ladies' Repository ====
One of the shortest reviews was in The Ladies' Repository, which found it

a highly valuable and intensely interesting contribution to our knowledge of a part of the world but little known in Europe or America. But few of our tourists ever visit it, and scarcely any have ever gone to explore it. Mr. Wallace is not an amateur traveler, making a hasty visit, to return and write a hasty and almost useless book. He is an enthusiastic naturalist, a geographer, and geologist, a student of man and nature.

—

The reviewer notes the region is "of terrific grandeur, parts of it being perpetually illuminated by discharging volcanoes, and all of it frequently shaken with earthquakes." The review summarises the book's geographical reach and style in a paragraph.

==== The Popular Science Review ====
The Popular Science Review began by writing that "We never remember to have taken up a book which gave us more pleasure". It was quite unlike the dull journey logs of most travel books; it was "a romance, which is, nevertheless, plain matter of fact". The review especially admires the way that Wallace "has generalised on the facts" rather than just shooting "a multitude of birds" and interminably describing them. The account notes that Wallace was the joint originator of the theory of natural selection, and summarises the discovery of the Wallace line in some detail. The review ends by placing the Malay Archipelago between Charles Lyell's Principles of Geology and Darwin's Origin of Species.

==== American Quarterly Church Review ====
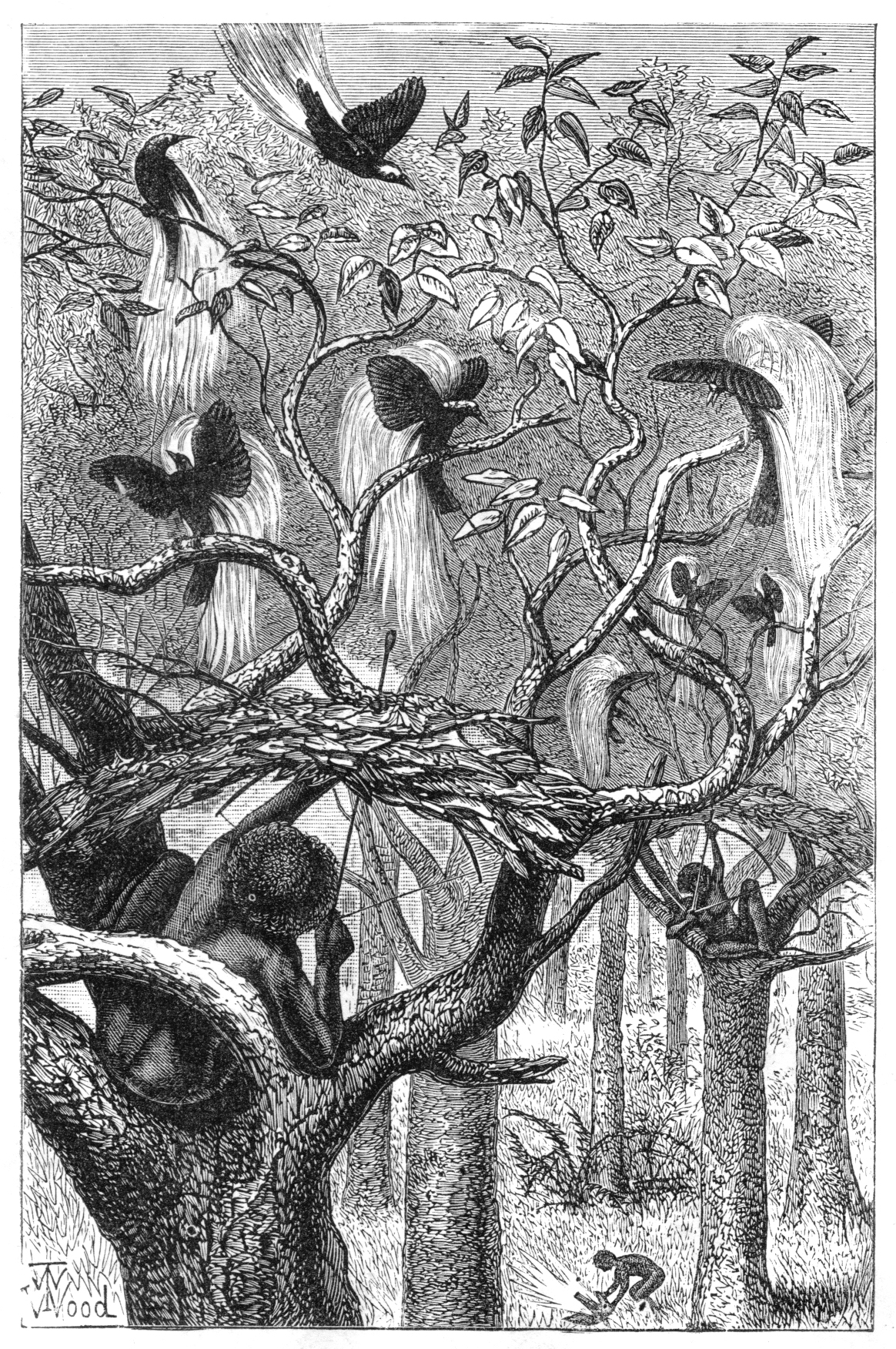
"Natives of Aru shooting the great bird of paradise"

The American Quarterly Church Review admires Wallace's bravery in going alone among the "barbarous races" in a "villainous climate" with all the hardships of travel, and his hard work in skinning, stuffing, drying and bottling so many specimens. Since "As a scientific man he follows Darwin" the review finds "his theories sometimes need as many grains of salt as his specimens." But the review then agrees that the book will "make the world wiser about its more solitary and singular children, hid away over the seas", and opines that no-one will mind paying the price of the book to read about the birds of paradise, "those bird-angels, with flaming wings of crimson and gold and scarlet, who twitter and gambol and make merry among the great island trees, while the Malay hunts for them with his blunt-headed arrows..." The review concludes that the book is a fresh and valuable record of "a remote and romantic land".

==== Australian Town and Country Journal ====
The Australian Town and Country Journal begins by stating that

Mr. Wallace is generally understood to be the originator of the theory of "Natural Selection" as propounded by Mr. Darwin, and certainly .. he brings numerous phenomena which he regards as illustrative of that theory very vividly under the notice of his readers, and that, too, as if he were but a disciple of Mr. Darwin, and not an original discoverer.

—

and quickly makes clear that it objects to Wallace's doubts about "indications of design" in plants. Despite this "grave" fault, the reviewer considers the book to be of immense value, and that it would become a standard work on the region. The review quotes a paragraph that paints "a picture of country life in the Celebes", where Wallace describes his host, a Mr. M., who relied on his gun to supply his table with wild pigs, deer, and jungle fowl, while enjoying his own milk, butter, rice, coffee, ducks, palm wine and tobacco. However, the Australian reviewer doubted Wallace's judgement about flavours, given that he praised the Durian fruit, namely that it tastes of custard, cream cheese, onion sauce, brown sherry "and other incongruities", whereas "most Europeans" found it "an abomination".

Otherwise, the review notes that Wallace seemed to have enjoyed his time in the Celebes, with the hornbills flapping past, and the baboons staring down from their trees, and enjoys his enthusiasm for the birds of paradise. The review is respectful of his account of the Wallace line, having no difficulty agreeing that the Australian-type vegetation continues into the archipelago as far as Lombok and Celebes. It concludes that he covers almost every natural phenomenon he came across "with the accuracy and discriminating sagacity of an accomplished naturalist", and explains that the "great charm" of the book is "a truthful simplicity" which inspires confidence.

==== Calcutta Review ====
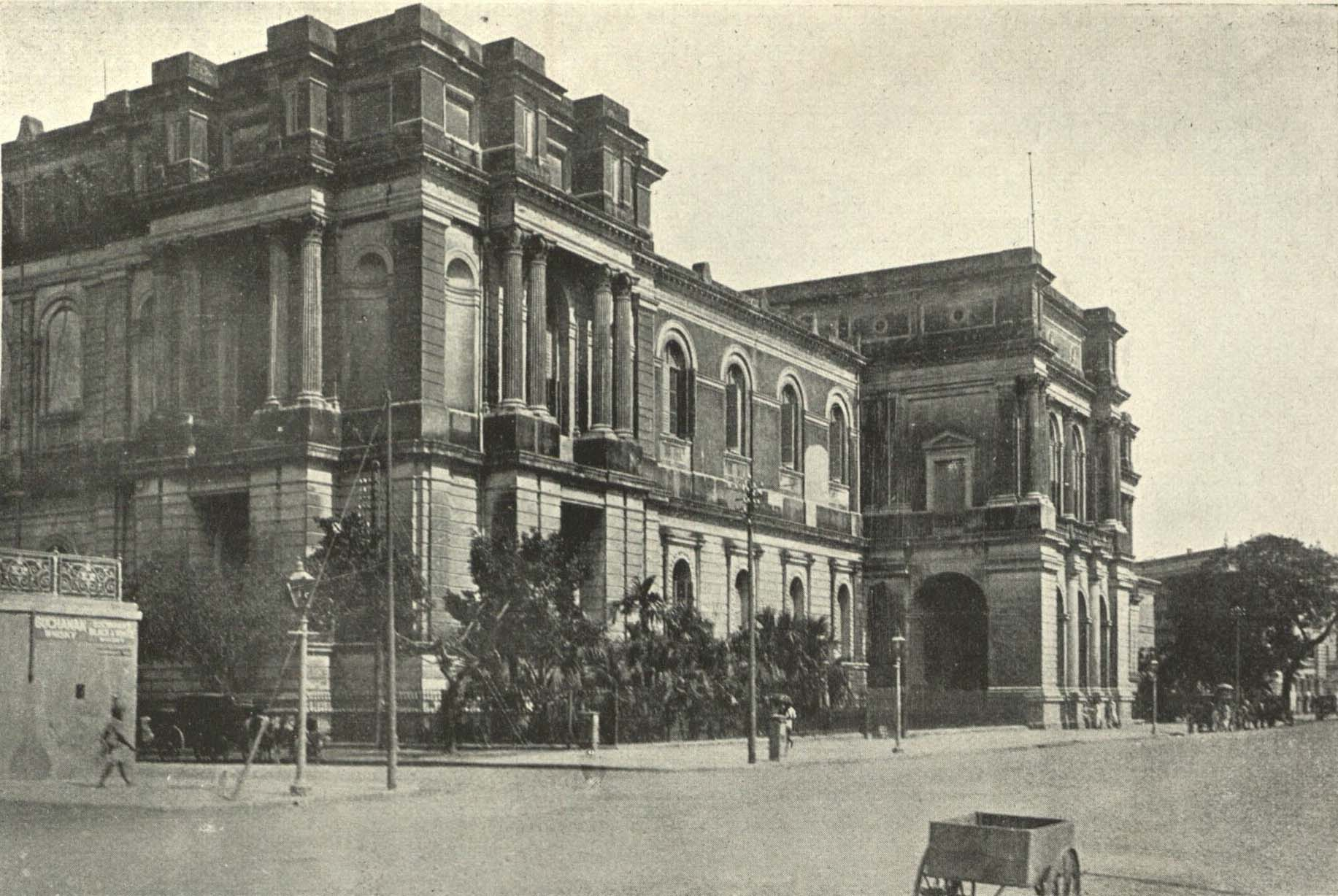
The Indian Museum, Calcutta

The Calcutta Review starts by noting that this is a book that cannot be done justice in a brief notice, that Wallace is a most eminent naturalist, and chiefly known as a Darwinian; the book was the most interesting to cross the reviewer's desk since Palgrave's Arabia (1865) and Sir Samuel Baker's Explorations of the Nile (1866). By combining geography, geology and ethnology into one narrative, the reader is saved "the monotony of traversing the same regions several times". The review describes in detail Wallace's findings of different birds and mammals either side of the Wallace line. It notes Wallace's cheerfulness and good temper in the face of "the difficulties and inconveniences attendant upon foreign travel", such as having to cross "a hundred miles of open sea in a little boat of four tons burthen", which Wallace calmly describes as comparatively comfortable. The reviewer remarks that Wallace was "set down as a conjuror by these simple people" with unimaginable purposes from a faraway country, but is less admiring about Wallace's moralising tone, especially when he supposes that "wild communities" can be happier than "in a more highly civilised society". The review ends with some reflections of surprise on how little-known the Malay Archipelago is in India, given that they were closely connected with Hindu temples in Java and Bali, and hopes that soon there will be some "productions" of the archipelago in the Indian Museum of Calcutta.

==== Revue des Deux Mondes ====
The book's fame spread beyond the English-speaking world. R. Radau wrote a lengthy review of Un naturaliste dans l'Archipel Malais in the French Revue des Deux Mondes. Radau notes the many deaths from volcanic eruptions in the archipelago, before explaining the similarity of the fauna of Java and Sumatra with that of central Asia, while that of the Celebes carries the mark of Australia, seeming to be the last representatives of another age. Radau describes Wallace's experiences in Singapore, where goods were far cheaper than in Europe – wire, knives, corkscrews, gunpowder, writing-paper, and he remarks on the spread of the Jesuits into the interior, though the missionaries had to live on just 750 francs a year. Singapore was covered in wooded hills, and the sawn wood and rotten trunks supported innumerable beetles for the naturalist to study. The only disagreeable element was that the tigers that roared in the forest devoured on average one Chinese per day, especially in the ginger plantations.

Radau summarises one passage from the book after another: the orang utans of Borneo wrestling open the jaws of a crocodile, or killing a python; the Timorese walking up tall trees, leaning back on ropes as they pull themselves upwards; the indescribable taste of a durian fruit, at once recalling custard, almond paste, roasted onions, sherry and a host of other things, that melts on the tongue, that one does not want to stop eating; more, the fruit has a repulsive odour, and the tree is dangerous, as the hard and heavy fruits can fall on your head. Radau follows Wallace up to the high plateaux of Java, where there are cypress forests covered in moss and lichen; finally at the summit the vegetation seems European, an island vegetation recalling the resemblance between the plants of the high Alps and of Lapland. And in Celebes, men run amok, generally killing a dozen people before meeting their own death.

Radau returns to food, describing sago and the breadfruit tree. The breadfruit tastes like Yorkshire pudding or mashed potato; with meat it is the best of vegetables; with sugar, milk, butter or molasses, it is a delicious pudding with a special flavour; Radau hopes that perhaps it will one day be found in European markets. As for the sago palm, one tree yields 1,800 cakes, enough to feed a man for a year.

There is torrential rain; there are savages; there are dangerous trips in small boats. Only in the final paragraph does Radau reflect on it all: "We have tried, in this study on Wallace's two volumes, to give an idea of what he saw in his eight-year stay in the Far East." He admits he has left out most of the natural history, and regrets not having space for more "charming pages" which would have taken him too far. He joins Wallace in reflecting on the relative state of "civilized" and "savage", wondering which is morally superior, and notes the "nostalgia for the primitive state", concluding that civilisation brings the benefit of reason to restrain hasty action.

=== Modern ===
==== The Guardian ====
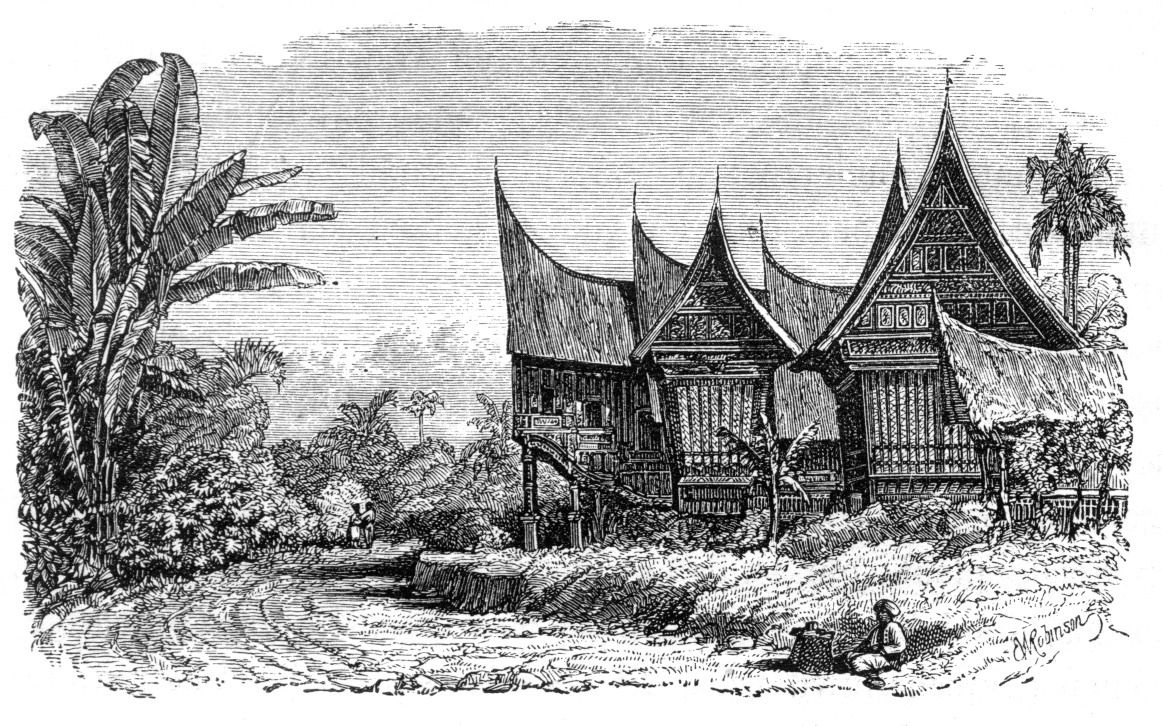
"Chief's House and Rice-shed in a Sumatran Village", by E.W. Robinson

Tim Radford, writing in The Guardian, considers that The Malay Archipelago shows Wallace to be "an extraordinary figure", since he is

an adventurer who does not present himself as adventurous; he is a Victorian Englishman abroad with all the self-assurance but without the lordly superiority of the coloniser; he is the chronicler of wonders who refuses to exaggerate, or to believe anybody else's improbable marvels: what he can see and examine (and, very often, shoot) is wonder enough for him.

— Tim Radford

Radford finds "delights on every page", such as the Wallace line between the islands of Bali and Lombok; the sparkling observations, like "the river bed 'a mass of pebbles, mostly pure white quartz, but with abundance of jasper and agate'"; the detailed but lively accounts of natural history and physical geography; the respectful and friendly attitude to the native peoples such as the hill Dyaks of Borneo; and his unclouded observations of human society, such as the way a Bugis man in Lombok runs amok, where Wallace

begins to reflect on the possible satisfactions of mass murder as a form of honourable suicide for the brooding and resentful man who 'will not put up with such cruel wrongs, but will be revenged on mankind and die like a hero.'

— Tim Radford

==== The Observer ====
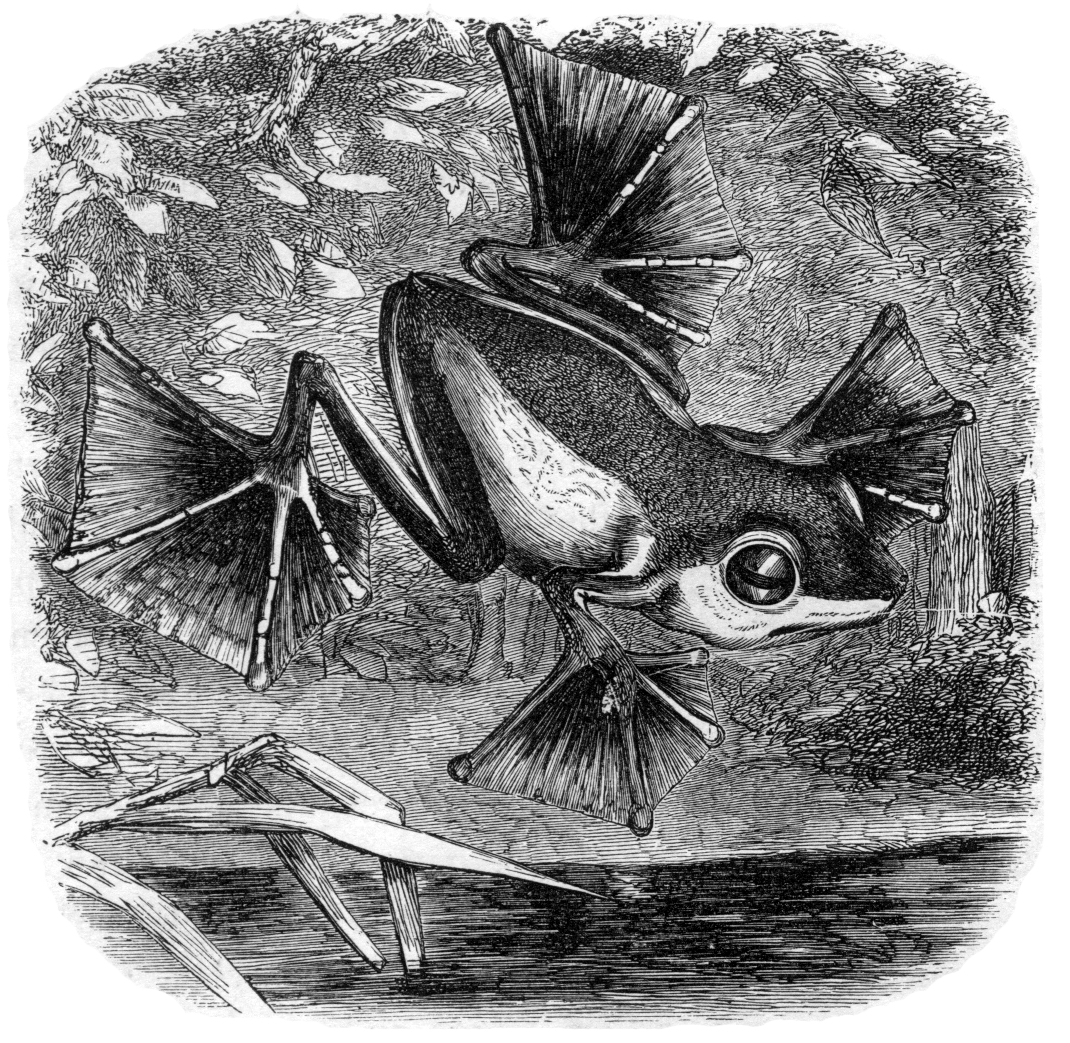
The flying frog of Borneo

Robin McKie, in The Observer, writes that the common view of Wallace "as a clever, decent cove who knew his place" as second fiddle to Charles Darwin is rather lopsided. Wallace, he writes, is "capable of great insights" in the Malay Archipelago. Travelling over 14,000 miles and collecting 125,000 specimens, he also made "scrupulous notes" for the book which

subtly combines wildlife descriptions, geological musings and tales about the villagers, merchants and sultans he encountered on his travels through the East Indies.

— Robin McKie

In McKie's view, Wallace was a gifted writer with "an eye for catchy observation", and this is one of the finest of travel books. McKie liked the account of Wallace's night sleeping "'with half-a-dozen smoke-dried human skulls suspended over my head'".

==== In research ====
The researcher Charles Smith rates the Malay Archipelago as "Wallace's most successful work, literarily and commercially", placing it second only to his Darwinism (1889) among his books for academic citations.

== Influence on other works ==
The Malay Archipelago influenced many works starting with those of Wallace's contemporaries. The novelist Joseph Conrad used it as source material for some of his novels, including Almayer's Folly, An Outcast of the Islands, and The Rescue. Commentators have suggested it had a particularly profound influence on Lord Jim, crediting it with among other things the inspiration for the character Stein the entomologist. Conrad's assistant Richard Curle wrote that The Malay Archipelago was Conrad's favourite bedside book; Conrad refers directly to what he calls Alfred Wallace's famous book on the Malay Archipelago in The Secret Agent. In his short story, Neil MacAdam, W. Somerset Maugham has the title character read The Malay Archipelago while travelling to Borneo, and its influence can be felt in the story's description of that island.

More recently, the book has influenced a number of non-fiction books including The Song of the Dodo by David Quammen (1997), which discussed Wallace's contributions to the field of island biogeography; The Spice Islands Voyage by Tim Severin (1997) that retraced Wallace's travels; and Archipelago: The Islands of Indonesia, by Gavan Daws (1999), which compared the environment described by Wallace with the modern state of the archipelago. The Malay Archipelago is considered to be one of the most influential books ever written about the Indonesian islands. It remains a resource for modern authors of works about the region such as the 2014 book Indonesia Etc, which contains multiple quotations from Wallace's book as well as recommending it as further reading on the geography of Indonesia.

The English comedian Bill Bailey travelled around Indonesia in the footsteps of Wallace for a two-part television programme on BBC Two, Bill Bailey's Jungle Hero, first broadcast in 2013, the centenary of Wallace's death.

== Bibliography ==
=== Wallace ===
Each edition was reprinted in subsequent years, so for example the tenth edition appeared in 1890, 1893, 1894, 1898, 1902, 1906 and later reprints, so many different dates can be found in library catalogues.

- Wallace, Alfred Russel (1869). The Malay Archipelago: The land of the orang–utan, and the bird of paradise. A narrative of travel, with sketches of man and nature (1 ed.). Macmillan.
  - 1872, Macmillan.
  - 1890, (10 ed.) Macmillan.
  - 2014 The Annotated Malay Archipelago by Alfred Russel Wallace, edited by John van Wyhe, NUS Press; annotated edition (15 December 2014), trade paperback, 836 pages, ISBN 978-9971698201
  - 2017, deluxe two-volume edition in slipcase with 64 colour plates published by the Folio Society.

==== Translations ====
- 1869: Der Malayische Archipel: die Heimath des Orang-Utan und des Paradiesvogels; Reiseerlebnisse und Studien über Land und Leute, George Westermann, Braunschweig. (in German, translated by Adolf Bernhard Meyer)
- 1870–71: Insulinde: het land van den orang-oetan en den paradijsvogel, P.N. van Kampen, Amsterdam. (in Dutch)
- 1870?: L'archipel malaisien: patrie de l'orang-outang et de l'oiseau de paradis: récits de voyage et étude de l'homme et de la nature, Librairie Hachette, Paris. (in French)
- 1872: Malajskij archipelag, Sanktpeterburg Obščestvennaja Pol'za, St Petersburg. (in Russian)
- 1942: 馬来諸島 (Marai shotō), 南洋協會, Nan'yō Kyōkai, Tokyo. (in Japanese)
- 1942: Viaje al archipélago malayo, Espasa-Calpe, Buenos Aires. (in Spanish)
- 1966: 馬來群島科學考察記 (Ma lai qun dao ke xue kao cha ji), 臺灣商務, Tai wan shang wu, Taipei. (in Chinese)
- 2000: Menjelajah Nusantara: ekspedisi Alfred Russel Wallace abad ke-19, Remaja Rosdakarya, Bandung. (in Indonesian)
- 2017: 말레이 제도, 지오북. (한국어)

=== Other authors ===
- Daws, Gavan (1999). Archipelago: The Islands of Indonesia – From the Nineteenth-century Discoveries of Alfred Russel Wallace to the Fate of Forests and Reefs in the Twenty-first Century. University of California Press. ISBN 978-0-52021-576-4.
- Severin, Tim (1997). The Spice Islands Voyage: The Quest for Alfred Wallace, the Man Who Shared Darwin's Discovery of Evolution. Little, Brown. ISBN 978-0-78670-721-8.
- Quammen, David (1997). The Song of the Dodo: Island Biogeography in an Age of Extinction. Simon & Schuster. ISBN 978-0-68482-712-4.
