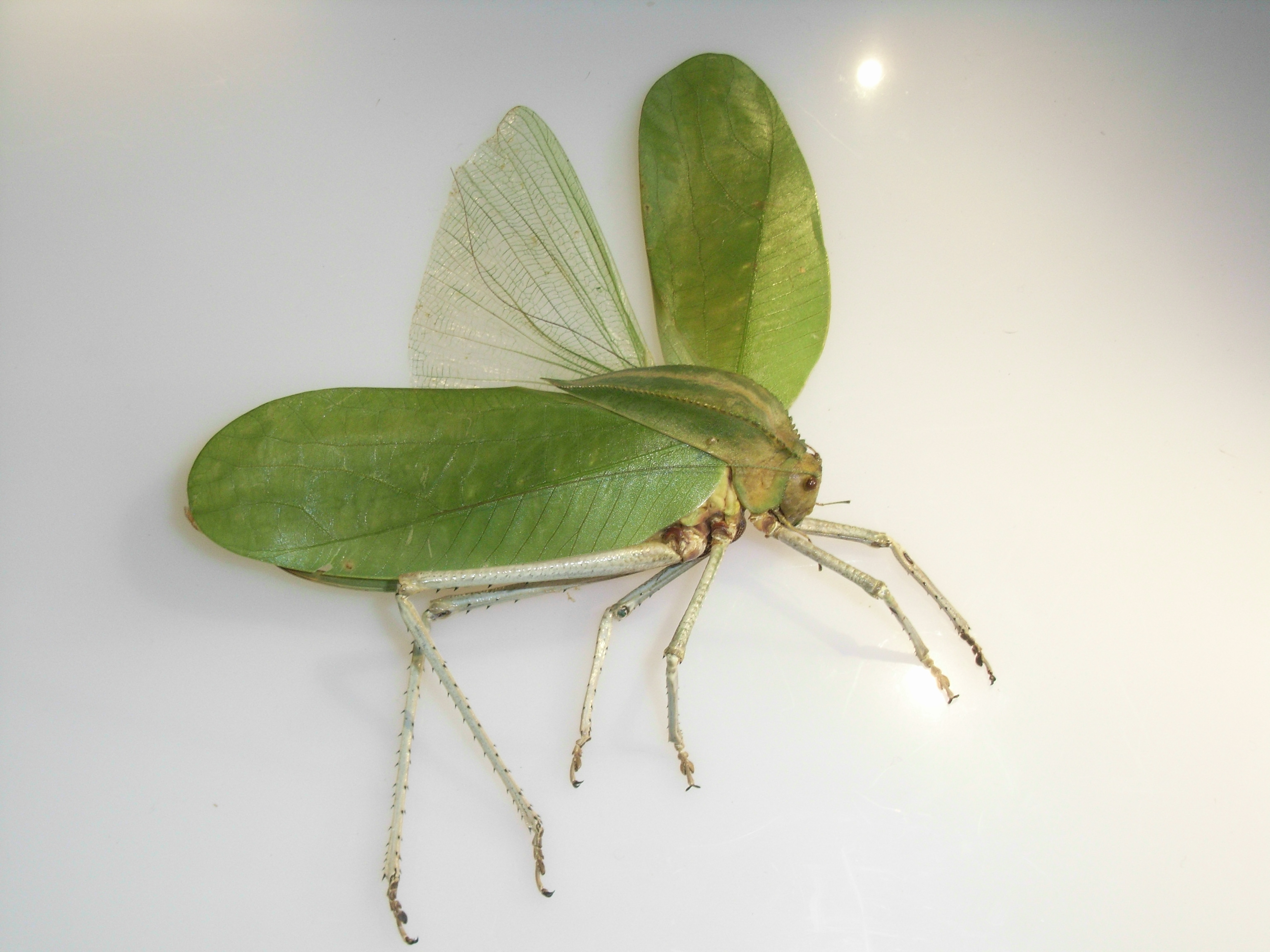
- Siliquofera grandis

Scientific classification
- Kingdom: Animalia
- Phylum: Arthropoda
- Class: Insecta
- Order: Orthoptera
- Suborder: Ensifera
- Family: Tettigoniidae
- Subfamily: Phyllophorinae; Stål, 1874

Genera
- See text

= Phyllophorinae =

Subfamily of cricket-like animals

The Phyllophorinae is a subfamily of the bush crickets or katydids, found in east Malesia to Australia (with a record from Sri Lanka).

== Genera ==
The Orthoptera Species File lists the following:

1. Hyperhomala Serville, 1831
2. Microsasima: monotypic M. stueberi de Jong, 1972
3. Parasasima: P. elegans Willemse, 1955
4. Phyllophora Thunberg, 1815
5. Phyllophorella Karny, 1924
6. Phyllophorina Karny, 1924
7. Sasima Bolívar, 1903
8. Sasimella Karny, 1924
9. Sasimoides: monotypic S. spinosissima Karny, 1924
10. Siliquofera Bolívar, 1903: S. grandis (Blanchard, 1853)
11. Siliquoferella: S.emarginata Karny, 1924
