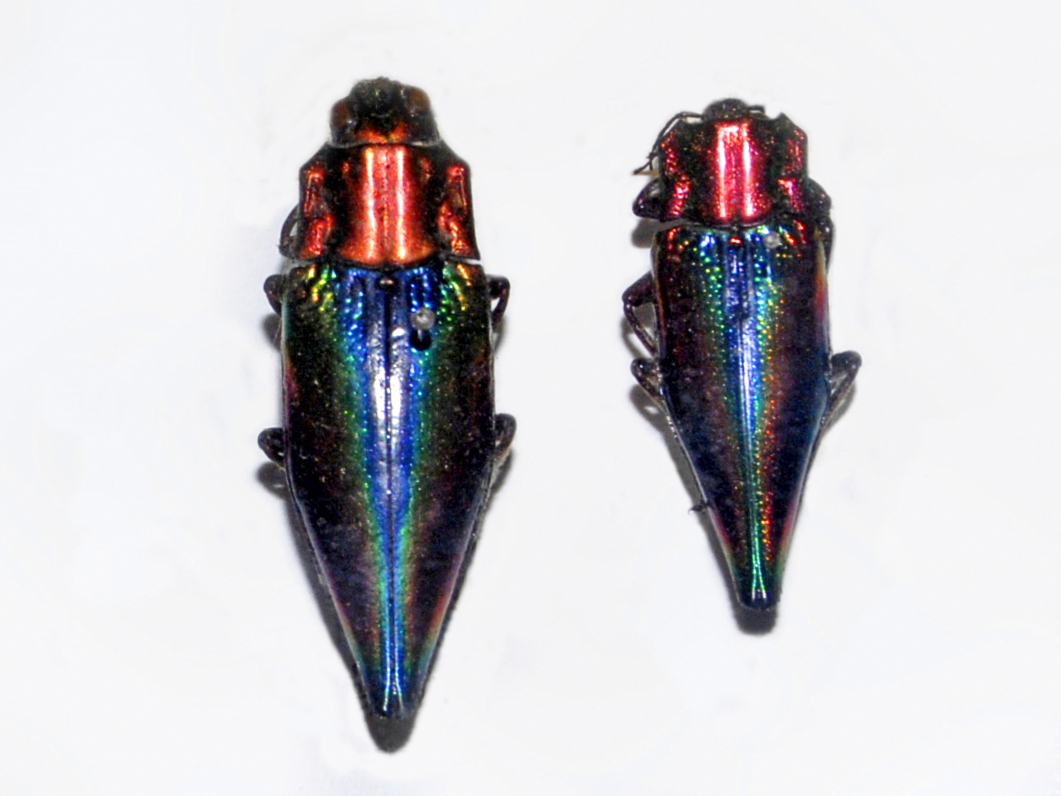
- Cyphogastra javanica.

Scientific classification
- Kingdom: Animalia
- Phylum: Arthropoda
- Class: Insecta
- Order: Coleoptera
- Suborder: Polyphaga
- Infraorder: Elateriformia
- Family: Buprestidae
- Subfamily: Chrysochroinae
- Genus: Cyphogastra; Deyrolle, 1864

= Cyphogastra =

Genus of beetles

Cyphogastra is a genus of beetles in the family Buprestidae, containing the following species:

- Cyphogastra adonis Kerremans, 1911
- Cyphogastra amatina Kerremans, 1919
- Cyphogastra angulicollis Deyrolle, 1864
- Cyphogastra apicalis Kerremans, 1895
- Cyphogastra armata Théry, 1923
- Cyphogastra aterrima Kerremans, 1911
- Cyphogastra atramentaria Kerremans, 1919
- Cyphogastra augustini Théry, 1923
- Cyphogastra auripennis Saunders, 1867
- Cyphogastra bicolor Waterhouse, 1914
- Cyphogastra biimpressa Obenberger, 1922
- Cyphogastra bruyni Lansberge, 1880
- Cyphogastra calepyga (Thomson, 1857)
- Cyphogastra canaliculata Théry, 1908
- Cyphogastra carbonaria Théry, 1908
- Cyphogastra caudata Lansberge, 1880
- Cyphogastra celebensis Kerremans, 1910
- Cyphogastra chalcea Obenberger, 1922
- Cyphogastra collarti Descarpentires, 1956
- Cyphogastra coriacea Kerremans, 1910
- Cyphogastra cribrata Deyrolle, 1864
- Cyphogastra cristovallensis (Montrouzier, 1855)
- Cyphogastra cupreofossa Kerremans, 1910
- Cyphogastra cyaniceps Kerremans, 1910
- Cyphogastra cyanipes Kerremans, 1895
- Cyphogastra diabolica Obenberger, 1917
- Cyphogastra dissimilis Kerremans, 1895
- Cyphogastra emeraldina Kerremans, 1919
- Cyphogastra farinosa (Fabricius, 1775)
- Cyphogastra flavimana Lansberge, 1880
- Cyphogastra fossifrons Kerremans, 1895
- Cyphogastra foveicollis (Boisduval, 1835)
- Cyphogastra foveolata Deyrolle, 1864
- Cyphogastra froggatti Théry, 1947
- Cyphogastra fruhstorferi Nonfried, 1894
- Cyphogastra gestroi Kerremans, 1895
- Cyphogastra gigantica Obenberger, 1916
- Cyphogastra gloriosa Gestro, 1877
- Cyphogastra haidanae Théry, 1923
- Cyphogastra herculeana Obenberger, 1917
- Cyphogastra horni Obenberger, 1924
- Cyphogastra impressipennis Gestro, 1877
- Cyphogastra intrusa Deyrolle, 1864
- Cyphogastra javanica Saunders, 1871
- Cyphogastra kampeni Théry, 1937
- Cyphogastra kerremansi Obenberger, 1926
- Cyphogastra lansbergei Thomson, 1878
- Cyphogastra lateimpressa Kerremans, 1903
- Cyphogastra longicauda Théry, 1923
- Cyphogastra longueti Théry, 1926
- Cyphogastra loriae Théry, 1923
- Cyphogastra ludekingi Obenberger, 1922
- Cyphogastra malayensis Fisher, 1930
- Cyphogastra mniszechii Deyrolle, 1864
- Cyphogastra modesta Gestro, 1876
- Cyphogastra moluccana Kerremans, 1895
- Cyphogastra nigripennis Deyrolle, 1864
- Cyphogastra nigrita Kerremans, 1898
- Cyphogastra obiensis Théry, 1923
- Cyphogastra papuana Obenberger, 1917
- Cyphogastra pistor (Laporte & Gory, 1835)
- Cyphogastra punctatissima Kerremans, 1895
- Cyphogastra punctulata Kerremans, 1919
- Cyphogastra quadrivittata Carter, 1916
- Cyphogastra satrapa (Schönherr, 1817)
- Cyphogastra semipurpurea (Laporte & Gory, 1835)
- Cyphogastra similis Kerremans, 1919
- Cyphogastra simplex Kerremans, 1919
- Cyphogastra simplicissima Obenberger, 1926
- Cyphogastra stephensae Bellamy, 2004
- Cyphogastra strandi Obenberger, 1922
- Cyphogastra sulcipennis Gestro, 1877
- Cyphogastra taitina Kerremans, 1919
- Cyphogastra tayauti Guérin-Méneville, 1847
- Cyphogastra terminata Waterhouse, 1885
- Cyphogastra tevorensis Obenberger, 1922
- Cyphogastra tinianica Kurosawa, 1953
- Cyphogastra toxopeusi Obenberger, 1932
- Cyphogastra tuberculata Thomson, 1878
- Cyphogastra uxorismeae Holynski, 1994
- Cyphogastra ventricosa (Olivier, 1790)
- Cyphogastra viridis Kerremans, 1898
- Cyphogastra wallacei Deyrolle, 1864
- Cyphogastra waterhousei Théry, 1926
- Cyphogastra wollastoni Waterhouse in Arrow, et al., 1915
- Cyphogastra woodlarkiana (Montrouzier, 1855)
