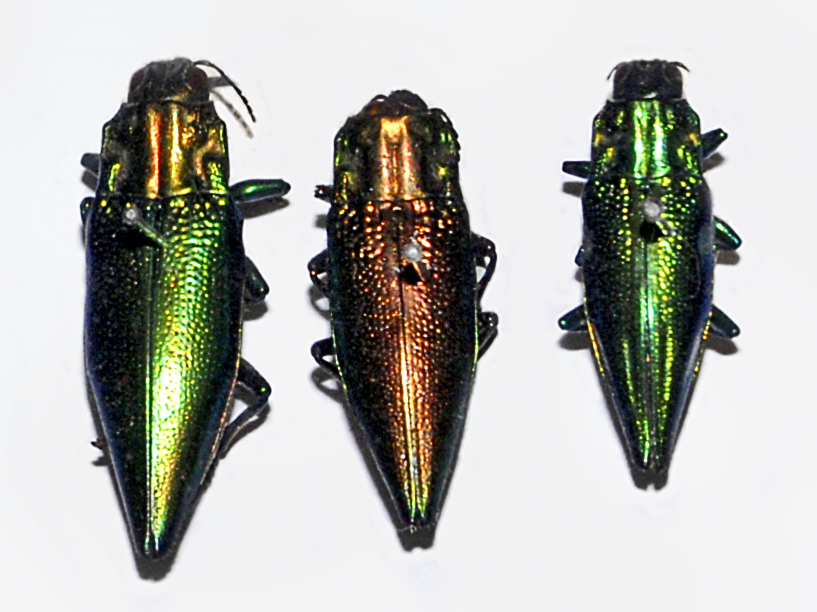
- Mounted specimen

Scientific classification
- Kingdom: Animalia
- Phylum: Arthropoda
- Class: Insecta
- Order: Coleoptera
- Suborder: Polyphaga
- Infraorder: Elateriformia
- Family: Buprestidae
- Genus: Cyphogastra
- Species: C. foveicollis

Binomial name
- Cyphogastra foveicollis (Boisduval, 1835)

Synonyms
- Buprestis foveicollis Boisduval, 1835; Cyphogastra pisciformis Deyrolle, 1864; Cyphogastra geelwinkiana Gestro, 1877; Cyphogastra flavitarsis Gestro, 1877; Cyphogastra ronensis Lansberge, 1880; Cyphogastra pygmaea Kerremans, 1903; Cyphogastra aurifossa Obenberger, 1922; Cyphogastra bipartita Théry, 1923

= Cyphogastra foveicollis =

Species of beetle

Cyphogastra foveicollis is a species of jewel beetle in the family Buprestidae, subfamily Chrysochroinae, and tribe Chrysochroini. It was originally described as Buprestis foveicollis by Boisduval in 1835 from specimens collected during the voyage of the Astrolabe in the Pacific. It is the type species of the genus Cyphogastra. The species is native to West Papua in the New Guinean region.

== Taxonomy ==
Cyphogastra foveicollis was first described by Boisduval in 1835 under the name Buprestis foveicollis, based on material collected during Jules Dumont d'Urville's 1826–1829 expedition aboard the corvette Astrolabe through the Pacific. The species was subsequently transferred to the genus Cyphogastra when Henri Deyrolle erected that genus in 1864 in his monograph on the Buprestidae of the Malay Archipelago, based on specimens collected by Alfred Russel Wallace. Bellamy subsequently designated C. foveicollis as the type species of Cyphogastra in 1998.

The species has accumulated numerous synonyms over its taxonomic history, reflecting the difficulty of delimiting species in this morphologically variable genus. These include C. pisciformis Deyrolle, 1864, C. geelwinkiana Gestro, 1877, C. flavitarsis Gestro, 1877, C. ronensis Lansberge, 1880, C. pygmaea Kerremans, 1903, C. aurifossa Obenberger, 1922, and C. bipartita Théry, 1923.

The genus Cyphogastra belongs to the subtribe Chalcophorina within the tribe Chrysochroini. It comprises three subgenera: Cyphogastra s.str., Guamia Théry, 1930, and Pleiona Deyrolle, 1864. The genus name derives from the Greek kyphos (κυφός, "hump" or "convex") and gaster (γαστήρ, "belly"), referring to the convex abdominal profile characteristic of the group. Hołyński has published an ongoing multi-part revision of the Cyphogastra supergenus beginning in 2016, organising species into morphologically defined "circles".

== Description ==
Cyphogastra foveicollis reaches approximately 30 millimetres (1.2 in) in length. The body is elongate and robust, typical of the genus. The basic colour of the elytra and thorax is metallic dark green or dark purplish. As in other Buprestidae, this metallic iridescence results from structural coloration rather than pigments; the cuticle contains multilayer reflectors consisting of stacked chitin layers that selectively reflect specific wavelengths of light, producing colours that shift depending on the viewing angle. Multilayer reflectors are the most widespread iridescence mechanism in beetles and are especially prevalent in Buprestidae.

The species epithet foveicollis refers to the pitted or foveate pronotum (from the Latin fovea, "pit", and collis, referring to the neck or collar), a diagnostic character of the genus.

== Biology ==
Like other members of Buprestidae, C. foveicollis is a wood-boring beetle whose larvae are xylophagous. Buprestid larvae, known as flatheaded borers due to their characteristically flattened anterior body segments, typically feed within the wood, bark, or pith of their host plants. Adults of the family are generally diurnal and are often found on the surfaces of their host plants, where their metallic coloration may serve as camouflage among sunlit foliage, or function in mate recognition. Specific host plant associations and life history details for C. foveicollis have not been documented, though buprestid larvae in general develop in weakened or dead trees, and some species have multi-year larval development periods.

== Distribution ==
Cyphogastra foveicollis occurs in West Papua, in the Indonesian portion of New Guinea. The genus Cyphogastra as a whole is distributed across the Indo-Pacific, with its greatest diversity centred on the New Guinean region and the surrounding Malesian islands, extending to Melanesia, the Moluccas, and the Mariana Islands.
