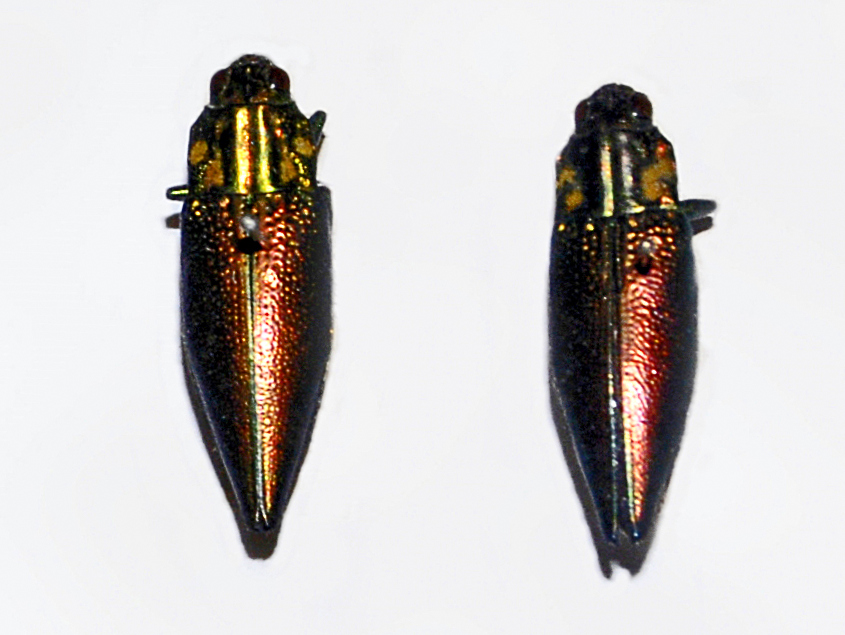
- Mounted specimen

Scientific classification
- Kingdom: Animalia
- Phylum: Arthropoda
- Clade: Pancrustacea
- Class: Insecta
- Order: Coleoptera
- Suborder: Polyphaga
- Infraorder: Elateriformia
- Family: Buprestidae
- Genus: Cyphogastra
- Species: C. semipurpurea

Binomial name
- Cyphogastra semipurpurea (Laporte & Gory, 1835)

= Cyphogastra semipurpurea =

Species of beetle

Cyphogastra semipurpurea is a beetle of the Buprestidae family. It is Endemic to Timor

== Subspecies ==
- Cyphogastra semipurpurea rollei Théry, 1908
- Cyphogastra semipurpurea romanensis Théry, 1926
- Cyphogastra semipurpurea rothschildi Kerremans, 1911
- Cyphogastra semipurpurea semipurpurea (Laporte & Gory, 1835)
- Cyphogastra semipurpurea wetteriana Théry, 1935

== Description ==
Cyphogastra semipurpurea reaches about 30 millimetres (1.2 in) in length. The basic colour of the elytra is metallic dark purplish, while the thorax is yellowish.

== Distribution ==
This species occurs in Timor and nearby islands
