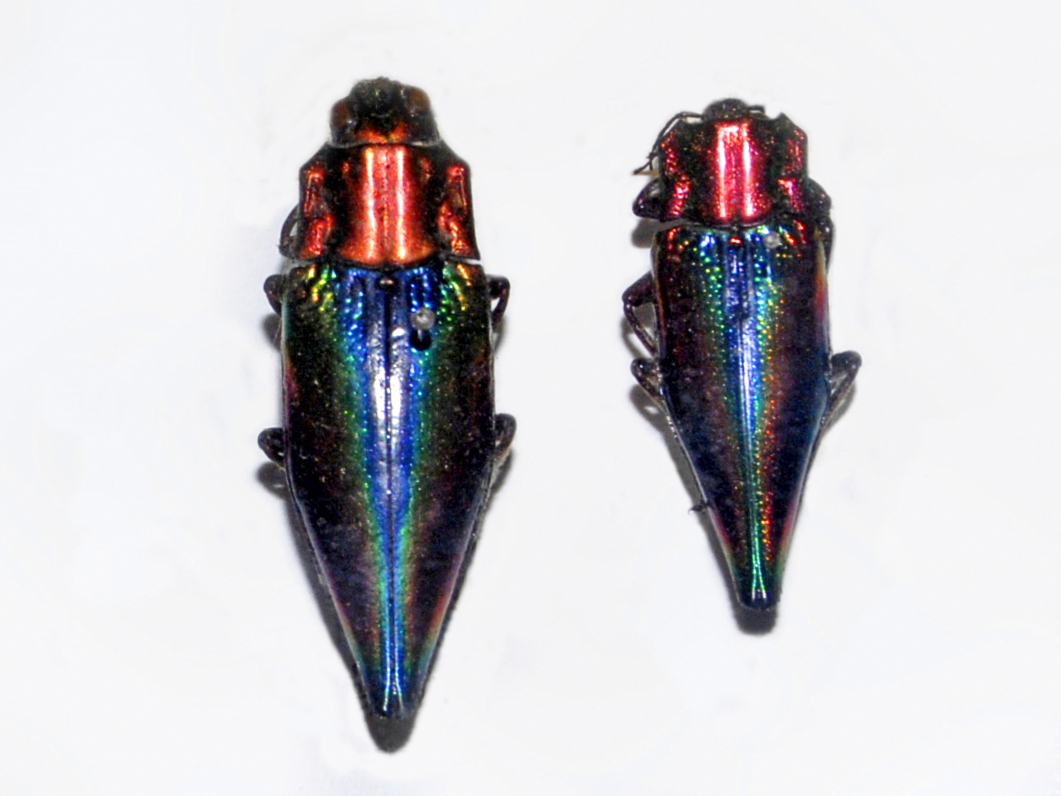
- Mounted specimen

Scientific classification
- Kingdom: Animalia
- Phylum: Arthropoda
- Clade: Pancrustacea
- Class: Insecta
- Order: Coleoptera
- Suborder: Polyphaga
- Infraorder: Elateriformia
- Family: Buprestidae
- Genus: Cyphogastra
- Species: C. javanica

Binomial name
- Cyphogastra javanica Saunders, 1871

= Cyphogastra javanica =

Species of beetle

Cyphogastra javanica is a beetle of the Buprestidae family.

== Description ==
Cyphogastra javanica reaches about 30–40 millimetres (1.2–1.6 in) in length. The basic colour of the elytra is metallic dark blue, while the thorax and the head are metallic reddish.

== Distribution ==
This species occurs in Indonesia.
