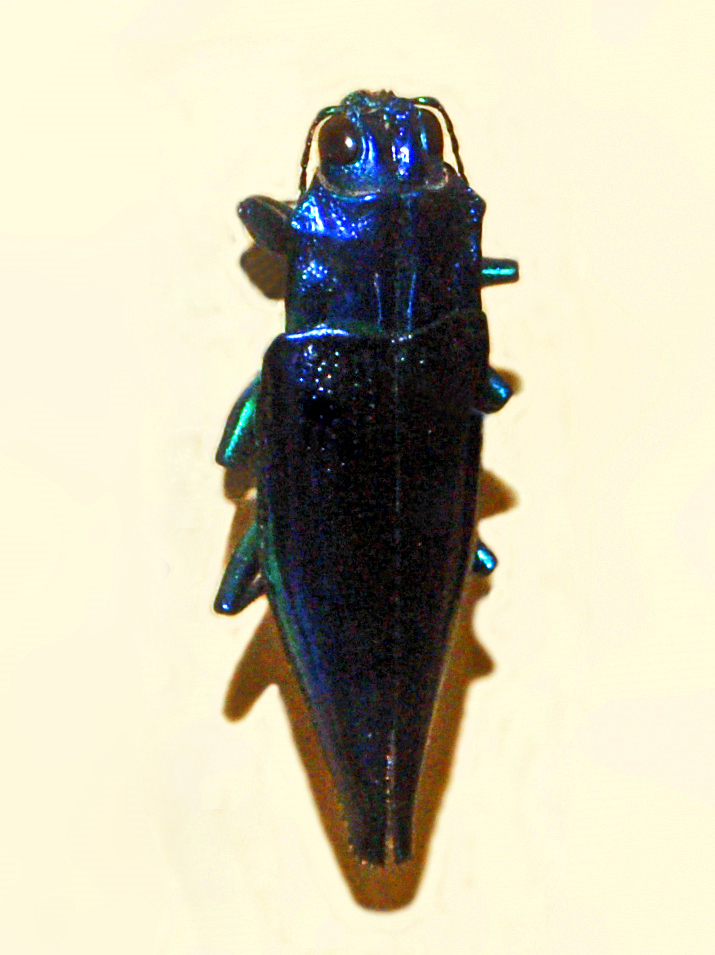
- Cyphogastra calepyga from Kei Island (Indonesia).

Scientific classification
- Kingdom: Animalia
- Phylum: Arthropoda
- Clade: Pancrustacea
- Class: Insecta
- Order: Coleoptera
- Suborder: Polyphaga
- Infraorder: Elateriformia
- Family: Buprestidae
- Genus: Cyphogastra
- Species: C. calepyga

Binomial name
- Cyphogastra calepyga (Thomson, 1857)

= Cyphogastra calepyga =

Species of beetle

Cyphogastra calepyga is a beetle of the Buprestidae family.

== Description ==
Cyphogastra calepyga reaches about 25–40 millimetres (0.98–1.57 in) in length. The basic colour is metallic dark blue, with green reflections.

== Distribution ==
This species is indigenous to the Kai Islands of Indonesia.
