= Phyllophora (katydid) =

Scientific classification
- Domain: Eukaryota
- Kingdom: Animalia
- Phylum: Arthropoda
- Class: Insecta
- Order: Orthoptera
- Suborder: Ensifera
- Family: Tettigoniidae
- Subfamily: Phyllophorinae
- Genus: Phyllophora; Thunberg, 1815

Synonyms
- Phillophora Montrouzier, 1855

Genus of cricket-like animals

External image
- Image at iNaturalist

Phyllophora is a genus of large bush crickets typical of the subfamily Phyllophorinae. Species have been recorded from: Sri Lanka, peninsular Malaysia, Malesia and Australia.

== Species ==
The Orthoptera Species File lists:

1. Phyllophora acuminata Karny, 1924
2. Phyllophora aequifolia Karny, 1924
3. Phyllophora angustata Brunner von Wattenwyl, 1898
4. Phyllophora bidentata Karny, 1924
5. Phyllophora bispinosa Karny, 1924
6. Phyllophora boschmai de Jong, 1964
7. Phyllophora brunnea Kirby, 1899
8. Phyllophora cheesmanae de Jong, 1972
9. Phyllophora dubia Karny, 1924
10. Phyllophora eburneiguttata Kirby, 1899
11. Phyllophora erosifolia Karny, 1924
12. Phyllophora filicerca Karny, 1924
13. Phyllophora guttata Karny, 1924
14. Phyllophora heurnii Karny, 1924
15. Phyllophora horvathi Blatchley, 1903
16. Phyllophora inusta de Jong, 1946
17. Phyllophora karnyi Kästner, 1933
18. Phyllophora keyica Brunner von Wattenwyl, 1898
19. Phyllophora laminata Karny, 1924
20. Phyllophora longicerca Karny, 1924
21. Phyllophora media Walker, 1870
22. Phyllophora ovalifolia Kirby, 1899
23. Phyllophora papuana Kästner, 1933
24. Phyllophora parvidens Karny, 1924
25. Phyllophora pellucida Karny, 1924
26. Phyllophora picta Karny, 1924
27. Phyllophora retroflexa Karny, 1924
28. Phyllophora similis de Jong, 1972
29. Phyllophora speciosa Thunberg, 1815 - type species
