= Lady of the Mountain =

National personification of Iceland

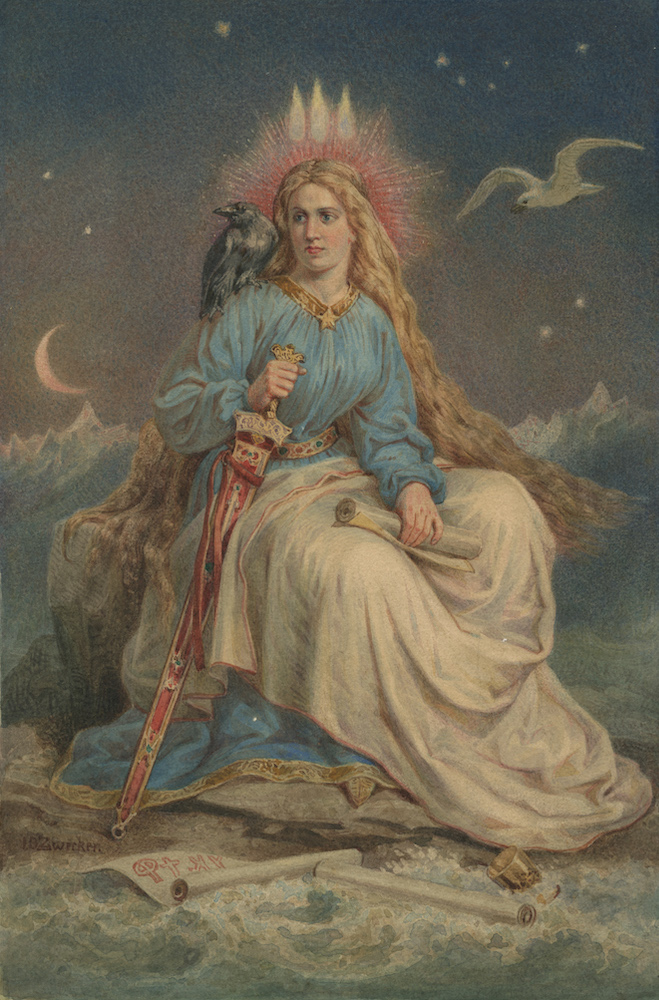
Watercolour of the Lady of the Mountain, 1864, by Johann Baptist Zwecker. Now in Aberystwyth University School of Art Museum.

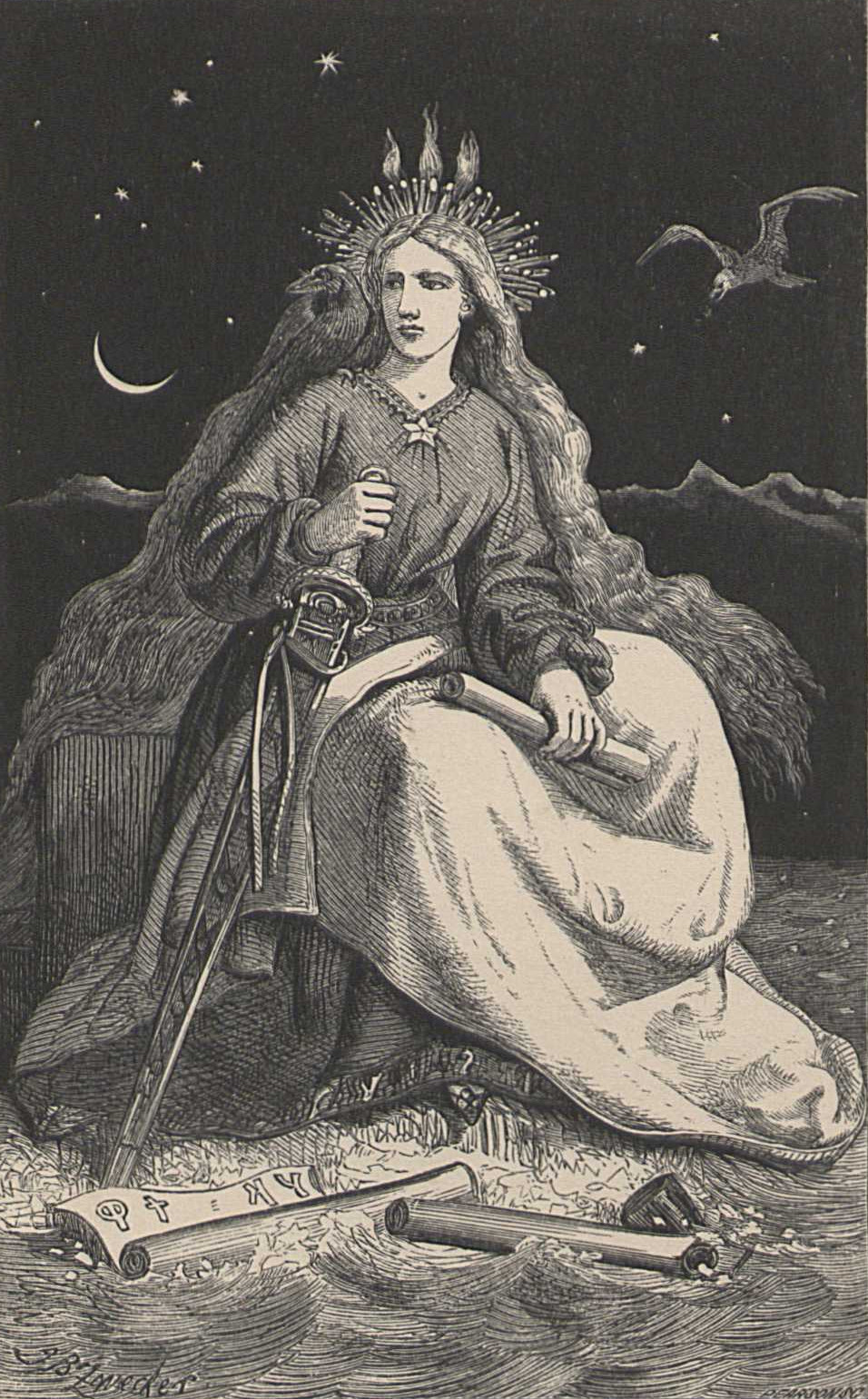
Wood engraving of the Lady of the Mountain, copied by Zwecker from his original watercolour, and published in Icelandic Legends (1866)

The Lady of the Mountain (Icelandic: fjallkonan) is the female incarnation (national personification) of Iceland.

== History in Iceland ==
The personification of a nation as a woman was widespread in eighteenth- and nineteenth-century Europe. The earliest image of Iceland personified as a woman seems to have appeared first in association with the poem Ofsjónir við jarðarför Lovísu drottningar 1752 ('Visions at the funeral of Queen Louise, 1752') by Eggert Ólafsson (1752), but this image does not survive.

The word fjallkonan is attested for the first time in the poem Eldgamla Ísafold by Bjarni Thorarensen from the first decade of the nineteenth century. From that moment onwards the Lady of the Mountain became a well-known symbol in Icelandic poetry.

An image of Lady of the Mountain was published in the last volume of an English translation of Icelandic folk-tales by Eiríkur Magnússon and G. E. J. Powell, Icelandic Legends, Collected by Jón Arnason (1864–66). It is the work of the German painter Johann Baptist Zwecker, who drew it to specifications provided by Eiríkur. Eiríkur described the picture in a letter to Jón Sigurðsson (11 April 1866) thus:

The picture of the woman is to represent Iceland, thus she has a crown of ice on her head, from which fires erupt. On her shoulder is the raven, Iceland's most characteristic bird, Óðinn's ancient friend and the favourite of poets, a great and knowledgeable carrier of news. Over the seas flutters a seagull, but across the surf of time and history are borne rune-staves to the land and up into the embrace of the woman, and she has picked one of them up. This is intended as a symbol of our land of literature and history. It is night, with a starry sky and the moon up. Behind are mountains, moonlight on the ridges.

Also very popular is the image designed by Benedikt Gröndal on a memorial card of the national holiday in 1874.

The idea of the Lady of the Mountain as motherland was a counterweight to the idea of the Danish King as "father" in nineteenth-century Iceland under Danish rule. After independence in 1944, it became one of the images through which feminism and the idea of powerful women, such as Iceland's first female president Vigdís Finnbogadóttir, were made to seem a natural part of Icelandic culture.

=== Icelandic National Day celebration ===
Since the establishment of the Icelandic republic in 1944 it has been traditional for a woman to play the role of the Lady of the Mountain during the Icelandic National Day celebrations (17 June). The woman chosen for the role is typically a well-known actress or an otherwise notable individual. She is dressed in skautbúningur (the national costume) and presents herself to read a single poem.

In 2019, actress Aldís Amah Hamilton was named Lady of the Mountain.

=== In popular culture ===
The Lady of the Mountain appeared on the cover of the Sólstafir last album, Endless Twilight of Codependent Love.

== History in Canada ==
The image of the Lady of the Mountain has also been prominent among Vestur Íslendingar in Canada. A woman dressed as the Lady of the Mountain first appeared at the Iceland Days in Winnipeg, Manitoba, Canada in 1924. There too, the Lady of the Mountain has been deployed to promote feminism.
