= KOLD =

KOLD or Kold may refer to:

- KOLD-FM, a radio station (91.9 FM) licensed to serve Cold Bay, Alaska, United States; see List of radio stations in Alaska
- KOLD-TV, a television station (PSIP channel 13/RF 32) licensed to Tucson, Arizona, United States
- the ICAO code for Old Town Municipal Airport and Seaplane Base, in Old Town, Maine, United States
- Köld, the third album by the Icelandic metal band Sólstafir
