= Endless Twilight of Codependent Love =

Studio album by Sólstafir
- Released: November 6, 2020
- Recorded: 2020
- Genre: Post-metal; progressive metal; extreme metal; black metal
- Length: 63:00
- Language: Icelandic; English ("Her Fall from Grace")
- Label: Season of Mist
- Producer: Birgir Jón Birgirsson

Sólstafir chronology
Berdreyminn (2017)	Endless Twilight of Codependent Love (2020)	Hin Helga Kvöl (2024)

Singles from Endless Twilight of Codependent Love
- 1. "Akkeri" Released: August 5, 2020; 2. "Drýsill" Released: September 4, 2020; 3. "Her Fall from Grace" Released: October 3, 2020

Professional ratings
Review scores
Source	Rating
Metal Hammer	4.5/5 stars
Sputnikmusic	4.4/5

Endless Twilight of Codependent Love is the seventh studio album by Icelandic post-metal band Sólstafir. It was released on November 6, 2020 through the record label Season of Mist, and streamed two days early on YouTube. The album cover is a reproduction of a painting by Johann Baptist Zwecker of the Lady of the Mountain, the female personification of Iceland.

Metal Hammer named it as the 34th best metal album of 2020.

== Track listing ==
All lyrics are written by Sólstafir; all music is composed by Sólstafir.

No.	Title	Length
1.	"Akkeri"	10:10
2.	"Drýsill"	8:52
3.	"Rökkur"	7:07
4.	"Her Fall from Grace"	6:35
5.	"Dionysus"	5:30
6.	"Til Moldar"	4:31
7.	"Alda Syndanna"	4:30
8.	"Or"	7:00
9.	"Úlfur"	8:45
Total length:		63:00

Deluxe edition box set bonus songs
No.	Title	Length
10.	"Hrollkalda Þoka Einmanaleikans"	6:39
11.	"Hann Fór Sjálfur"	8:09
Total length:		77:48

== Personnel ==
Sólstafir

- Aðalbjörn Tryggvason – guitar, vocals
- Sæþór M. Sæþórsson – guitar
- Svavar Austmann – bass
- Hallgrímur J. Hallgrímsson – drums, backing vocals

Additional personnel

- Birgir Jón Birgirsson – production

== Charts ==
Chart performance for Endless Twilight of Codependent Love
Chart (2020)	Peak position
Austrian Albums (Ö3 Austria)	48
Belgian Albums (Ultratop Flanders)	195
Belgian Albums (Ultratop Wallonia)	96
Finnish Albums (Suomen virallinen lista)	24
German Albums (Offizielle Top 100)	23
Swiss Albums (Schweizer Hitparade)	39
