= Ótta =

Studio album by Sólstafir
- Released: August 29, 2014
- Recorded: December 2013 – January 2014
- Studio: Sundlaugin, Mosfellsbær, Iceland; Tube Mastering, Hertfordshire, England, UK
- Genre: Post-metal; post-rock; post-black metal
- Length: 57:17
- Language: Icelandic
- Label: Season of Mist
- Producer: Birgir Jón Birgirsson; Aðalbjörn Tryggvason

Sólstafir chronology
Svartir Sandar (2011)	Ótta (2014)	Berdreyminn (2017)

Professional ratings
Review scores
Source	Rating
Exclaim!	8/10
Metal Storm	8.3/10
PopMatters	7/10 stars

Ótta (an old appellation for the time from 3 to 6 am) is the fifth studio album by Icelandic post-metal band Sólstafir. It was released on August 29, 2014, through the record label Season of Mist. The tracks of the album represent the traditional Icelandic times of the day.

== Track listing ==
All lyrics are written by Sólstafir; all music is composed by Sólstafir.

No.	Title	Translation	Length
1.	"Lágnætti"	"Midnight", lit. "Low Night"	8:44
2.	"Ótta"	"Dead of Night" (Note: The title track is partly a pun. The lyrics contain við ótta, which could only mean 'with dread'. Also, this word sounds extremely similar to átta, 'eight', possibly for the eight tracks on the album.)	9:38
3.	"Rismál"	"Dayrise", lit. "Sunrise-time"	4:24
4.	"Dagmál"	"Morning", lit. "Daytime"	5:39
5.	"Miðdegi"	"Midday"	4:18
6.	"Nón"	"Noon"	7:47
7.	"Miðaftann"	"Mid Evening"	5:39
8.	"Náttmál"	"Nighttime"	11:15
Total length:			57:17

Tilberi bonus disc
No.	Title	Length
1.	"Tilberi"	6:31
2.	"Til Valhallar"	4:30
3.	"Ótta" (Elevator Mix)	8:56

== Personnel ==
Writing, performance and production credits are adapted from the album liner notes.

Sólstafir

- Aðalbjörn Tryggvason – guitar, vocals, production
- Sæþór Maríus Sæþórsson – guitar
- Svavar Austmann – bass
- Guðmundur Óli Pálmason – drums

Additional musicians

- Hrafn Thoroddsen – hammond organ on "Náttmál"
- Halldór Á. Björnsson – piano
- Bjarni M. Sigurðarson – banjo
- Amiina – strings
- Hildur Ársælsdóttir – strings
- Sólrún Sumarliðadóttir – strings
- María Huld Markan Sigfúsdóttir – strings

Additional personnel

- Birgir Jón Birgirsson – production, mixing
- Silli Geirdal – co-production
- Níels Adolf Svansson – assistant engineering
- Andy Jackson – mastering
- Ragnar Axelsson – photography

== Charts ==
Chart	Peak position
Austrian Albums (Ö3 Austria)	65
Finnish Albums (Suomen virallinen lista)	2
German Albums (Offizielle Top 100)	25
Swiss Albums (Schweizer Hitparade)	64
UK Rock & Metal Albums (OCC)	34
