= E. W. Robinson =

British painter

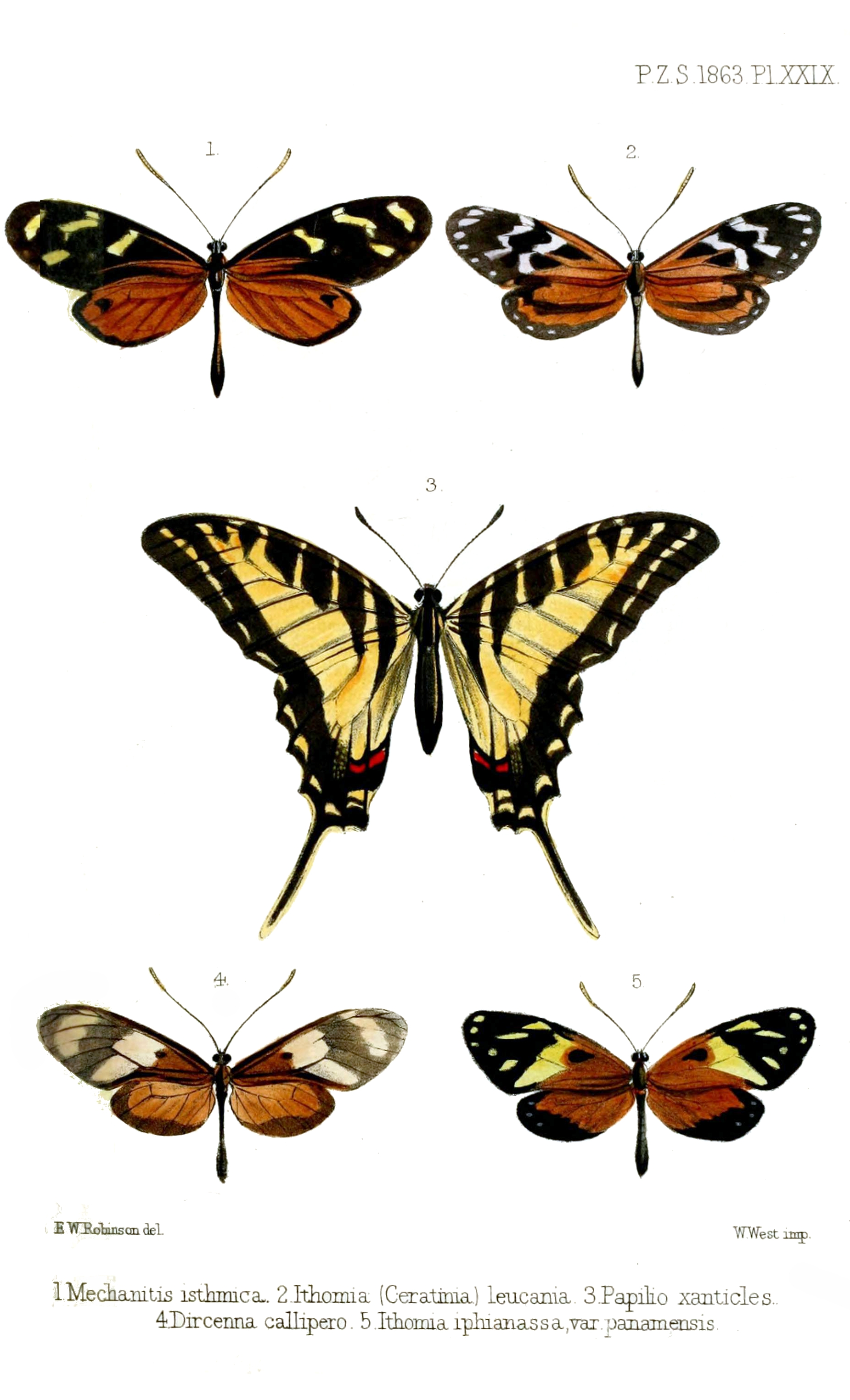
Butterflies from Panama, including Dark Zebra Swallowtail (center). Proceedings of the Zoological Society of London (vol. 1863, plate XXIX)

Edward William Robinson (1824–1883), usually known as E.W. Robinson, was a nineteenth-century British School artist and illustrator of natural history books such as Alfred Russel Wallace's The Malay Archipelago and Henry Walter Bates's The Naturalist on the River Amazons.

== Life and career ==
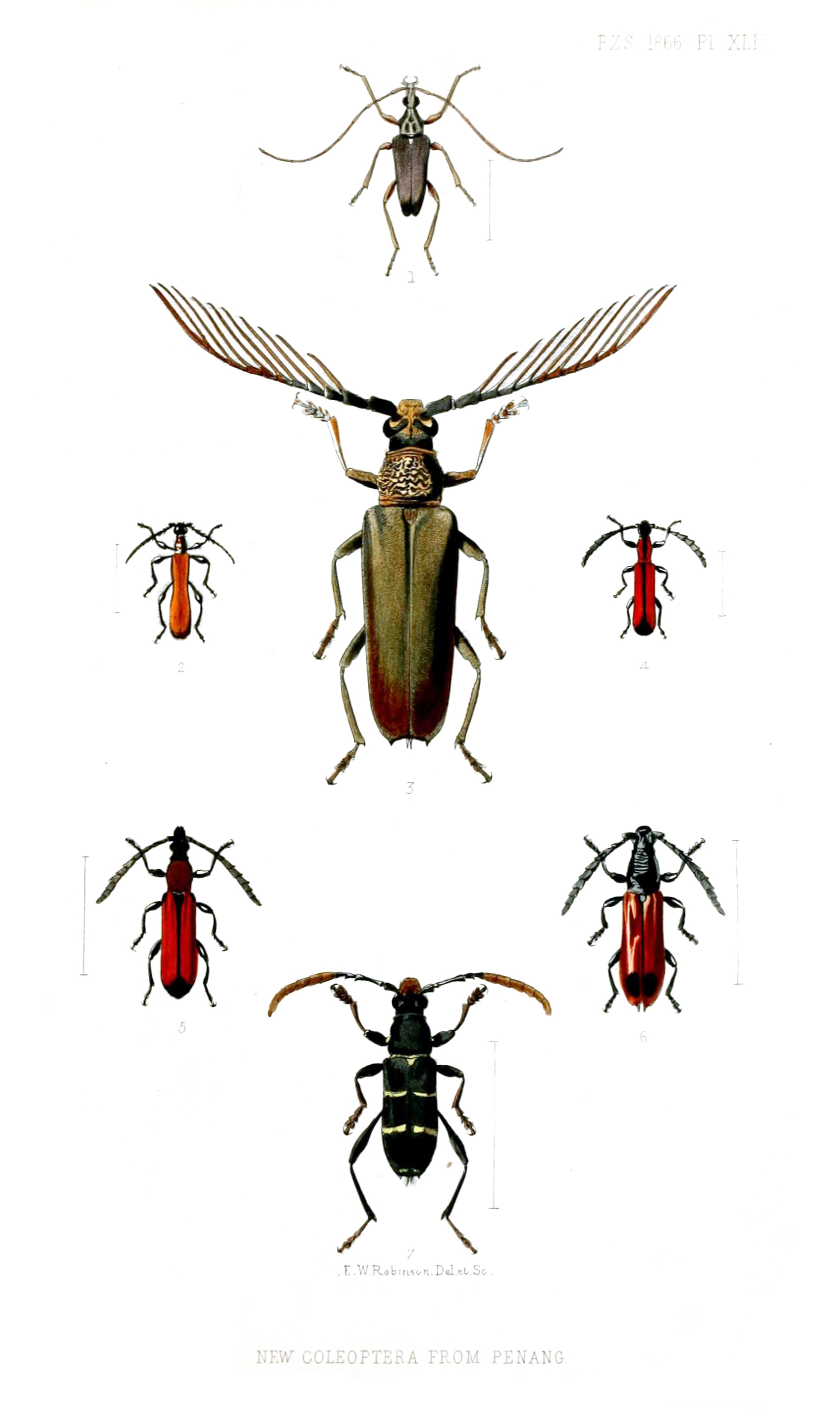
Longhorn beetles from Penang: Proceedings of the Zoological Society of London vol. 1866, plate XLII

Robinson initially worked mainly in engraving, both drawing ("del") and engraving ("sc") the plates. With the decline in engraving caused by photography, Robinson moved into painting in watercolour and other media. In 1866 Robinson exhibited a number of watercolours at the Suffolk Street Exhibition in London including one painting entitled 'A Mill Pond' (Catalogue entry 1017 which sold for £9-9-). He was a relative, most likely the nephew, and pupil of the artist and engraver John Henry Robinson (1796–1871). In some cases the men worked together, as on the engraving of the bust of William Shakespeare, where it is recorded "E.W. Robinson del [drawing]; H. Robinson sc [engraving]". He produced a wide range of work including coloured plates for the Proceedings of the Zoological Society of London.

== Works illustrated by Robinson ==
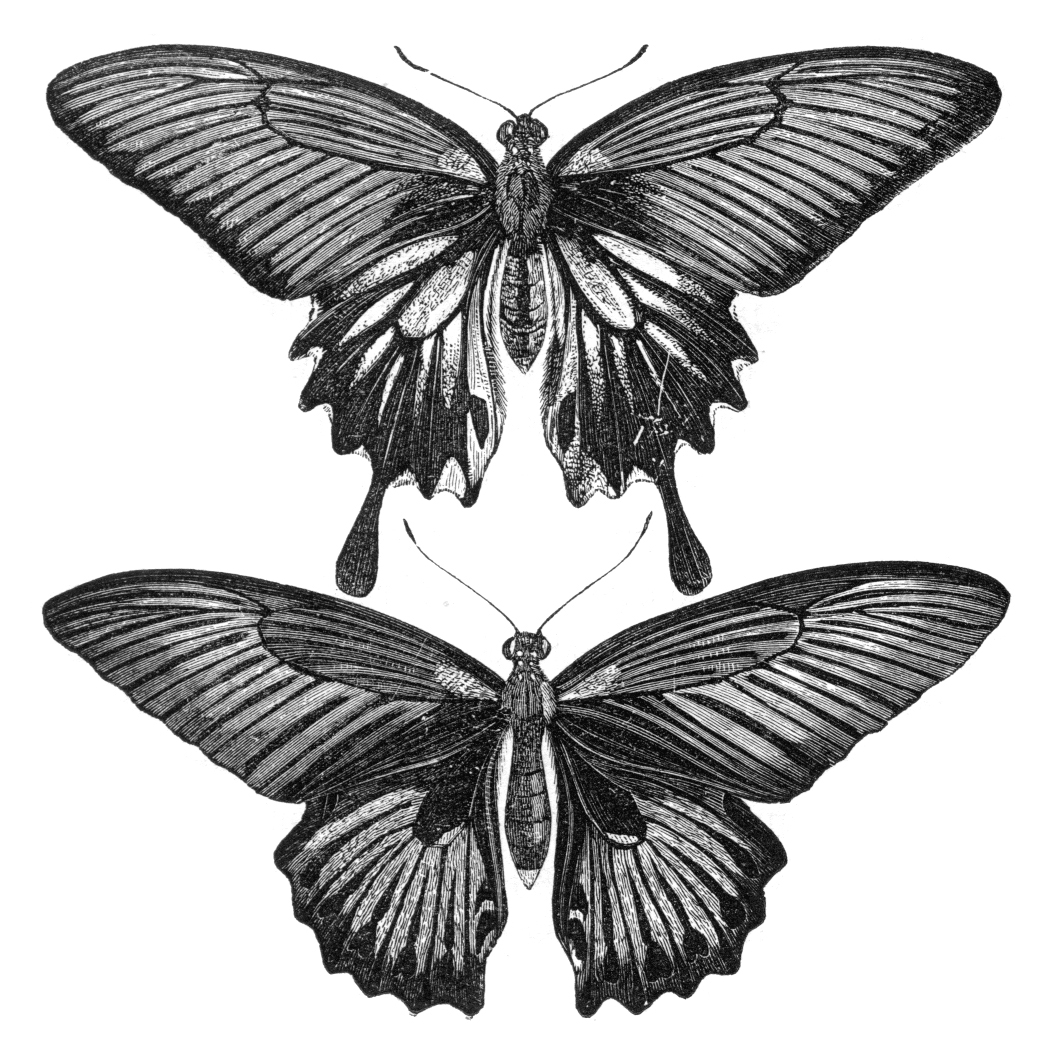
Females of Papilio memnon" illustration for The Malay Archipelago

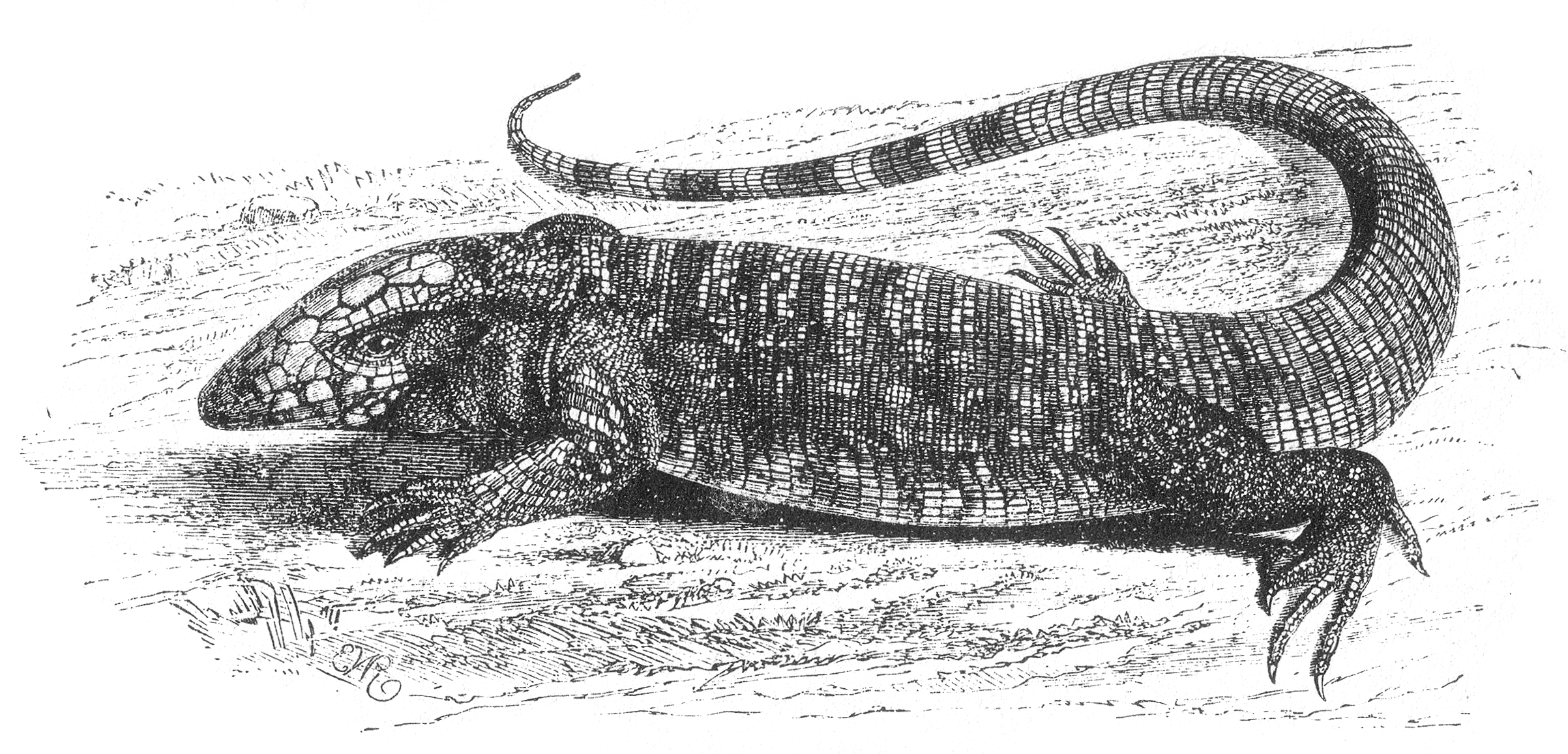
"The Jacuarú (Teius teguexim)" in The Naturalist on the River Amazons, figure 19

- Rye, E. C. (1866) British Beetles: an introduction to the study of our indigenous coleoptera, Lovell Reeve.
- Shuckard, W. E. (1866) British bees : an introduction to the study of the natural history and economy of the bees indigenous to the British Isles, Lovell Reeve.
- Stainton, H.T. (1867) British Butterflies and Moths: an introduction to the study of our native lepidoptera. Lovell Reeve.
- Melliss, John Charles (1875) St Helena: A physical, historical and topographical description of the island, including its geology, fauna, flora, and meteorology. Lovell Reeve. "E.W. Robinson, lith[ography]" for 7 plates of geological features and 5 plates of fauna.
