= Berdreyminn =

Studio album by Sólstafir
- Released: May 26, 2017
- Recorded: November – December 2016
- Studio: Sundlaugin, Mosfellsbær, Iceland; Orgone studios, Woburn, England, UK; Sterling Sound Studios, New York City, NY, USA
- Genre: Post-rock; post-metal; hard rock
- Length: 57:22
- Language: Icelandic
- Label: Season of Mist
- Producer: Birgir Jón Birgisson; Jaime Gómez Arellano; Aðalbjörn Tryggvason

Sólstafir chronology
Ótta (2014)	Berdreyminn (2017)	Endless Twilight of Codependent Love (2020)

Professional ratings
Review scores
Source	Rating
Metal Hammer	4/5 stars
Metal Injection	9/10

Berdreyminn is the sixth studio album by Icelandic post-metal band Sólstafir. It was released on May 26, 2017, through the record label Season of Mist.

== Track listing ==
All lyrics are written by Sólstafir; all music is composed by Sólstafir.

No.	Title	Translation	Length
1.	"Silfur-refur"	"Silver Fox"	6:54
2.	"Ísafold"	"Ice World", "Icy Ground"	4:58
3.	"Hula"	"Mist", "Veil"	7:07
4.	"Nárós"	"Lifeless Rose"	7:22
5.	"Hvít sæng"	"White Bed"	7:22
6.	"Dýrafjörður"	a fjord in the Westfjords of Iceland	7:31
7.	"Ambátt"	"Handmaid"	8:08
8.	"Bláfjall"	"Blue Mountain"	8:00
Total length:			57:22

Deluxe edition box set bonus songs
No.	Title	Translation	Length
9.	Untitled (no audio)		1:00
10.	"Svart Blóð"	"Black Blood"	4:49
11.	"Samband Í Berlin"	"Connection in Berlin"	4:22
Total length:			67:32

== Personnel ==
Writing, performance and production credits are adapted from the album liner notes.

Sólstafir

- Aðalbjörn Tryggvason – guitar, vocals, production
- Sæþór M. Sæþórsson – guitar
- Svavar Austmann – bass
- Hallgrímur J. Hallgrímsson – drums, backing vocals

Additional musicians

- Snorri Sigurðarson – trumpet, flugelhorn
- Ingi Garðar Erlendsson – trombone, tuba
- Erna Ómarsdóttir – French horn
- Halldór Á. Björnsson – piano, keyboards
- Amiina – strings
- Margrét Soffía Einarsdóttir – soprano vocals on "Hula"

Additional personnel

- Birgir Jón Birgirsson – production
- Jaime Gómez Arellano – production, mixing
- Ted Jensen – mastering
- Adam Burke – cover art
- Steinunn Lilja Draumland – photography
- Hippografix – layout
- Jo Geirdal – handwriting, raven

== Charts ==
Chart	Peak position
Austrian Albums (Ö3 Austria)	35
Belgian Albums (Ultratop Wallonia)	136
Finnish Albums (Suomen virallinen lista)	20
French Albums (SNEP)	166
German Albums (Offizielle Top 100)	30
Swiss Albums (Schweizer Hitparade)	42
