= Svartir Sandar =

Svartir sandar

Studio album by Sólstafir
- Released: October 14, 2011
- Recorded: May 2011
- Studio: Studio Sundlaugin
- Genres: Post-metal; post-rock
- Length: 77:37
- Label: Season of Mist
- Producers: Aðalbjörn Tryggvason; Fredrik Reinedahl

Sólstafir chronology
| Köld (2009) | Svartir sandar (2011) | Ótta (2014) |

Professional ratings
Review scores
| Source | Rating |
|---|---|
| Lords of Metal | (95/100) |
| Thrash Hits | (6/6) |

Svartir sandar is the fourth studio album by Icelandic post-metal band Sólstafir. It was released on October 14, 2011, by Season of Mist. A music video for the song "Fjara" was made in July 2011 and released in January 2012.

== Track listing ==
Disc 1 (Andvari)
| No. | Title | English translation | Length |
|---|---|---|---|
| 1. | "Ljós í stormi" | Lights in a Storm | 11:35 |
| 2. | "Fjara" | Beach | 6:44 |
| 3. | "Þín orð" | Your Words | 6:13 |
| 4. | "Sjúki skugginn" | The Sick Shadow | 5:07 |
| 5. | "Æra" | Honour | 5:02 |
| 6. | "Kukl" | Humbug | 5:08 |
| Total length: | | | 39:49 |

Disc 2 (Gola)
| No. | Title | English translation | Length |
|---|---|---|---|
| 1. | "Melrakkablús" | Prairie Hound Blues | 9:58 |
| 2. | "Draumfari" | Dream Tripper | 3:40 |
| 3. | "Stinningskaldi" | Strong Breeze | 1:15 |
| 4. | "Stormfari" | Storm Tripper | 3:37 |
| 5. | "Svartir sandar" | Black Sands | 8:22 |
| 6. | "Djákninn" | The Deacon | 10:51 |
| Total length: | | | 37:43 |

== Personnel ==
Sólstafir

- Aðalbjörn Tryggvason – guitars, vocals, production
- Sæþór Maríus Sæþórsson – guitars
- Svavar Austmann – bass
- Guðmundur Óli Pálmason – drums, percussion

Additional musicians

- Gunnar Ben – arranging, conducting
- Halldór A. Björnsson – keyboards, electric piano
- Jón Björn Rikharðsson – gong
- Steinar Sigurðsson – saxophone
- Gerður G. Bjarklind – spoken word
- Hallgrímur Jón Hallgrímsson – male backing vocals
- Ragnheiður Eiriksdottir – female backing vocals

Additional personnel

- Fredrik Reinedahl – production, mixing
- Birgir Jón Birgisson and Elizabeth Carlsson – engineering
- Göran Finnberg – mastering
