= Köld =

Studio album by Sólstafir
- Released: January 21, 2009
- Recorded: December 2007
- Studio: Music A Matic Studios, Gothenburg, Sweden
- Genre: Post-metal; progressive metal
- Length: 70:35
- Label: Spinefarm
- Producer: Fredrik Reinedahl; Aðalbjörn Tryggvason

Sólstafir chronology
Masterpiece of Bitterness (2005)	Köld (2009)	Svartir Sandar (2011)

Köld is the third studio album by Icelandic post-metal band Sólstafir. It was released on January 21, 2009 through Spinefarm Records. The cover art was done by Guðmundur Óli Pálmason. It was recorded in Gothenburg and all the songs are in English, except the title song "Köld".

In December 2019, Sólstafir performed a five-date European tour to celebrate the 10th anniversary of Köld's release.

== Critical reception ==
In a March 2009 review, Arnar Eggert Thoroddsen of Morgunblaðið gave the record 4 stars out of 5, calling it a "Freezing cold beauty". In October 2009, Flosi Þorgeirsson of Reykjavík Grapevine stated that it was"Definitely one of the best Icelandic albums of the year".

== Track listing ==
No.	Title	Length
1.	"78 Days in the Desert"	8:34
2.	"Köld"	8:59
3.	"Pale Rider"	8:05
4.	"She Destroys Again"	7:12
5.	"Necrologue"	8:30
6.	"World Void of Souls"	11:51
7.	"Love Is the Devil (And I Am in Love)"	4:43
8.	"Goddess of the Ages"	12:41
Total length:		70:35
