= Sólstafir =

Icelandic post-metal band

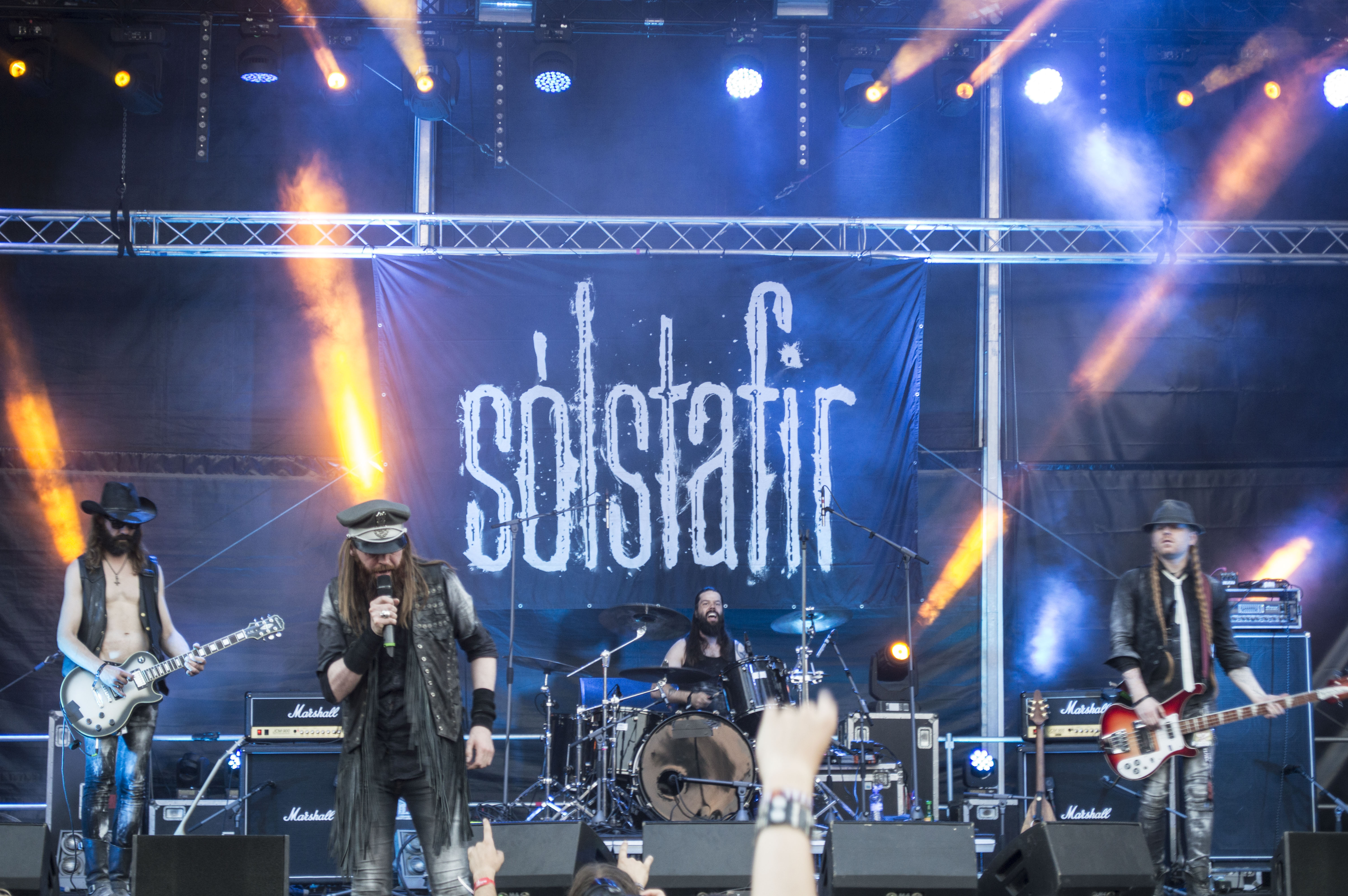
- Sólstafir at Brutal Assault 2015

Background information
- Origin: Iceland
- Genres: Post-metal; post-rock; black metal
- Years active: 1995–present
- Labels: Century Media; Season of Mist; Spinefarm; Ars Metalli
- Members: Aðalbjörn "Addi" Tryggvason; Sæþór Maríus "Pjúddi" Sæþórsson; Svavar "Svabbi" Austmann; Hallgrímur Jón "Grimsi" Hallgrímsson
- Past members: Halldór Einarsson; Guðmundur Óli "Gummi" Pálmason
- Website: solstafir.net

Sólstafir is an Icelandic post-metal band formed in 1995 and currently signed to Century Media. Originally a black metal band, they transitioned to a post-metal-influenced style with traces of their earlier sound.

== History ==
Guitarist/singer Aðalbjörn Tryggvason, bassist Halldór Einarsson, and drummer Guðmundur Óli Pálmason formed Sólstafir in 1995. The band's name is Icelandic for sun beams (crepuscular rays). They recorded the demos Í Norðri and Til Valhallar. Halldór left the band, and Aðalbjörn and Guðmundur recorded a promo tape in 1997.

During this period, bassist Svavar Austmann joined the band, and they began recording their debut full-length album, Í Blóði og Anda. The album was released in 2002 due to recording delays and label disputes. Shortly after completing the album, second guitarist Sæþór Maríus Sæþórsson joined the band and debuted on the 2002 demo Black Death.

After shopping around a three-track demo, Sólstafir signed with Spinefarm Records in 2005. The labe released their second album, Masterpiece of Bitterness, later that year. The album received positive reviews. Metal Storm stated, "the perfect mix of non-Metal elements with metal ones makes it a necessary album for any Metalhead looking for something that breaks the mold of pre-established genres."

They recorded their third album, Köld, in Sweden, and released it in 2009. Reviewers compared the band's sound to Enslaved and Neurosis, among others, while noting their post-black metal sound. The album was noted for its atmospheric passages. Sólstafir toured Europe regularly in 2010, and made their first of many open-air appearances at the Roskilde Festival that year.

Sólstafir released their fourth album, Svartir Sandar, on Season of Mist in 2011. The song "Fjara" remained in the 2013 list of Iceland's top 100 songs of 20 years. This album retreated from black metal and move toward experimental atmospherics reminiscent of Sigur Rós.

Season of Mist released their fifth album, Ótta, in 2014. It was noted for experimental elements like strings and piano. The band released three official music videos, and performed on Stúdíó A, for Iceland's national television channel, RÚV.

In January 2015, the band announced that drummer Guðmundur Óli Pálmason left the band for "personal reasons". Pálmason tweeted that he had been "stonewalled by ex-bandmates" and that Aðalbjörn Tryggvason forced him out of the band. Hallgrímur Jón Hallgrímsson replaced Pálmason. After his departure, Pálmason formed post metal band Katla.

Sólstafir released their sixth album, Berdreyminn, in May 2017 on Season of Mist. Upon release, Berdreyminn entered international charts, mostly top 50, across Europe.

On 6 November 2020, Sólstafir released their seventh album, Endless Twilight of Codependent Love.

In early 2023, the band supported Katatonia on tour.

== Members ==
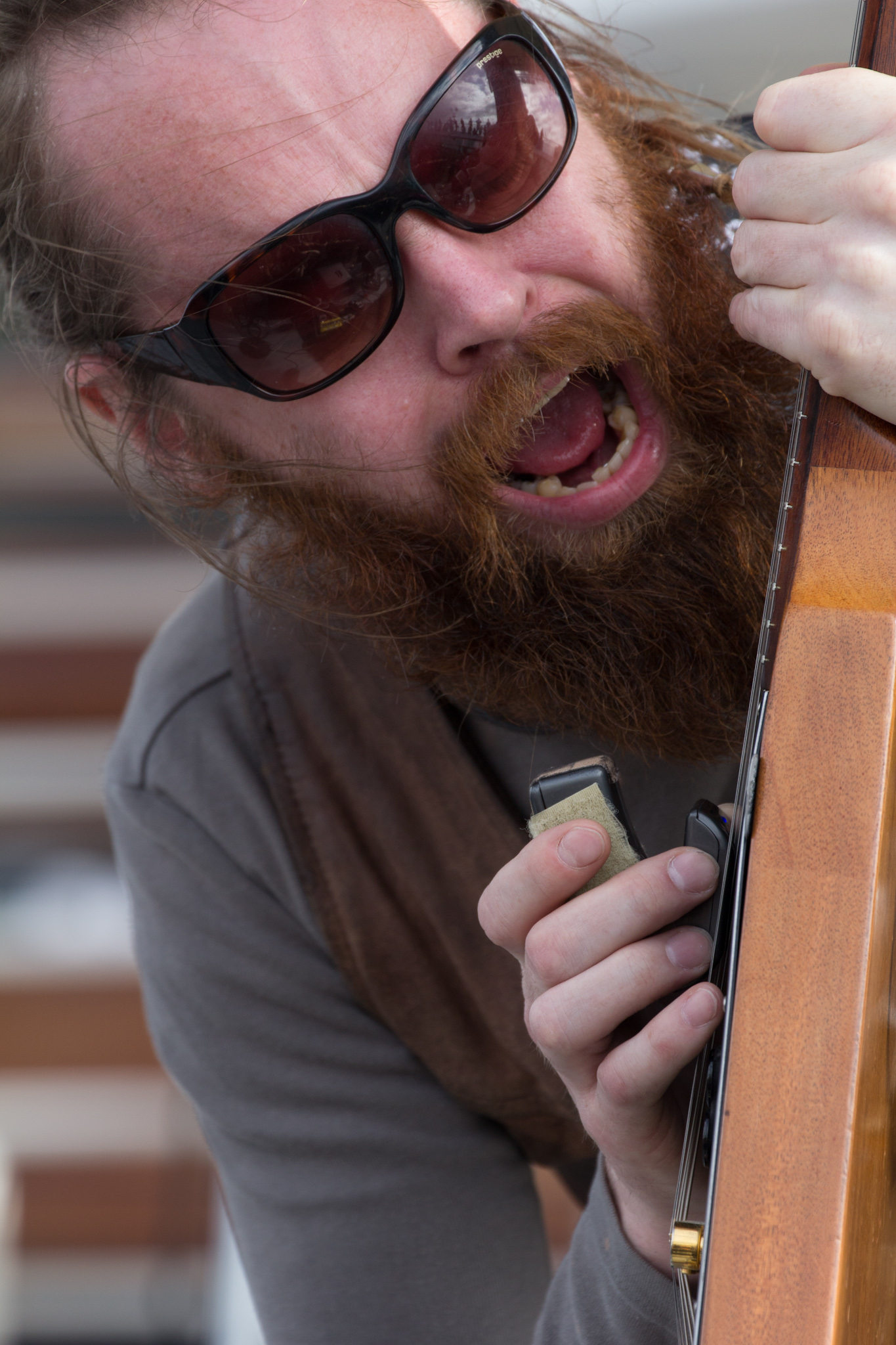
Aðalbjörn Tryggvason on the Barge to Hell 2012

=== Current members ===
- Aðalbjörn "Addi" Tryggvason – guitar, vocals (1995–present)
- Svavar "Svabbi" Austmann – bass (1999–present)
- Sæþór Maríus "Pjúddi" Sæþórsson – guitar (2002–present)
- Hallgrímur Jón "Grimsi" Hallgrímsson – drums (2015–present, on touring hiatus 2023–2024), backing vocals (2020–present)

=== Former members ===
- Halldór Einarsson – bass (1995–1997)
- Guðmundur Óli Pálmason – drums (1995–2015)

=== Former touring members ===
- Ari "Sneakers/Strigaskór" Steinarsson – drums (2015, 2023–2024)
- Kristján Einar Guðmundsson – drums (2024)

== Discography ==
=== Studio albums ===
- Í Blóði og Anda, 2002 (Ars Metalli)
- Masterpiece of Bitterness, 2005 (Spinefarm Records)
- Köld, 2009 (Spinefarm Records)
- Svartir Sandar, 2011 (Season of Mist)
- Ótta, 2014 (Season of Mist)
- Berdreyminn, 2017 (Season of Mist)
- Endless Twilight of Codependent Love, 2020 (Season of Mist)
- Hin Helga Kvöl, 2024 (Century Media)

=== EPs ===
- Til Valhallar (EP), 1996
- Black Death (EP), 2002
- Ótta (Radio Edit) + Til Valhallar (EP), 2014
- Ótta Sampler EP / Bonus: Live at Hellfest 2014 (EP), 2014
- Tilberi (EP), 2016
- Silfur-Refur (EP), 2017

=== Demos ===
- Í Norðri (demo), 1995
- Promo Tape September 1997 (demo), 1997
- Black Death (demo), 2001
- Promo 2004 (demo), 2004

=== Singles ===
- 2011: "Fjara"
- 2012: "Æra"
- 2013: "Þín orð"
- 2014: "Ótta"
- 2024: "Hin Helga Kvöl"
- 2024: "Hún andar"

=== Splits/compilations ===
- "Fire & Ice - An Icelandic Metal Compilation" (Compilation), 1997
- "Fjara/Runaway Train" (Split with Legend), 2014
