= Johann Baptist Zwecker =

German painter

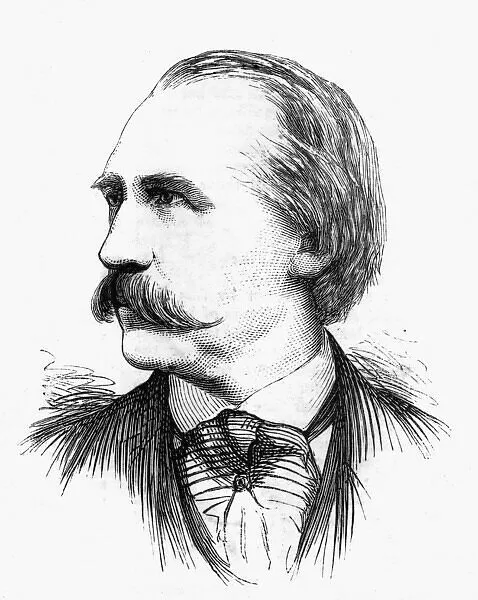
Johann Baptist Zwecker

Johann Baptist Zwecker (1814–1876) was a German illustrator of books and magazines.

== Life and work ==
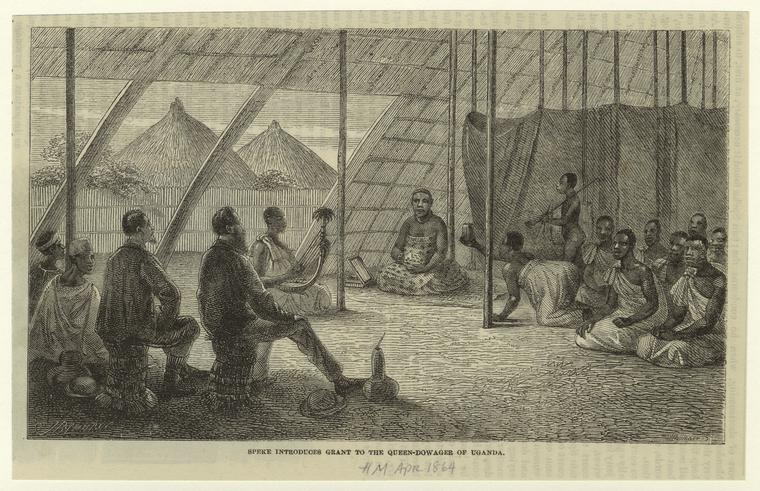
'Speke introduces Grant to the Queen-Dowager of Uganda', Harper's Magazine, April 1864

Zwecker studied art in Düsseldorf and Frankfurt, Germany. Around 1860 he set up a studio in London with Joseph Wolf.

He illustrated children's books including Hans Christian Andersen's The Ice-Maiden (Richard Bentley, 1863), as well as tales of adventure such as African Hunting and Adventure... by William Charles Baldwin. He also worked for magazines. He is however best known for his artwork for natural history books including Alfred Russel Wallace's The Geographical Distribution of Animals. His greatest work was to illustrate John George Wood's Popular Natural History (Routledge, 1871) in three volumes.

Among his works are The Hartebeest, 1862; Arrival at the Depôt at Cooper's Creek, 1862; Ostrich Hunting, 1862; and A Race for Life in a Jungle, 1862. He produced the first surviving image of the Icelandic Fjallkonan ('lady of the mountains').

== Works illustrated by Zwecker ==
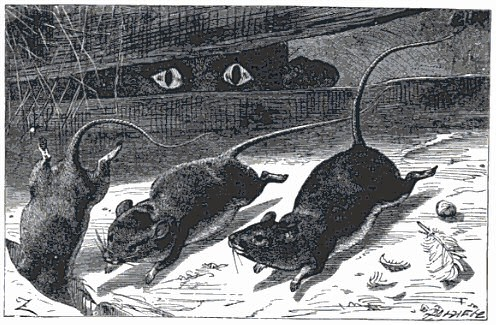
"Three Little Mice", from J. W. Elliott, Nursery Rhymes And Nursery Songs, 1870.

- Hans Christian Andersen, Anne S. Bushby, The Ice-Maidens, 1863.
- Samuel White Baker, Godefroy Durand, Ismailïa. A narrative of the expedition to Central Africa for the suppression of the slave trade, 1874.
- William Charles Baldwin, James Wolf, African Hunting from Natal to the Zambesi including Lake Ngami, the Kalahari Desert, etc from 1852 to 1860, 1863
- Robert Michael Ballantyne, The Wild Man of the West, 1863.
- Lucy D. Sale Barker, Some of my Feathered and Four-footed Friends, 1883.
- Alfred Walter Bayes, Our Favourite Nursery Rhymes, 1868.
- Grantley F. Berkeley, The English Sportsman in the Western Prairies, 1861.
- Anne Bowman, The Young Nile-Voyagers, 1868.
- Alfred Wilks Drayson, Among the Zulus, the Adventures of Hans Sterk, 1879.
- J. W. Elliott, Nursery Rhymes And Nursery Songs, 1870.
- Thomas Frost, Saved From the Wreck, 1874.
- George Alfred Henty, Out on the Pampas, or The Young Settlers, 1870. (Note: This was the first children's book written by G. A. Henty. The four main characters are named after his own children. It was published in 1870, even though the title page says 1871, a common marketing tactic for children's books at the time.)
- Edward Howe, The Boys in the Bush, 1869.
- Mary Howitt, A Treasury of Tales for Young People, 1860.
- Alfred Russel Wallace, The Geographical Distribution of Animals, 1876.
- John George Wood, Joseph Wolf, Natural History Picture Book for Children, 1861.
- John George Wood, George French Angas, Joseph Wolf, The Natural History of Man, 1868.
- John George Wood, Edward Alfred Smith, Insects Abroad, 1874.

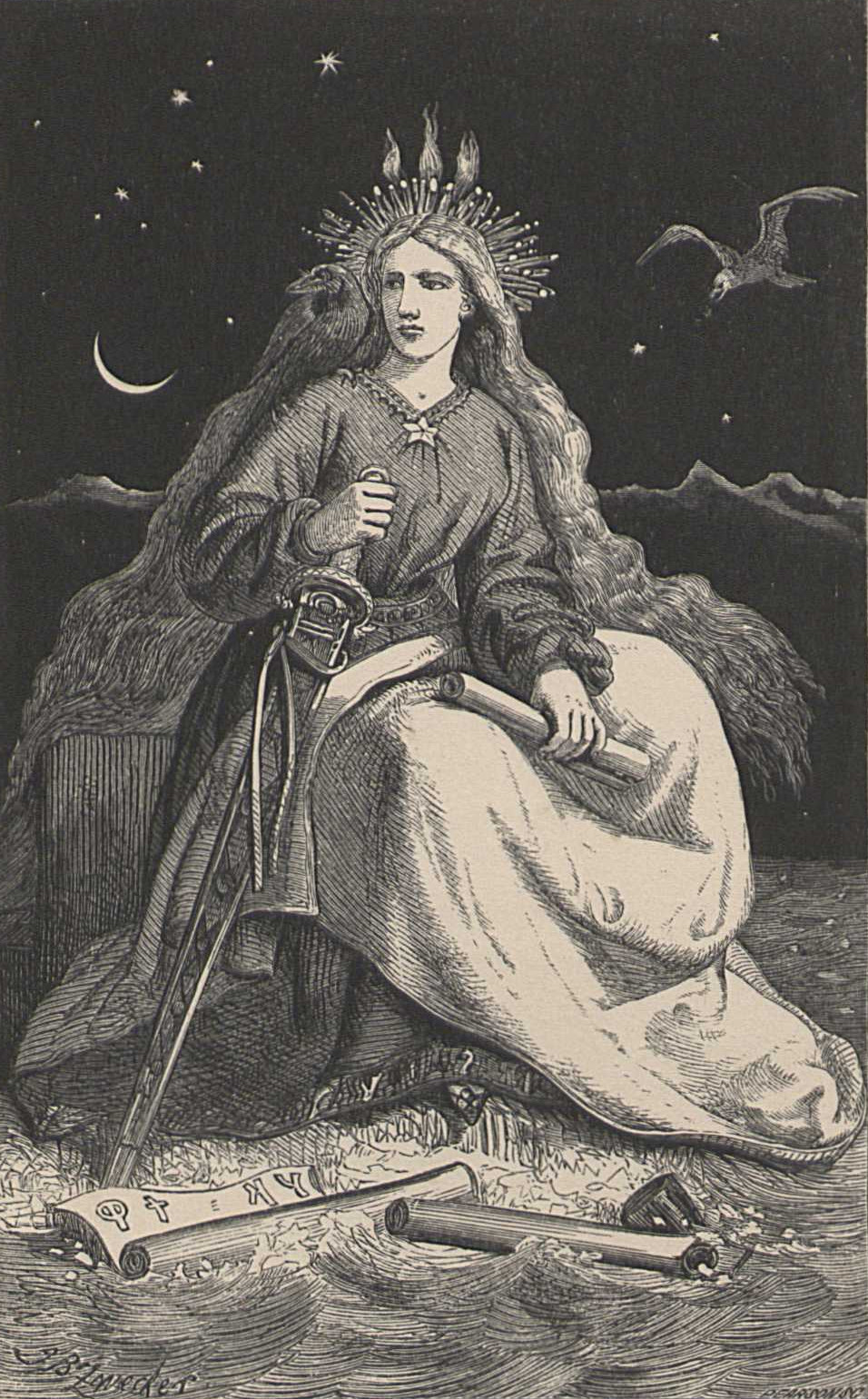
"The lady of the mountain" (Fjallkonan), a symbol of Iceland, frontispiece to Jón Árnason's Icelandic Legends, 1866
