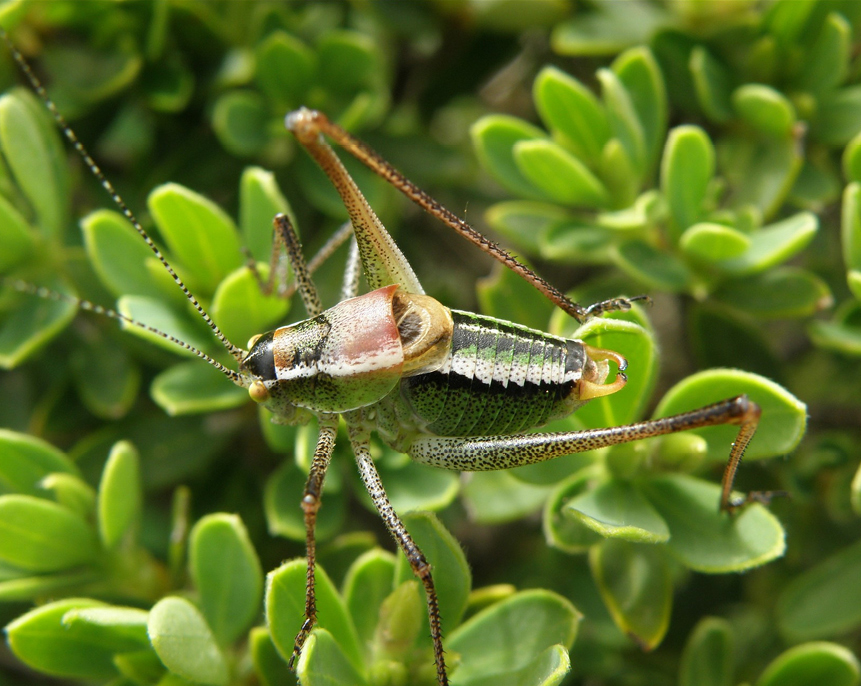
- Pictured on Daphne bushes, Mount Cithaeron, 2017.

Scientific classification
- Kingdom: Animalia
- Phylum: Arthropoda
- Clade: Pancrustacea
- Class: Insecta
- Order: Orthoptera
- Suborder: Ensifera
- Family: Tettigoniidae
- Subfamily: Phaneropterinae
- Tribe: Barbitistini
- Genus: Poecilimon
- Species: P. propinquus

Binomial name
- Poecilimon propinquus Brunner von Wattenwyl, 1878

= Poecilimon propinquus =

Species of katydid

Poecilimon propinquus is a species of leaf katydid endemic to southeastern Greece.

== Classification ==
The species was described under its present name by Carl Brunner von Wattenwyl in 1878, in his Monographie der Pheneropteriden. The type specimen is stored at the Naturhistorisches Museum Wien, with the type coming from Hymettus. P. propinquus is part of the eponymous Poecilimon propinquus group, a monophyletic clade of Poecilimon species endemic to Greece.

== Distribution ==
In his original description, von Wattenwyl noted it was found at Parnassus, Athens, and Syra. It is now understood to be distributed in much of southeastern Greece: at Kymi and Chalcis on the island of Euboea; through most of Attica, including Athens; in the northeastern Peloponnese region, around Corinth and Galatás; in inland Phthiotis and in Boeotia around Mount Cithaeron; and the islands of Makronisos, Alonnisos, and Aegina. The katydids can be found living on plants of the genera Daphne, Euphorbia (spurge), Platanus (plane trees), Sanguisorba (burnet), and Verbascum (mullein).
