= Phasmodes jeeba =

Conservation status
- Vulnerable (IUCN 2.3)

Scientific classification
- Kingdom: Animalia
- Phylum: Arthropoda
- Class: Insecta
- Order: Orthoptera
- Suborder: Ensifera
- Family: Tettigoniidae
- Genus: Phasmodes
- Species: P. jeeba

Binomial name
- Phasmodes jeeba Rentz, 1994

Species of cricket-like animal

Phasmodes jeeba is a species of insect in family Tettigoniidae. It is endemic to Australia.
