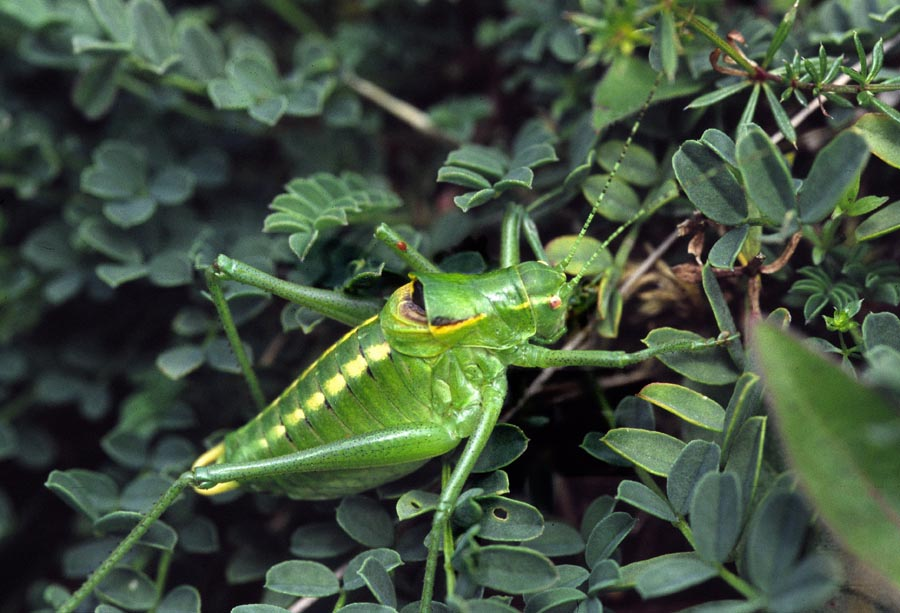

Conservation status
- Least Concern (IUCN 3.1)

Scientific classification
- Kingdom: Animalia
- Phylum: Arthropoda
- Class: Insecta
- Order: Orthoptera
- Suborder: Ensifera
- Family: Tettigoniidae
- Subfamily: Phaneropterinae
- Tribe: Barbitistini
- Genus: Poecilimon
- Species: P. ornatus

Binomial name
- Poecilimon ornatus (Schmidt, 1850)

Synonyms
- Ephippigera ornatus Schmidt, 1849

= Poecilimon ornatus =

Species of cricket-like animal

Poecilimon ornatus, also known as ornate bright bush-cricket or ornate bush-cricket, is a species of bush cricket belonging to the family Tettigoniidae, subfamily Phaneropterinae. It is endemic to southern Europe: the Balkans, northeastern Italy, Slovenia, and southern Austria,. It lives in high forbage, bushes, and open forests, and towards its northern limit, on warm montane grassland.

Close-Up of a Poecilimon ornatus
