= Kawanaphila pachomai =

Conservation status
- Endangered (IUCN 2.3)

Scientific classification
- Kingdom: Animalia
- Phylum: Arthropoda
- Class: Insecta
- Order: Orthoptera
- Suborder: Ensifera
- Family: Tettigoniidae
- Genus: Kawanaphila
- Species: K. pachomai

Binomial name
- Kawanaphila pachomai Rentz, 1993

Species of cricket-like animal

Kawanaphila pachomai is a species of insect in the family Tettigoniidae. It is endemic to Australia.
