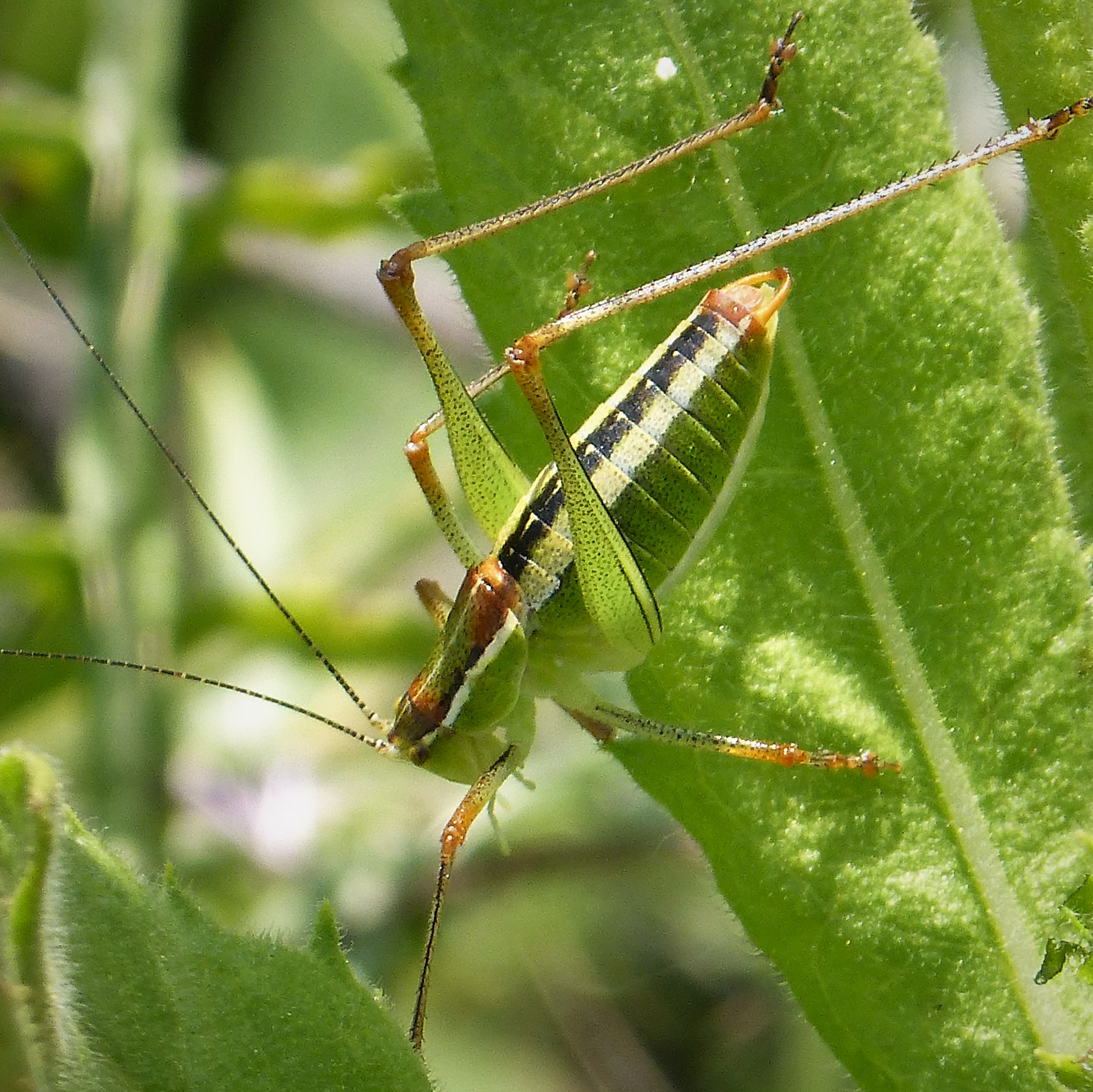
- Poecilimon jonicus male: the "Ionian Bright Bush-cricket"
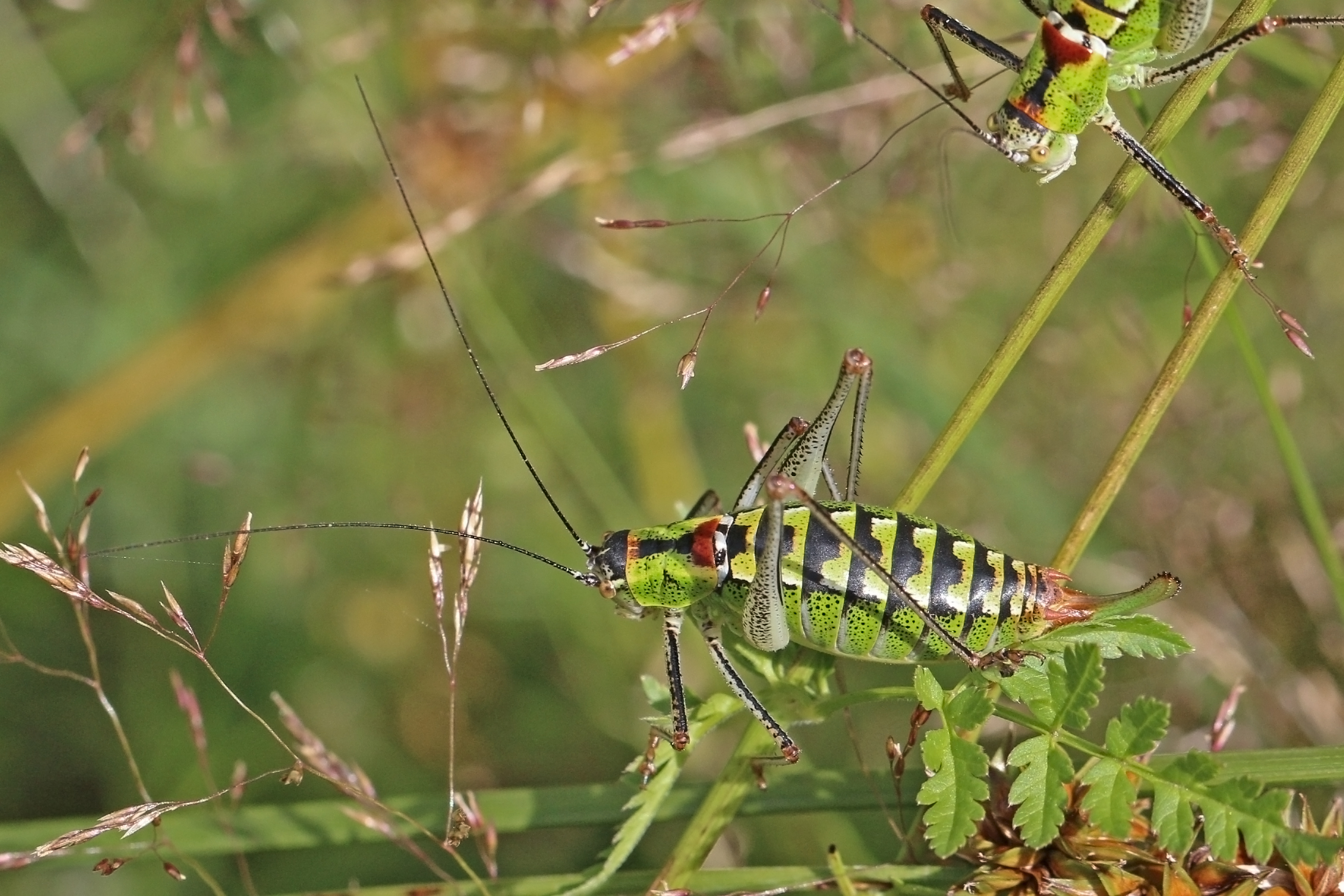
- Poecilimon thoracicus female

Scientific classification
- Domain: Eukaryota
- Kingdom: Animalia
- Phylum: Arthropoda
- Class: Insecta
- Order: Orthoptera
- Suborder: Ensifera
- Family: Tettigoniidae
- Subfamily: Phaneropterinae
- Tribe: Barbitistini
- Genus: Poecilimon; Fischer, 1853

Synonyms
- For subgenus Poecilimon: Artvinia Karabag, 1962; Eupoecilimon Tarbinsky, 1932; Micrimon Ramme, 1942; Parapoecilimon Karabag, 1975; Poecilimonella Uvarov, 1921

= Poecilimon =

Genus of cricket-like animals

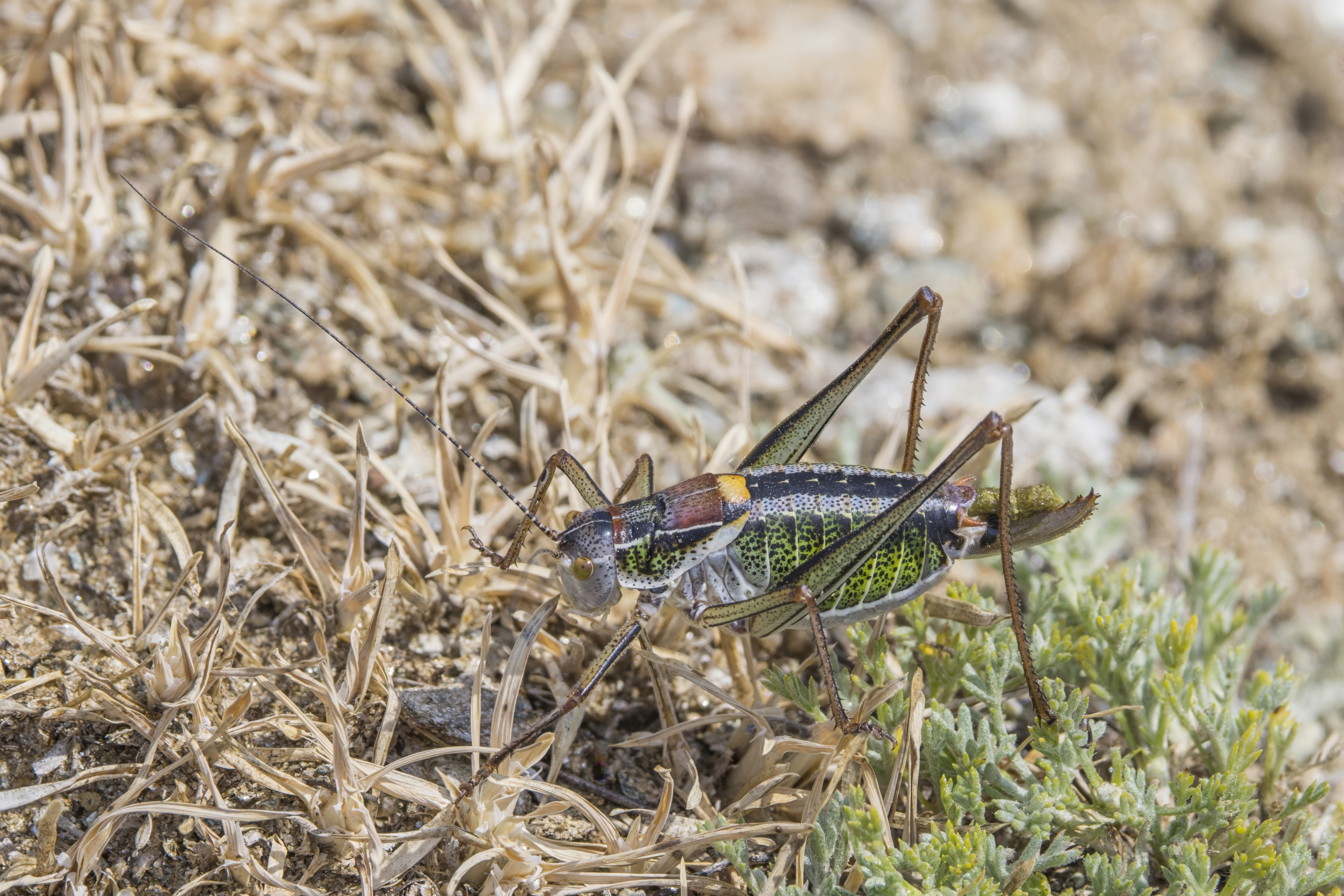
P. bilgeri nymph

Poecilimon is a genus of bush crickets in the subfamily Phaneropterinae and tribe Barbitistini. Species can be found in: central and Southeast Europe (including Italy and the Southern Alps, Southern Hungary, Romania, Bulgaria), the south of the European part of the former USSR, Asia Minor, Syria, Palestine, the Caucasus, Persia and extends in Central Asia to the Altai Mountains.

== Description ==
Because Poecilimon species are often brightly coloured, they may be called "bright bush crickets", although some are mostly green. As with many Orthoptera, colouration can be misleading, with variability within species. Often there is a stripe behind the eyes, dorsally dark and can extend beyond the pronotum. The fastigium is broader to narrower than the scapus. The pronotum is often shiny, smooth, and often rounded dorsally. These insects are often brachypterous and females can be apterous. In the males, the cerci are very different, but are always more or less conical in the females. The ovipositor is always straight and slightly curved upwards and serrated. The antennae are monochrome or ringed and about three times as long as the body.

== Species ==
The Orthoptera Species File now lists more than 140 species:

subgenus Hamatopoecilimon Heller, 2011

1. Poecilimon deplanatus Brunner von Wattenwyl, 1891
2. Poecilimon hamatus Brunner von Wattenwyl, 1878
3. Poecilimon ikariensis Willemse, 1982
4. Poecilimon klausgerhardi Fontana, 2004
5. Poecilimon paros Heller & Reinhold, 1992
6. Poecilimon unispinosus Brunner von Wattenwyl, 1878

=== subgenus Poecilimon Fischer, 1853 ===
species group ampliatus Brunner von Wattenwyl, 1878

1. Poecilimon amissus Brunner von Wattenwyl, 1878
2. Poecilimon ampliatus Brunner von Wattenwyl, 1878
3. Poecilimon ataturki Ünal, 1999
4. Poecilimon ebneri Ramme, 1933
5. Poecilimon glandifer Karabag, 1950
6. Poecilimon intermedius (Fieber, 1853)
7. Poecilimon marmaraensis Naskrecki, 1991

species group armeniacus (Uvarov, 1921)

1. Poecilimon armeniacus (Uvarov, 1921)
2. Poecilimon eskishehirensis Ünal, 2003
3. Poecilimon excisus Karabag, 1950
4. Poecilimon ferwillemsei Ünal, 2010
5. Poecilimon harveyi Karabag, 1964
6. Poecilimon haydari Ramme, 1951
7. Poecilimon inopinatus Ünal, 2010
8. Poecilimon karabagi (Ramme, 1942)

species group bosphoricus Brunner von Wattenwyl, 1878

1. Poecilimon athos Tilmans, Willemse & Willemse, 1989
2. Poecilimon bidens Retowski, 1889
3. Poecilimon bischoffi Ramme, 1933
4. Poecilimon bosphoricus Brunner von Wattenwyl, 1878
5. Poecilimon canakkale Kaya, Chobanov & Çiplak, 2015
6. Poecilimon cervus Karabag, 1950
7. Poecilimon demirsoyi Sevgili, 2001
8. Poecilimon diversus Ünal, 2010
9. Poecilimon djakonovi Miram, 1938
10. Poecilimon geoktschajcus Stshelkanovtzev, 1910
11. Poecilimon heinrichi (Ramme, 1951)
12. Poecilimon istanbul Ünal, 2010
13. Poecilimon kocaki Ünal, 1999
14. Poecilimon miramae Ramme, 1933
15. Poecilimon naskrecki Ünal, 2001
16. Poecilimon oligacanthus Miram, 1938
17. Poecilimon pliginskii Miram, 1929
18. Poecilimon roseoviridis Chobanov & Kaya, 2012
19. Poecilimon scythicus Stshelkanovtzev, 1911
20. Poecilimon similis Retowski, 1889
21. Poecilimon sureyanus Uvarov, 1930
22. Poecilimon tauricus Retowski, 1888
23. Poecilimon turciae (Ramme, 1951)
24. Poecilimon turcicus Karabag, 1950
25. Poecilimon warchalowskae Chobanov, Kaya & Çiplak, 2015

species group celebi Karabag, 1953

1. Poecilimon celebi Karabag, 1953
2. Poecilimon iucundus Ünal, 2003

species group concinnus Brunner von Wattenwyl, 1878

1. Poecilimon cervoides Karabag, 1964
2. Poecilimon concinnus Brunner von Wattenwyl, 1878
3. Poecilimon hatti Ünal, 2004
4. Poecilimon longicercus Ünal, 2010
5. Poecilimon xenocercus Karabag, 1956

species group davisi Karabag, 1953

1. Poecilimon davisi Karabag, 1953

species group elegans Brunner von Wattenwyl, 1878

1. Poecilimon albolineatus Ingrisch & Pavićević, 2010
2. Poecilimon elegans Brunner von Wattenwyl, 1878

species group heroicus Stshelkanovtzev, 1911

1. Poecilimon bifenestratus Miram, 1929
2. Poecilimon heroicus Stshelkanovtzev, 1911
3. Poecilimon tricuspis Miram, 1926
4. Poecilimon tschorochensis Adelung, 1907

species group inflatus Brunner von Wattenwyl, 1891

1. Poecilimon antalyaensis (Karabag, 1975)
2. Poecilimon bilgeri Karabag, 1953
3. Poecilimon cretensis Werner, 1903
4. Poecilimon inflatus Brunner von Wattenwyl, 1891
5. Poecilimon isopterus Kaya & Chobanov, 2018
6. Poecilimon martinae Heller, 2004

species group jonicus (Fieber, 1853)

1. Poecilimon erimanthos Willemse & Heller, 1992
2. Poecilimon jonicus (Fieber, 1853) – type species (as Barbitistes jonicus Fieber = P. jonicus jonicus)
3. Poecilimon laevissimus (Fischer, 1853)
4. Poecilimon tessellatus (Fischer, 1853)
5. Poecilimon werneri Ramme, 1933

species group luschani Ramme, 1933

1. Poecilimon egrigozi Ünal, 2005
2. Poecilimon helleri Boztepe, Kaya & Çiplak, 2013
3. Poecilimon ledereri Ramme, 1933
4. Poecilimon luschani Ramme, 1933
5. Poecilimon orbelicus Pančić, 1883
6. Poecilimon tuncayi Karabag, 1953

species group minutus Karabag, 1975

1. Poecilimon doga Ünal, 2004
2. Poecilimon karakushi Ünal, 2003
3. Poecilimon minutus Karabag, 1975
4. Poecilimon solus Ünal, 2010

species group ornatus (Schmidt, 1850)

1. Poecilimon affinis (Frivaldszky, 1868)
2. Poecilimon artedentatus Heller, 1984
3. Poecilimon gracilioides Willemse & Heller, 1992
4. Poecilimon gracilis (Fieber, 1853)
5. Poecilimon hoelzeli Harz, 1966
6. Poecilimon jablanicensis Chobanov & Heller, 2010
7. Poecilimon nobilis Brunner von Wattenwyl, 1878
8. Poecilimon nonveilleri Ingrisch & Pavićević, 2010
9. Poecilimon obesus Brunner von Wattenwyl, 1878
10. Poecilimon ornatus (Schmidt, 1850)
11. Poecilimon pindos Willemse, 1982
12. Poecilimon pseudornatus Ingrisch & Pavićević, 2010
13. Poecilimon soulion Willemse, 1987

species group pergamicus Brunner von Wattenwyl, 1891

1. Poecilimon kutahiensis Werner, 1901
2. Poecilimon pergamicus Brunner von Wattenwyl, 1891

species group propinquus Brunner von Wattenwyl, 1878

1. Poecilimon aegaeus Werner, 1932
2. Poecilimon chopardi Ramme, 1933
3. Poecilimon gerlindae Lehmann, Willemse & Heller, 2006
4. Poecilimon mariannae Willemse & Heller, 1992
5. Poecilimon propinquus Brunner von Wattenwyl, 1878
6. Poecilimon thessalicus Brunner von Wattenwyl, 1891
7. Poecilimon veluchianus Ramme, 1933
8. Poecilimon zimmeri Ramme, 1933

species group sanctipauli Brunner von Wattenwyl, 1878

1. Poecilimon lodosi Harz, 1975
2. Poecilimon mytilenensis Werner, 1932
3. Poecilimon pulcher Brunner von Wattenwyl, 1891
4. Poecilimon sanctipauli Brunner von Wattenwyl, 1878

species group syriacus Brunner von Wattenwyl, 1891

1. Poecilimon adentatus Ramme, 1933
2. Poecilimon angulatus Uvarov, 1939
3. Poecilimon ege Ünal, 2005
4. Poecilimon ersisi Salman, 1978
5. Poecilimon izmirensis Ramme, 1933
6. Poecilimon karabukensis Ünal, 2003
7. Poecilimon obtusicercus Heller, Sevgili & Reinhold, 2008
8. Poecilimon serratus Karabag, 1962
9. Poecilimon syriacus Brunner von Wattenwyl, 1891
10. Poecilimon toros Ünal, 2003

species group zonatus Bolívar, 1899

1. Poecilimon azizsancar Sevgili, 2018
2. Poecilimon ciplaki Kaya, 2018
3. Poecilimon isozonatus Kaya, 2018
4. Poecilimon salmani Sevgili, 2018
5. Poecilimon tauricola Ramme, 1951
6. Poecilimon varicornis (Haan, 1843)
7. Poecilimon variicercis Miram, 1938
8. Poecilimon vodnensis Karaman, 1958
9. Poecilimon zonatus Bolívar, 1899

species group not assigned

1. Poecilimon brunneri (Frivaldszky, 1868)
2. Poecilimon chostae Stshelkanovtzev, 1935
3. Poecilimon distinctus Stshelkanovtzev, 1910
4. Poecilimon flavescens (Herrich-Schäffer, 1838)
5. Poecilimon fussii Fieber, 1878
6. Poecilimon guichardi Karabag, 1964
7. Poecilimon hadjisarandou Werner, 1938
8. Poecilimon lateralis (Fieber, 1853)
9. Poecilimon macedonicus Ramme, 1926
10. Poecilimon neglectus Ramme, 1931
11. Poecilimon nivalis Chobanov, 2023
12. Poecilimon pechevi Andreeva, 1978
13. Poecilimon schmidtii (Fieber, 1853)
14. Poecilimon stschelkanovzevi Tarbinsky, 1932
15. Poecilimon thoracicus (Fieber, 1853)
16. Poecilimon ukrainicus Bey-Bienko, 1951
17. Poecilimon zwicki Ramme, 1939
