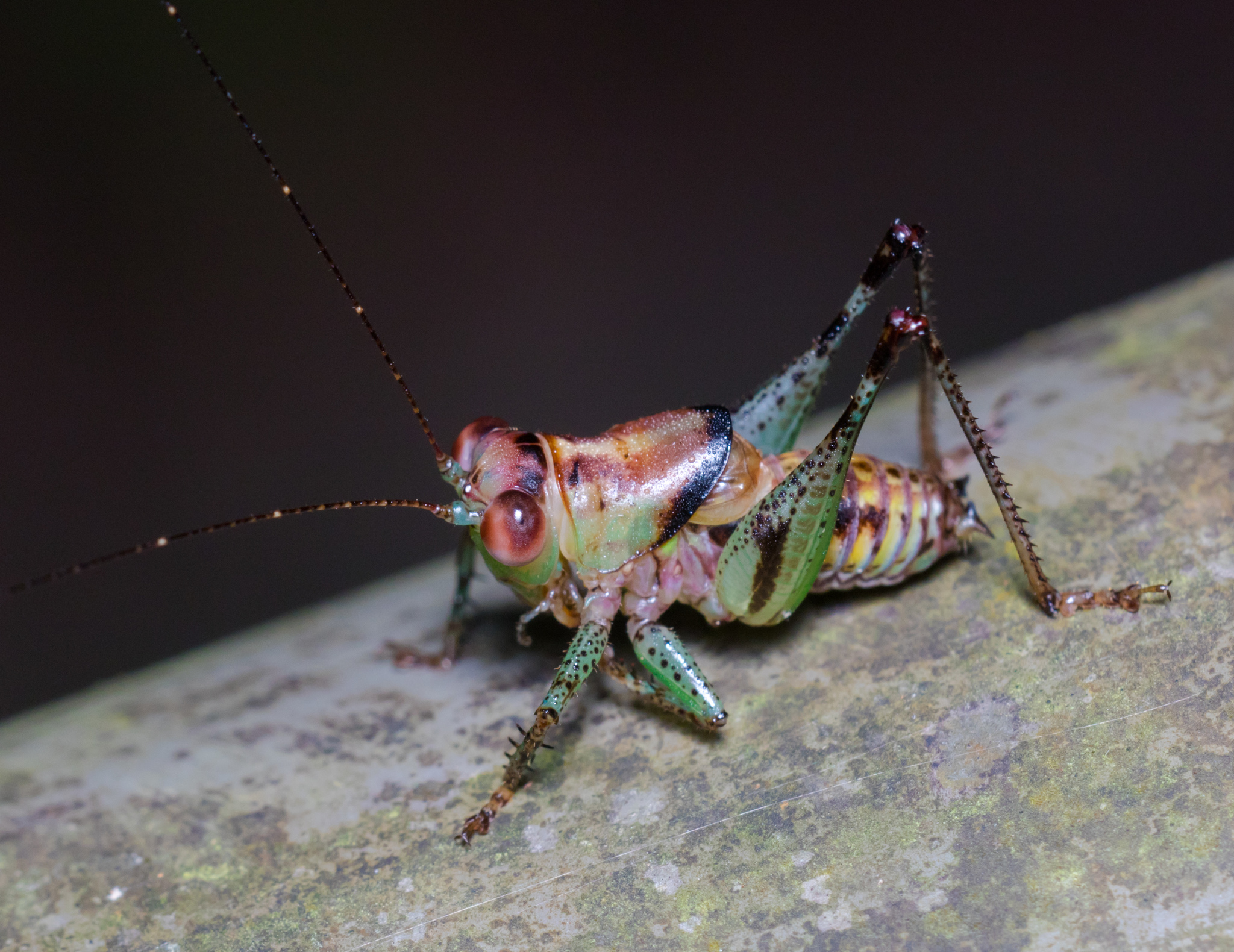
- Lipotactes sinicus

Scientific classification
- Domain: Eukaryota
- Kingdom: Animalia
- Phylum: Arthropoda
- Class: Insecta
- Order: Orthoptera
- Suborder: Ensifera
- Family: Tettigoniidae
- Subfamily: Lipotactinae
- Genus: Lipotactes; Brunner von Wattenwyl, 1898

= Lipotactes =

Genus of cricket-like animals

Lipotactes is a genus of bush crickets found in southern China, Indo-China and Malesia; it is the only living genus in the subfamily Lipotactinae.

== Species ==
The Orthoptera Species File lists the following:

subgenus Analipotactes Gorochov, 2021

- Lipotactes amicus Gorochov, 1993

subgenus Dialipotactes Gorochov, 2021

- Lipotactes maculatus Hebard, 1922

subgenus Eulipotactes Gorochov, 2021

- Lipotactes azureus Gorochov, 1996
- Lipotactes dorsaspina Chang, Shi & Ran, 2005
- Lipotactes orlovi Gorochov, 1996
- Lipotactes proximus Gorochov, 1996
- Lipotactes serratus Ingrisch, 2021
- Lipotactes vietnamicus Gorochov, 1993

subgenus Lipotactes Brunner von Wattenwyl, 1898

- Lipotactes alienus Brunner von Wattenwyl, 1898 - type species (4 subspp.: L. alienus alienus)
- Lipotactes angulatus Ingrisch, 2021
- Lipotactes concolor (Kästner, 1933)
- Lipotactes digitatus (Karny, 1931)
- Lipotactes kabili Tan, Japir & Chung, 2020
- Lipotactes laminus Shi & Li, 2009
- Lipotactes macrognathus (Ingrisch, 1995)
- Lipotactes minutus Ingrisch, 1995
- Lipotactes ovatus (Ingrisch, 1995)
- Lipotactes parvus (Ingrisch, 1995)
- Lipotactes sinicus (Bey-Bienko, 1959)
- Lipotactes sulcatus Ingrisch, 1995
- Lipotactes sumatranus Gorochov, 2021
- Lipotactes tripyrga Chang, Shi & Ran, 2005
- Lipotactes truncatus Shi & Li, 2009
- Lipotactes virescens Ingrisch, 1995

subgenus Miolipotactes Gorochov, 2021

- Lipotactes minutissimus Gorochov, 2008

subgenus Mortoniellus Griffini, 1909

- Lipotactes karnyi (Griffini, 1909)

subgenus Neolipotactes Gorochov, 2021

- Lipotactes montanus Ingrisch, 1990
- Lipotactes silvestris Ingrisch, 1990

subgenus Prolipotactes Gorochov, 2021

- Lipotactes hamatus (Karny, 1931)
- Lipotactes siebersi Ingrisch, 1995

subgenus Sublipotactes Gorochov, 2021

- Lipotactes discus Ingrisch, 2021
- Lipotactes ingrischi Gorochov, 1996
- Lipotactes khmericus Gorochov, 1998

subgenus not determined

- Lipotactes azuriventer Karny, 1924
- Lipotactes longicauda Ingrisch, 1995
- Lipotactes vittifemur Karny, 1924
