= Poecilimon nonveilleri =

Conservation status
- Data Deficient (IUCN 3.1)

Scientific classification
- Kingdom: Animalia
- Phylum: Arthropoda
- Clade: Pancrustacea
- Class: Insecta
- Order: Orthoptera
- Suborder: Ensifera
- Family: Tettigoniidae
- Subfamily: Phaneropterinae
- Genus: Poecilimon
- Species: P. nonveilleri

Binomial name
- Poecilimon nonveilleri (Ingrisch & Pavićević, 2010)
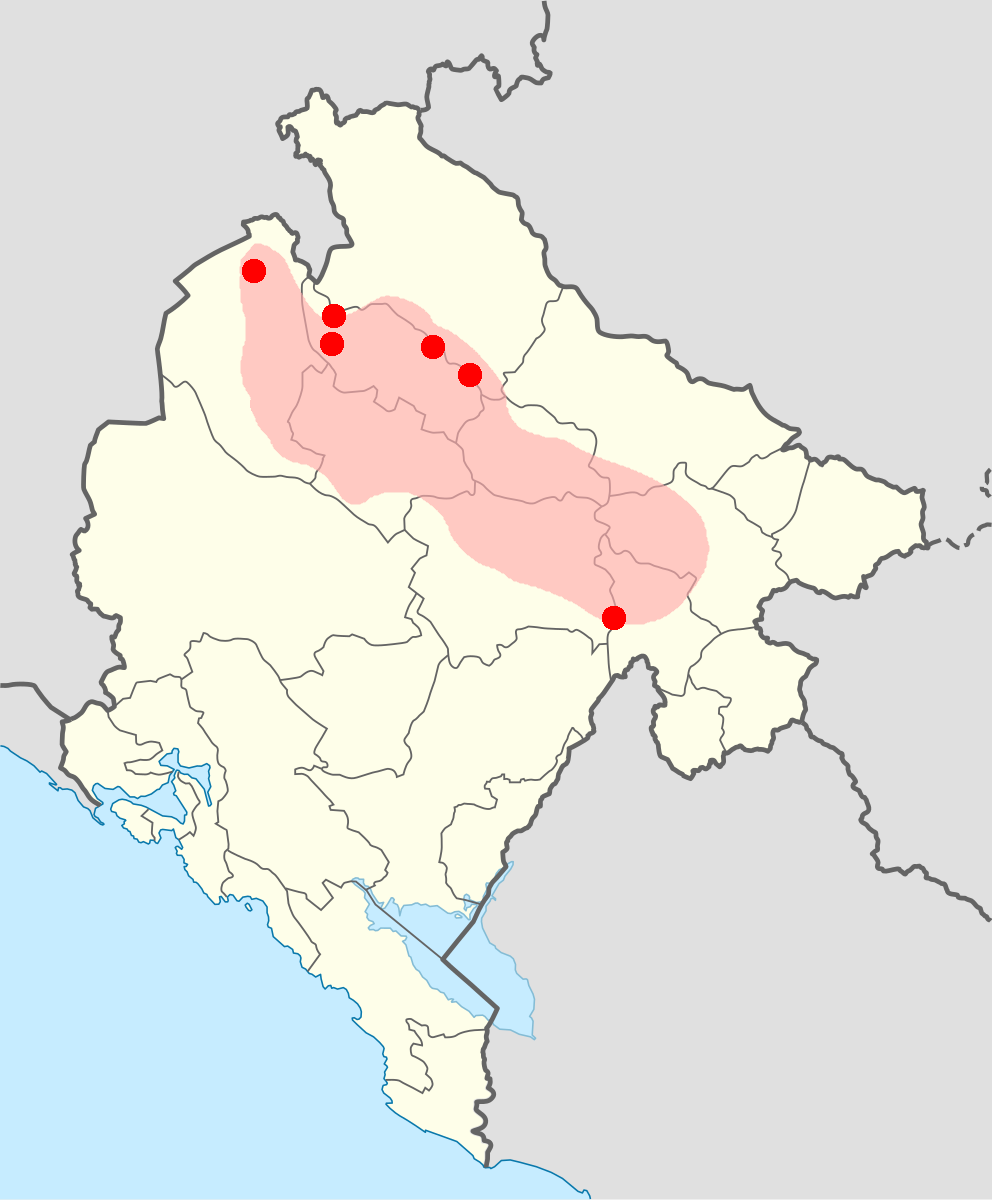
- Poecilimon nonveilleri records map

Species of bush cricket

Poecilimon nonveilleri, also known as Nonveiller's bright bush-cricket, is a species of bush cricket belonging to the family Tettigoniidae, subfamily Phaneropterinae. It is found in Montenegro, and was named in honour of noted Croatian entomologist Guido Nonveiller.

== Morphology ==
Of the morphological structures analyzed, the stridulatory file and the male cercus provided the most reliable diagnostic characters for distinguishing this species from its closest relatives within the P. affinis complex.

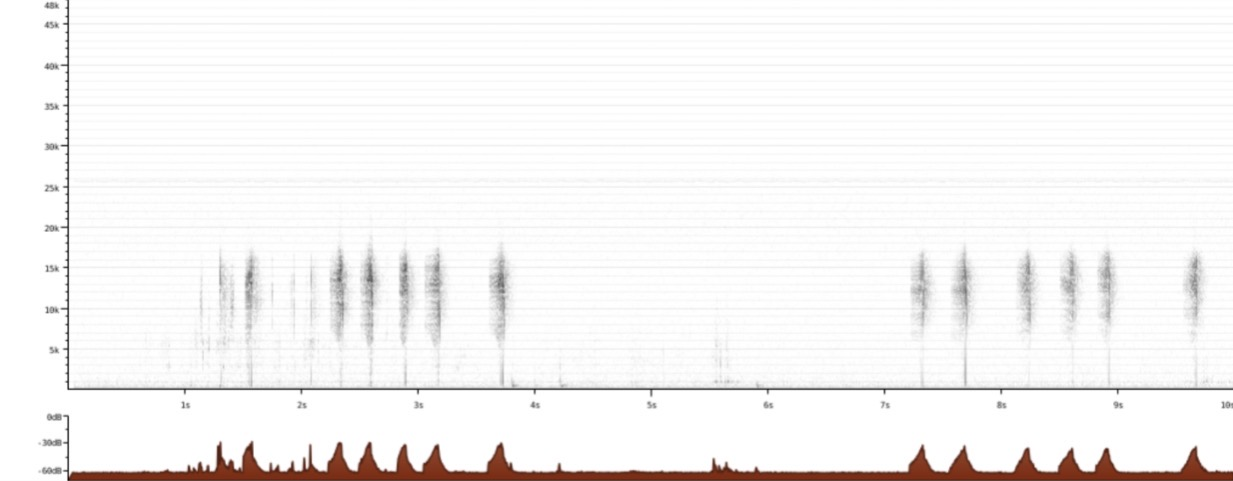
Spectogram

The male tegmen length was found to be highly consistent. Its length ranges from 3.74 to 4.32 mm, with an average of 3.97 mm. The number of teeth on the file ranges from 104 to 119, with an average of 111 teeth.

Male Cercus:Analysis of the male cercus shape proved to be one of the most reliable diagnostic features, showing clear and consistent separation from other members of the P. affinis species complex(approximately middle between 6 and 3 mm)

Other Morphological Structures:Other structures were less diagnostic for species identification. Analysis of the male tegmen shape revealed significant overlap with related species such as P. pseudornatus, P. poecilus, and P. affinis, making it unreliable for identification on its own. Similarly, the shape of the male pronotum showed substantial overlap with most species in the complex, with the exception of P. rumijae, which was more distinct. In contrast, the ovipositor was found to be a valuable diagnostic feature, as species within the P. affinis complex could be clearly separated from one another based on its structure(P. nonveilleri has lower point of gonangulum)

== Distribution ==
Poecilimon nonveilleri is endemic to northern Montenegro. While its confirmed distribution is limited to 14 records within the municipalities of Žabljak, Pljevlja, Plužine, and Andrijevica, its range is likely more extensive. It is suspected to also inhabit the adjacent municipalities of Šavnik, Mojkovac, Kolašin, Berane, and Bijelo Polje.

Poecilimon nonveilleri is present in the relatively restricted area of the Durmitor Plateau and in the surrounding canyons, including Tara, Piva and Sušica canyons. It inhabits elevations from 500 to 1,200 meters, with some populations reaching up to 2,000 meters. Its preferred habitats include forest glades, shrublands, various forest associations, and montane to alpine meadows.
