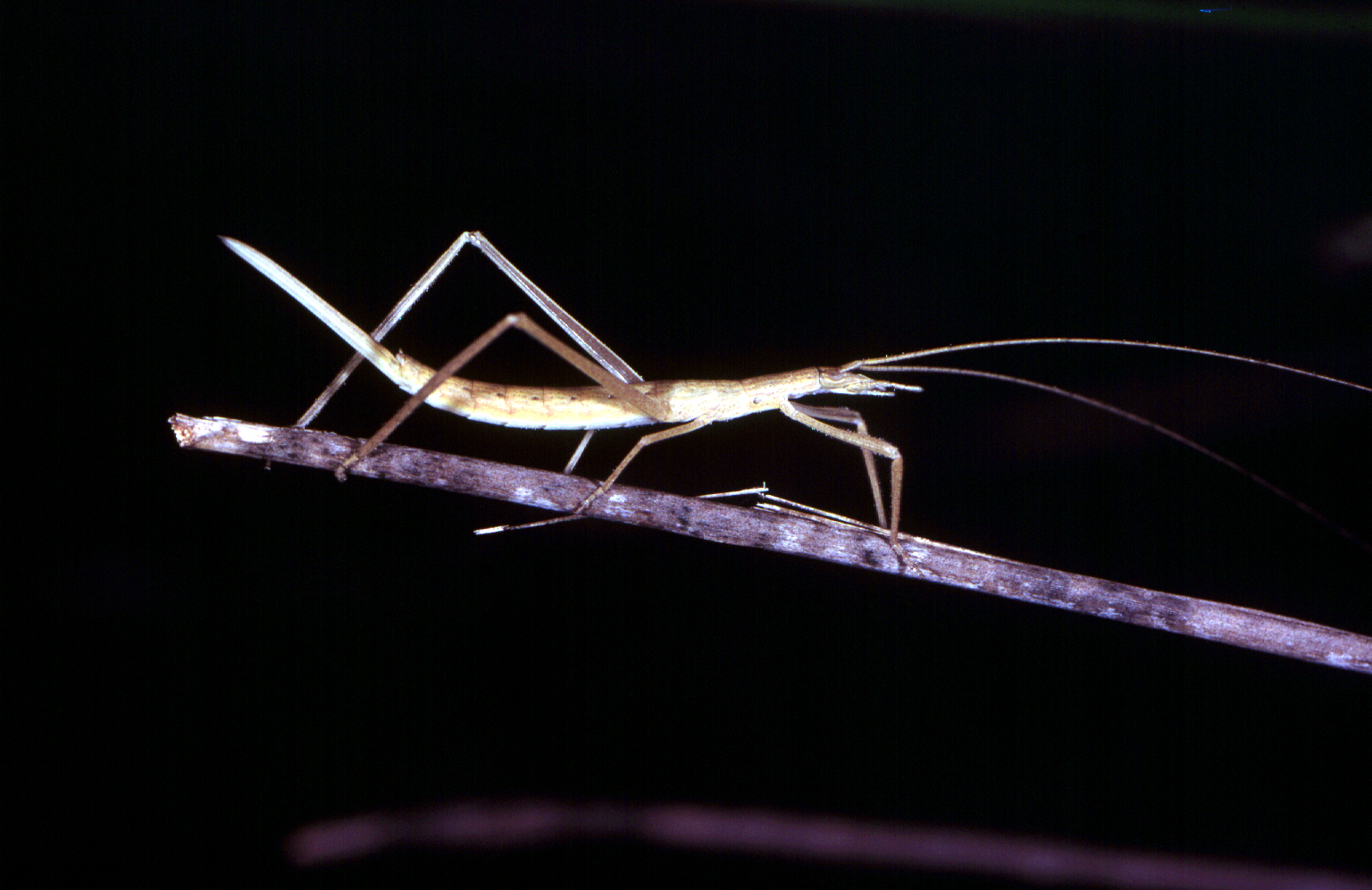
- Unidentified Kawanaphila species

Scientific classification
- Domain: Eukaryota
- Kingdom: Animalia
- Phylum: Arthropoda
- Class: Insecta
- Order: Orthoptera
- Suborder: Ensifera
- Family: Tettigoniidae
- Subfamily: Zaprochilinae
- Genus: Kawanaphila; Rentz, 1993

= Kawanaphila =

Genus of cricket-like animals

Kawanaphila is a genus of insects in family Tettigoniidae (bush crickets or katydids) from Australia. It was described in 1993 by David C. Rentz.

== Species ==
Kawanaphila contains the following species:

1. Kawanaphila gidya Rentz, 1993
2. Kawanaphila goolwa Rentz, 1993
3. Kawanaphila iyouta Rentz, 1993
4. Kawanaphila lexceni Rentz, 1993
5. Kawanaphila mirla Rentz, 1993
6. Kawanaphila nartee Rentz, 1993 - type species
7. Kawanaphila pachomai Rentz, 1993 (Endangered)
8. Kawanaphila pillara Rentz, 1993
9. Kawanaphila triodiae Rentz, 1993
10. Kawanaphila ungarunya Rentz, 1993
11. Kawanaphila yarraga Rentz, 1993
