= Zaprochilus ninae =

Conservation status
- Vulnerable (IUCN 2.3)

Scientific classification
- Kingdom: Animalia
- Phylum: Arthropoda
- Class: Insecta
- Order: Orthoptera
- Suborder: Ensifera
- Family: Tettigoniidae
- Genus: Zaprochilus
- Species: Z. ninae

Binomial name
- Zaprochilus ninae (Brulle, 1835)

Species of cricket-like animal

Zaprochilus ninae is a species of insect in family Tettigoniidae. It is endemic to Australia.
