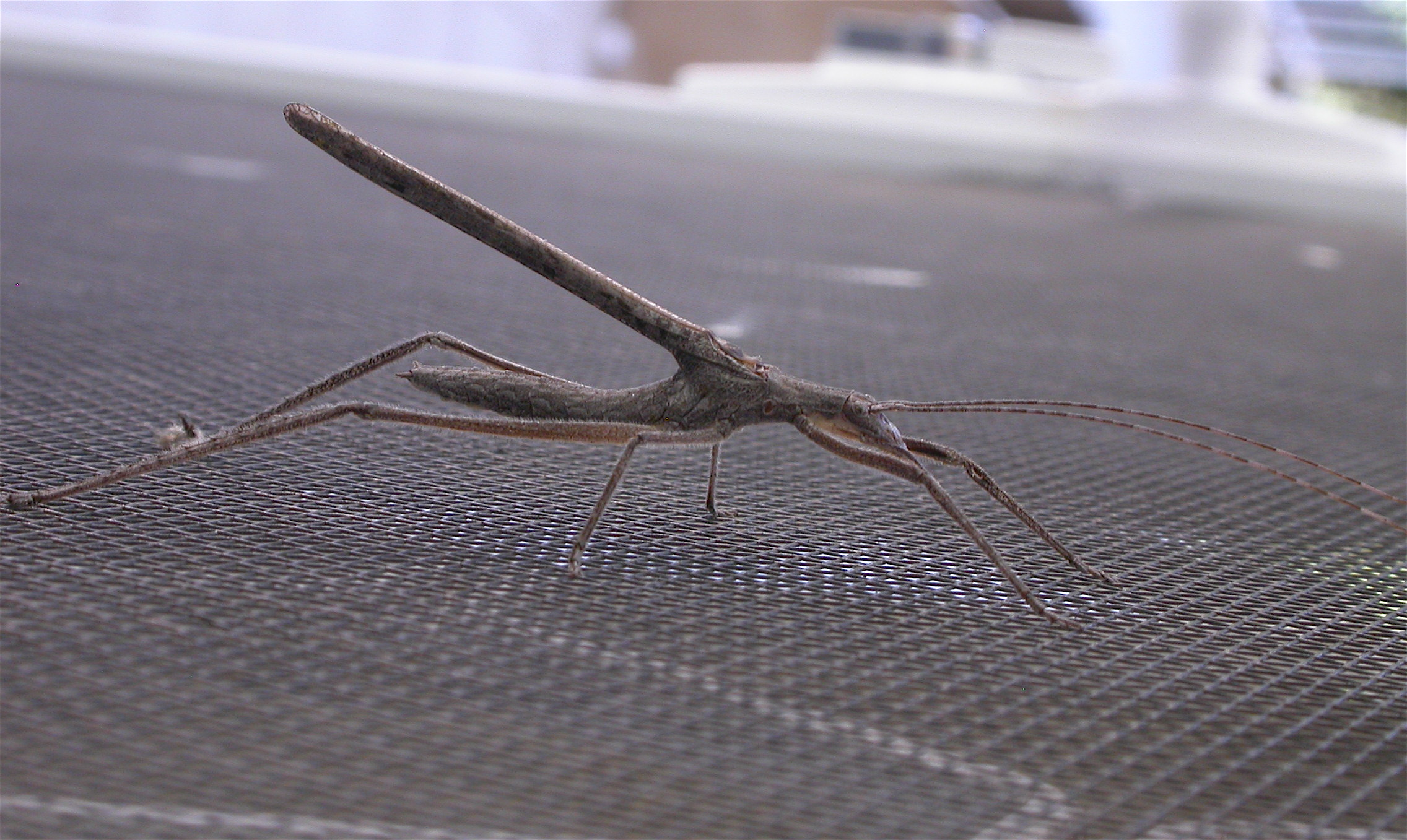
- Zaprochilus australis

Scientific classification
- Domain: Eukaryota
- Kingdom: Animalia
- Phylum: Arthropoda
- Class: Insecta
- Order: Orthoptera
- Suborder: Ensifera
- Family: Tettigoniidae
- Subfamily: Zaprochilinae
- Genus: Zaprochilus; Caudell, 1909

Synonyms
- Prochilus Brullé, 1835

= Zaprochilus =

Genus of cricket-like animals

Zaprochilus, the twig-mimicking katydids, is a genus of bush crickets or katydids in the subfamily Zaprochilinae. They are found in Australia.

== Species ==
The genus Zaprochilus contains the following species:

1. Zaprochilus australis (Brullé, 1835) - type species
2. Zaprochilus jingemarra Rentz, 1993
3. Zaprochilus mongabarra Rentz, 1993
4. Zaprochilus ninae Rentz, 1993
