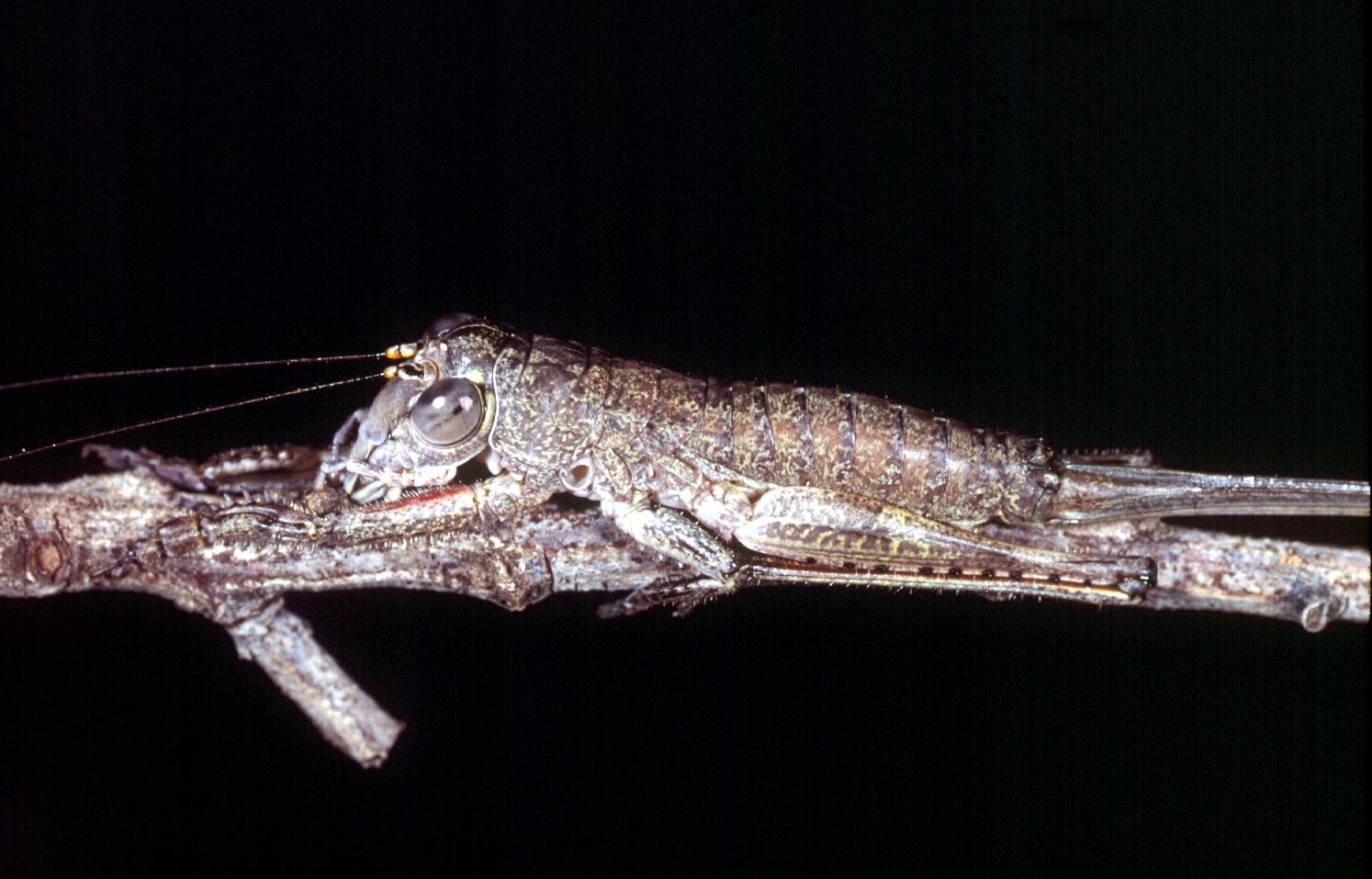
- Tympanophora sp. (CSIRO)

Scientific classification
- Kingdom: Animalia
- Phylum: Arthropoda
- Clade: Pancrustacea
- Class: Insecta
- Order: Orthoptera
- Suborder: Ensifera
- Family: Tettigoniidae
- Subfamily: Tympanophorinae; Brunner von Wattenwyl, 1893

= Tympanophorinae =

Subfamily of cricket-like animals

The Tympanophorinae are a monogeneric subfamily of bush-crickets, sometimes called balloon-winged bush-crickets, erected (as family Tympanophoridae) by Carl Brunner von Wattenwyl in 1893. The single genus is found in Australia.

== Genera ==
There is a single extant genus: Tympanophora White, 1841. The extinct genus †Eomortoniellus Zeuner, 1936 was placed here, but is now included in the Lipotactinae.
