= Windbalea =

Scientific classification
- Domain: Eukaryota
- Kingdom: Animalia
- Phylum: Arthropoda
- Class: Insecta
- Order: Orthoptera
- Suborder: Ensifera
- Family: Tettigoniidae
- Subfamily: Zaprochilinae
- Genus: Windbalea; Rentz, 1993

Genus of cricket-like animals

Windbalea is a genus of insects in the family Tettigoniidae. It contains the following species:

- Windbalea viride Rentz, 1993
- Windbalea warrooa Rentz, 1993
