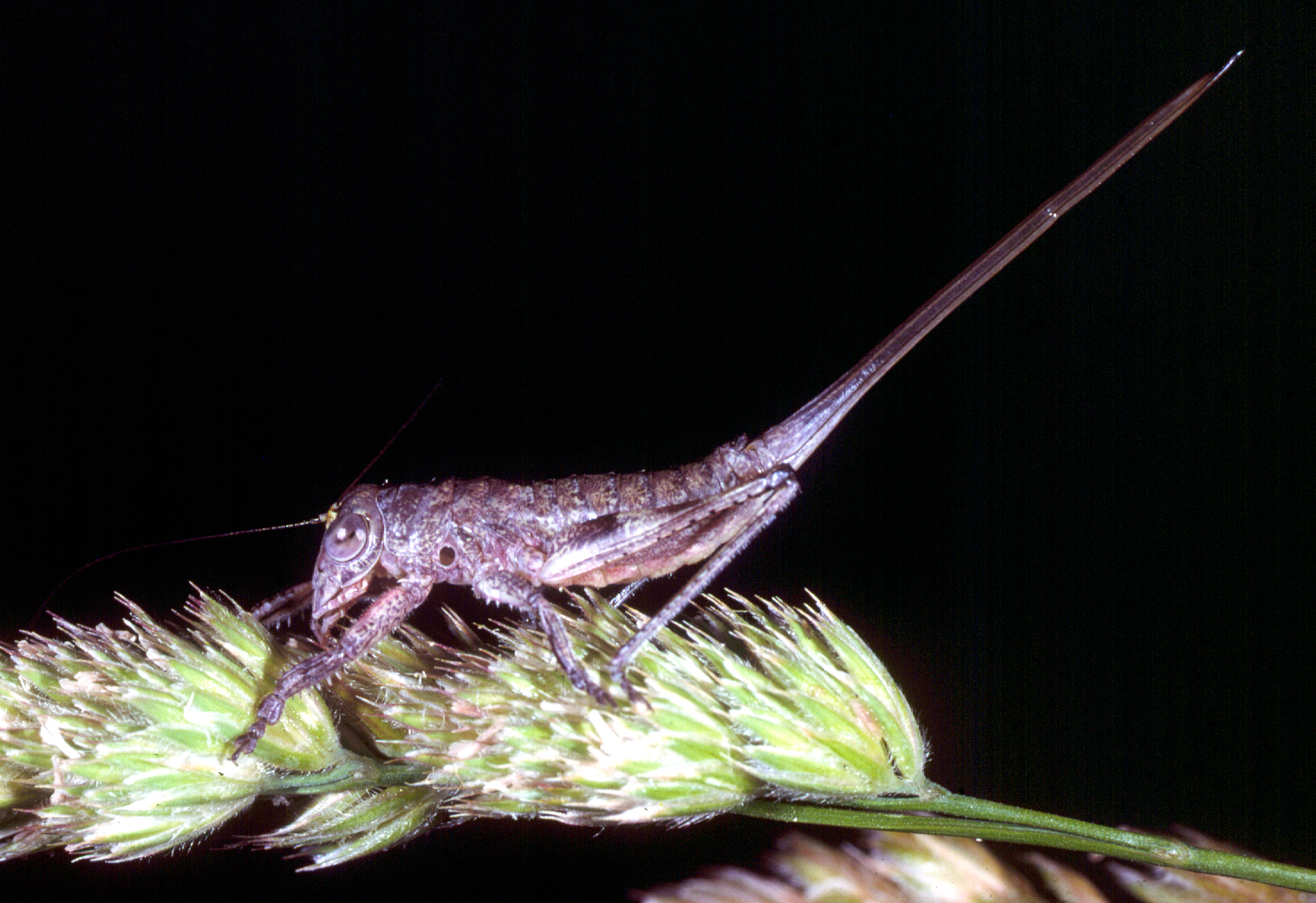
- Unknown Tympanophora species

Scientific classification
- Kingdom: Animalia
- Phylum: Arthropoda
- Class: Insecta
- Order: Orthoptera
- Suborder: Ensifera
- Family: Tettigoniidae
- Subfamily: Tympanophorinae
- Genus: Tympanophora; White, 1841

= Tympanophora =

Genus of cricket-like animals

Tympanophora is a genus of bush-crickets, known as balloon-winged katydids, found in Australia. It is the only extant (living) genus in the subfamily Tympanophorinae.

== Species ==
The genus contains the following species:

- Tympanophora aka Rentz, 2001
- Tympanophora andreae Rentz, 2001
- Tympanophora diminuta Riek, 1976
- Tympanophora houstoni Rentz, 2001
- Tympanophora insolita Riek, 1976
- Tympanophora kalbarri Rentz, 2001
- Tympanophora ourapilla Rentz, 2001
- Tympanophora pellucida White, 1841
- Tympanophora picta Riek, 1976
- Tympanophora pinnaroo Rentz, 2001
- Tympanophora rotto Rentz, 2001
- Tympanophora similis Riek, 1976
- Tympanophora splendida Riek, 1976
- Tympanophora uvarovi Zeuner, 1936
