= Microtettigonia =

Scientific classification
- Kingdom: Animalia
- Phylum: Arthropoda
- Clade: Pancrustacea
- Class: Insecta
- Order: Orthoptera
- Suborder: Ensifera
- Family: Tettigoniidae
- Subfamily: Microtettigoniinae; Rentz, 1979
- Genus: Microtettigonia; Rentz, 1979

Type species
- Microtettigonia kangaroo Rentz, 1979

Genus of cricket-like animals

Microtettigonia is a genus of bush-crickets or katydids, endemic to Western Australia and known as micro katydids. It is the only genus of the subfamily Microtettigoniinae.

== Species ==
Microtettigonia includes the following species:

- Microtettigonia alleni Rentz, 2001
- Microtettigonia illcha Rentz, 2001
- Microtettigonia kangaroo Rentz, 1979
- Microtettigonia kutyeri Rentz, 2001
- Microtettigonia tachys Rentz, 1979
- Microtettigonia tunte Rentz, 2001
- Microtettigonia whippoo Rentz, 2001

== External links and illustrations ==
- Data related to Microtettigoniinae at Wikispecies
- Esperance Fauna: Microtettigonia tachys
