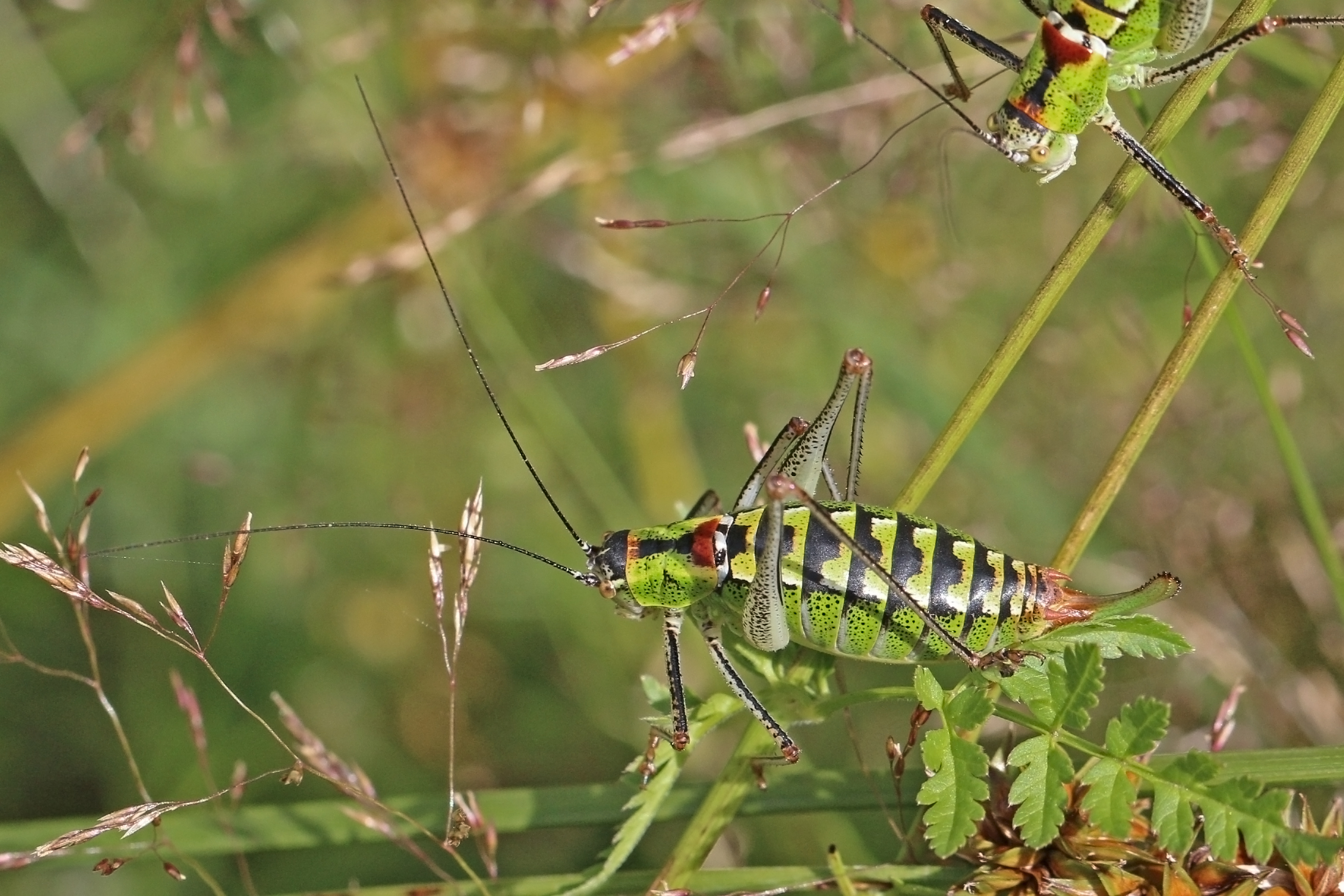

Conservation status
- Least Concern (IUCN 3.1)

Scientific classification
- Kingdom: Animalia
- Phylum: Arthropoda
- Class: Insecta
- Order: Orthoptera
- Suborder: Ensifera
- Family: Tettigoniidae
- Subfamily: Phaneropterinae
- Genus: Poecilimon
- Species: P. thoracicus

Binomial name
- Poecilimon thoracicus (Fieber, 1853)

Synonyms
- Barbitistes thoracicus Fieber, 1853; Odontura thoracica (Fieber, 1853)

= Poecilimon thoracicus =

Species of bush cricket

Poecilimon thoracicus, also known as the bellied bright bush-cricket, is a species of bush cricket, family Tettigoniidae. It occurs on the southern Balkan Peninsula.

The species is nocturnal. It inhabits meadows, forest edges, and clearings.
