= Pseudotettigoniinae =

Scientific classification
- Domain: Eukaryota
- Kingdom: Animalia
- Phylum: Arthropoda
- Class: Insecta
- Order: Orthoptera
- Suborder: Ensifera
- Family: Tettigoniidae
- Subfamily: †Pseudotettigoniinae; Sharov, 1962

Extinct subfamily of cricket-like animals

The Pseudotettigoniinae are an extinct subfamily of the Tettigoniidae.

== Genera and species ==
The Orthoptera Species File lists the following:

- †Arctolocusta Zeuner, 1937: †A. groenlandica (Heer, 1883)
- †Lithymnetes Scudder, 1878: †L. guttatus Scudder, 1878
- †Nymphomorpha Henriksen, 1922: †N. medialis Henriksen, 1922
- †Pseudotettigonia Zeuner, 1937:
  - †Pseudotettigonia amoena (Henriksen, 1929)
  - †Pseudotettigonia leona Greenwalt & Rust, 2014

Other extinct genera in the Tettigoniidae, not assigned to a subfamily include:

- †Locustites Heer, 1849: 3 spp.
- †Locustophanes Handlirsch, 1939: †L. rhipidophorus Handlirsch, 1939
- †Prophasgonura Piton, 1940: †P. lineatocollis Piton, 1940
- †Protempusa Piton, 1940: †P. incerta Piton, 1940
- †Prototettix Giebel, 1856: †P. lithanthraca (Goldenberg, 1854)
