= Tettigoides =

Tettigoides Temporal range: Ypresian
- Orthoptera: Tettigoniidae

Scientific classification
- Kingdom: Animalia
- Phylum: Arthropoda
- Clade: Pancrustacea
- Class: Insecta
- Order: Orthoptera
- Suborder: Ensifera
- Family: Tettigoniidae
- Subfamily: †Tettigoidinae; Riek, 1952
- Genus: †Tettigoides; Riek, 1952
- Species: †T. pectinata

Binomial name
- †Tettigoides pectinata Riek, 1952

Extinct genus of cricket-like animals

Tettigoides is an extinct genus of katydids containing a single species, Tettigoides pectinata. It is the only known genus and species in the subfamily Tettigoidinae, from Ypresian-age deposits near Dinmore, Queensland, Australia.
