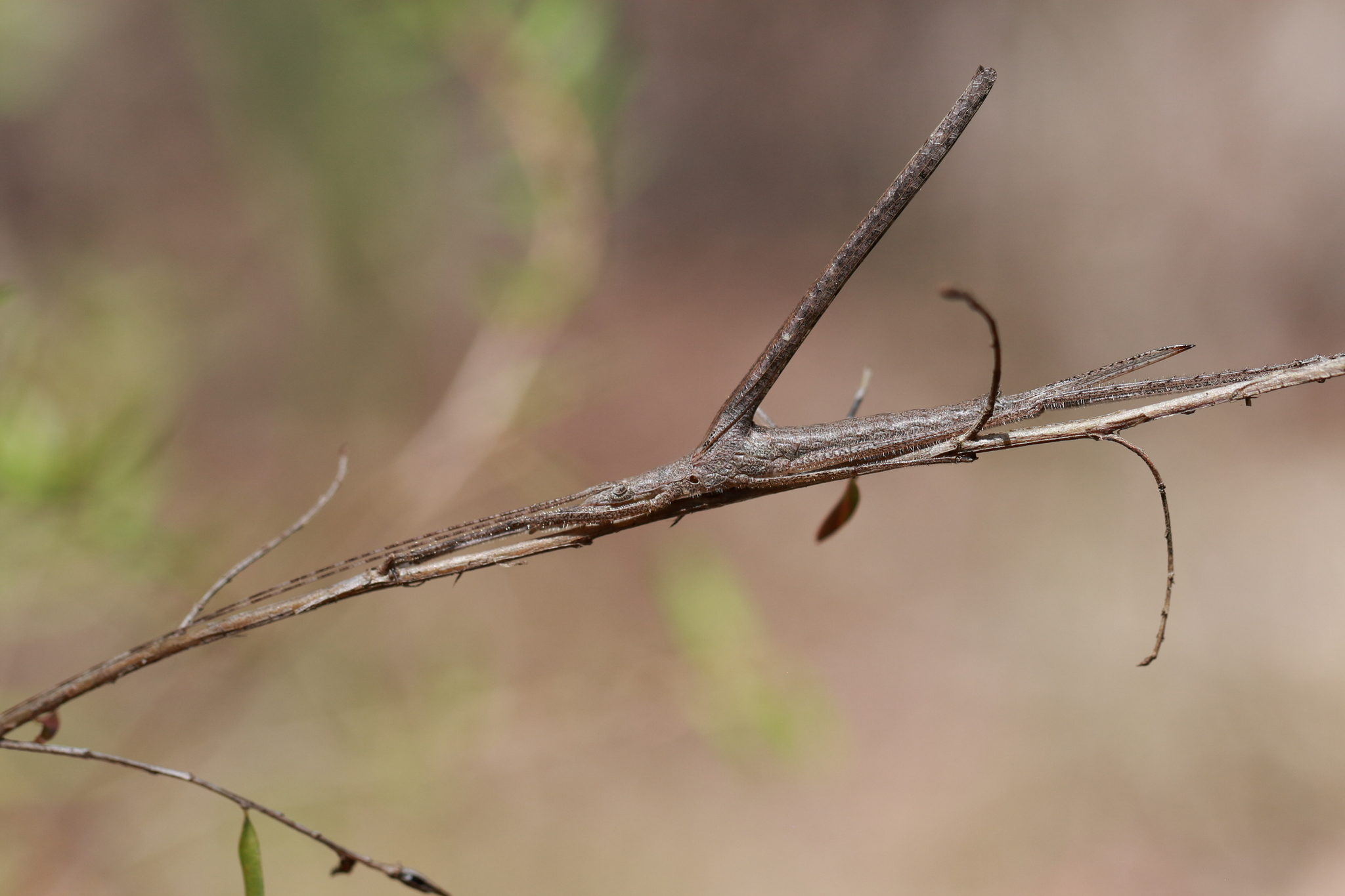
- Zaprochilus australis

Scientific classification
- Domain: Eukaryota
- Kingdom: Animalia
- Phylum: Arthropoda
- Class: Insecta
- Order: Orthoptera
- Suborder: Ensifera
- Superfamily: Tettigonioidea
- Family: Tettigoniidae
- Subfamily: Zaprochilinae; Handlirsch, 1925

= Zaprochilinae =

Subfamily of cricket-like animals

Zaprochilinae is a subfamily of bush-crickets found in Australia; the type genus is Zaprochilus.

== Description ==
The head is prognathous, the shape of the body is rod-shaped similar to stick insects. They live and feed on flowers. There are winged, short-winged and wingless forms (e.g. females of Kawanaphila).

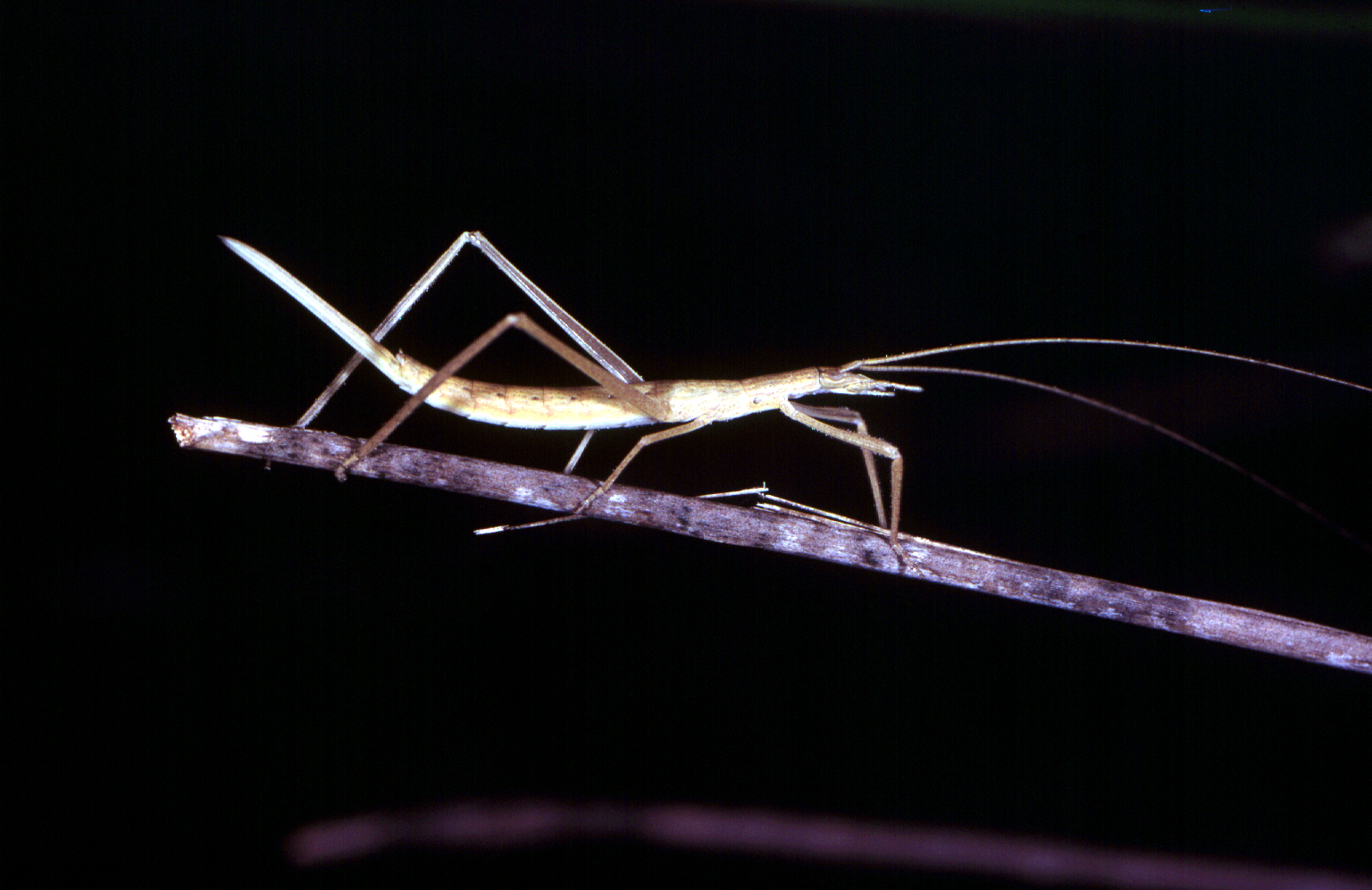
Kawanaphila sp.

== Genera ==
The Orthoptera Species File includes:

1. Anthophiloptera: monotypic Anthophiloptera dryas Rentz & Clyne, 1983
2. Kawanaphila Rentz, 1993
3. Windbalea Rentz, 1993
4. Zaprochilus Caudell, 1909
