= Rammea =

Rammea Temporal range: Early Miocene

Scientific classification
- Kingdom: Animalia
- Phylum: Arthropoda
- Class: Insecta
- Order: Orthoptera
- Suborder: Ensifera
- Family: Tettigoniidae
- Subfamily: †Rammeinae; Zeuner, 1931
- Genus: †Rammea; Zeuner, 1931
- Species: †R. laticeps

Binomial name
- †Rammea laticeps Zeuner, 1931

Extinct genus of cricket-like animals

Rammea is an extinct genus in the Tettigoniidae, containing a single species, Rammea laciceps. The type locality is Böttingen in Germany. It is the only genus and species in the subfamily Rammeinae.
