= Phasmodes =

Scientific classification
- Domain: Eukaryota
- Kingdom: Animalia
- Phylum: Arthropoda
- Class: Insecta
- Order: Orthoptera
- Suborder: Ensifera
- Family: Tettigoniidae
- Subfamily: Phasmodinae; Caudell, 1912
- Genus: Phasmodes; Caudell, 1912

Genus of cricket-like animals

Phasmodes, known as stick katydids, is a genus of Australian insects in the family Tettigoniidae and the only genus within the subfamily Phasmodinae.

== Species ==
The Orthoptera species file lists:

1. Phasmodes jeeba Rentz, 1993
2. Phasmodes nungeroo Rentz, 1993
3. Phasmodes ranatriformis Westwood, 1843
