= Lipotactinae =

Scientific classification
- Domain: Eukaryota
- Kingdom: Animalia
- Phylum: Arthropoda
- Class: Insecta
- Order: Orthoptera
- Suborder: Ensifera
- Family: Tettigoniidae
- Subfamily: Lipotactinae; Ingrisch, 1995

Synonyms
- Lipotactini Ingrisch, 1995

Subfamily of cricket-like animals

The Lipotactinae is a small subfamily of Asian bush crickets or katydids; it was originally included with the "Meconematidae".

The two genera can be found in southern China, Indo-China, and Malesia.

== Genera ==
The Orthoptera species file includes:

1. †Eomortoniellus Zeuner, 1936
2. Lipotactes Brunner von Wattenwyl, 1898 (China, Indo-China, Malesia)

Note: the previous genus Mortoniellus Griffini, 1909 from Malesia, is now a subgenus of Lipotactes.
