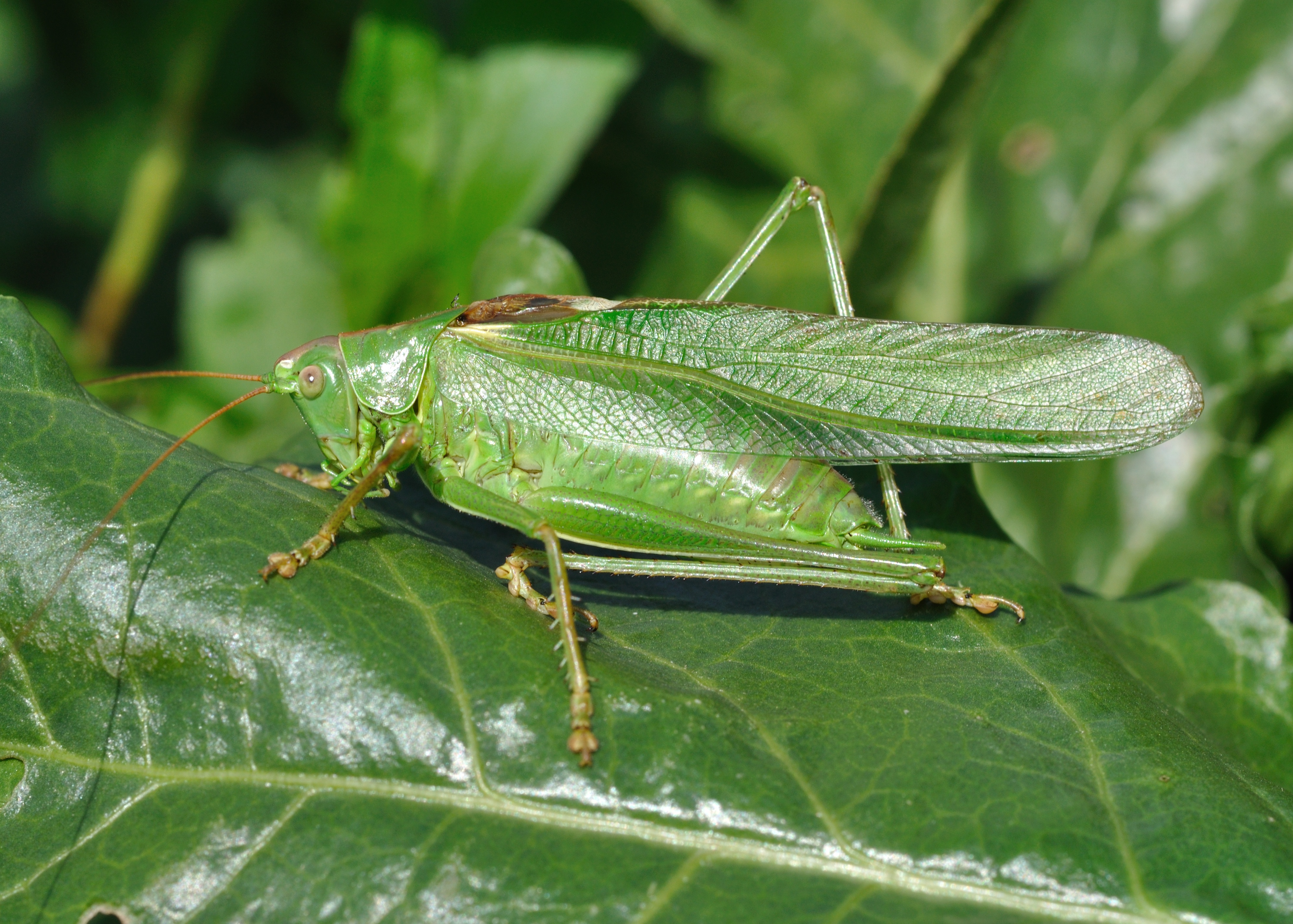
- Tettigonia viridissima

Scientific classification
- Kingdom: Animalia
- Phylum: Arthropoda
- Clade: Pancrustacea
- Class: Insecta
- Order: Orthoptera
- Suborder: Ensifera
- Infraorder: Tettigoniidea
- Superfamily: Tettigonioidea; Krauss, 1902
- Family: Tettigoniidae; Krauss, 1902

Subfamilies
- See text

Audio
- Stridulation of T. viridissima

= Tettigoniidae =

Tettigoniidae Temporal range: Paleogene–recent

Family of insects

Insects in the family Tettigoniidae are commonly called katydids (especially in North America) or bush crickets. They have previously been known as "long-horned grasshoppers". More than 8,000 species are known. Part of the suborder Ensifera, the Tettigoniidae are the only extant family in the superfamily Tettigonioidea.

Many species are nocturnal in habit, having strident mating calls and may exhibit mimicry or camouflage, commonly with shapes and colours similar to leaves.

== Etymology ==
The family name Tettigoniidae is derived from the genus Tettigonia, of which the great green bush cricket is the type species; it was first described by Carl Linnaeus in 1758. In Latin, tettigonia means a kind of small cicada, leafhopper; it is from the Greek τεττιγόνιον tettigonion, the diminutive of the imitative (onomatopoeic) τέττιξ, tettix, cicada. All of these names such as tettix with repeated sounds are onomatopoeic, imitating the stridulation of these insects. The common name "katydid" is also onomatopoeic and comes from the particularly loud, three-pulsed song, often rendered "ka-ty-did", of the nominate subspecies of the North American Pterophylla camellifolia, belonging to the subfamily Pseudophyllinae, which are known as "true katydids".

== Description and lifecycle ==
=== Description ===
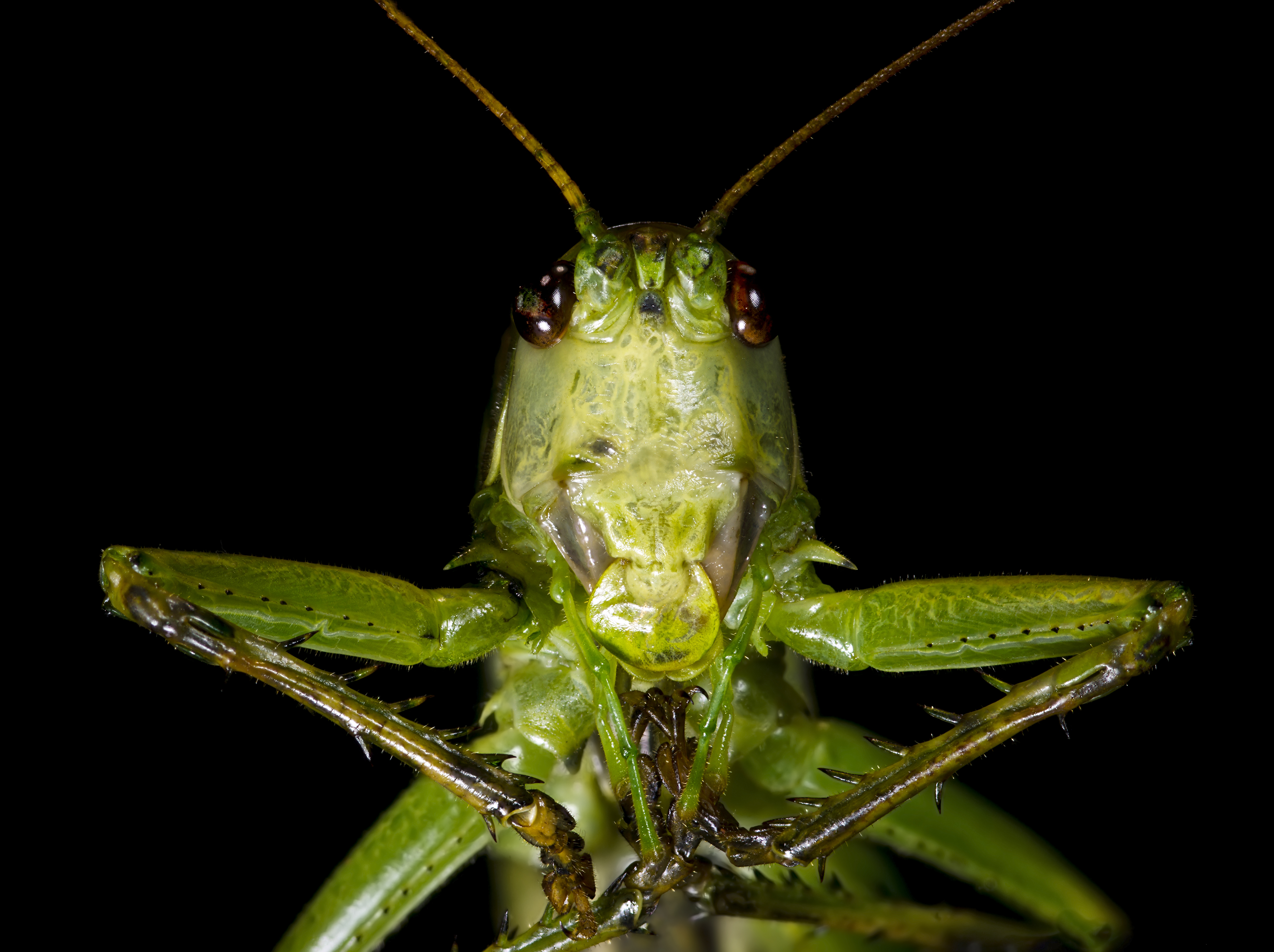
Tettigonia viridissima

Tettigoniids range in size from as small as 5 mm (1/4 in) to as large as 130 mm (5 in). The smaller species typically live in drier or more stressful habitats, which may lead to their small size. The small size is associated with greater agility, faster development, and lower nutritional needs. Tettigoniids are tree-living insects that are most commonly heard at night during summer and early fall. Tettigoniids may be distinguished from grasshoppers by the length of their filamentous antennae, which may exceed their own body length, while grasshoppers' antennae are always relatively short and thickened.

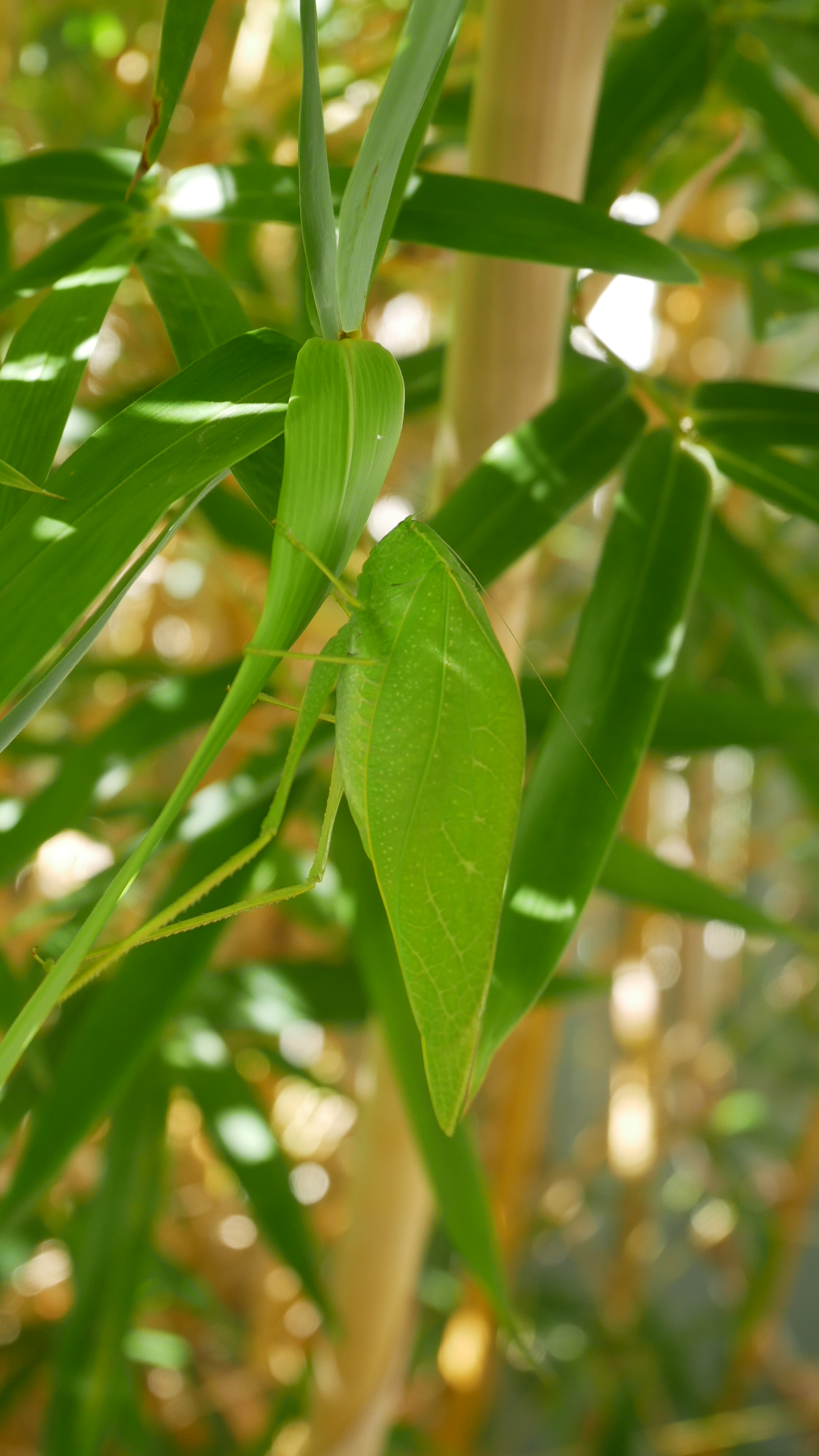
Katydid camouflaged on a bamboo leaf

=== Lifecycle ===
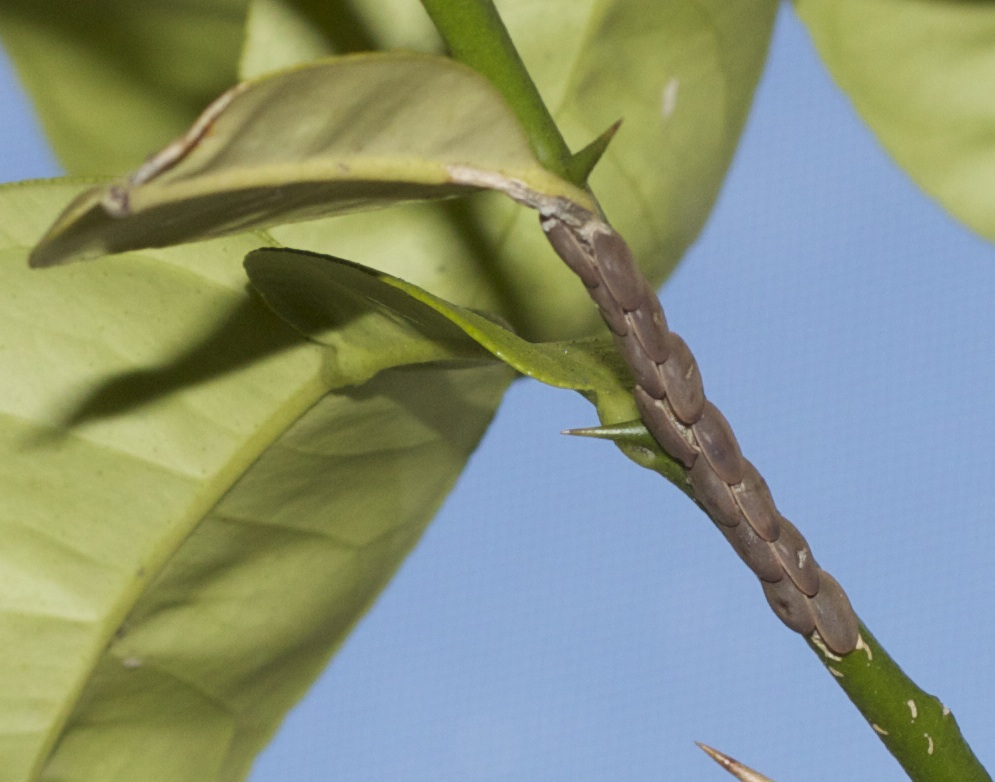
Katydid eggs attached in rows to a plant stem

Katydid nymph

Eggs are typically oval and may be attached in rows to plants. Where the eggs are deposited relates to the way the ovipositor is formed. It consists of up to three pairs of appendages formed to transmit the egg, to make a place for it, and place it properly. Tettigoniids have either sickle-shaped ovipositors, which typically lay eggs in dead or living plant matter, or uniformly long ovipositors, which lay eggs in grass stems. When tettigoniids hatch, the nymphs often look like small, wingless versions of the adults, but in some species, the nymphs look nothing at all like the adult and rather mimic other species such as ants, spiders, or assassin bugs, or flowers, to prevent predation. The nymphs remain in a mimic state only until they are large enough to escape predation. Once they complete their last molt (after about five successful molts), they are then prepared to mate.

== Distribution ==
Tettigoniids are found on every continent except Antarctica. Almost all katydid species live in the tropical regions of the world. For example, the Amazon basin tropical forests are home to over 2,000 species. However, katydids are found in the cool, dry temperate regions, as well, with about 255 species in North America.

== Classification ==
The Tettigoniidae are a large family and have been divided into a number of subfamilies:

- Austrosaginae (Australia)
- Bradyporinae (southeast Europe, west & central Asia)
- Conocephalinae (global)
- Hetrodinae (Africa)
- Hexacentrinae (pantropical, especially Asia)
- Lipotactinae (Asia)
- Listroscelidinae (Americas, Madagascar, Australia)
- Meconematinae (global)
- Mecopodinae (South America, Africa, Southeast Asia, Oceania)
- Microtettigoniinae (Australia)
- Phaneropterinae (global)
- Phasmodinae (Australia)
- Phyllophorinae (Australasia)
- Pseudophyllinae (global)
- Pterochrozinae (Central and South America)
- Saginae (North America, Africa, Europe)
- Tettigoniinae (global)
- Tympanophorinae (Australia)
- Zaprochilinae (Australia)
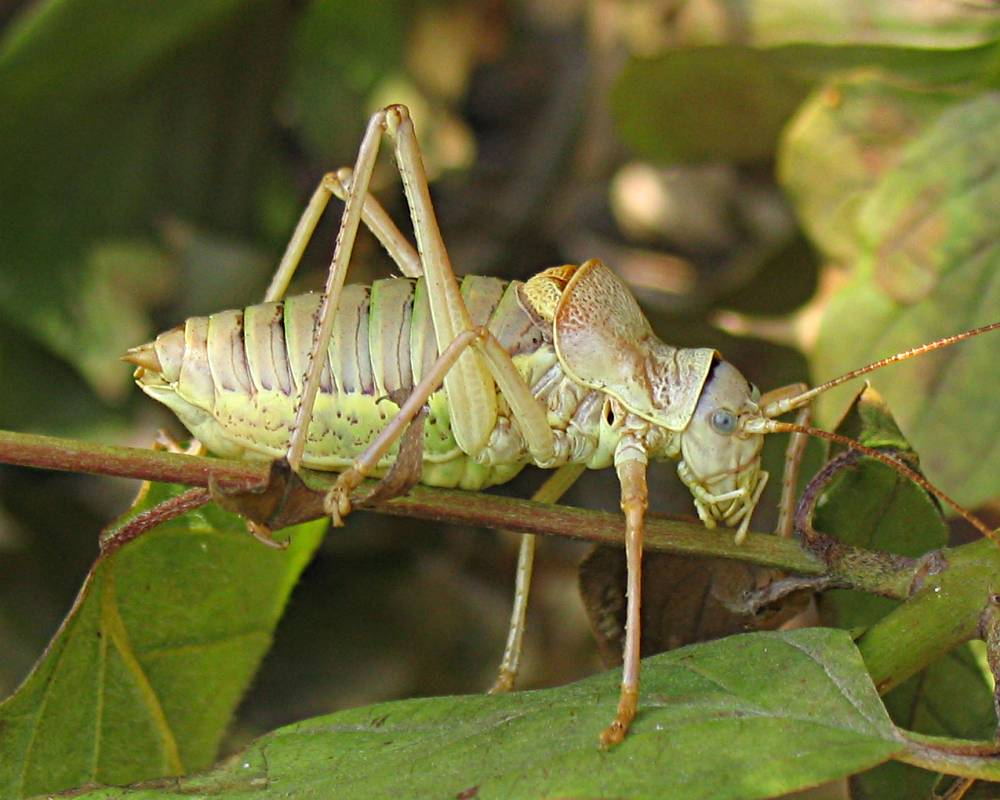
Ephippiger ephippiger
(Bradyporinae)

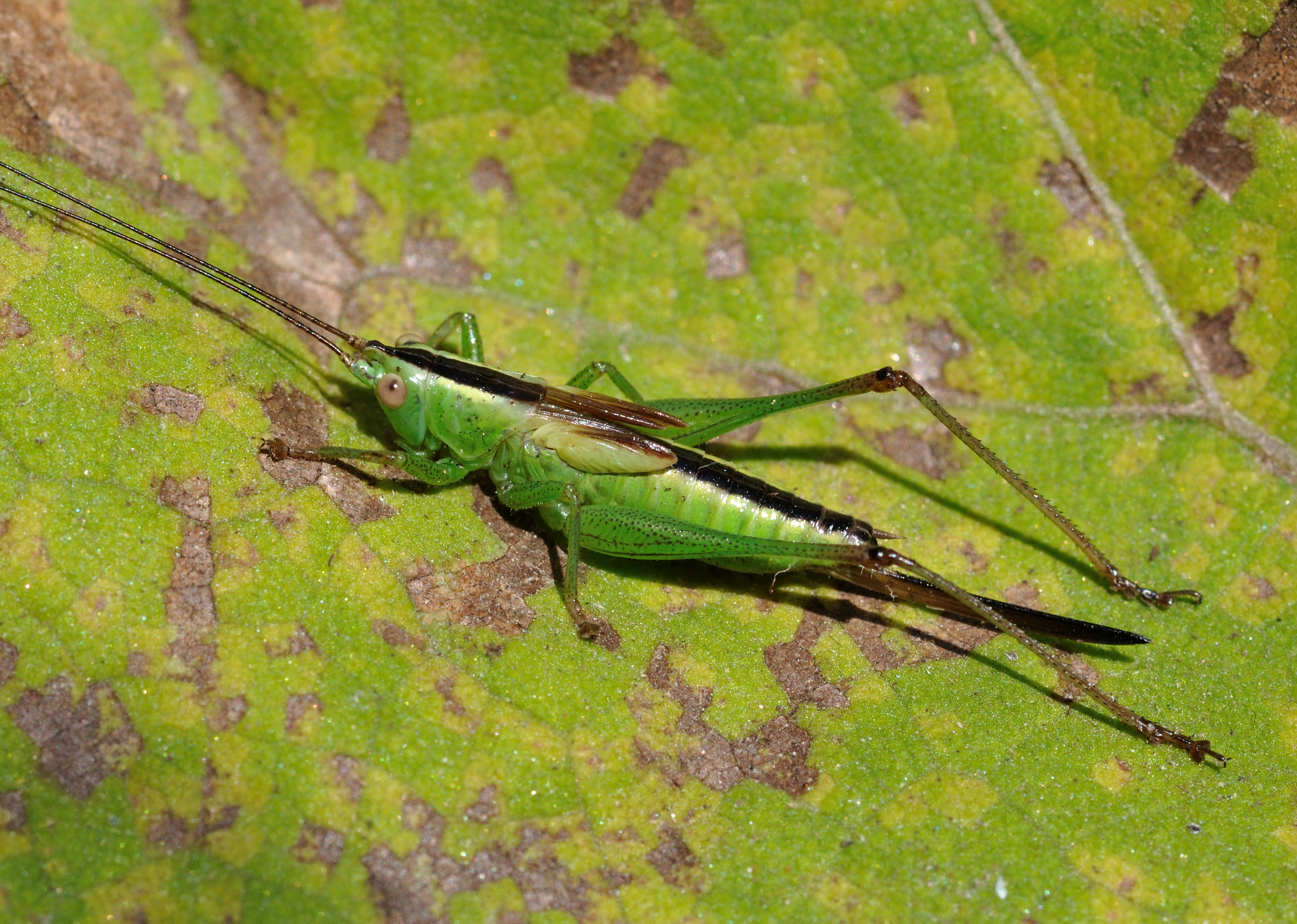
Conocephalus fuscus
(Conocephalinae)

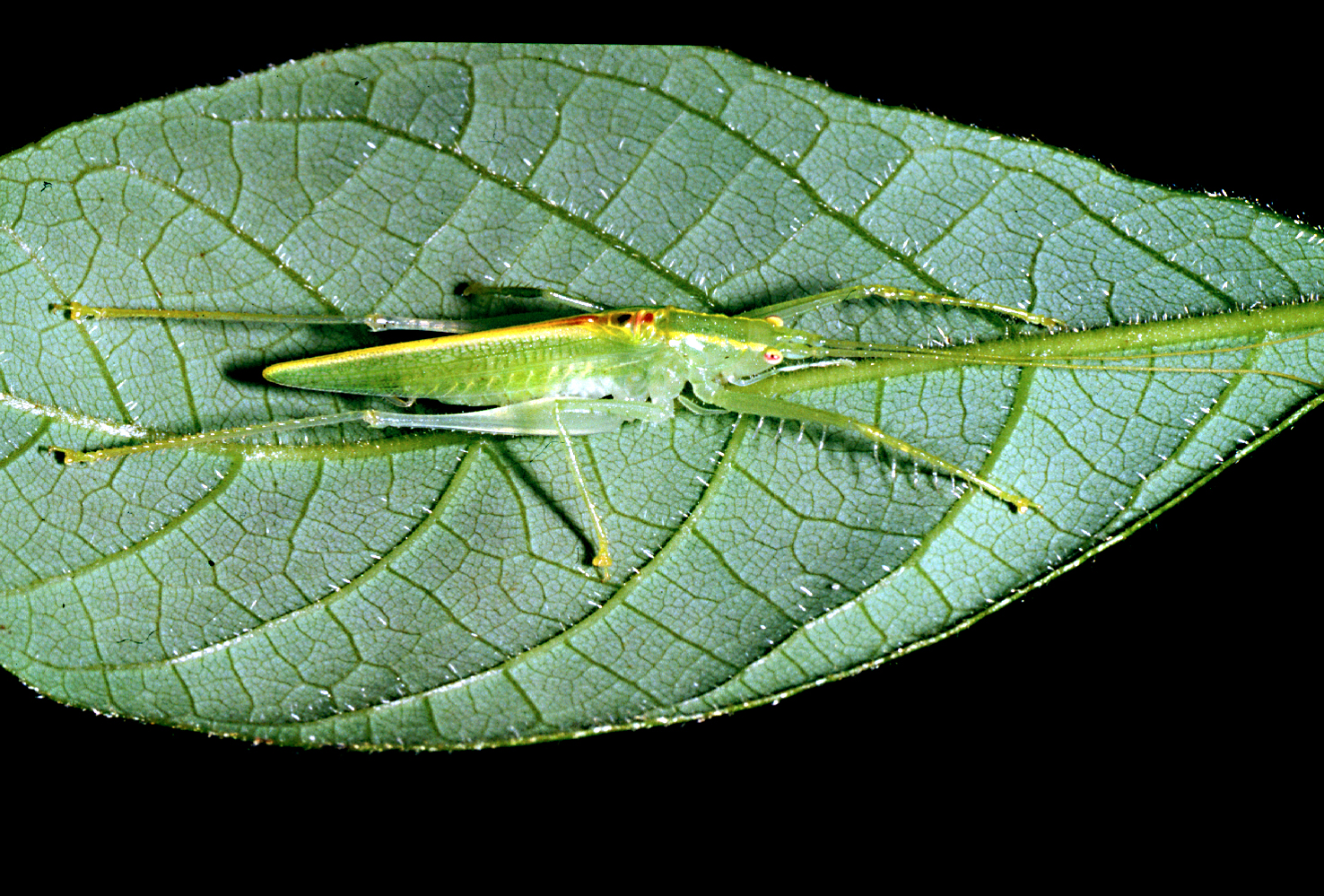
Paraphisis sp.
(Meconematinae)

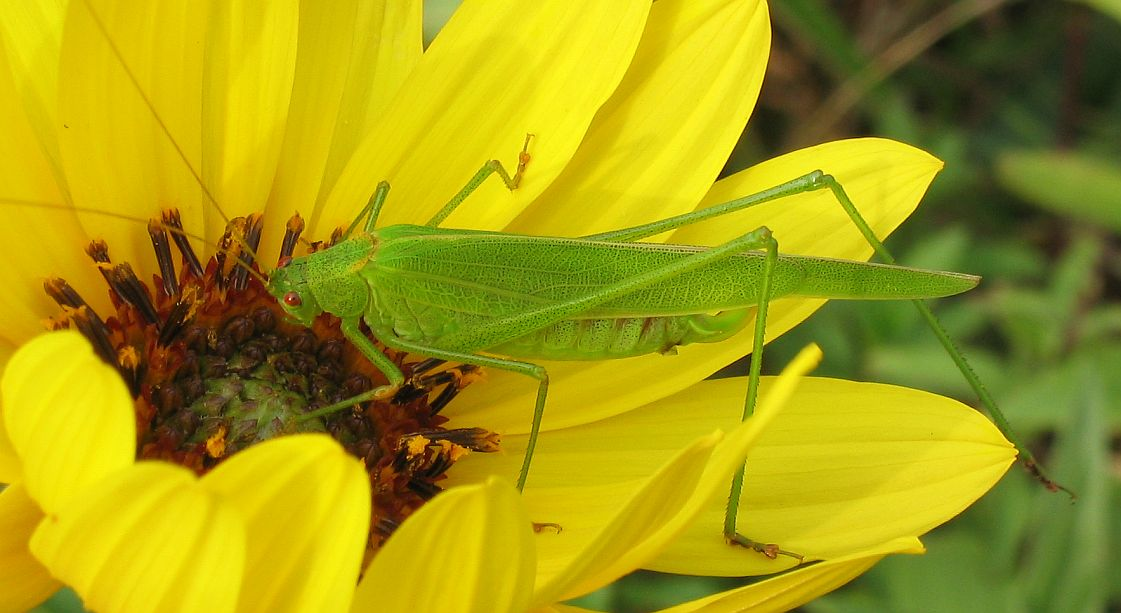
Phaneroptera falcata
(Phaneropterinae)

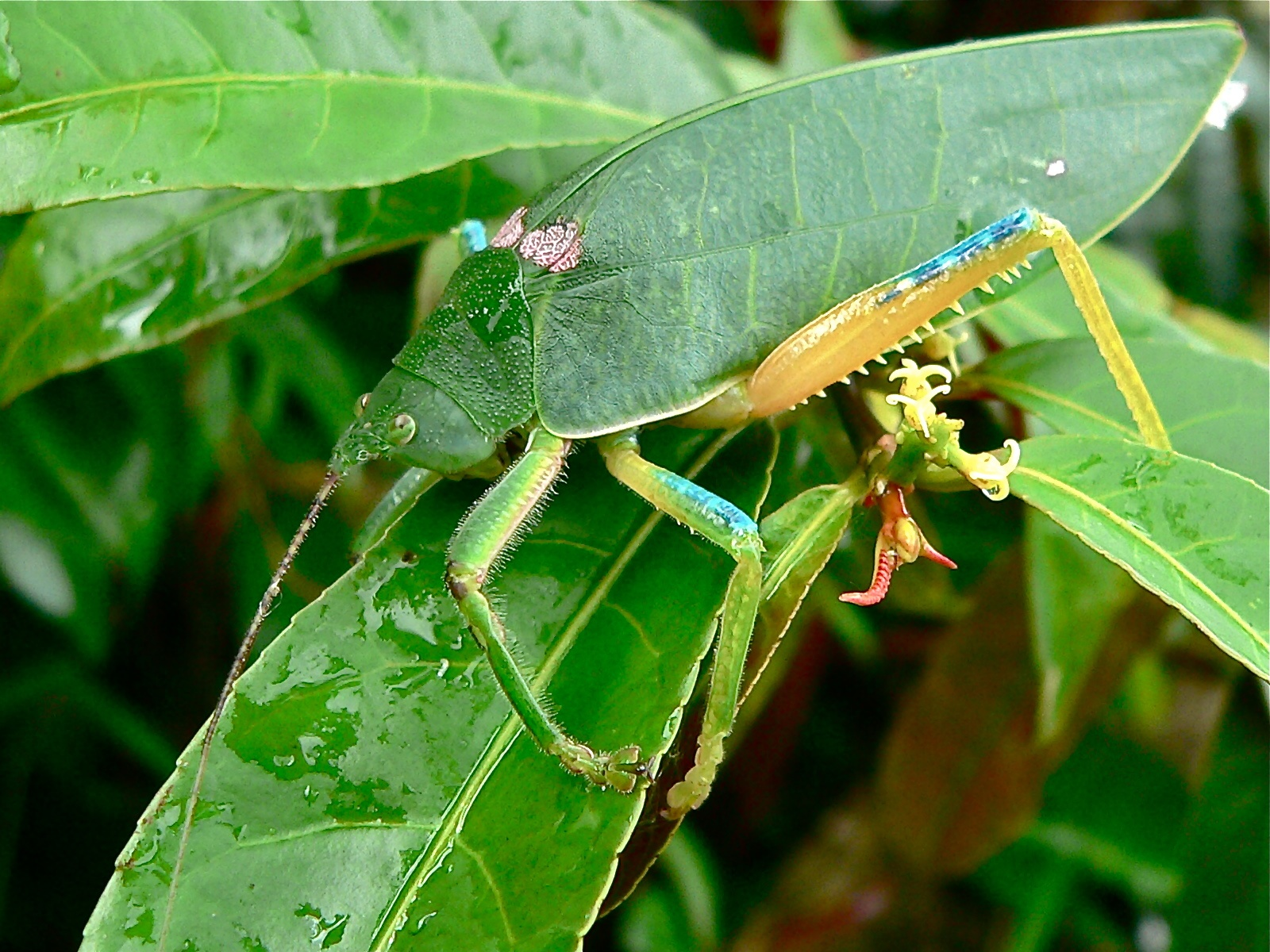
Pseudophyllus titan
(Pseudophyllinae)

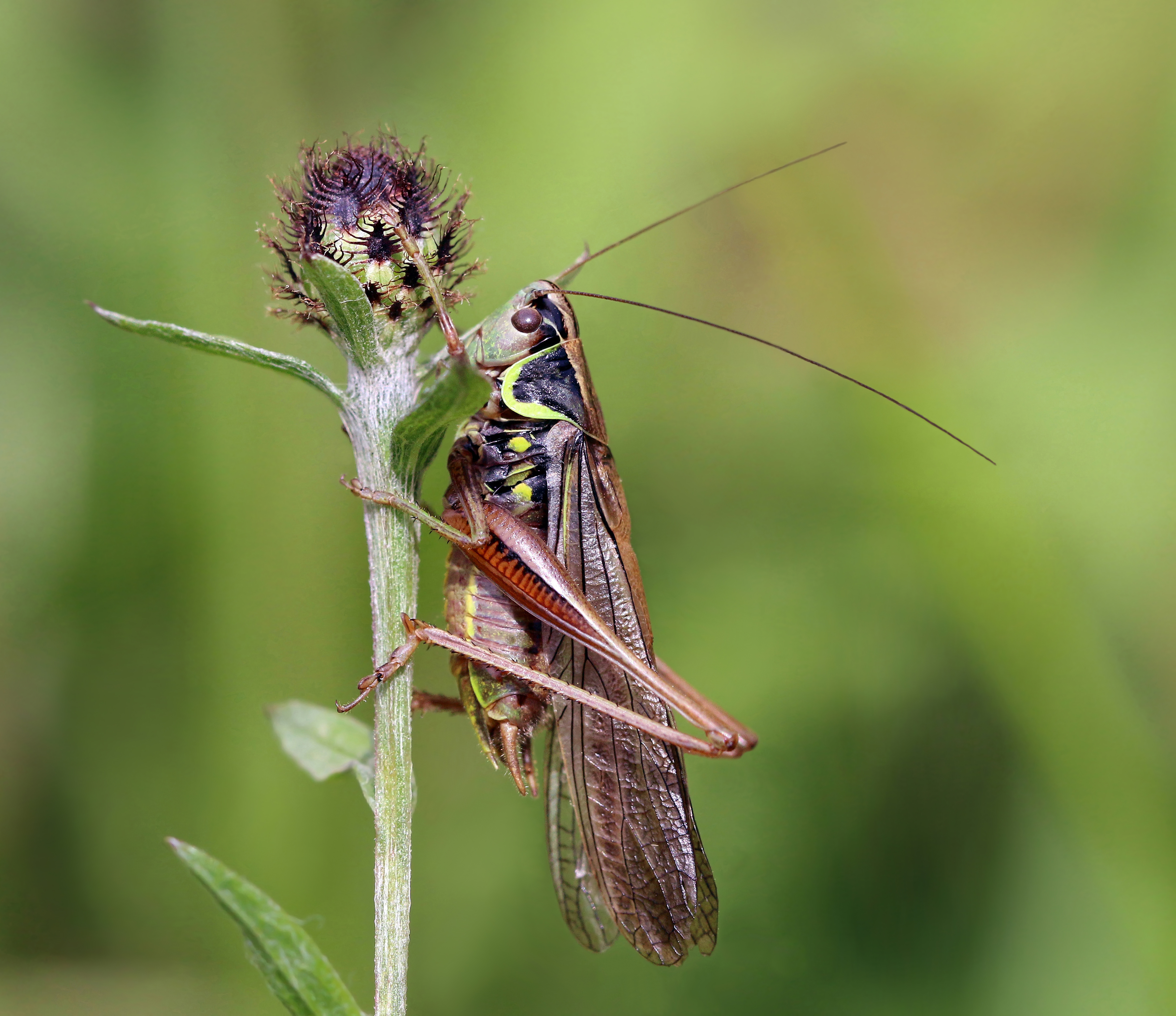
Metrioptera roeselii
(Tettigoniinae)

The Copiphorinae were previously considered a subfamily, but are now placed as tribe Copiphorini in the subfamily Conocephalinae. The genus Acridoxena is now placed in the tribe Acridoxenini of the Mecopodinae (previously its own subfamily, Acridoxeninae).

=== Evolution ===
The oldest fossils attributable to modern Tettigoniidae are no older than the Cenozoic, with among the oldest fossils being Arctolocusta groenlandica from the Paleocene of Greenland, around 61 million years ago, Pseudotettigonia amoena from the early Eocene Fur Formation of Denmark (c. 55 million years ago), and P. leona from the 46 million-year-old Middle Eocene Kishenehn Formation of Montana. One study suggested that the tettigoniids crown group originated around the time of the Cretaceous-Paleocene boundary, while another suggested they had already begun radiating during the Late Cretaceous. They are thought to have diverged from other ensiferans during the Jurassic.

=== Extinct taxa ===
The Orthoptera Species File lists:

- †Pseudotettigoniinae (North America, Europe)
- †Rammeinae (Europe)
- †Tettigoidinae (Australia)

Genera incertae sedis

- †Locustites Heer, 1849: 3 spp.
- †Locustophanes Handlirsch, 1939: †L. rhipidophorus Handlirsch, 1939
- †Prophasgonura Piton, 1940: †P. lineatocollis Piton, 1940
- †Protempusa Piton, 1940: †P. incerta Piton, 1940
- †Prototettix Giebel, 1856: †P. lithanthraca (Goldenberg, 1854)

The genus †Triassophyllum is extinct and may be placed here or in the Archaeorthoptera.

== Ecology ==
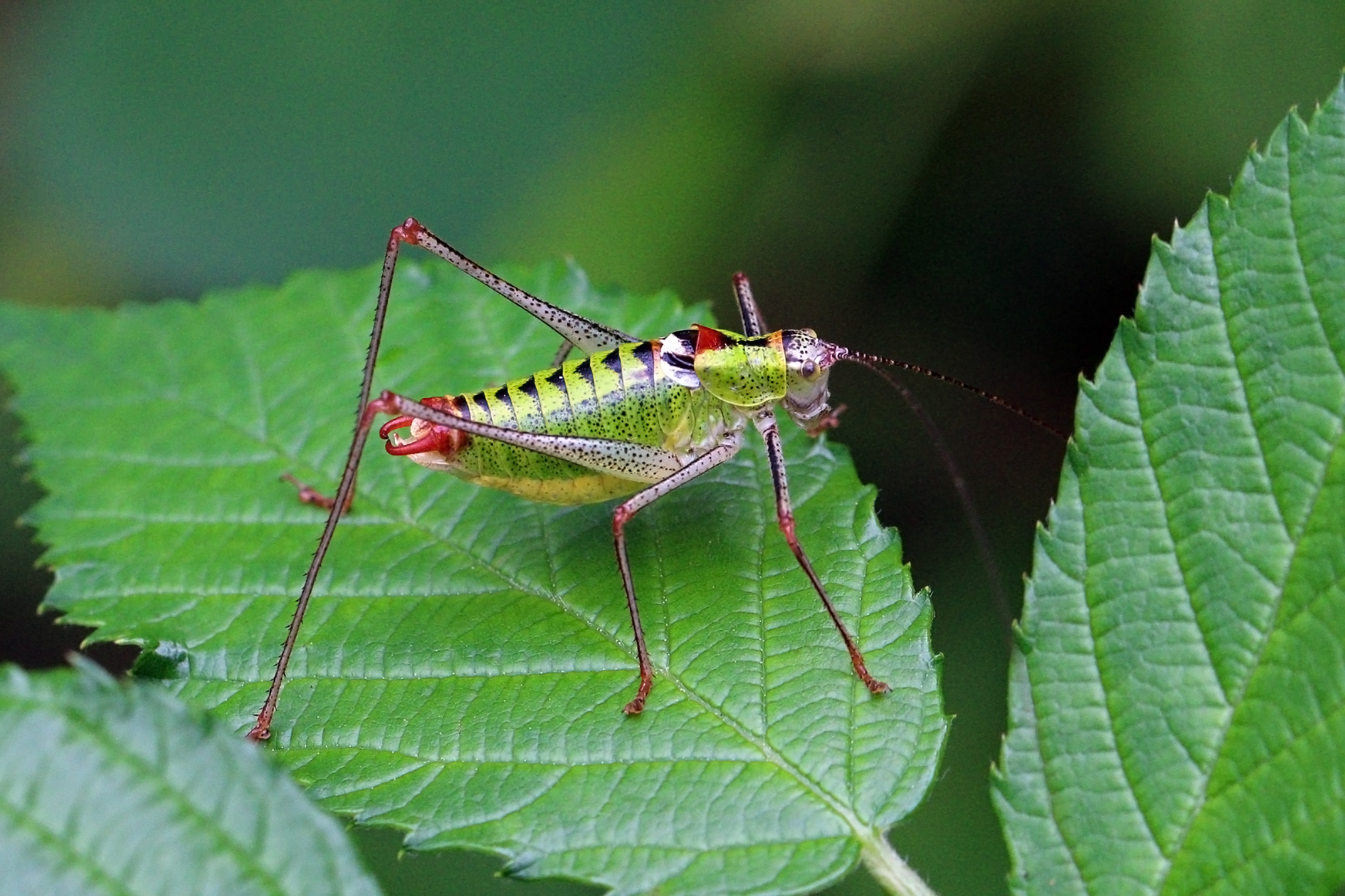
Poecilimon thoracicus (Phaneropterinae)

The diet of most tettigoniids includes leaves, flowers, bark, and seeds, but many species are exclusively predatory, feeding on other insects, snails, or even small vertebrates such as lizards. Some are also considered pests by commercial crop growers and are sprayed to limit growth, but population densities are usually low, so a large economic impact is rare.

Tettigoniids are serious insect pests of karuka (Pandanus julianettii). The species Segestes gracilis and Segestidea montana eat the leaves and can sometimes kill trees. Growers will stuff leaves and grass in between the leaves of the crown to keep insects out.

By observing the head and mouthparts, where differences can be seen in relation to function, it is possible to determine what type of food the tettigoniids consume. Large tettigoniids can inflict a painful bite or pinch if handled, but seldom break the skin.

Some species of bush crickets are consumed by people, such as the nsenene (Ruspolia differens) in Uganda and neighbouring areas.

=== Communication ===
The males of tettigoniids have sound-producing organs located on the hind angles of their front wings. In some species, females are also capable of stridulation. Females chirp in response to the shrill of the males. The males use this sound for courtship, which occurs late in the summer. The sound is produced by rubbing two parts of their bodies together, called stridulation. In many cases this is done with the wings, but not exclusively. One body part bears a file or comb with ridges; the other has the plectrum, which runs over the ridges to produce a vibration. For tettigoniids, the fore wings are used to sing. Tettigoniids produce continuous songs known as trills. The size of the insect, the spacing of the ridges, and the width of the scraper all influence what sound is made.

Many species stridulate at a tempo which is governed by ambient temperature, so that the number of chirps in a defined period of time can produce a fairly accurate temperature reading. For American katydids, the formula is generally given as the number of chirps in 15 seconds plus 37 to give the temperature in degrees Fahrenheit.

=== Predation ===
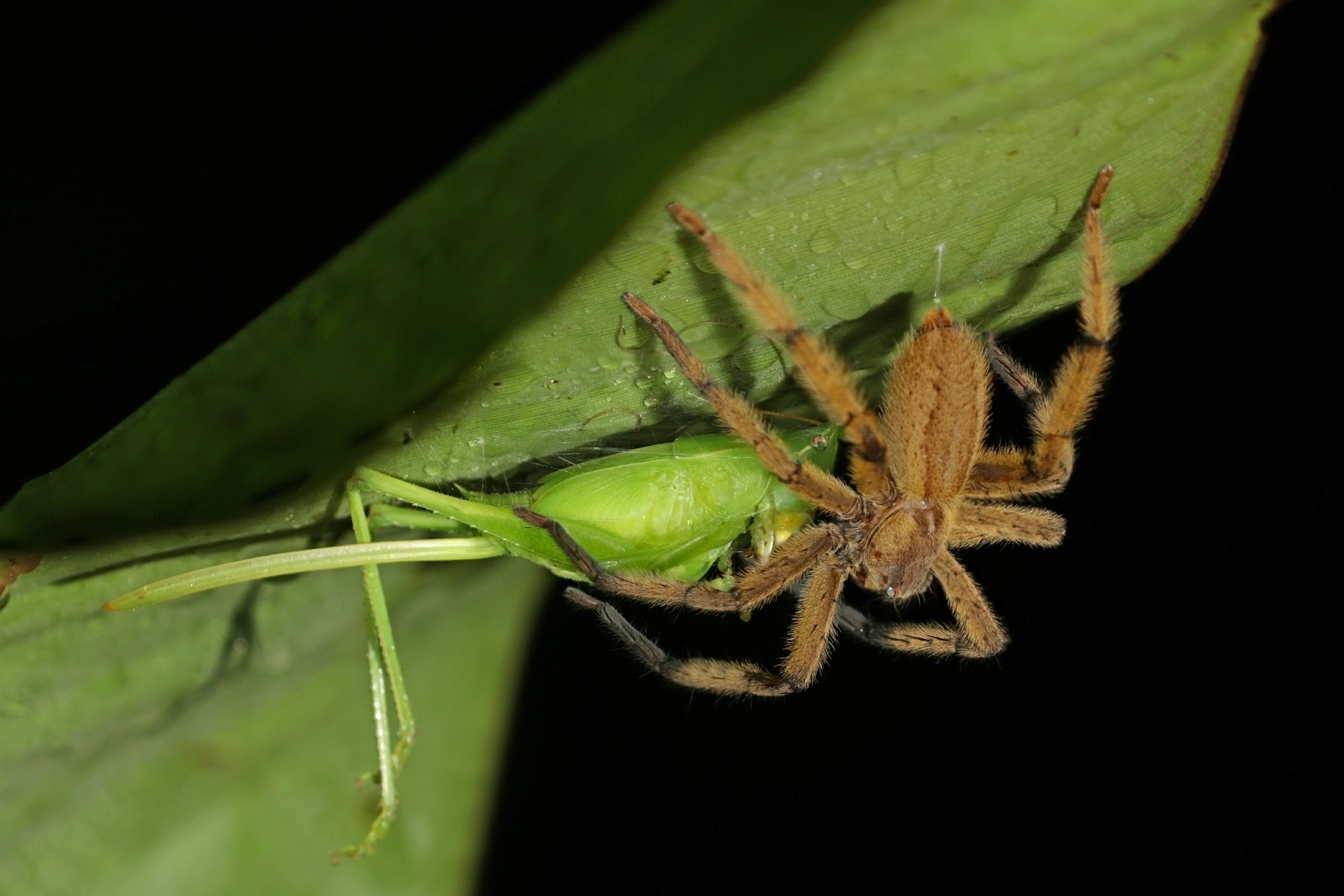
Wandering spider (Cupiennius sp.) with Tettigoniidae sp. prey

Some tettigoniids have spines on different parts of their bodies that work in different ways. The Listroscelinae have limb spines on the ventral surfaces of their bodies. This works in a way to confine their prey to make a temporary cage above their mouthparts. The spines are articulated and comparatively flexible, but relatively blunt. Due to this, they are used to cage and not penetrate the prey's body. Spines on the tibiae and the femora are usually more sharp and nonarticulated. They are designed more for penetration or help in the defensive mechanism they might have. This usually works with their diurnal roosting posture to maximize defense and prevent predators from going for their head.

=== Defense mechanisms ===
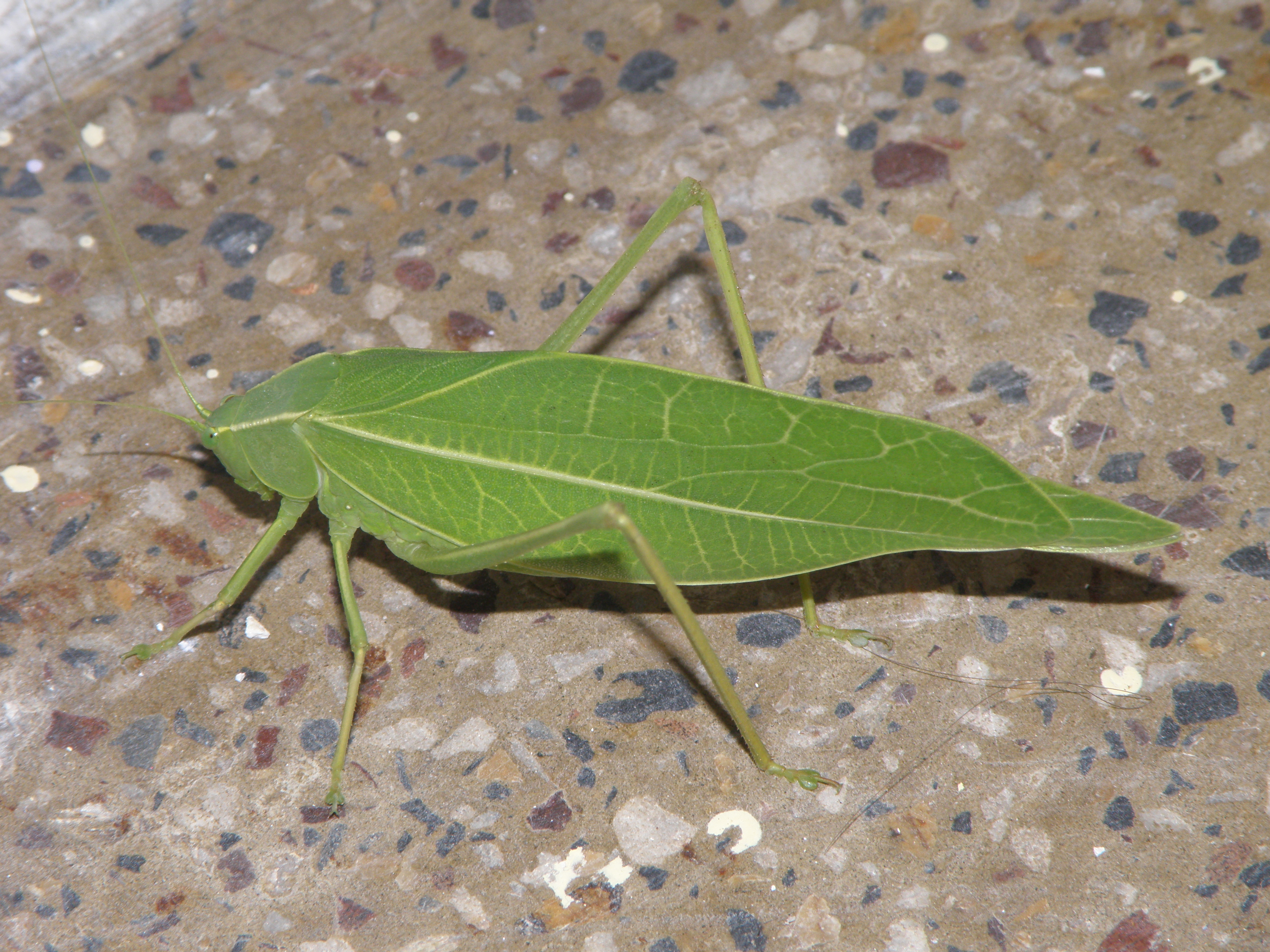
Katydid mimicking a leaf

A meadow katydid in Hawaii

When tettigoniids go to rest during the day, they enter a diurnal roosting posture to maximize their cryptic qualities. This position fools predators into thinking the katydid is either dead or just a leaf on the plant. Various tettigoniids have bright coloration and black apical spots on the inner surfaces of the tegmina, and brightly colored hind wings. By flicking their wings open when disturbed, they use the coloration to fool predators into thinking the spots are eyes. This, in combination with their coloration mimicking leaves, allows them to blend in with their surroundings, but also makes predators unsure which side is the front and which side is the back.

Katydid

I LOVE to hear thine earnest voice,
Wherever thou art hid,
Thou testy little dogmatist,
Thou pretty Katydid!
Thou mindest me of gentlefolks, -
Old gentlefolks are they, -
Thou say'st an undisputed thing
In such a solemn way.

Thou art a female, Katydid!
I know it by the trill
That quivers through thy piercing notes,
So petulant and shrill.
I think there is a knot of you
Beneath the hollow tree, -
A knot of spinster Katydids, -
Do Katydids drink tea?

O, tell me where did Katy live,
And what did Katy do?
And was she very fair and young,
And yet so wicked, too?
Did Katy love a naughty man,
Or kiss more cheeks than one?
I warrant Katy did no more
Than many a Kate has done.

— From the "To An Insect" poem by Oliver Wendell Holmes

To A Katydid

LITTLE friend among the tree-tops,
Chanting low your vesper hymns,
Never tiring,
Me inspiring,
Seated 'neath the swaying limbs,
Do you know your plaintive calling,
When the summer dew is falling,
Echoes sweeter through my brain
Than any soft, harmonic strain?

Others call you an intruder,
Say discordant notes you know;
Or that sadness,
More than gladness,
From your little heart doth flow;
And that you awake from sleeping
Thoughts in quiet they were keeping,
Faithless love, or ill-laid schemes,
Hopes unanchored — broken dreams.

No such phantoms to my vision
Doth your lullaby impart,
But sweet faces,
No tear traces,
Smile as joyous in my heart,
As when first at mother's knee
Learned I your sweet mystery.
I defend you with my praises,
For your song my soul upraises.

Oft I fancy when your neighbors,
In some secret thicket hid,
Are debating,
Underrating
What that little maiden did,
That above their clam'rous singing
I can hear your accents ringing,
Like a voice that must defend
From abuse some time-loved friend.

Dream I not of fame or fortune,
Only this I inward crave,
Sweet assurance,
Long endurance,
Of a love beyond the grave.
Should my songs die out and perish,
You'll my name repeat and cherish;
Though all trace is lost of me,
Still you'll call from tree to tree.

— From the "To A Katydid" poem by Kate Slaughter McKinney

== Reproductive behavior ==
The males provide a nuptial gift for the females in the form of a spermatophylax, a body attached to the males' spermatophore and consumed by the female, to distract her from eating the male's spermatophore and thereby increase his paternity.

=== Polygamy ===
The Tettigoniidae have polygamous relationships. The first male to mate is guaranteed an extremely high confidence of paternity when a second male couples at the termination of female sexual refractoriness. The nutrients that the offspring ultimately receive will increase their fitness. The second male to mate with the female at the termination of her refractory period is usually cuckolded.

=== Competition ===
The polygamous relationships of the Tettigoniidae lead to high levels of male-male competition. Male competition is caused by the decreased availability of males able to supply nutritious spermaphylanges to the females. Females produce more eggs on a high-quality diet; thus, the female looks for healthier males with a more nutritious spermatophylax. Females use the sound created by the male to judge his fitness. The louder and more fluent the trill, the higher the fitness of the male.

=== Stress response ===
In species which produce larger food gifts, the female often seeks out the males to copulate. This, however, is a cost to females as they risk predation while searching for males. Also, a cost-benefit tradeoff exists in the size of the spermatophore which the male tettigoniids produce. When males possess a large spermatophore, they benefit by being more highly selected for by females, but they are only able to mate one to two times during their lifetimes. Inversely, male Tettigoniidae with smaller spermatophores have the benefit of being able to mate two to three times per night, but have lower chances of being selected by females. Even in times of nutritional stress, male Tettigoniidae continue to invest nutrients within their spermatophores. In some species, the cost of creating the spermatophore is low, but even in those which it is not low, it is still not beneficial to reduce the quality of the spermatophore, as it would lead to lower reproductive selection and success. This low reproductive success is attributed to some Tettigoniidae species in which the spermatophylax that the female receives as a food gift from the male during copulation increases the reproductive output of the reproduction attempt. However, in other cases, the female receives few, if any, benefits.

The reproductive behavior of bush crickets has been studied in great depth. Studies found that the tuberous bush cricket (Platycleis affinis) has the largest testes in proportion to body mass of any animal recorded. They account for 14% of the insect's body mass and are thought to enable a fast remating rate.

== See also ==
- List of Orthopteroid genera containing species recorded in Europe
