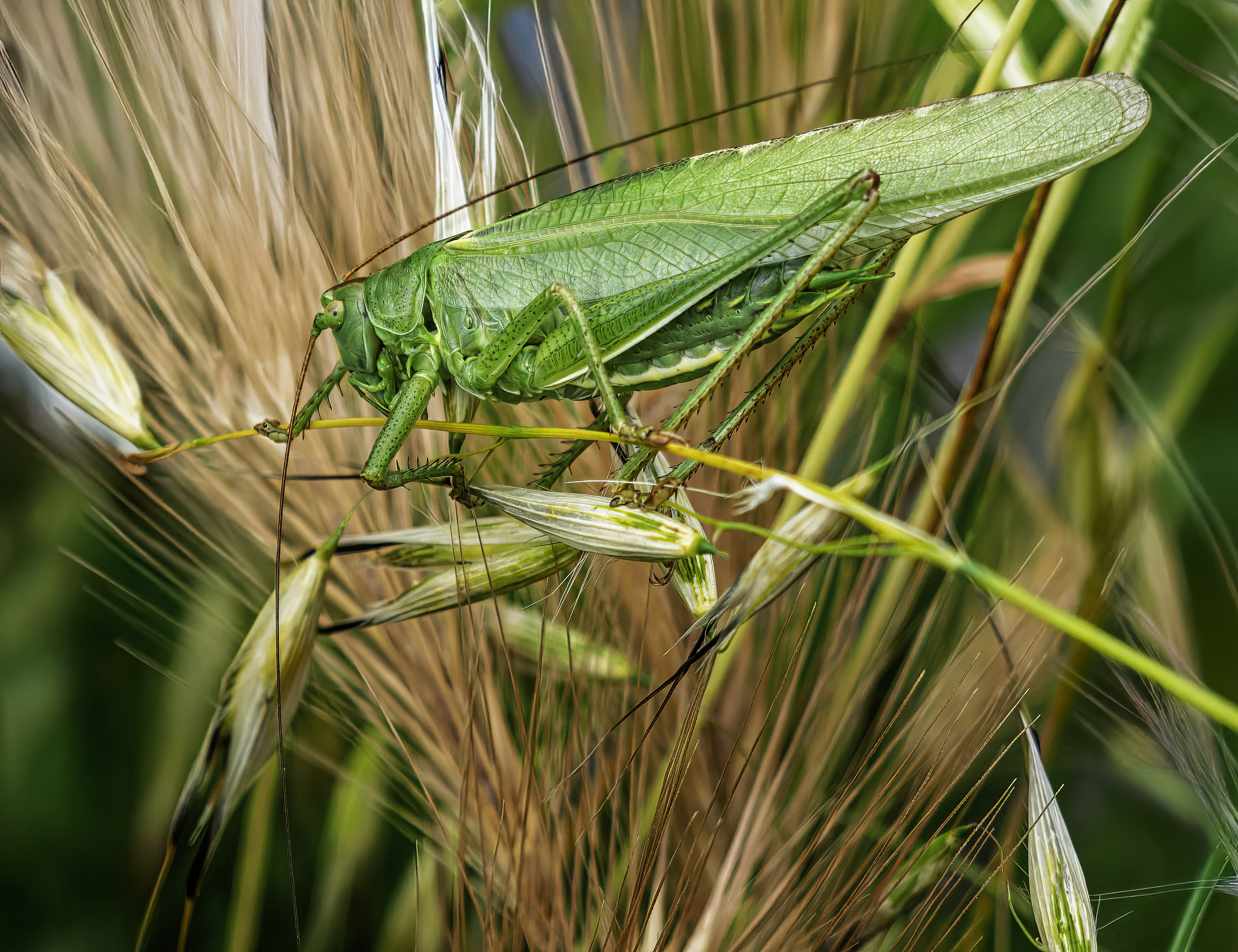
- T. viridissima, male

Scientific classification
- Kingdom: Animalia
- Phylum: Arthropoda
- Class: Insecta
- Order: Orthoptera
- Suborder: Ensifera
- Family: Tettigoniidae
- Subfamily: Tettigoniinae
- Tribe: Tettigoniini
- Genus: Tettigonia
- Species: T. viridissima

Binomial name
- Tettigonia viridissima (Linnaeus, 1758)

Synonyms
- Locusta viridissima (L., 1758); Gryllus viridissimus L., 1758; Phasgonura viridissima (L., 1758); Agraecia incognita Piza, 1970; Locusta maroccana Bolívar, 1893; Locusta viridis cantatrix De Geer, 1773; Locusta viridissima var. flava Nedelkov, 1907; Tettigonia viridis cantatrix (De Geer 1773); Tettigonia viridissima meridionalis (Shugurov 1912); Tettigonia caudata flava (Nedelkov 1907); Tettigonia longispina (Ingrisch 1983); Tettigonia longealata Chopard, 1937; Tettigonia paoli (Capra 1936); Tettigonia trinacriae (Jannone 1937); Tettigonia viridissima meridionalis Shugurov, 1912

= Tettigonia viridissima =

Great green bush-cricket

Species of cricket-like animal

Tettigonia viridissima, the great green bush-cricket, is a large species of bush-cricket belonging to the subfamily Tettigoniinae.

== Distribution and habitat ==
This species can be encountered in most of Europe, in the eastern Palearctic realm, in the Near East, and in North Africa, especially in meadows, grasslands, prairies and occasionally in gardens at an elevation up to 1,800 metres (5,900 ft) above sea level.

== Description ==
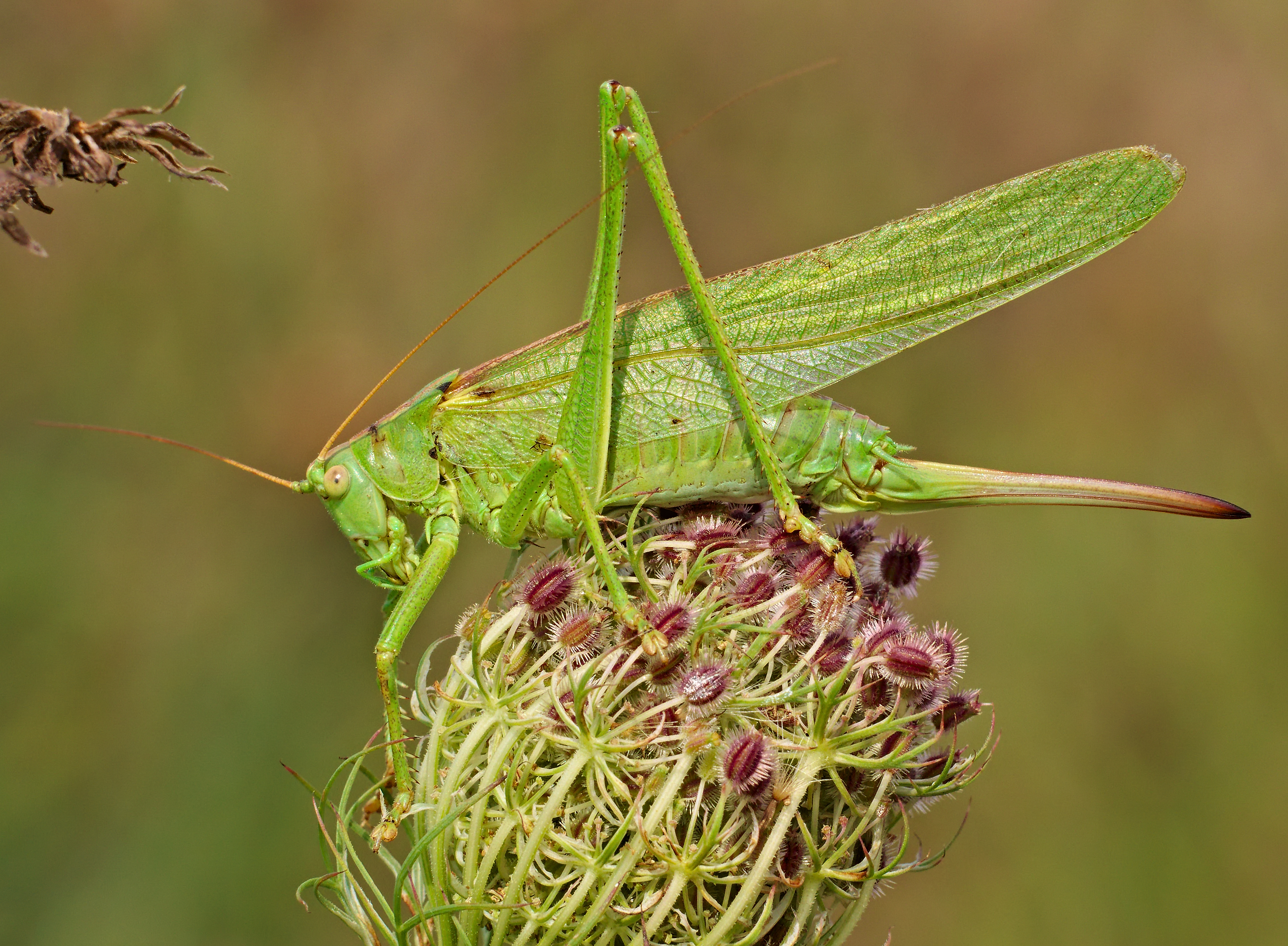
T. viridissima, female

The adult males grow up to 28–36 millimetres (1.1–1.4 in) long, while females reach 32–42 millimetres (1.3–1.7 in). This insect is most often completely green (but there are specimens completely yellowish or with yellow legs), excluding a rust-colored band on top of the body. The organ of the stridulation of the males is generally brown.

Tettigonia viridissima is distinguished by its very long and thin antennae, which can sometimes reach up to three times the length of the body, thus differentiating them from grasshoppers, which always carry short antennae. It could be confused with Tettigonia cantans, whose wings are a centimeter shorter than the ovipositor, or Tettigonia caudata, whose hind femurs bear conspicuous black spines.

The morphology of both sexes is very similar, but the female has an egg-laying organ (ovipositor) that can reach a length of 23–32 millimetres (0.91–1.26 in). It reaches the end of the elytra and is slightly curved downward.

The larvae are green and the imago show a thin brown longitudinal stripe on their back. The ovipositor can be seen from the fifth stage; the wings appear in both genders from the sixth stage.

== Biology ==
Tettigonia viridissima is carnivorous and arboreal. Its diet is mostly composed of flies, caterpillars and larvae. Unlike grasshoppers, it is essentially active by day and night, as testified by its endless crepuscular and nocturnal singing. The species can bite painfully but is not particularly aggressive. It is best to avoid holding the insect in the fist, as that almost guarantees a bite. They can fly, but they tend to avoid flying where possible. Most often they move "on foot" or jump, which allows them to travel about in bushes and trees.

Sound of Tettigonia viridissima
Field recording in the Netherlands 35s

== Gallery ==
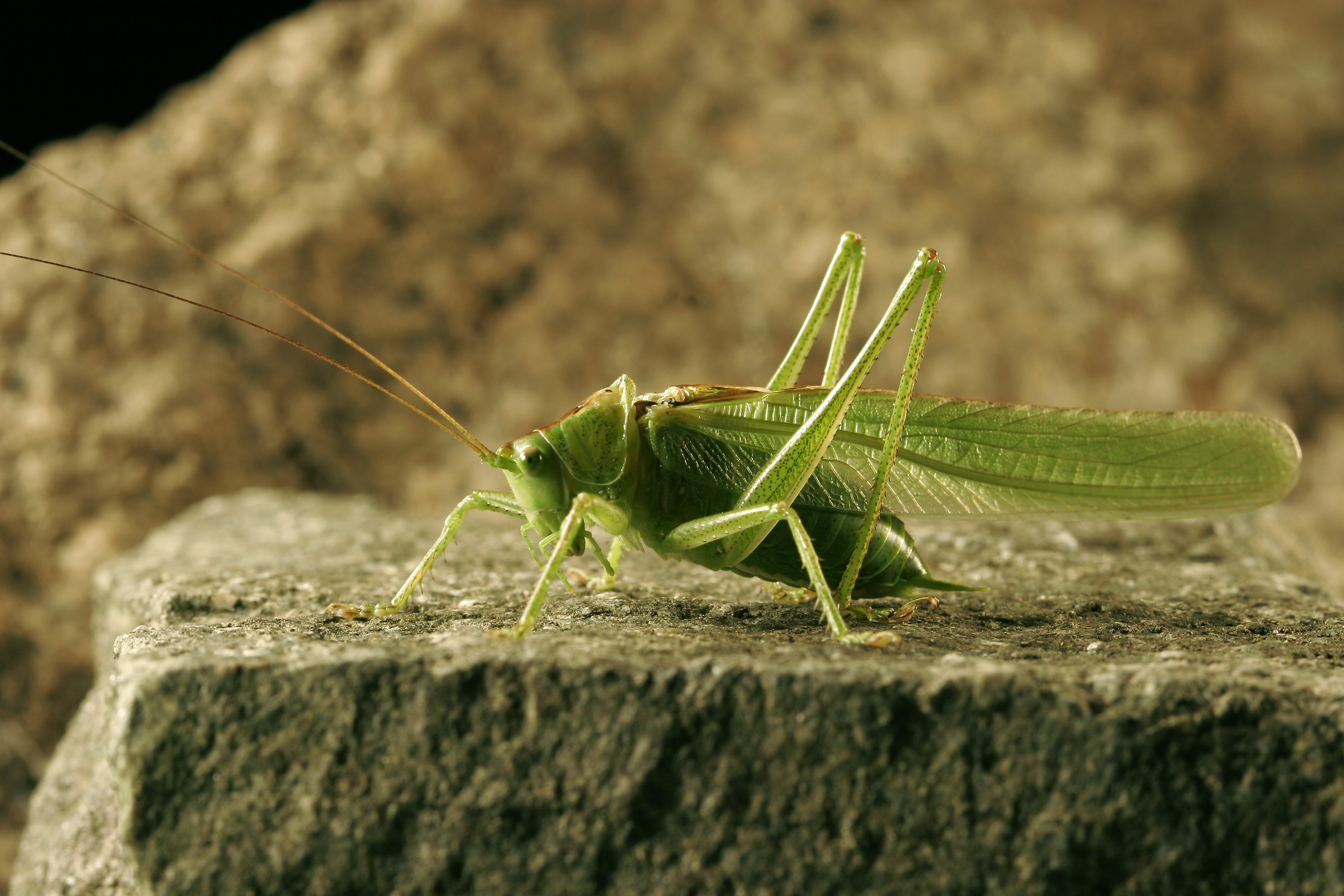
Males can be recognized by the absence of the ovipositor

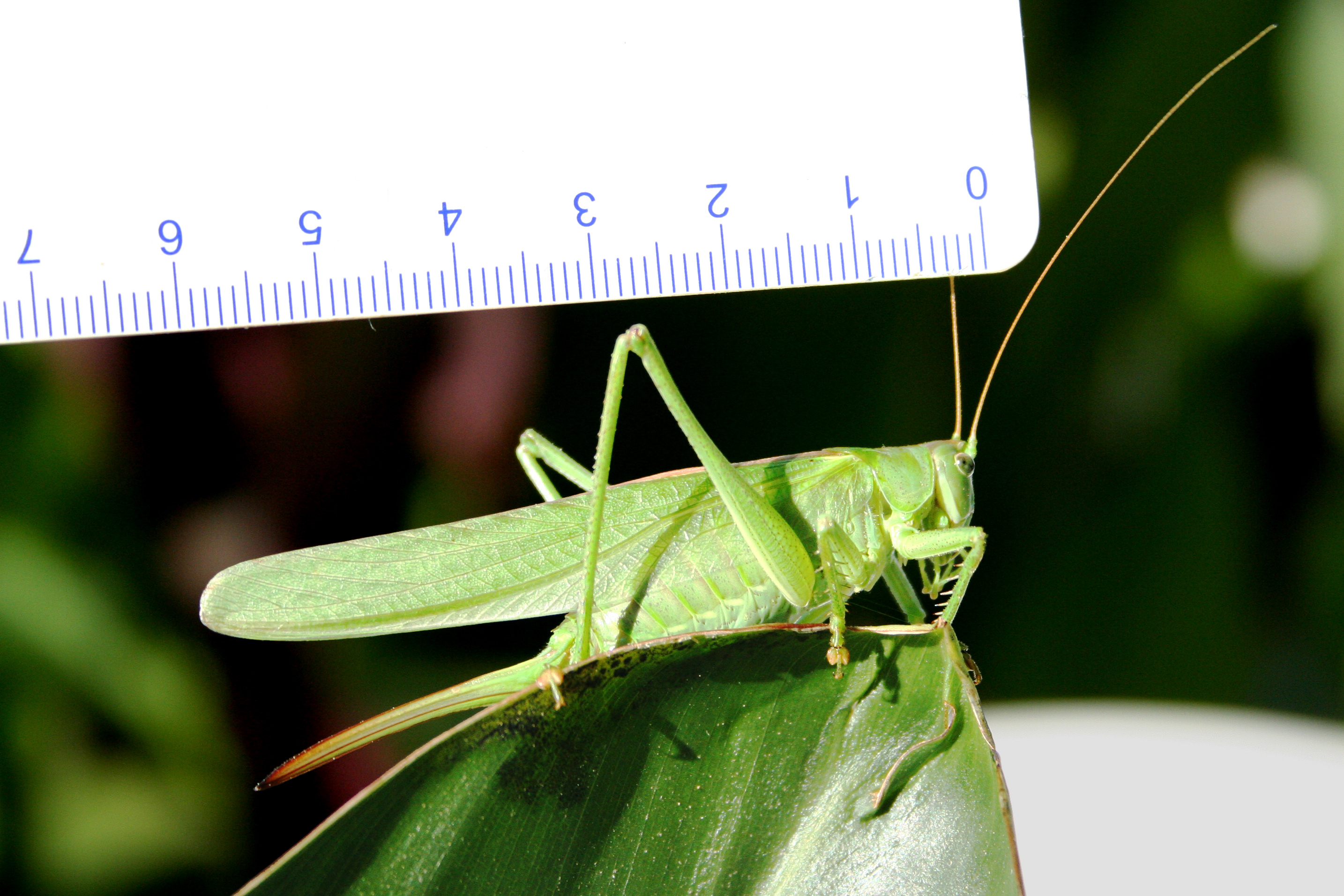
Females can be recognized by the ovipositor

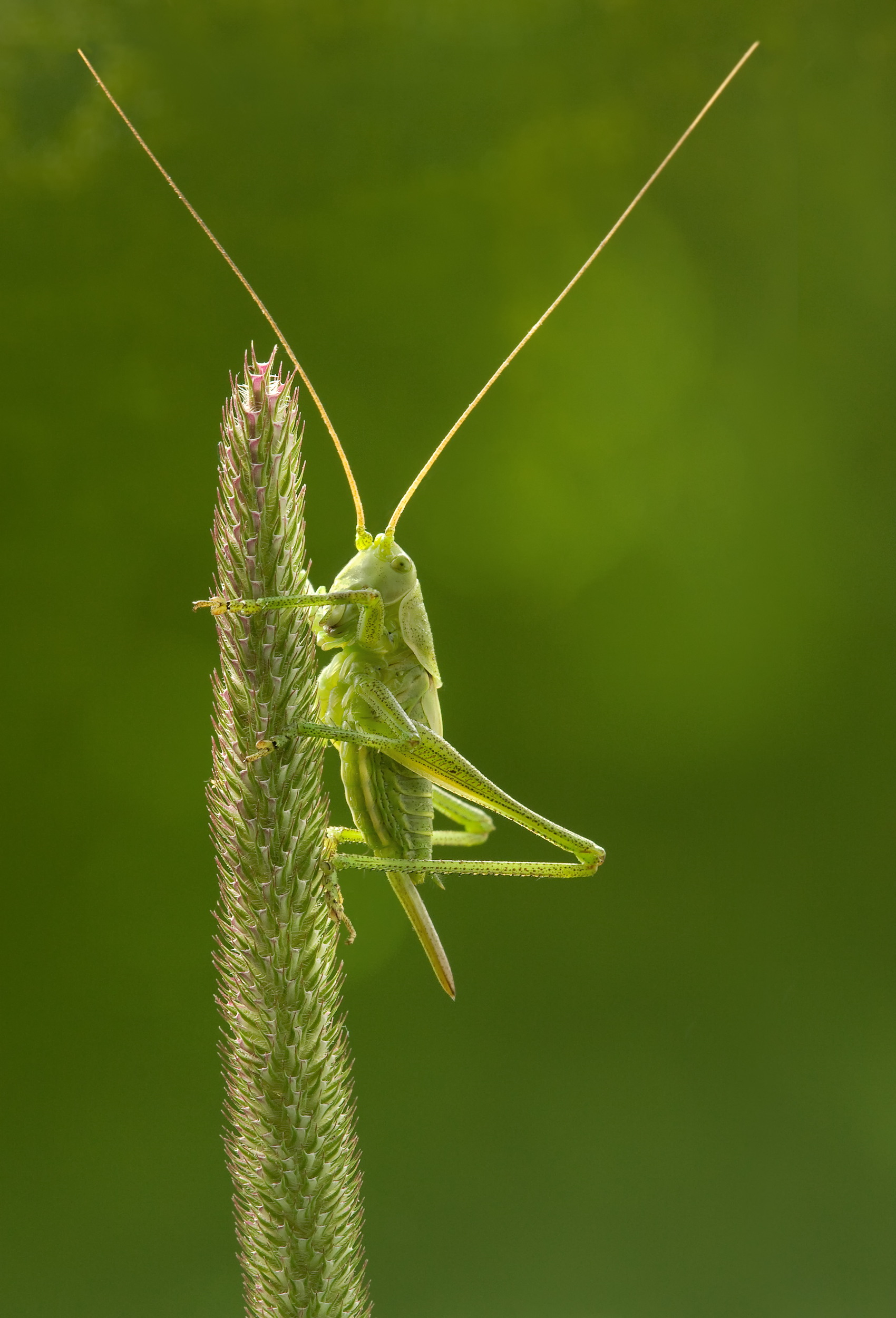
Nymph on Phleum pratense

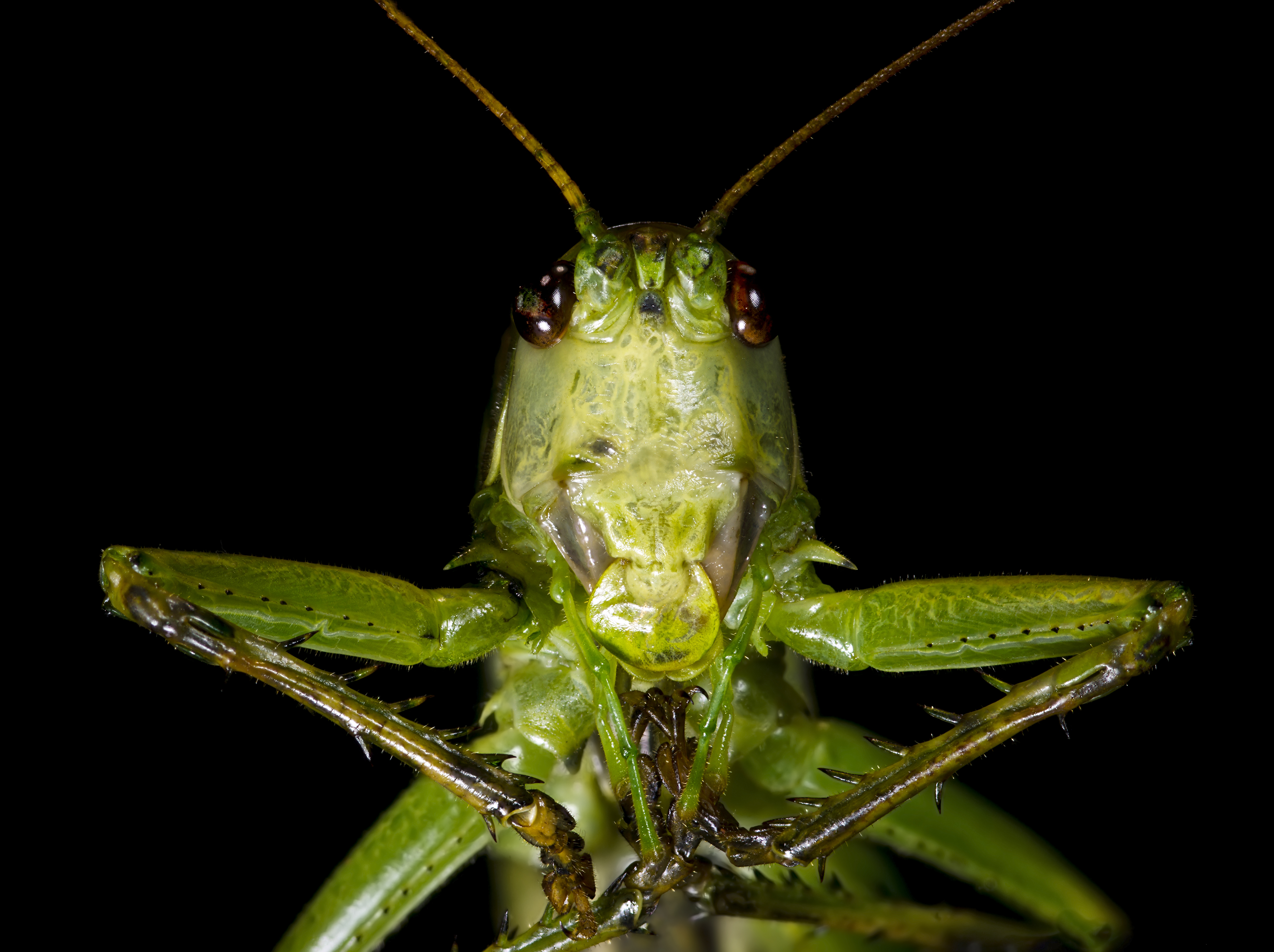
Anatomy of the head

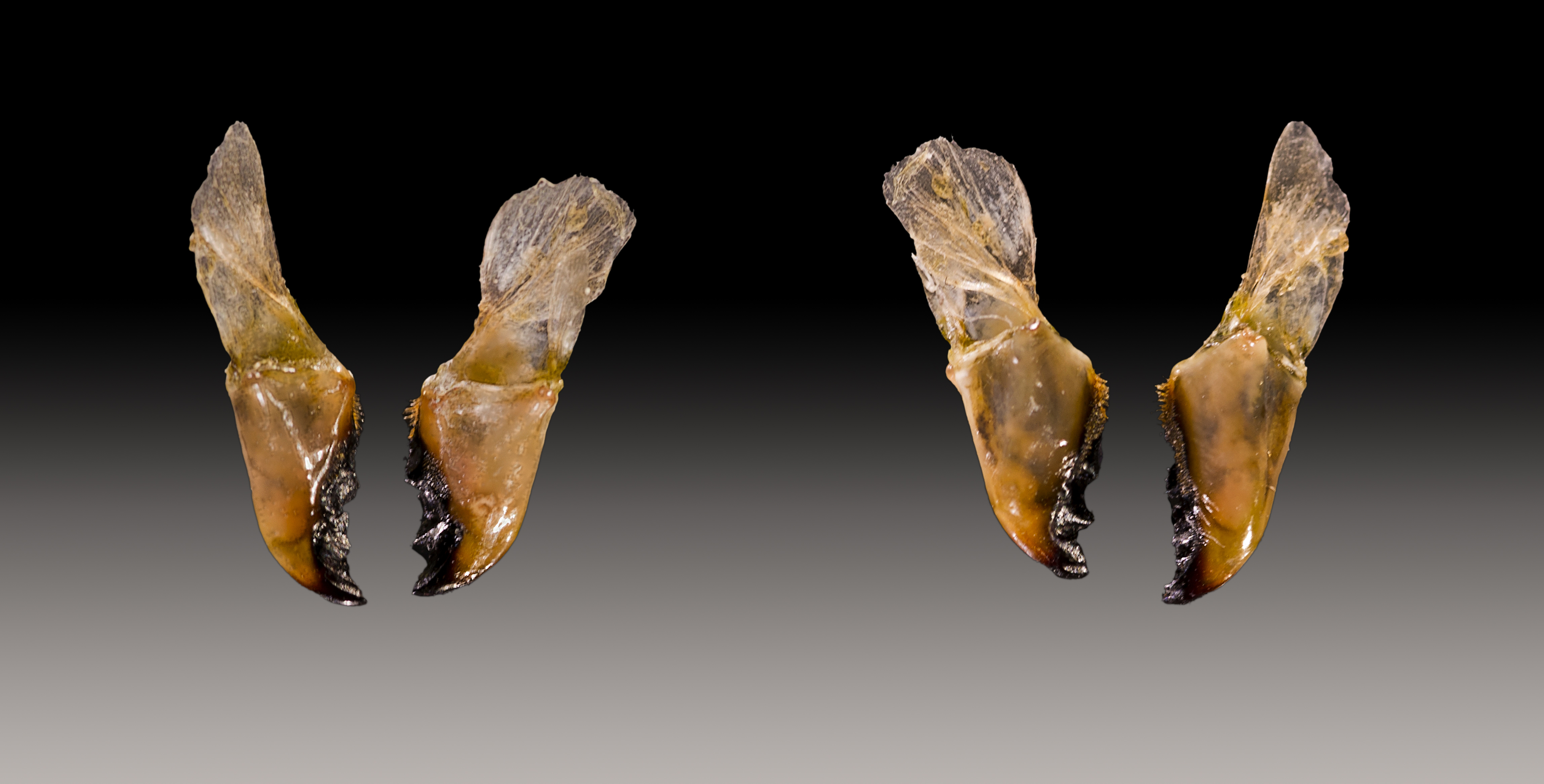
Mandibles

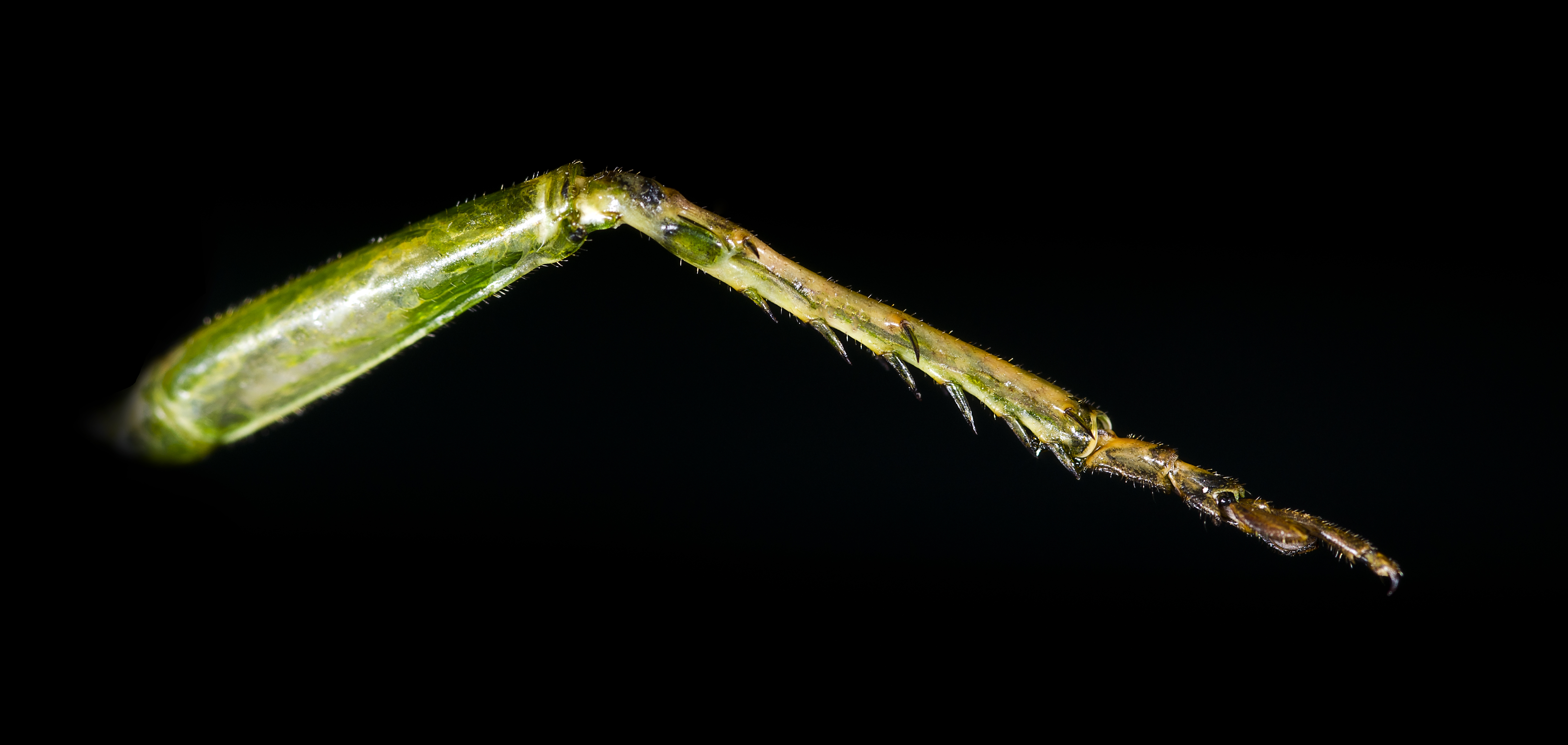
Hearing bubble on the forelimb

Close-Up of a Tettigonia viridissima

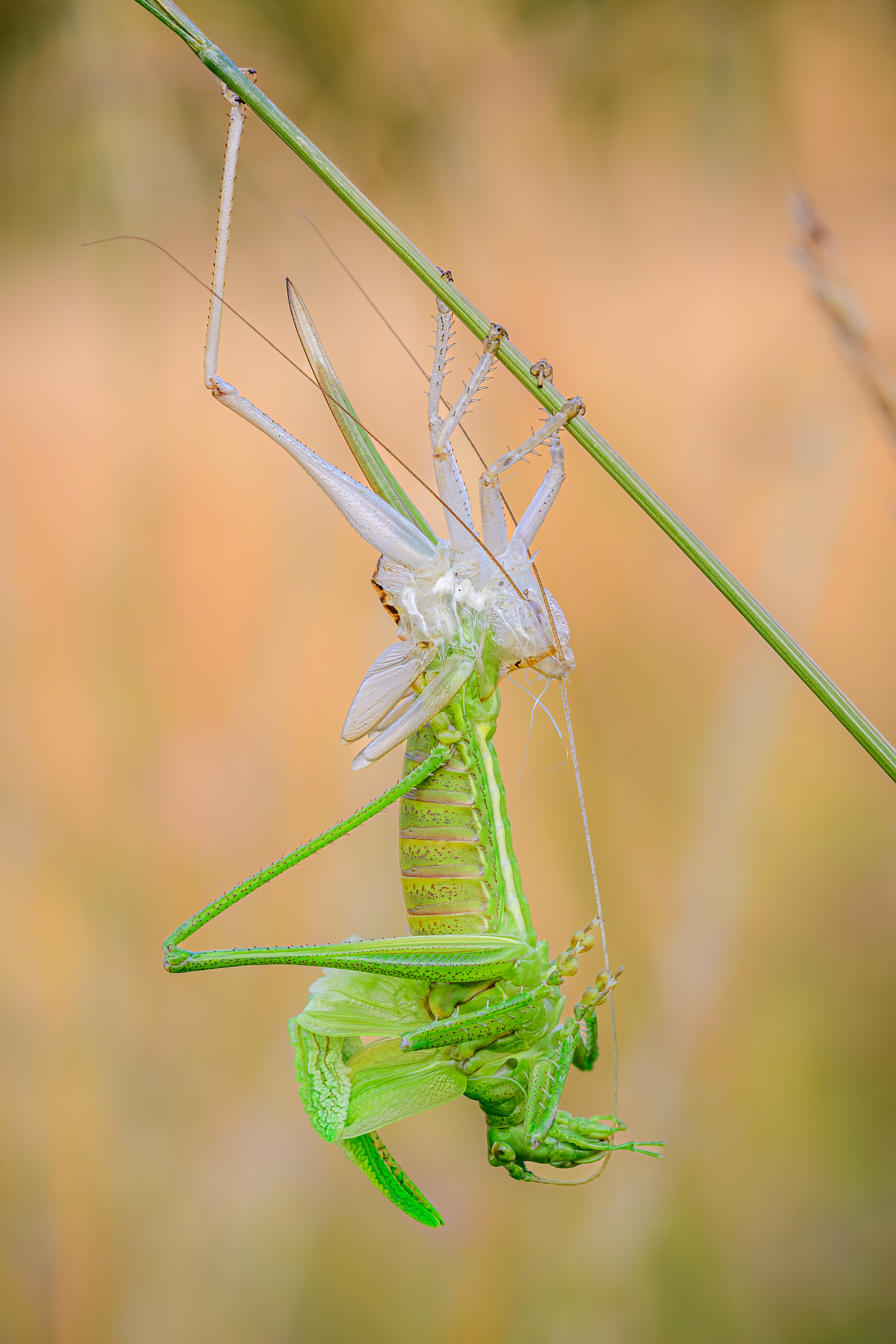
Female during ecdysis (molting)

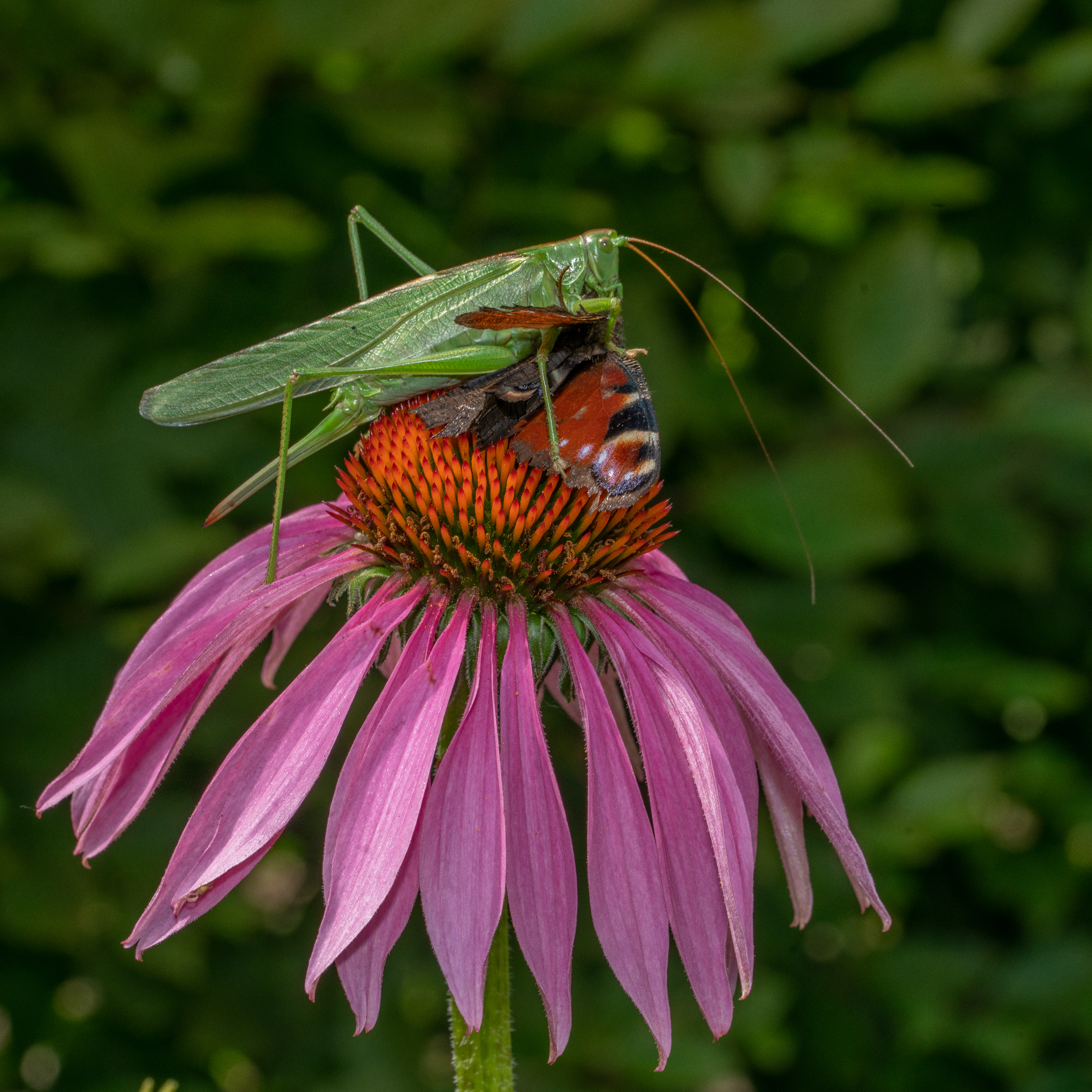
Tettigonia viridissima eating a butterfly

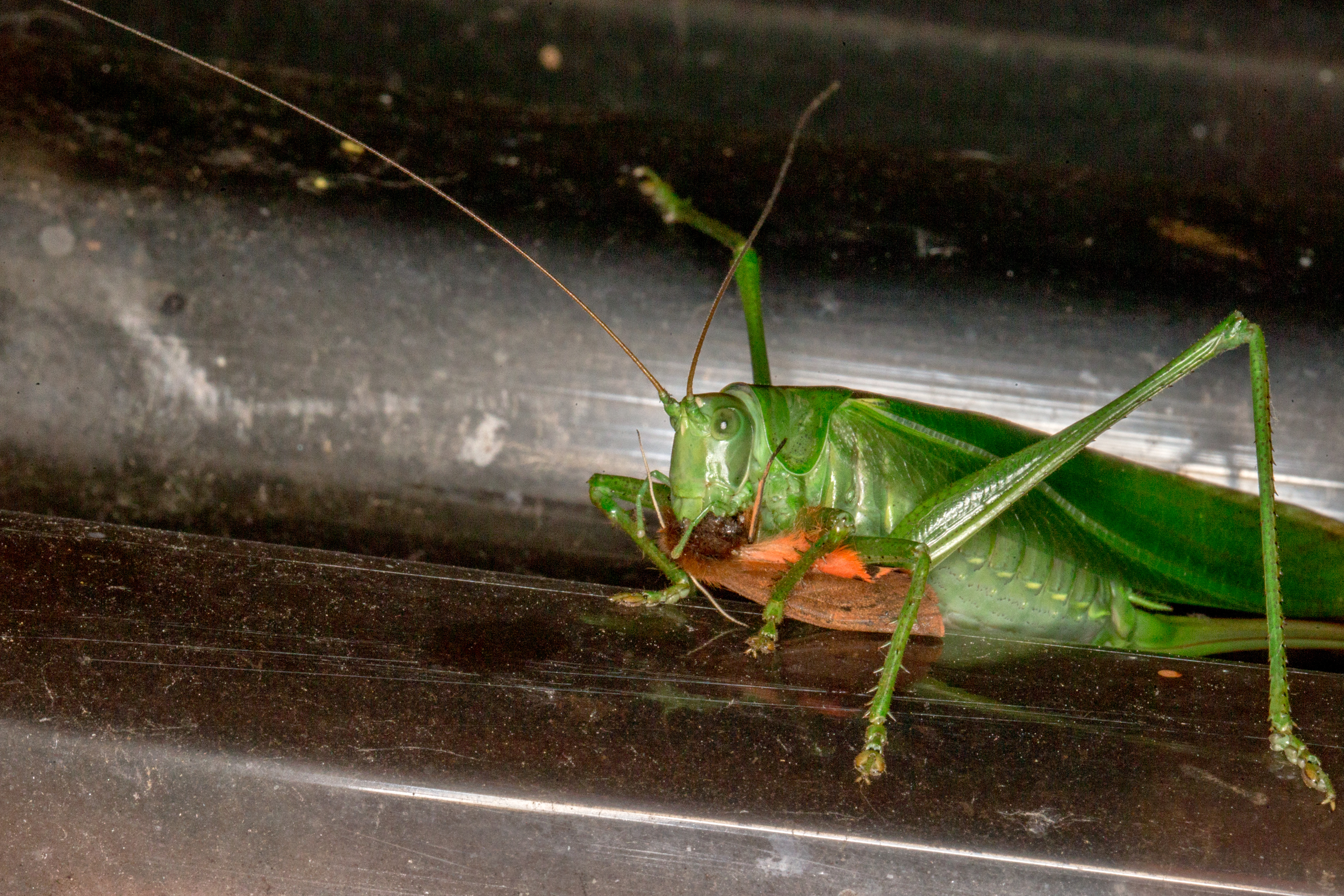
Tettigonia viridissima eating a moth
