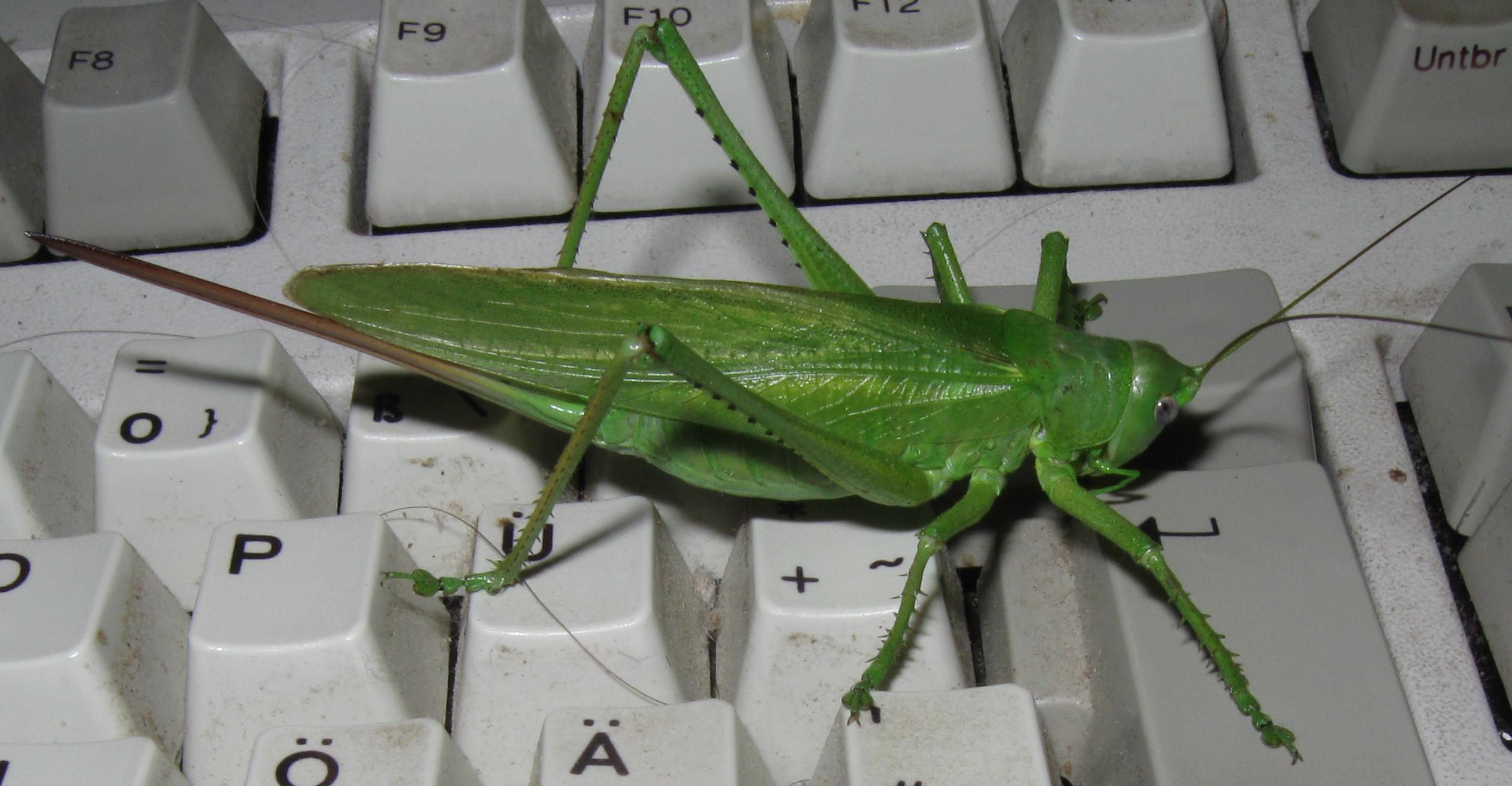
- Tettigonia caudata female

Scientific classification
- Kingdom: Animalia
- Phylum: Arthropoda
- Clade: Pancrustacea
- Class: Insecta
- Order: Orthoptera
- Suborder: Ensifera
- Family: Tettigoniidae
- Genus: Tettigonia
- Species: T. caudata

Binomial name
- Tettigonia caudata (Charpentier, 1842)

Audio
- Song

= Tettigonia caudata =

Species of cricket-like animal

Tettigonia caudata is a species of bush-crickets belonging to the family Tettigoniidae subfamily Tettigoniinae. It is found over most of Europe mainly in the East (it is absent from France and Spain). The males of this species prefer to inhabit tall and dense vegetation. This mesohabitat can be compared to that of T. viridissima, with which it competes.

Close-up of a Tettigonia caudata

== Reference information ==
Reference number one was provided by the journal Biologia which publishes research papers covering botany, zoology, and cellular biology.
