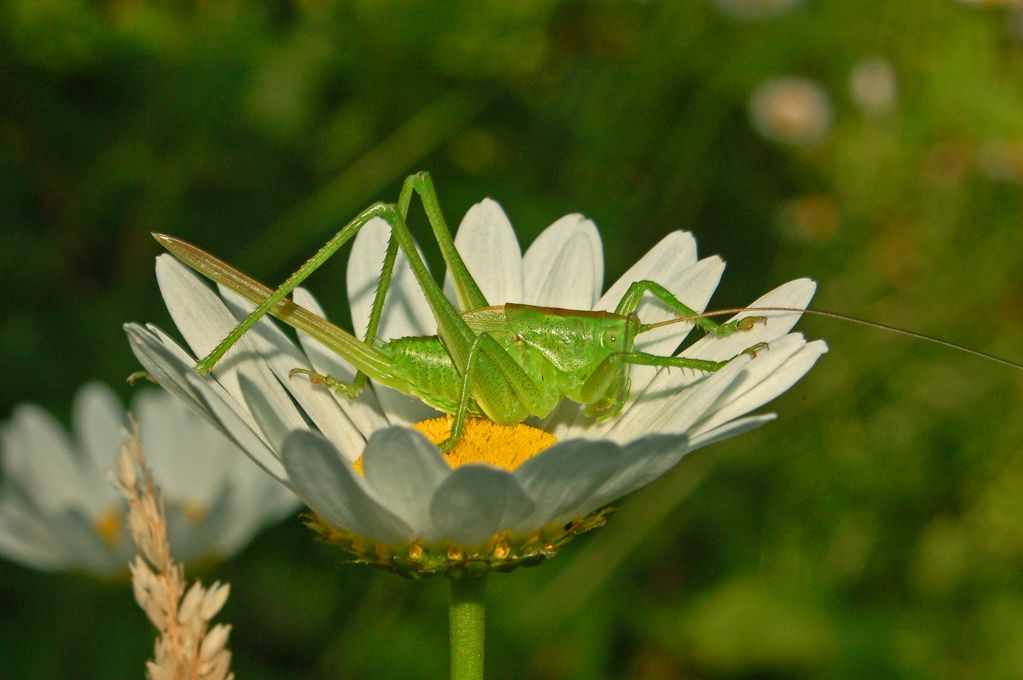
- Young female Tettigonia viridissima

Scientific classification
- Kingdom: Animalia
- Phylum: Arthropoda
- Class: Insecta
- Order: Orthoptera
- Suborder: Ensifera
- Family: Tettigoniidae
- Tribe: Tettigoniini
- Genus: Tettigonia; Linnaeus, 1758

Synonyms
- Eumenymus Pictet, 1888; Locusta Fabricius, 1775; Phasgonura Stephens, 1835

= Tettigonia =

Genus of katydids

Tettigonia is the type genus of bush crickets belonging to the subfamily Tettigoniinae. The scientific name Tettigonia is onomatopoeic and derives from the Greek τεττιξ, meaning cicada.

Species of this genus are typically quite large insects, with relatively massive bodies, green or brownish colour and long hindlegs. For example, great green bush-crickets, the type species described by Carl Linnaeus in his landmark 1758 10th edition of Systema Naturae, are the largest Orthopterans in the British Isles.

Most Tettigonia species are present in Europe, North Africa and the Asian mainland, apart from Tettigonia orientalis which occurs in Japan.

== Species ==
The Orthoptera Species File lists:

- Tettigonia armeniaca Tarbinsky, 1940 (synonyms T. acutipennis Ebner, 1946; T. turcica Ramme, 1951)
- Tettigonia balcanica Chobanov & Lemonnier-Darcemont, 2014
- Tettigonia cantans (Fuessly, 1775)
- Tettigonia caudata (Charpentier, 1842)
- Tettigonia chinensis Willemse, 1933
- Tettigonia chitralensis Sultana, Panhwar & Wagan, 2015
- Tettigonia dolichoptera Mori, 1933
- Tettigonia hispanica Bolívar, 1893
- Tettigonia ibuki Furukawa, 1938
- Tettigonia jungi Storozhenko, Kim & Jeon, 2015
- Tettigonia krugeri Massa, 1998
- Tettigonia longealata Chopard, 1937
- Tettigonia longispina Ingrisch, 1983
- Tettigonia lozanoi (Bolívar, 1914)
- Tettigonia macrocephalus (Fischer von Waldheim, 1846)
- Tettigonia macroxipha (Bolívar, 1914)
- Tettigonia orientalis Uvarov, 1924
- Tettigonia savignyi (Lucas, 1849)
- Tettigonia silana Capra, 1936
- Tettigonia tsushimensis Ogawa, 2003
- Tettigonia ussuriana Uvarov, 1939
- Tettigonia uvarovi Ebner, 1946
- Tettigonia vaucheriana (Pictet, 1888)
- Tettigonia viridissima (Linnaeus, 1758) - type species (as Gryllus viridissimus L.)
- Tettigonia yama Furukawa, 1938

== Gallery ==
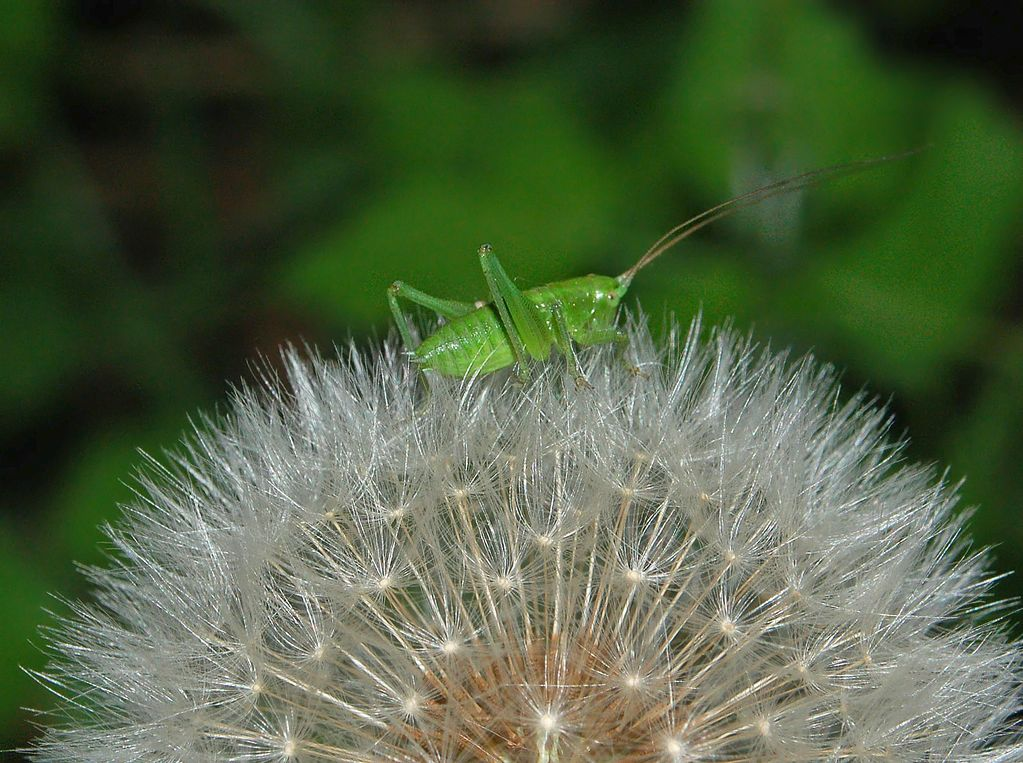
Nymph

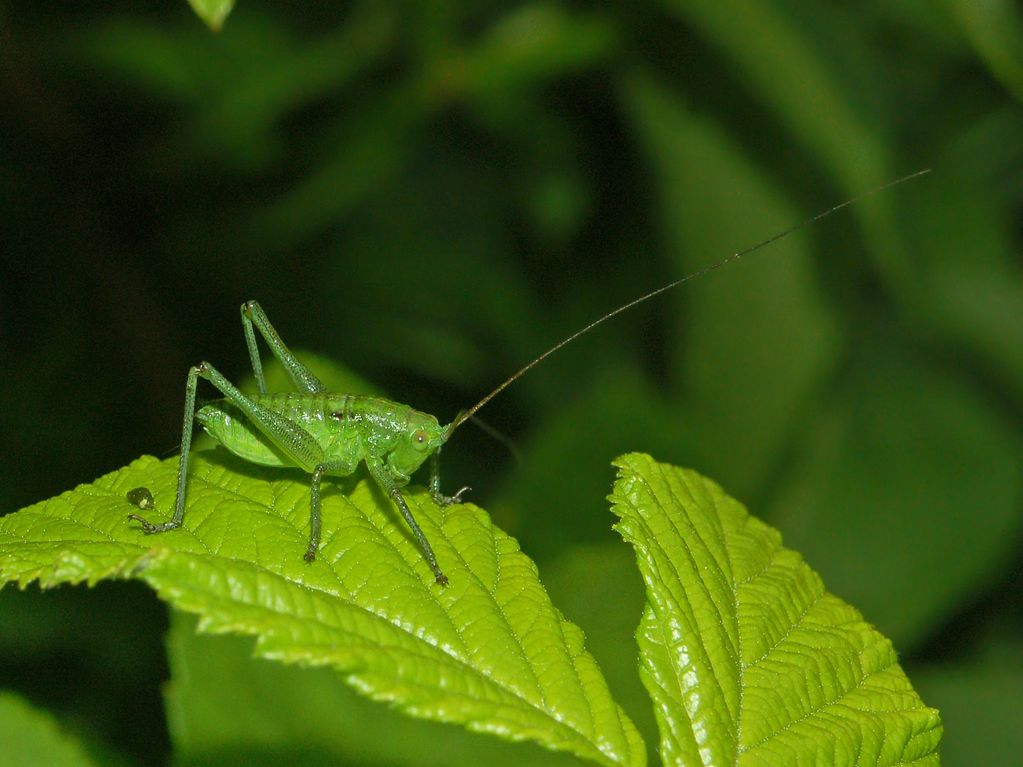
Nymph

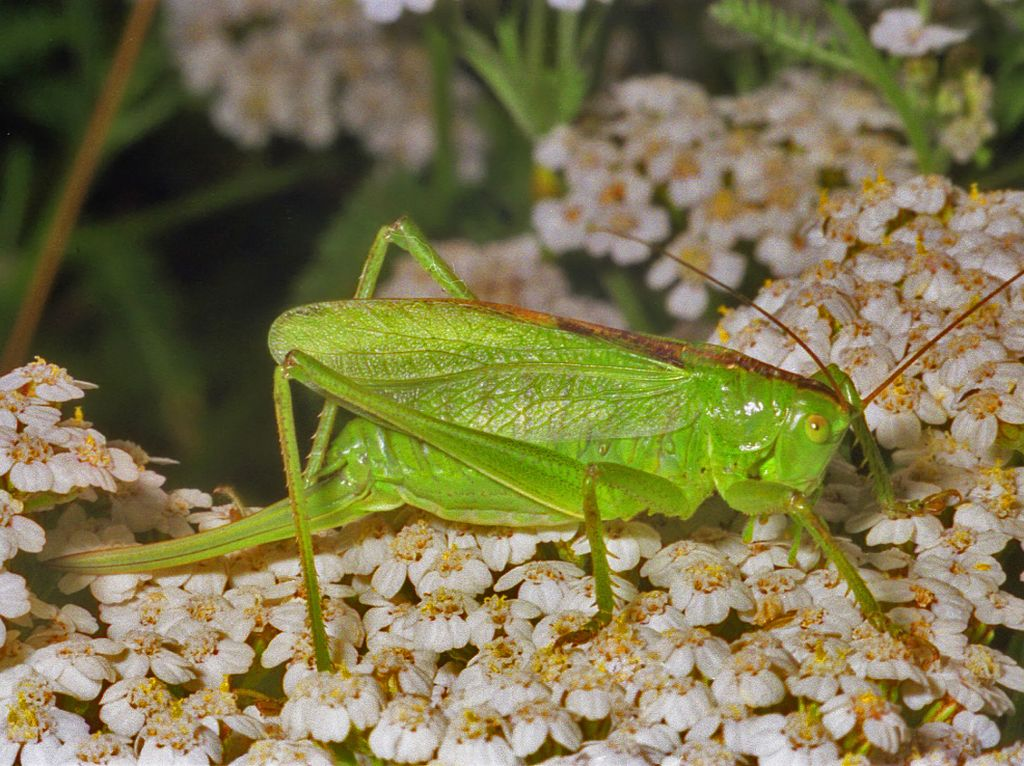
Female Tettigonia cantans

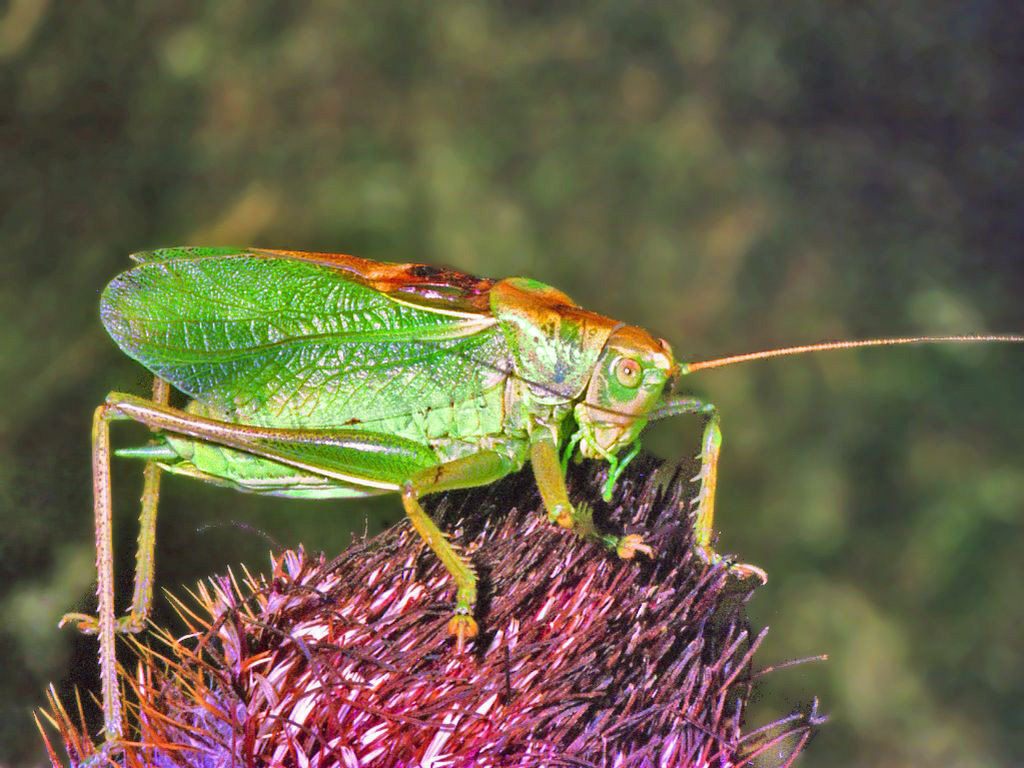
Male Tettigonia cantans

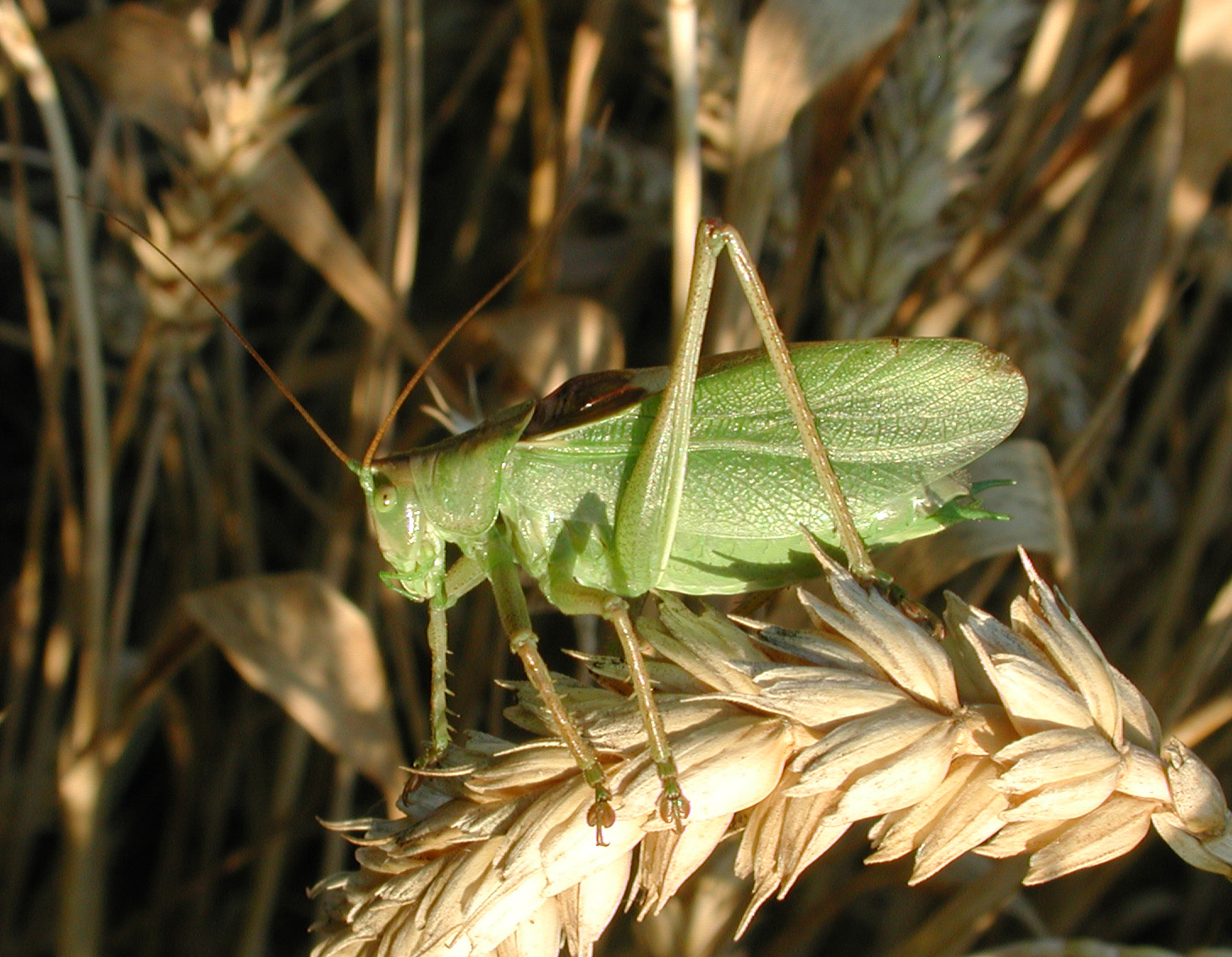
Tettigonia cantans

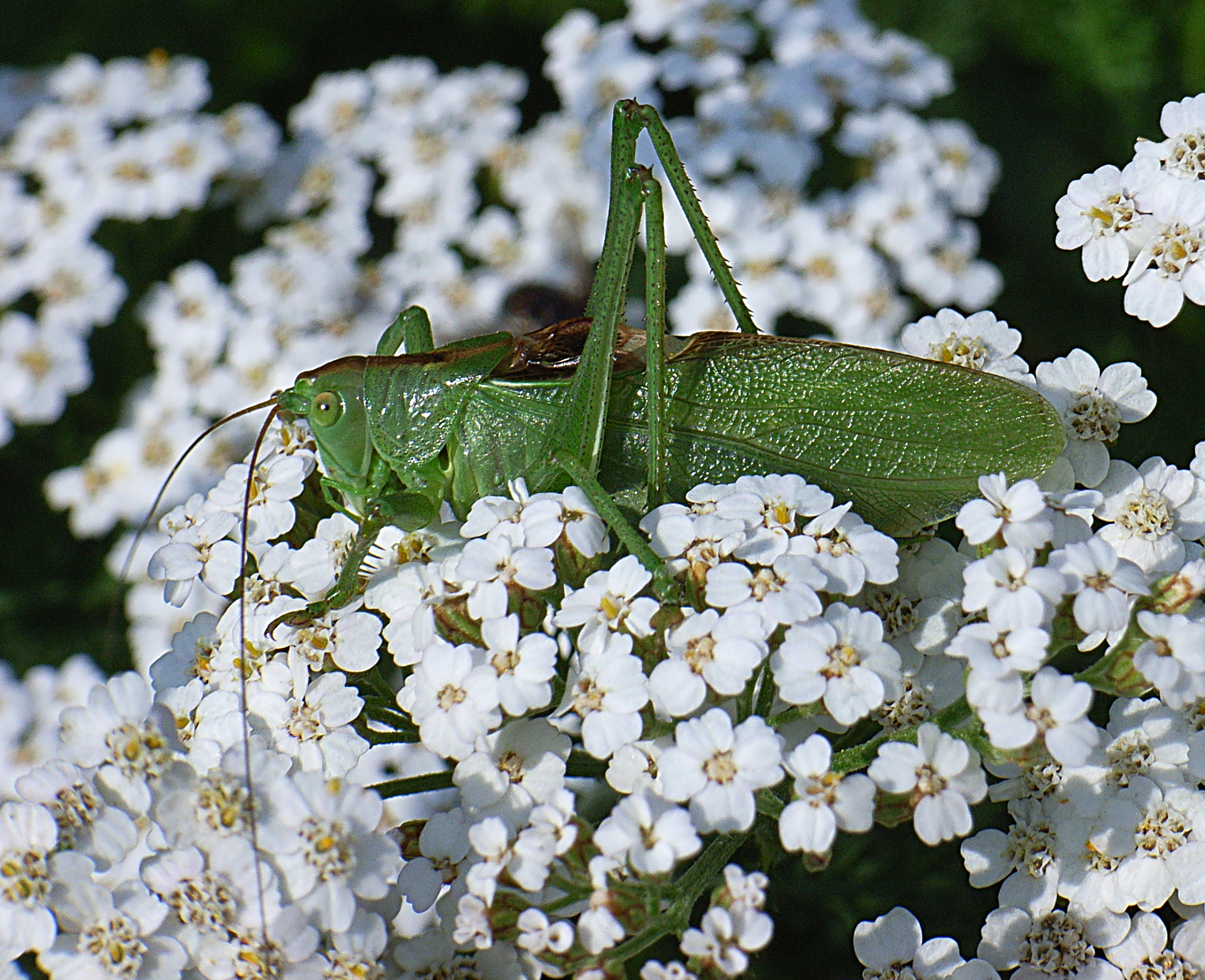
Tettigonia cantans

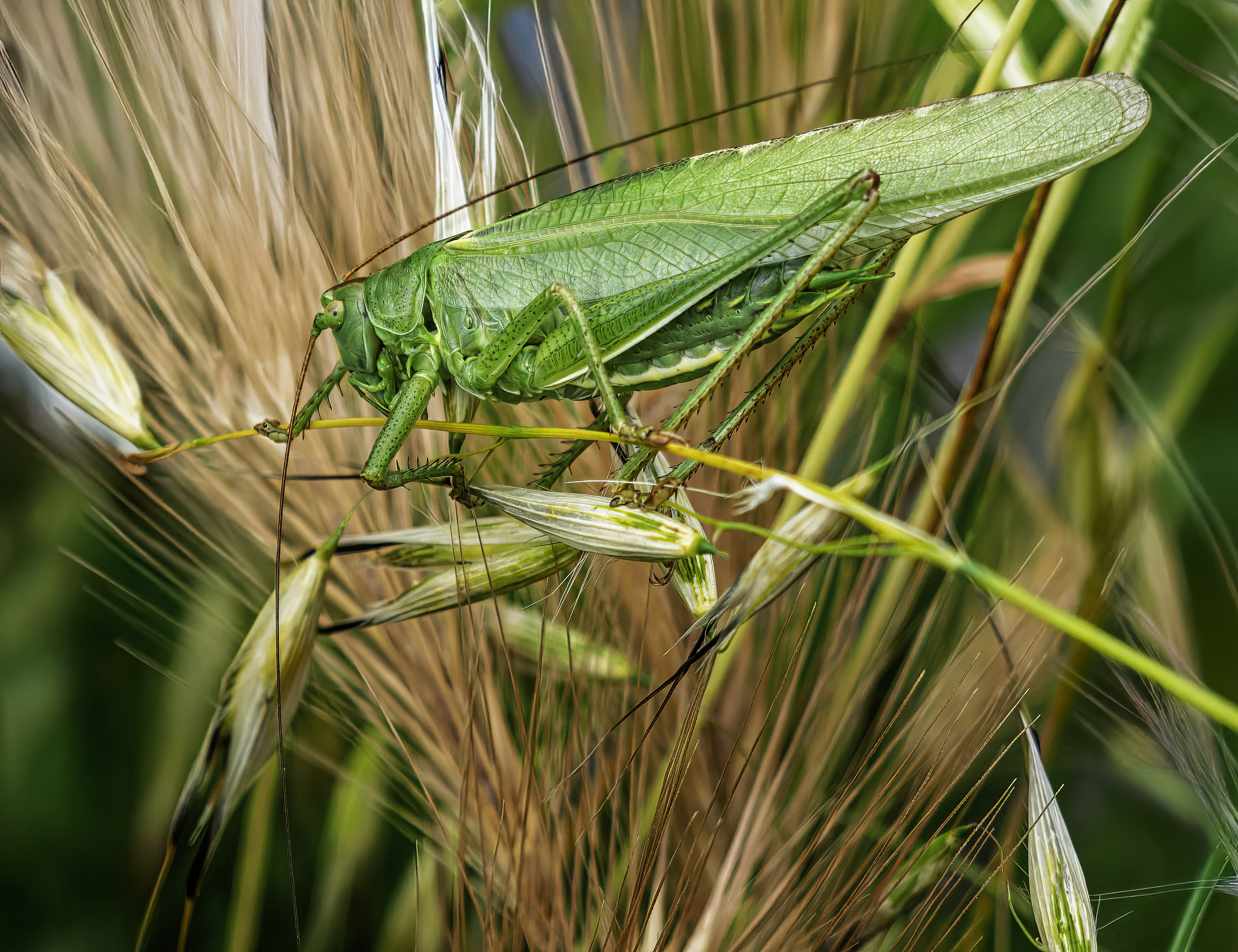
Male Tettigonia viridissima

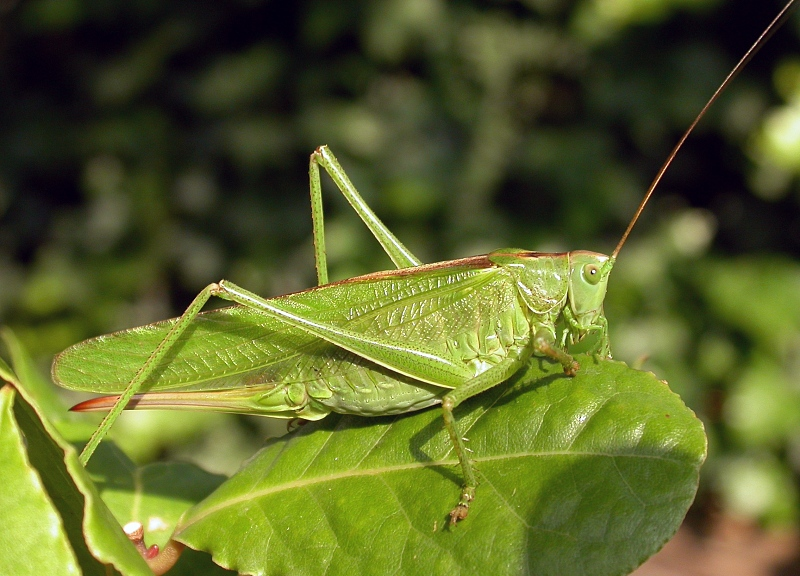
Female Tettigonia viridissima

== See also ==
- List of Orthopteroid genera containing species recorded in Europe
