= Tettigonia jungi =

Scientific classification
- Kingdom: Animalia
- Phylum: Arthropoda
- Clade: Pancrustacea
- Class: Insecta
- Order: Orthoptera
- Suborder: Ensifera
- Family: Tettigoniidae
- Genus: Tettigonia
- Species: T. jungi

Binomial name
- Tettigonia jungi Storozhenko, Kim & Jeon, 2015

Species of bush-crickets

Tettigonia jungi is a species of bush-crickets in the genus Tettigonia

== Distribution ==
The species can be found in Jeju Island and Yeoseodo, as well as an isolated population in the World Cup Park in Seoul, that was introduced through reeds from Jeju.
