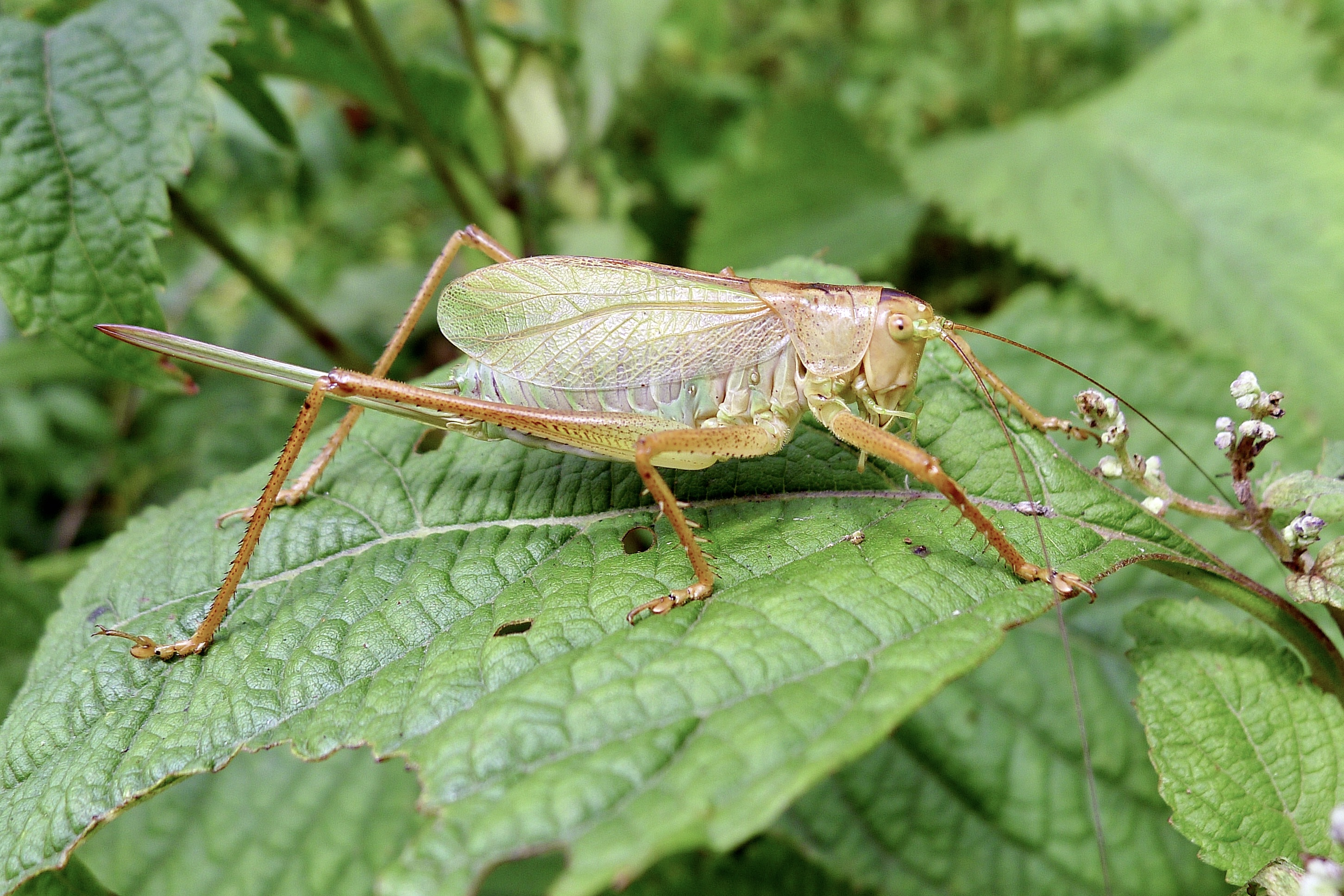
- A female Tettigonia ussuriana in Primorsky Krai, Russia

Scientific classification
- Kingdom: Animalia
- Phylum: Arthropoda
- Class: Insecta
- Order: Orthoptera
- Suborder: Ensifera
- Family: Tettigoniidae
- Genus: Tettigonia
- Species: T. ussuriana

Binomial name
- Tettigonia ussuriana Uvarov, 1939

= Tettigonia ussuriana =

Species of insect

Tettigonia ussuriana is a species of bush-cricket in the genus Tettigonia and family katydids.

It was first described by Russian entomologist, Boris Uvarov in 1939.

== Distribution ==
Tettigonia ussuriana is indigenous to southeastern Russia, northeastern China and the Korean peninsula.
