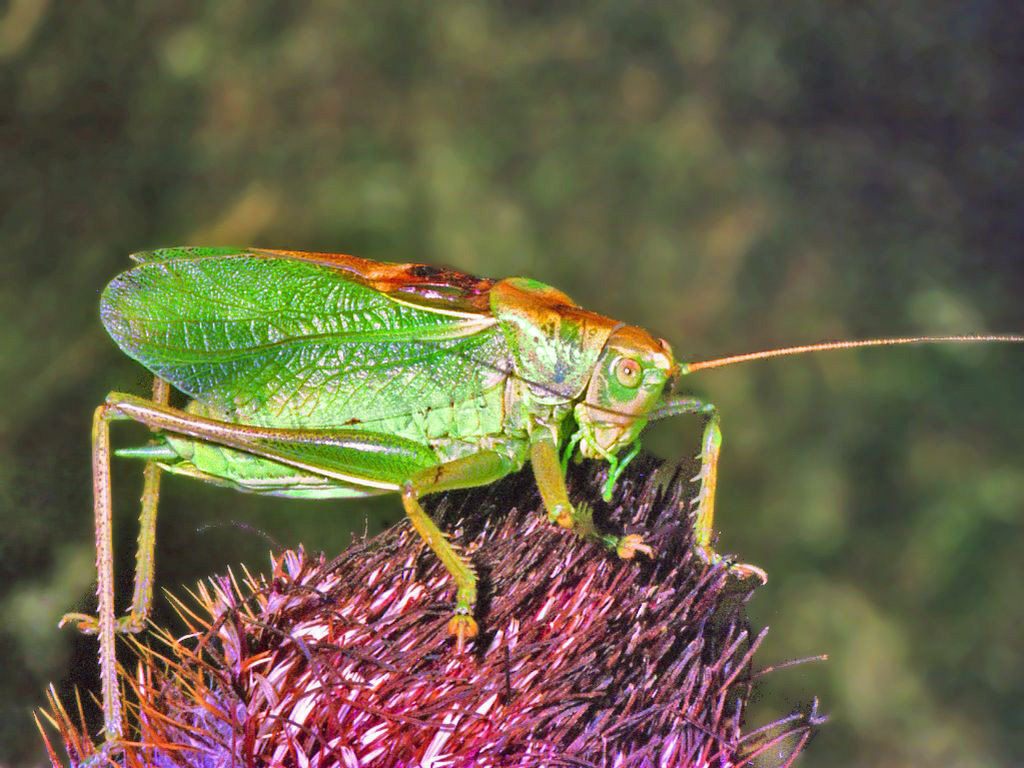
- Tettigonia cantans, male
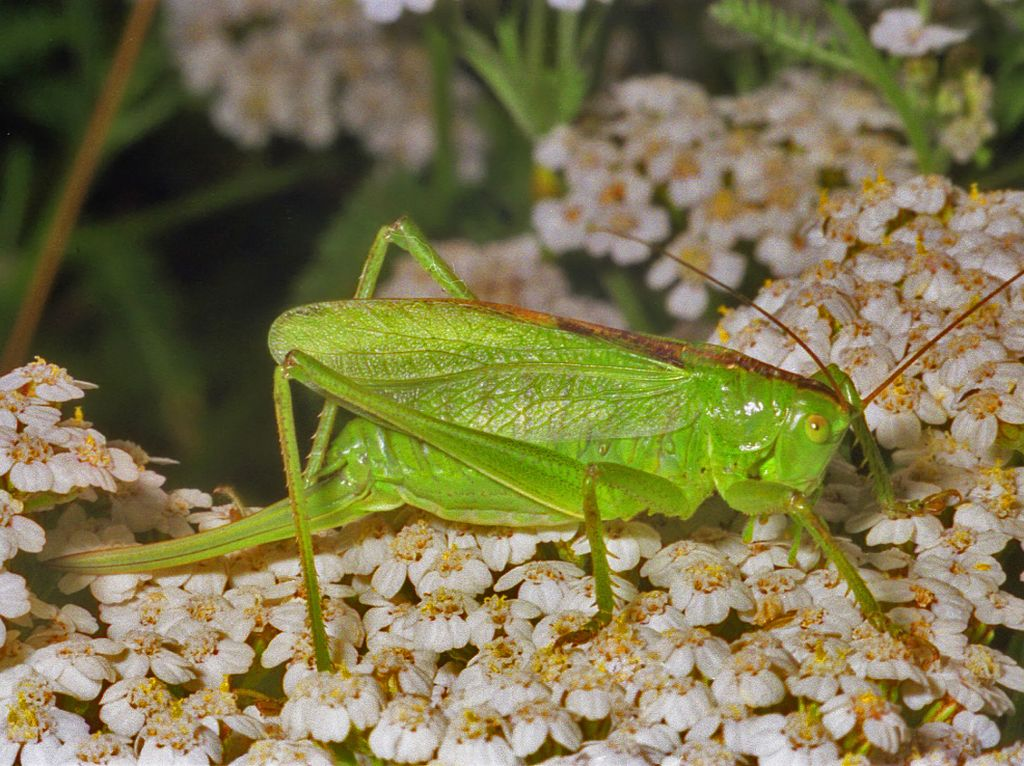
- Female

Scientific classification
- Kingdom: Animalia
- Phylum: Arthropoda
- Class: Insecta
- Order: Orthoptera
- Suborder: Ensifera
- Family: Tettigoniidae
- Genus: Tettigonia
- Species: T. cantans

Binomial name
- Tettigonia cantans (Fuessly, 1775)

Synonyms
- Gryllus cantans Fuessly, 1775; Locusta cantans; Tettigonia gaverniensis Serville, 1838

= Tettigonia cantans =

Species of cricket-like animal

Tettigonia cantans is a species of bush crickets (or katydids) belonging to the family Tettigoniidae subfamily Tettigoniinae.

== Distribution ==
Tettigonia cantans is present in most of Europe, in the eastern Palearctic realm, in Near East, and in North Africa. The distribution extends from the Pyrenees to China. In the Mediterranean region, Tettigonia cantans is restricted to the higher elevations of the mountains. It is absent from most parts of Western Europe (Great Britain, western France, most of Iberian Peninsula).

== Habitat ==
Tettigonia cantans inhabits moist to moderately dry and rather cool habitats such as fens, marshes, tall herb vegetation, mountain meadows, clearcuts and woodland edges. But it is observed even in potato fields and on mountainous nutrient-poor, dry limestone grasslands with higher growing vegetation.

== Description ==
The adult males grow up to 20–30 millimetres (0.79–1.18 in) long, while females reach 29–35 millimetres (1.1–1.4 in). The basic coloration of the body is usually green, with a brown stripe on the back. These grasshoppers hardly fly, their wings are shorter and wider than in the other Tettigonia species, only slightly covering the end of the abdomen. The ovipositor of the female extends beyond the tip of the wings.

== Biology ==
Adults can be found from mid June through October. The eggs overwinter in the soil, according to literature, at least twice. They mainly feed on other insects, but also on vegetable foods. They are active from noon until night and males are detectable by their characteristic and pleasant singing (hence the Latin name cantans). The females lay eggs in moist soil. Tettigonia cantans is not endangered.

== Diet ==
This species eats plants and other insects

Sound of Tettigonia cantans
Field recording in the Netherlands 35s

== Gallery ==
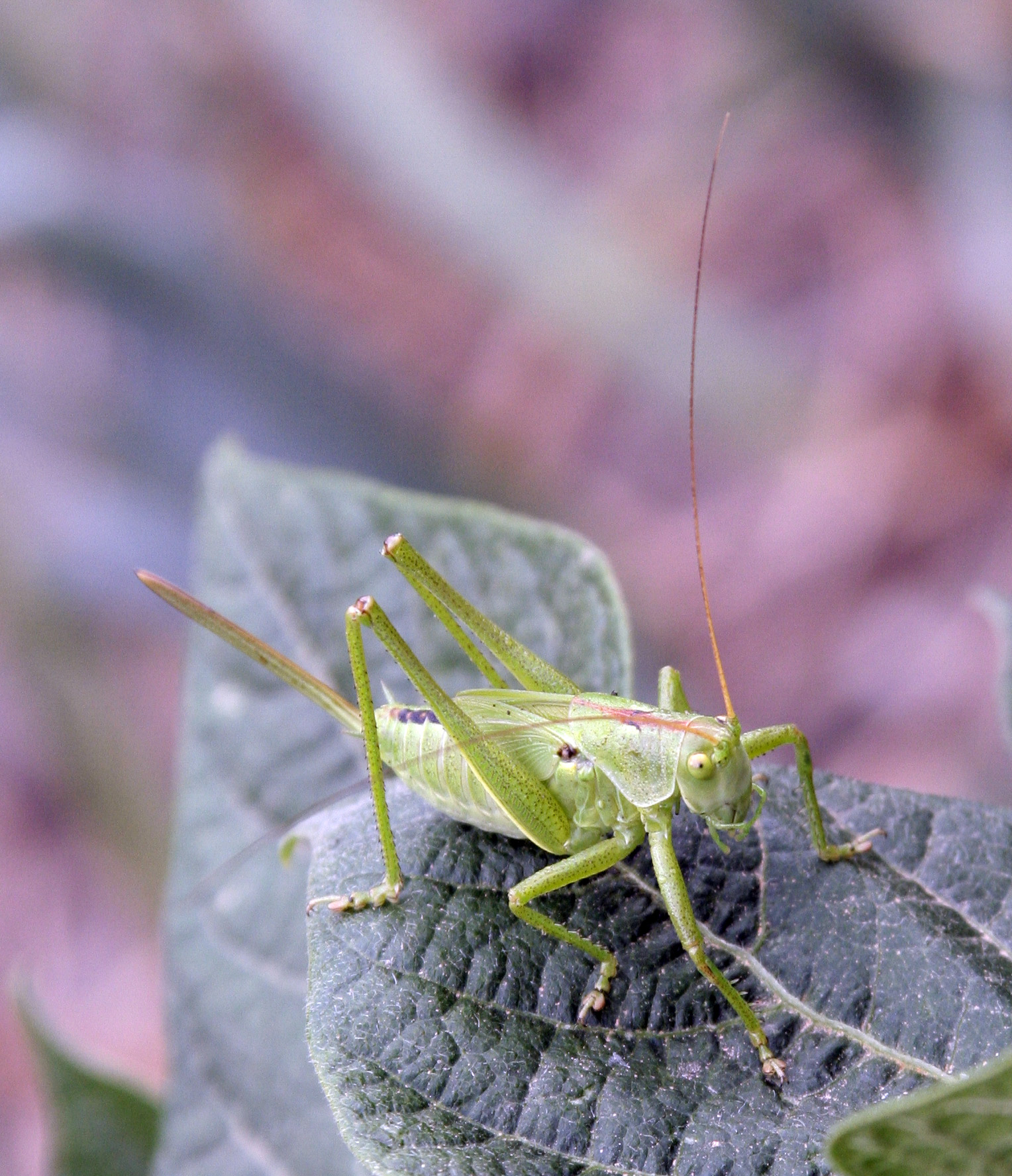
Tettigonia cantans, female

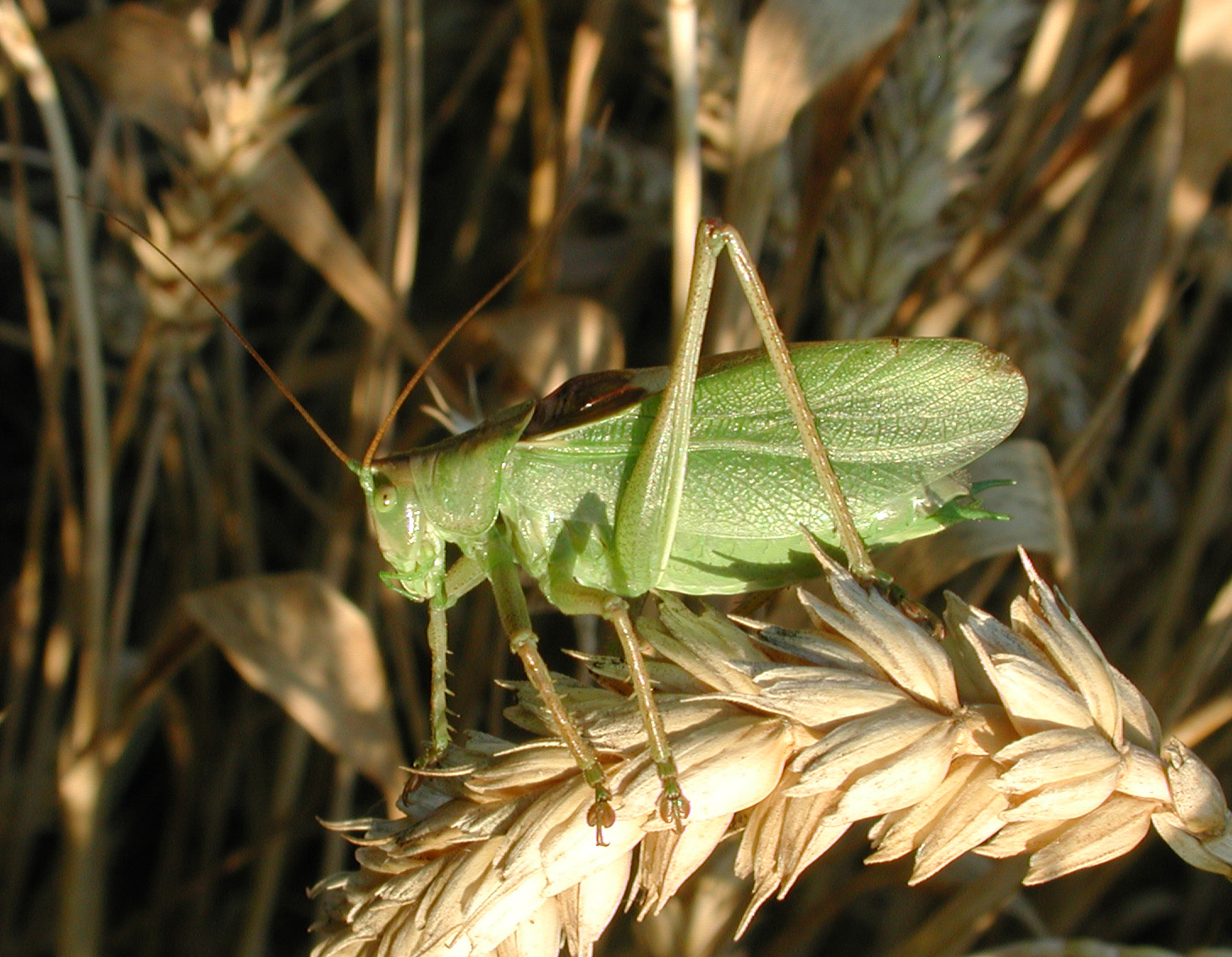
Tettigonia cantans, male

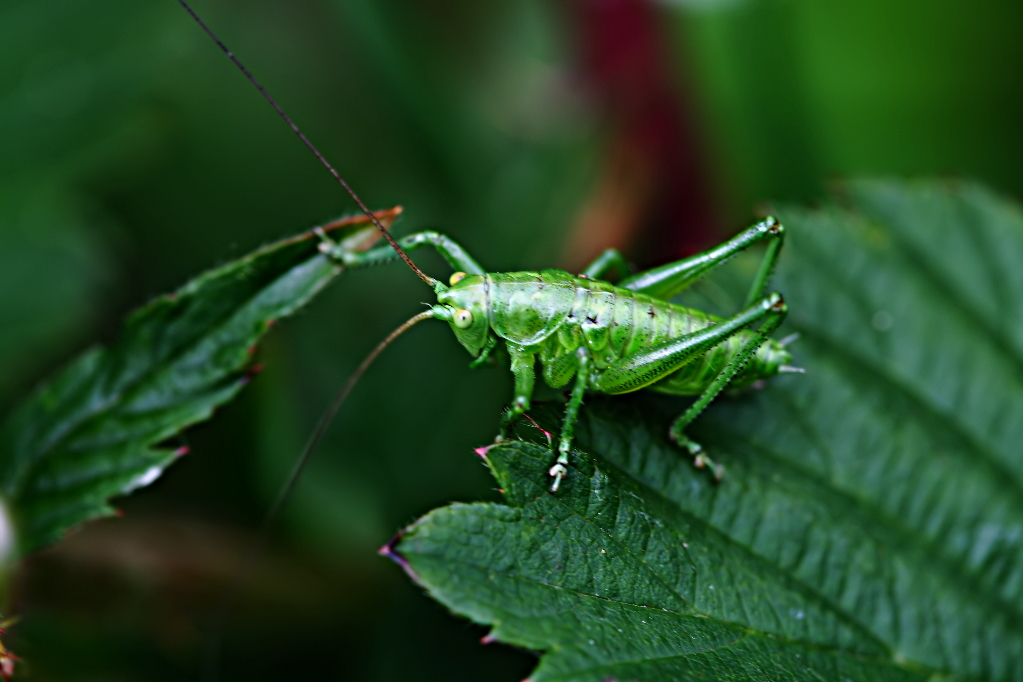
Tettigonia cantans, male nymph

Stridulation

Close-Up of a Tettigonia cantans
