= Clonia =

Clonia may refer to:

- Clonia (bush cricket), a genus of predatory katydids in the subfamily Saginae
- Clonia (Hemiclonia), a subgenus of predatory katydids in the subfamily Saginae
- Clonia (nymph), a nymph in Greek mythology, consort of Hyrieus
