= Clonia melanoptera =

Scientific classification
- Kingdom: Animalia
- Phylum: Arthropoda
- Class: Insecta
- Order: Orthoptera
- Suborder: Ensifera
- Family: Tettigoniidae
- Genus: Clonia
- Subgenus: Hemiclonia
- Species: C. melanoptera

Binomial name
- Clonia melanoptera (Linnaeus, 1758)

Synonyms
- Clonia elegans (Blanchard, C.E., 1840); Conocephalus spinigerus Thunberg, 1815; Gryllus azurea Stoll, C., 1813; Gryllus melanopterus Linnaeus, 1758; Saga elegans Blanchard, E. 1840

Species of cricket-like animal

Clonia (Hemiclonia) melanoptera, the giant black-winged clonia, is a species of predatory bush crickets in the subfamily Saginae. It is found in South Africa.

== See also ==
- Coleoptera in the 10th edition of Systema Naturae
- List of least concern insects
