= Clonia (Hemiclonia) =

Scientific classification
- Domain: Eukaryota
- Kingdom: Animalia
- Phylum: Arthropoda
- Class: Insecta
- Order: Orthoptera
- Suborder: Ensifera
- Family: Tettigoniidae
- Genus: Clonia
- Subgenus: Hemiclonia (Kirby, 1906)

Species
- Clonia assimilis; Clonia charpentieri; Clonia ignota; Clonia lalandei; Clonia melanoptera

Subgenus of cricket-like animals

Clonia (Hemiclonia) is a subgenus of predatory katydids in the subfamily Saginae.
