= Cloniella =

Scientific classification
- Domain: Eukaryota
- Kingdom: Animalia
- Phylum: Arthropoda
- Class: Insecta
- Order: Orthoptera
- Suborder: Ensifera
- Family: Tettigoniidae
- Subfamily: Saginae
- Genus: Cloniella; Kaltenbach, 1971

Type species
- Cloniella praedatoria Distant, 1892

Genus of insects

Cloniella is a genus of bush crickets in the subfamily Saginae with species found in Africa.

== Species ==
The following species are recognised in the genus Cloniella:

- Cloniella praedatoria (Distant, 1892) - type species (as Hemisaga praedatoria Distant)
- Cloniella zambesica Kaltenbach, 1971
