= Psacadonotus seriatus =

Conservation status
- Vulnerable (IUCN 2.3)

Scientific classification
- Kingdom: Animalia
- Phylum: Arthropoda
- Class: Insecta
- Order: Orthoptera
- Suborder: Ensifera
- Family: Tettigoniidae
- Genus: Psacadonotus
- Species: P. seriatus

Binomial name
- Psacadonotus seriatus Redtenbacher, 1891

Species of cricket-like animal

Psacadonotus seriatus is a species of insect in the family Tettigoniidae. It is endemic to Australia.
