= Austrosaga =

Conservation status
- Vulnerable (IUCN 2.3)

Scientific classification
- Kingdom: Animalia
- Phylum: Arthropoda
- Class: Insecta
- Order: Orthoptera
- Suborder: Ensifera
- Family: Tettigoniidae
- Subfamily: Austrosaginae
- Genus: Austrosaga; Rentz, 1993
- Species: A. spinifer

Binomial name
- Austrosaga spinifer Rentz, 1993

Genus of cricket-like animals

Austrosaga is a genus of insect in the family Tettigoniidae. The only species is Austrosaga spinifer. It is endemic to Australia.
