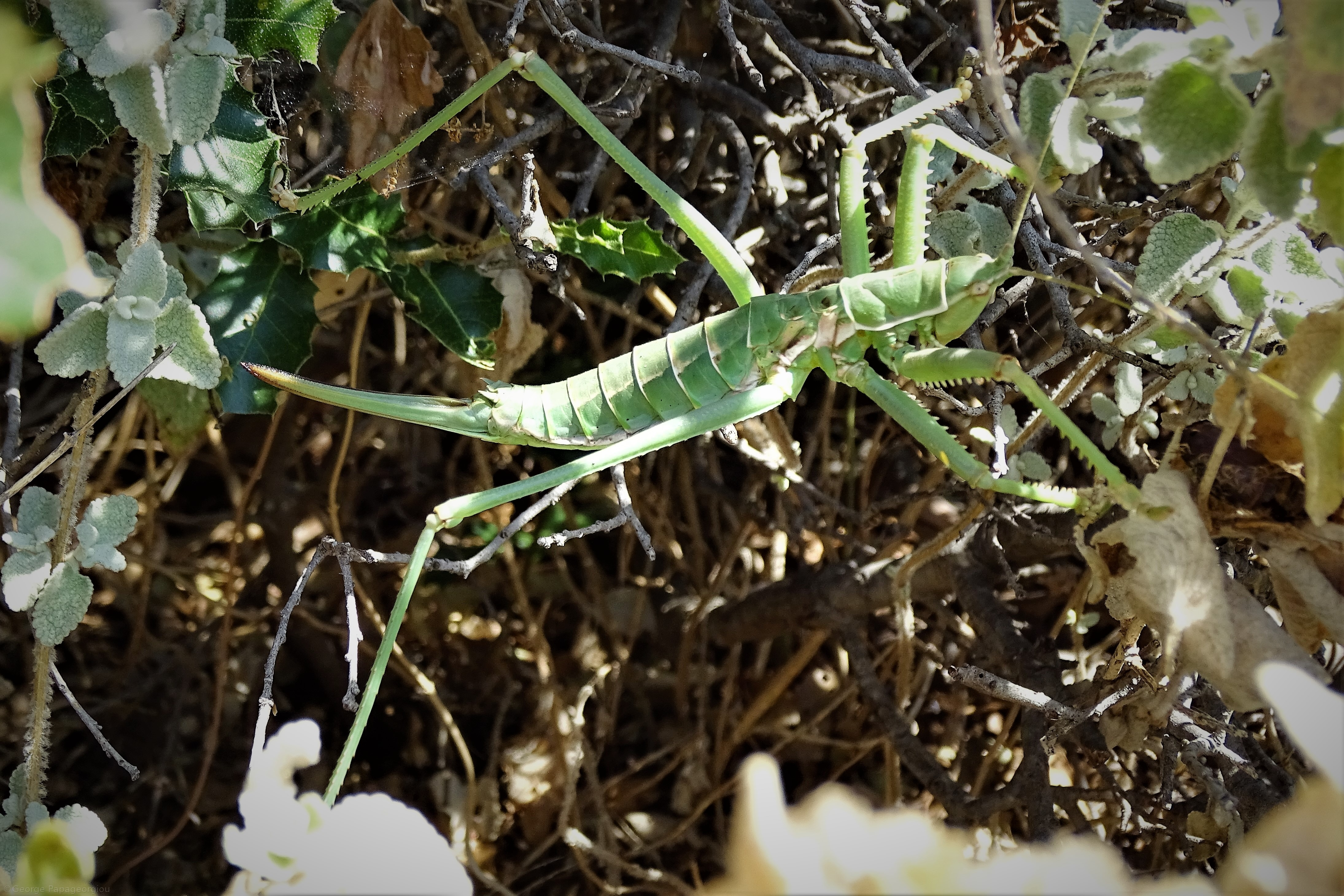
- In central Greece

Scientific classification
- Domain: Eukaryota
- Kingdom: Animalia
- Phylum: Arthropoda
- Class: Insecta
- Order: Orthoptera
- Suborder: Ensifera
- Family: Tettigoniidae
- Genus: Saga
- Species: S. hellenica

Binomial name
- Saga hellenica Kaltenbach, 1967

= Saga hellenica =

Species of cricket

Saga hellenica is a large species of bush cricket or katydid in the family Tettigoniidae. It is endemic to the Balkans, living in Albania, North Macedonia, Greece (without Eastern Macedonia and Thrace) and in the past also in western Bulgaria, where it occurred on shrubs and more rarely in the grass in open stony terrains and light xerophytic forests.

It feeds on other large insects such as other species of Orthoptera including crickets and grasshoppers. Although it is locally common in most of its geographical range, it is threatened by agricultural activities and seasonal fires created by farmers and arsonists.
