= Psacadonotus insulanus =

Conservation status
- Endangered (IUCN 2.3)

Scientific classification
- Kingdom: Animalia
- Phylum: Arthropoda
- Class: Insecta
- Order: Orthoptera
- Suborder: Ensifera
- Family: Tettigoniidae
- Genus: Psacadonotus
- Species: P. insulanus

Binomial name
- Psacadonotus insulanus Rentz, 1993

Species of insect

Psacadonotus insulanus is a species of insect in the family Tettigoniidae. It is endemic to Australia. The insects are known to frequently inhabit Nuytsia farms in Western Australia.
