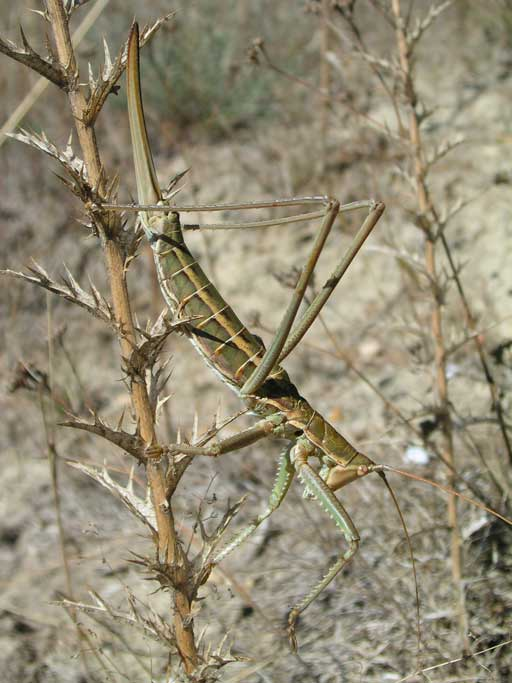
- Mature Saga pedo

Scientific classification
- Kingdom: Animalia
- Phylum: Arthropoda
- Clade: Pancrustacea
- Class: Insecta
- Order: Orthoptera
- Suborder: Ensifera
- Family: Tettigoniidae
- Subfamily: Saginae; Brunner von Wattenwyl, 1878

= Saginae =

Predatory katydids

Subfamily of cricket-like animals

The Saginae, commonly known as the predatory katydids or predatory bush-crickets, is a subfamily of the family Tettigoniidae (the bush-crickets or katydids). They are mostly found in Europe, west and central Asia and southern Africa.

The Saginae are specialist carnivores, which is unusual among the Orthoptera. Their specialist carnivory and appropriately adapted digestive tracts even were regarded as unique in the order Orthoptera, but at least some members of two other subfamilies, the Austrosaginae and Listroscelidinae are partly or completely predatory as well, and until recently those subfamilies were included in the Saginae.

== Genera and selected species ==
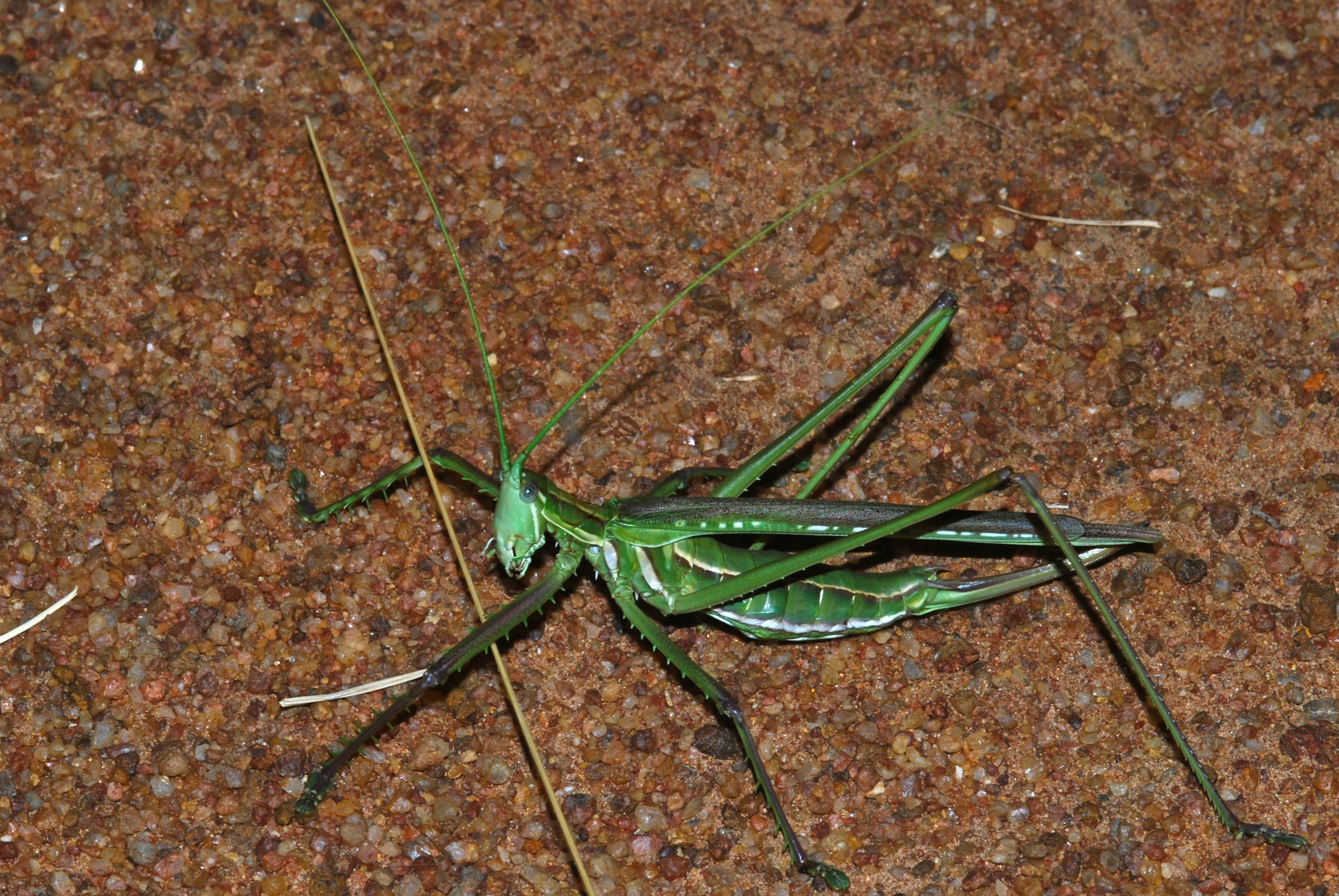
Clonia wahlbergi

- Clonia Stål, 1855
  - Clonia wahlbergi Stål, 1855
- Cloniella Kaltenbach, 1971
  - Cloniella praedatoria (Distant, 1892)
  - Cloniella zambesica Kaltenbach, 1971
- Emptera Saussure, 1888
  - Emptera indica (Herbst, 1786)
- Peringueyella Saussure, 1888
  - Peringueyella jocosa Saussure, 1888
  - Peringueyella macrocephala (Schaum, 1853)
  - Peringueyella rentzi Kaltenbach, 1981
  - Peringueyella zulu Kaltenbach, 1971
- Saga Charpentier, 1825
  - Saga pedo (Pallas, 1771)

== Description ==
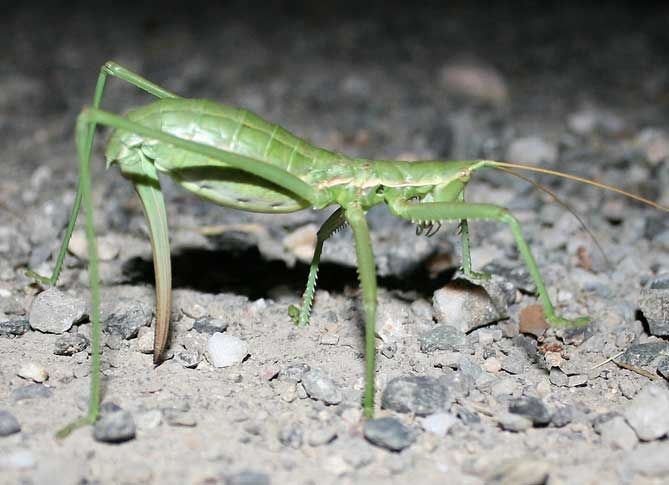
Saga pedo about to oviposit an egg in soil

Sagines are gracile and elongated in build compared to locusts or crickets, but their four anterior walking legs, as opposed to their two posterior leaping legs, are powerful and lined with spines, mainly along their inner edges. They use those inner spines in clasping their prey. Some species have spines on the outer surfaces and on the leaping legs as well; those external spines are believed to be defensive in function. The jaws of sagines are large, powerful, and sharp, with the insects often resorting to biting when handled.

Sagines are large insects, with some species having a body length of more than 50 mm, not counting the antennae or ovipositor, which are long, typically about as long as the body. The ovipositor is long and sword-like, and used for oviposition in soil.
