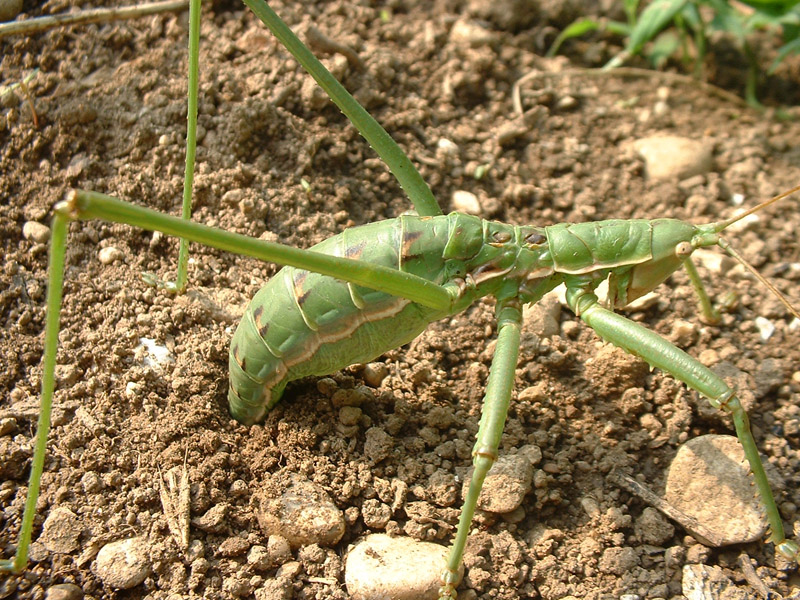
- Saga pedo laying eggs in soil

Scientific classification
- Domain: Eukaryota
- Kingdom: Animalia
- Phylum: Arthropoda
- Class: Insecta
- Order: Orthoptera
- Suborder: Ensifera
- Family: Tettigoniidae
- Subfamily: Saginae
- Tribe: Sagini; Brunner von Wattenwyl, 1878
- Genus: Saga; Charpentier, 1825

Type species
- Saga pedo (as Locusta serrata) Fabricius, 1793

Synonyms
- Tettigopsis Fischer von Waldheim, 1830

= Saga (bush cricket) =

Genus of cricket-like animals

Saga is a genus of bush crickets or katydids in the subfamily Saginae, originally described by Toussaint de Charpentier in 1825. It is the only genus in the tribe Sagini; species have been recorded from southern Europe and western and central Asia.

== Species ==
The Orthoptera species file lists:

1. Saga beieri Kaltenbach, 1967
2. Saga campbelli Uvarov, 1921
3. Saga cappadocica Werner, 1903
4. Saga ephippigera Fischer von Waldheim, 1846
5. Saga gracilis Kis, 1962
6. Saga hakkarica Sirin & Taylan, 2019
7. Saga hellenica Kaltenbach, 1967
8. Saga ledereri Saussure, 1888
9. Saga longicaudata Krauss, 1879
10. Saga natoliae Serville, 1838
11. Saga ornata Burmeister, 1838
12. Saga pedo (Pallas, 1771)
13. Saga puella Werner, 1901
14. Saga quadrisignata Philippi, 1863
15. Saga rammei Kaltenbach, 1965
16. Saga rhodiensis Salfi, 1929
17. Saga syriaca Lucas, 1864
