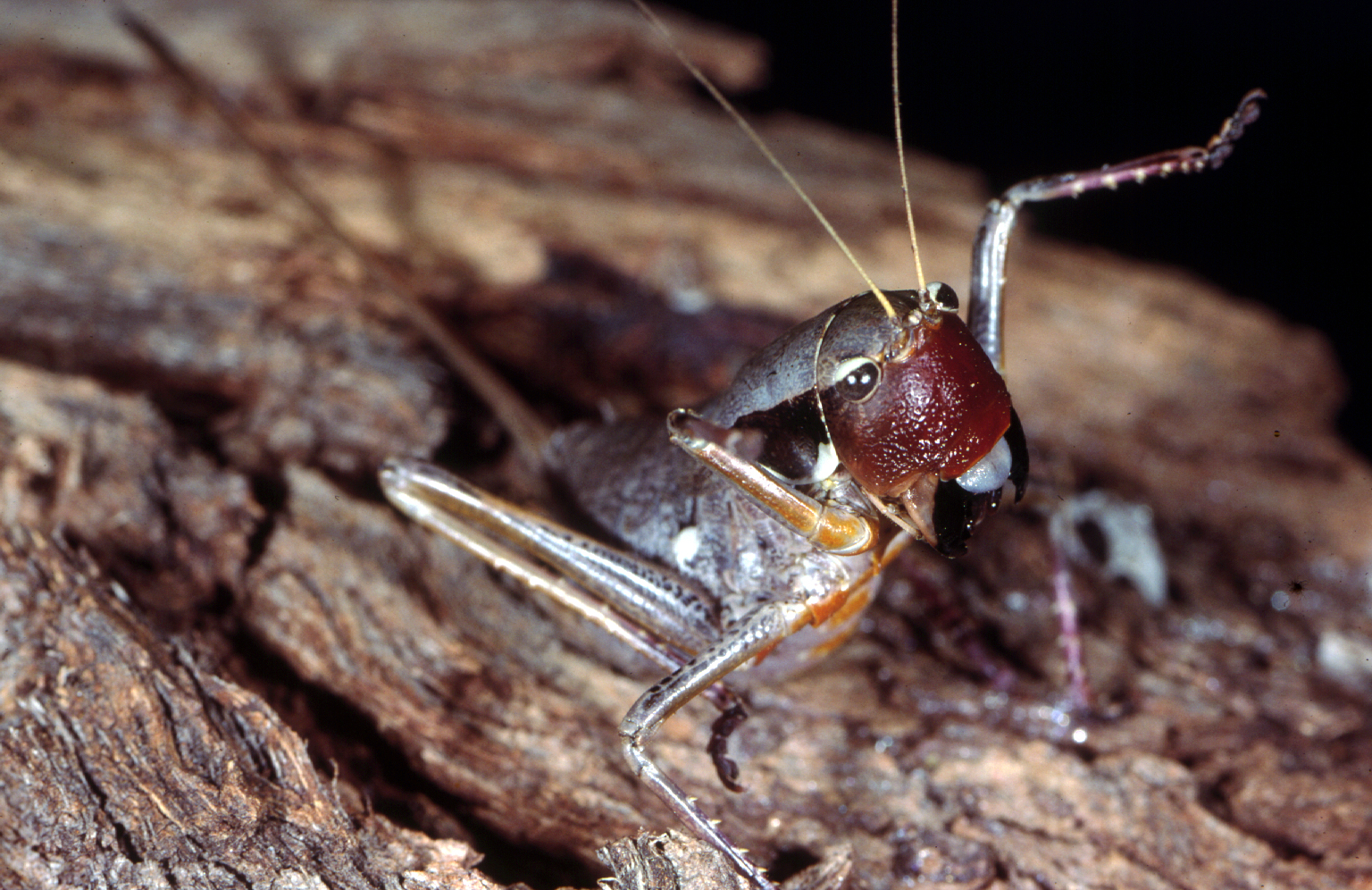

Scientific classification
- Domain: Eukaryota
- Kingdom: Animalia
- Phylum: Arthropoda
- Class: Insecta
- Order: Orthoptera
- Suborder: Ensifera
- Family: Tettigoniidae
- Subfamily: Austrosaginae
- Genus: Pachysaga; Brunner von Wattenwyl, 1893

= Pachysaga =

Genus of cricket-like animals

Pachysaga is a genus of insect in the family Tettigoniidae.

== Species ==
The following species are recognised in the genus Pachysaga:

- Pachysaga australis (Walker, 1869)
- Pachysaga croceopteryx Rentz, 1993
- Pachysaga eneabba Rentz, 1993
- Pachysaga munggai Rentz, 1993
- Pachysaga ocrocercus Rentz, 1993
- Pachysaga strobila Rentz, 1993
