= Psacadonotus =

Scientific classification
- Domain: Eukaryota
- Kingdom: Animalia
- Phylum: Arthropoda
- Class: Insecta
- Order: Orthoptera
- Suborder: Ensifera
- Family: Tettigoniidae
- Subfamily: Austrosaginae
- Genus: Psacadonotus; Redtenbacher, 1891

Genus of cricket-like animals

Psacadonotus is a genus of insects in the family Tettigoniidae.

== Species ==
The following species are recognised in the genus Psacadonotus:

- Psacadonotus diurnus Rentz, 1993
- Psacadonotus insulanus Rentz, 1993
- Psacadonotus kenkulun Rentz, 1993
- Psacadonotus psithyros Rentz, 1993
- Psacadonotus robustus Rentz, 1993
- Psacadonotus seriatus Redtenbacher, 1891
- Psacadonotus serratimerus Rentz, 1993
- Psacadonotus viridis Rentz, 1993
