= Peringueyella =

Scientific classification
- Kingdom: Animalia
- Phylum: Arthropoda
- Class: Insecta
- Order: Orthoptera
- Suborder: Ensifera
- Family: Tettigoniidae
- Subfamily: Saginae
- Genus: Peringueyella; Saussure, 1888

Type species
- Peringueyella jocosa Saussure, 1888

Genus of cricket-like animals

Peringueyella is a genus of African predatory bush crickets in the subfamily Saginae.

== Species ==
The following species are recognised in the genus Peringueyella:

- Peringueyella jocosa Saussure, 1888
- Peringueyella macrocephala (Schaum, 1853)
- Peringueyella rentzi Kaltenbach, 1981
- Peringueyella zulu Kaltenbach, 1971
