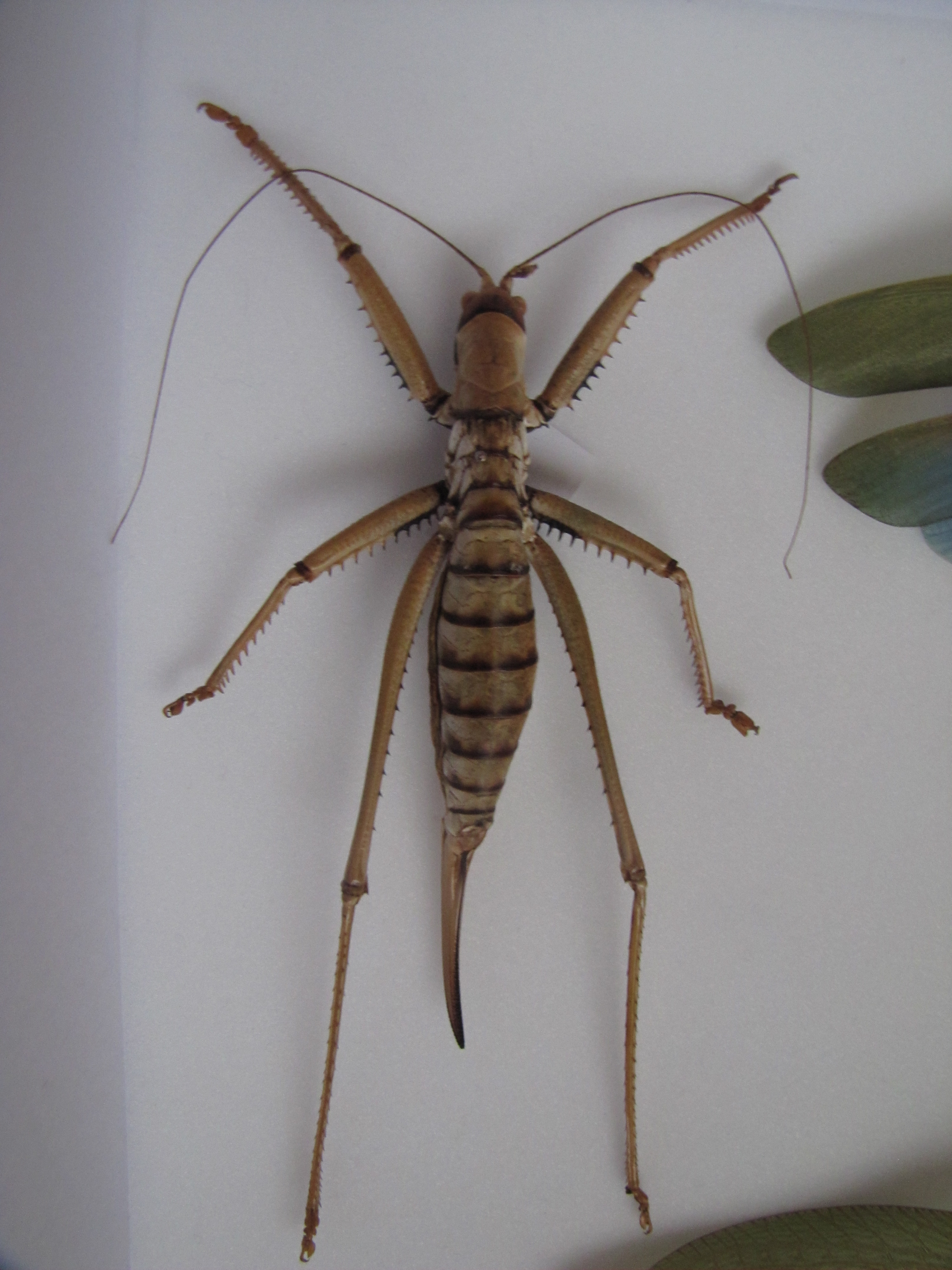

Conservation status
- Least Concern (IUCN 3.1)

Scientific classification
- Kingdom: Animalia
- Phylum: Arthropoda
- Class: Insecta
- Order: Orthoptera
- Suborder: Ensifera
- Family: Tettigoniidae
- Genus: Saga
- Species: S. natoliae

Binomial name
- Saga natoliae Serville, 1838

= Saga natoliae =

Species of insect

Saga natoliae, also known as the Anatolian predatory bush cricket, is a species of bush cricket found on Balkan Peninsula and in Anatolia.

== Distribution ==
Saga natoliae is found in Montenegro, Albania, North Macedonia, Bulgaria, Greece and Turkey. This species prefers hot, arid habitats with abundant sunlight and is typically found in shrub-rich areas such as Mediterranean maquis, scrublands, and grassy slopes dotted with bushes.
