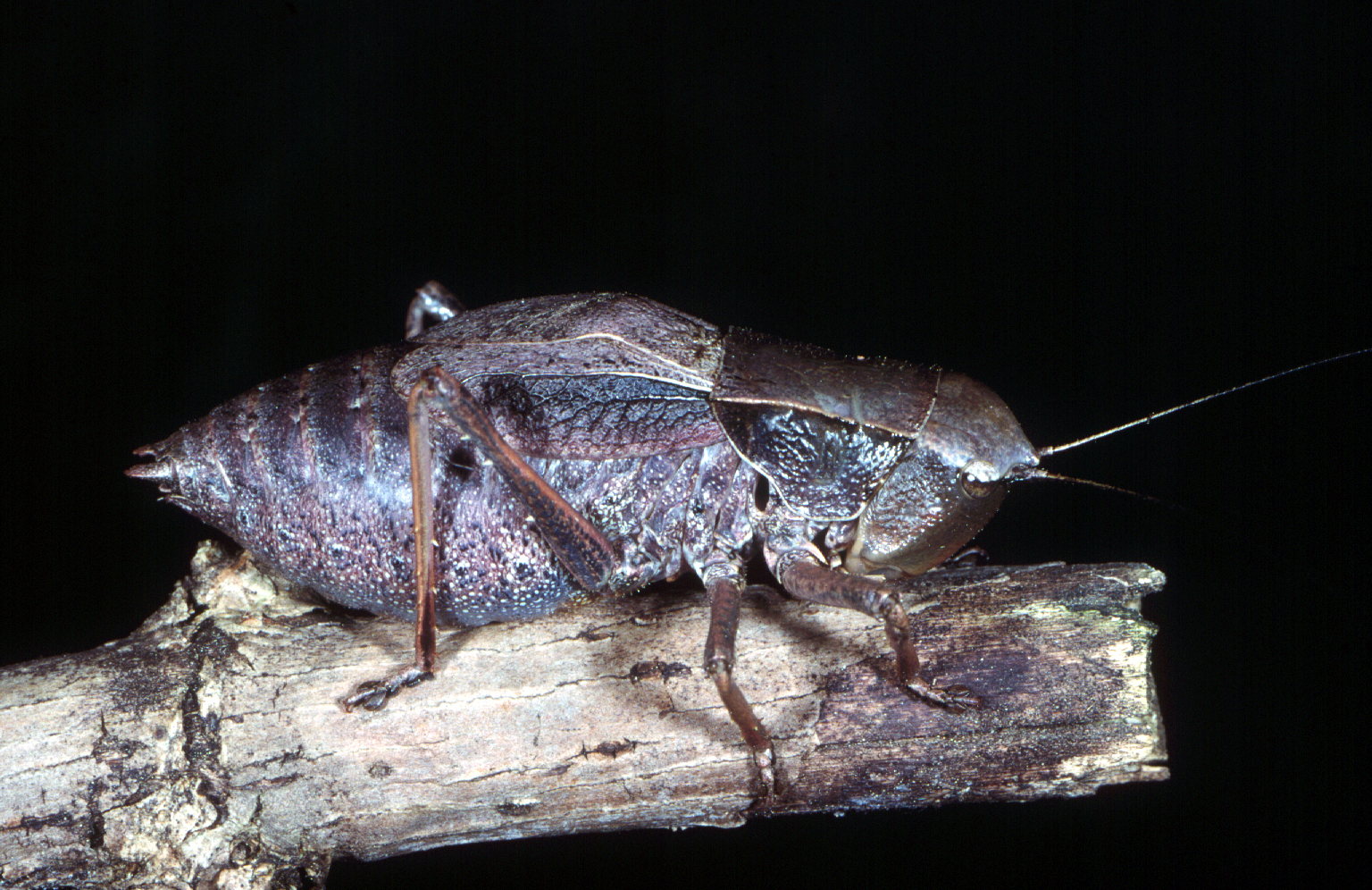
- Sciarasaga quadrata, the quadrate fan-winged katydid

Scientific classification
- Domain: Eukaryota
- Kingdom: Animalia
- Phylum: Arthropoda
- Class: Insecta
- Order: Orthoptera
- Suborder: Ensifera
- Family: Tettigoniidae
- Subfamily: Austrosaginae; Rentz, 1993

= Austrosaginae =

Subfamily of cricket-like animals

Austrosaginae, the sluggish katydids, are a subfamily of Australian insects within the family Tettigoniidae.

== Genera ==
The following genera are included:

- Austrosaga Rentz, 1993
- Hemisaga Saussure, 1888
- Pachysaga Brunner von Wattenwyl, 1893
- Psacadonotus Redtenbacher, 1891
- Sciarasaga Rentz, 1993
