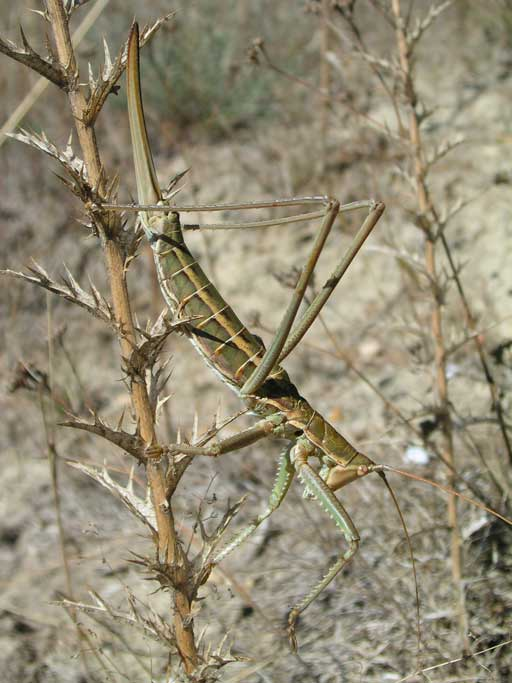
- Brown female in France

Conservation status
- Vulnerable (IUCN 3.1) (globally)

- Least Concern (IUCN 3.1) (Europe)

Scientific classification
- Kingdom: Animalia
- Phylum: Arthropoda
- Clade: Pancrustacea
- Class: Insecta
- Order: Orthoptera
- Suborder: Ensifera
- Family: Tettigoniidae
- Genus: Saga
- Species: S. pedo

Binomial name
- Saga pedo (Pallas, 1771)
- Distribution of Saga pedo (outdated)

= Saga pedo =

Species of cricket-like animal

Saga pedo is a species of wingless bush cricket from the southern half of Europe and western and central Asia. This brown or green bush cricket typically has a total length, from the head to the tip of the ovipositor, of up to 10.5 cm (4.1 in), but exceptionally it may reach 12 cm (4.7 in), which makes it one of the largest European insects and one of the world's largest Orthoptera (grasshoppers, crickets and alike). The head-and-body alone typically is 5–7 cm (2.0–2.8 in) long in adults, but may reach up to 7.8 cm (3.1 in).

Colloquially known as the predatory bush cricket, or the spiked magician (due to the "enchanting" manner in which it waves its forelimbs as it approaches its prey), it is unusual due to its strictly carnivorous lifestyle and its parthenogenetic reproduction (only females exist and they breed by themselves).

== Feeding ==
Saga pedo is a predator that feeds mostly on other Orthoptera, but also frequently on mantises, especially the European mantis. On occasion it may feed on other types of insects and rarely even small lizards. S. pedo also has a tendency towards cannibalism, but adults do not appear to cannibalise other adults. Nymphs are predatory like the adults, but there is also a record of a nymph feeding on nectar.

S. pedo is highly stealthy and well-camouflaged, either brown or green with a pale stripe along its side. The manner of catching prey is not unlike that of mantises. For this purpose, it has strong fore and mid legs, equipped with sharp spines. When these animals are hunting, they walk about, usually quite slowly and commonly swaying back and forth to resemble vegetation moved by the wind, trying to ambush their prey. Once in range, the prey is caught by suddenly leaping on it and grabbing it with the spiny legs. Their prey is usually killed by biting into the throat or neck, and eating is done at capture. Adults of S. pedo primarily are active at dusk and during the first part of the night, with lower levels of daytime activity. Unlike the adults, the nymphs are generally active during the day.

== Life cycle ==
A few weeks after reaching maturity, the female begins laying eggs and she will continue for the remainder of her adult life, which can be up to half a year. The female's pointed ovipositor, which typically is about 3–4 cm (1.2–1.6 in) long, equalling slightly more than half her head-and-body length, is inserted into the soil at a suitable site to deposit the eggs. The eggs are among the largest known for an insect, up to about 12 mm (0.47 in) long and 4 mm (0.16 in) wide. The female will lay from twenty-five to eighty eggs. Development depends largely on the ambient temperature. At 20 °C (68 °F) or more, the eggs start to develop immediately, the nymphs hatching after approximately 40 to 85 days (again depending on the temperature). At colder conditions, the eggs enter diapause, which is a delay in development and can result in the eggs remaining buried for up to five years (mostly two to three). After hatching, which occurs no earlier than April, the nymphs go through five to seven instars before attaining sexual maturity. In the first couple of instars, the ovipositor is tiny, shorter than the cerci, and barely noticeable, but in older instars (i.e., older immatures), the ovipositor is already quite long and obvious.

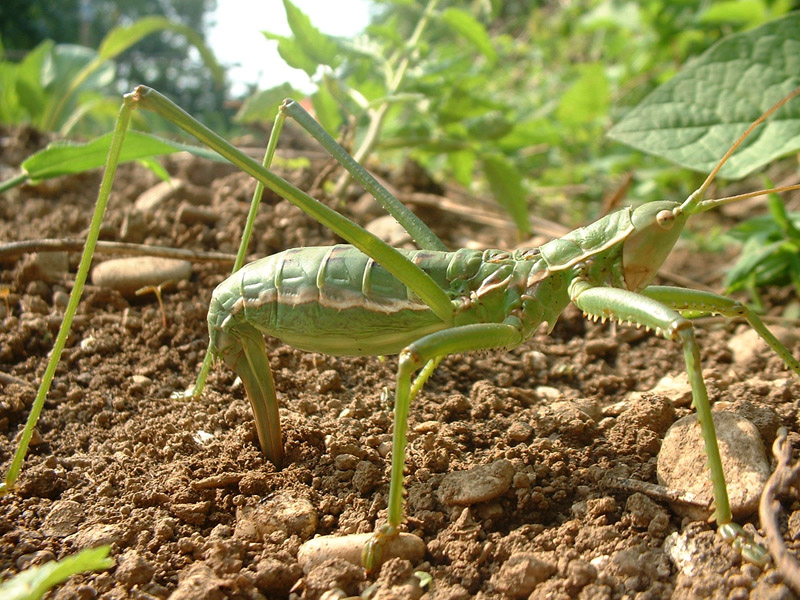
A green female laying eggs in the soil in Croatia

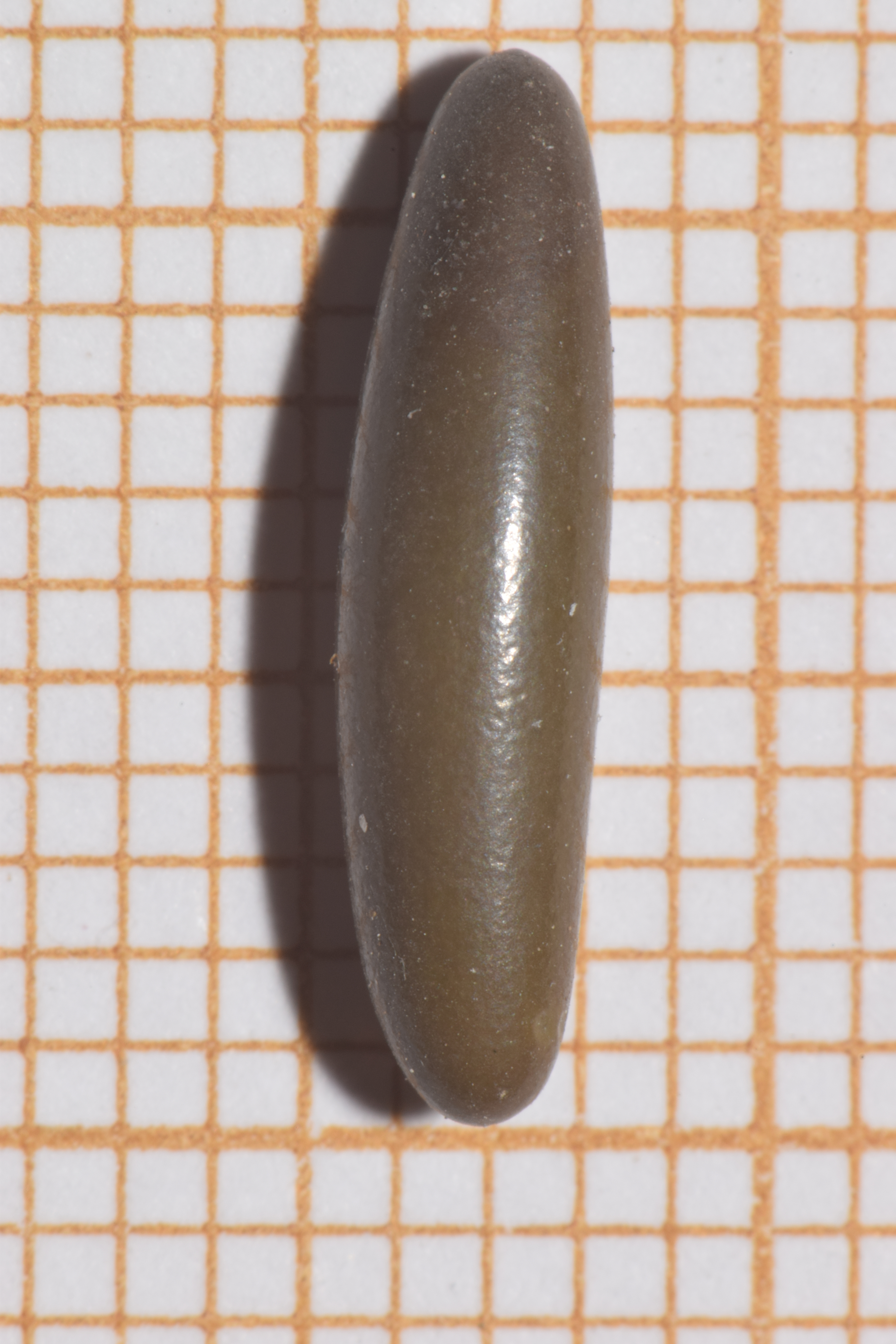
An egg in France (each square is 1×1 mm)

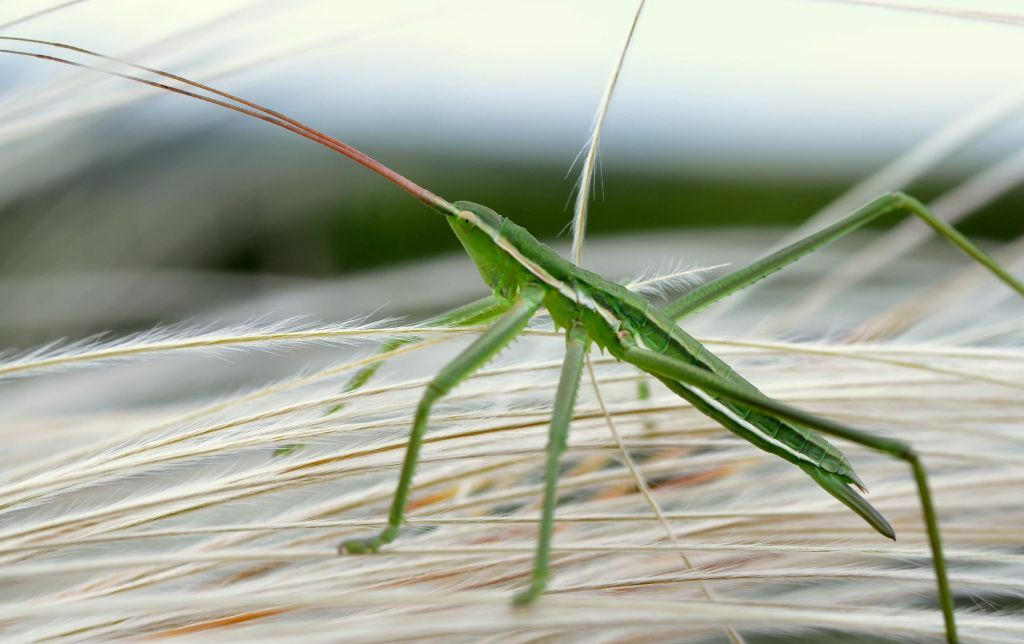
A nymph in Ukraine

=== Parthenogenesis and chromosomes ===
Saga pedo is highly unusual in that it reproduces asexually with parthenogenesis, where the female lays unfertilized eggs that develop into young females that are identical copies of their mother. The population therefore appears to consist solely of females and there is no confirmed record of a male of this species. There are a couple of old historical reports of males, but they lack evidence and are considered doubtful, and a single recent record, an apparent male photographed in Switzerland in 2005, is questionable and may well involve a female with a male-like appearance. In captivity, a female S. pedo bred with a male S. rammei, successfully producing hybrid offspring. S. pedo is a tetraploid and has 68 chromosomes. One study found 70 chromosomes, which could indicate variation in the species, but could also be the result of counting both the ordinary chromosomes and B chromosomes (B chromosomes are usually not counted).

In comparison, all other Saga species reproduce sexually with males and females, and are diploids with less than half as many chromosomes as S. pedo. Among grasshoppers, crickets and alike (Orthoptera), only S. pedo, the Euro-Asian Poecilimon intermedius, the Australian Warramaba virgo and a few others are known to be strictly parthenogenetic.

== Distribution and habitat ==
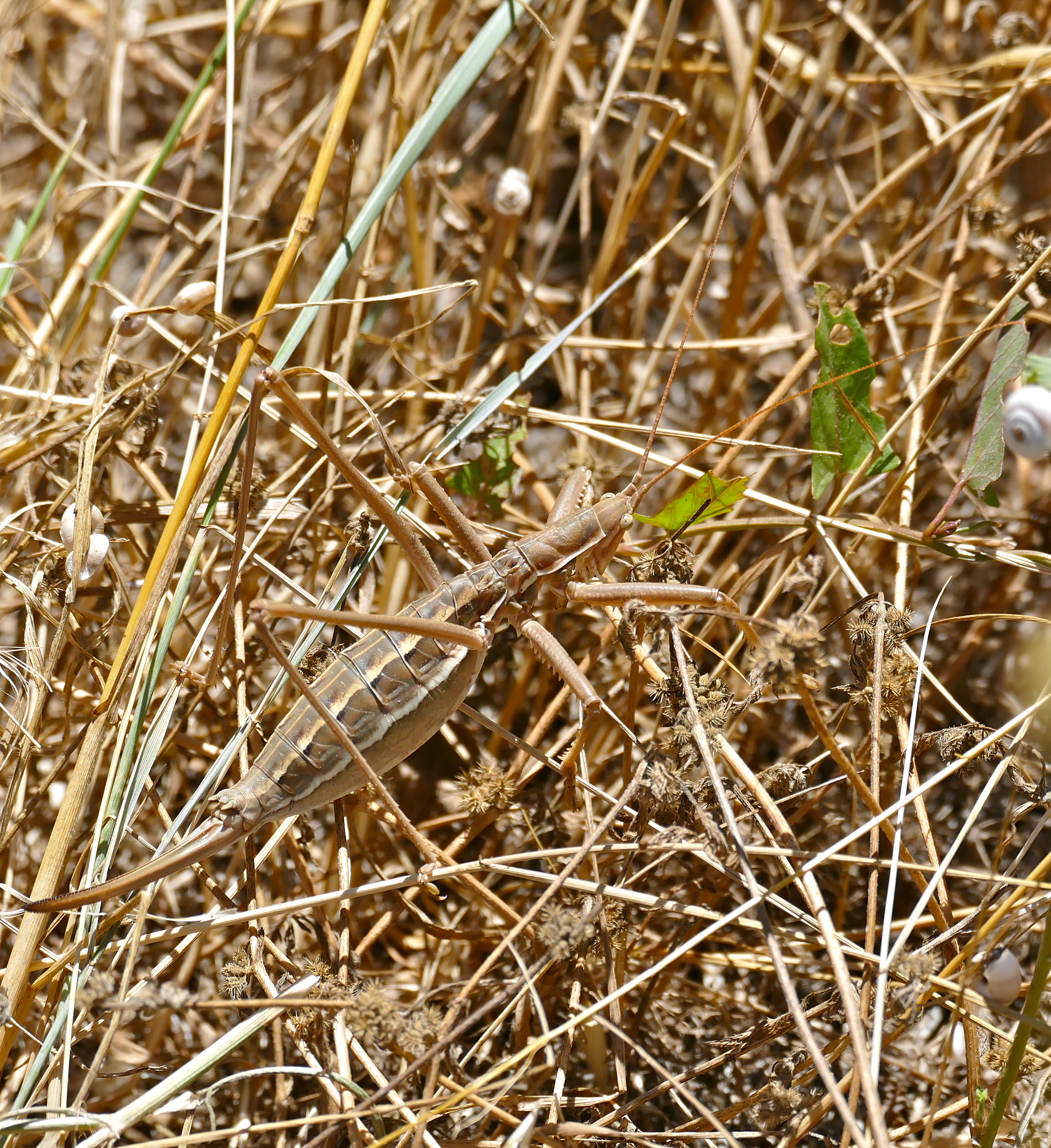
The species is easily overlooked because of its excellent camouflage, as shown by this brown female in France

Saga pedo is found in the southern half of Europe, and through western and central Asia as far east as northwestern China (Xinjiang) and southwestern Siberia. In Asia, the southernmost parts of its distribution are in southern Anatolia, Armenia, Azerbaijan, Tajikistan and Turkmenistan, and it ranges north as far as Kurgan Oblast, Russia, at latitude 54º30' N. In Europe, the southernmost places where it occurs are Italy (including Sardinia and Sicily), far northern Greece and the Iberian Peninsula (widespread but local in Spain; its presence in Portugal is questionable). In Europe outside of Russia, it occurs as far north as the Czech Republic, Slovakia and Ukraine; further west its range does not extend north of the Alpine region (it occurs in both Austria and Switzerland, but not in Germany) and in France (including Corsica) it is restricted to southern regions up to about 200 km (120 mi) from the Mediterranean coast.

This makes it the Saga species with by far the largest distribution and the one ranging most to the north, most to the west and most to the east. Other Saga species are restricted to the southern and eastern Balkans, Greek islands and Southwest Asia.

S. pedo tends to prefer areas with dry summers and mild winters, and is found in habitats from sea level to altitudes up to 1,750 m (5,740 ft). It may occur in grasslands, meadows, pastures, shrubland, thickets, plains, forest steppes, semi-open areas at the edge of forests, gorges, hedges, grain fields and vineyards.

=== North American introduction ===
Saga pedo was reported as an accidental introduction from Europe into Tompkins Township, Jackson County, Michigan (USA) in 1970. In all, only six specimens were found from 1970 to 1972, during August and September. None have been found since by a reliable authority, so they are considered extirpated from North America. There have been occasional unconfirmed sightings in subsequent decades, and catching of several specimens in Michigan from 2004 on were reported by a local high school teacher in the New York Biology Teachers Association's publication, however, this remains to be confirmed by a scholarly source.

== Conservation ==
The range of Saga pedo is vast, but the population is spread thinly, threatened by insecticide use and habitat loss. When the species was last reviewed by the IUCN on a global scale in 1996, it was considered vulnerable, but when only its European population was reviewed by the IUCN in 2016 it was considered least concern. S. pedo is listed on Appendix II of Europe's Berne Convention and on Annex IV of the European Union's Habitats Directive, meaning that it is strictly protected in these regions. Natural predators of adults are birds, rodents, lizards, frogs, and toads. Nymphs are eaten by spiders, scorpions, centipedes, and various predatory insects.
