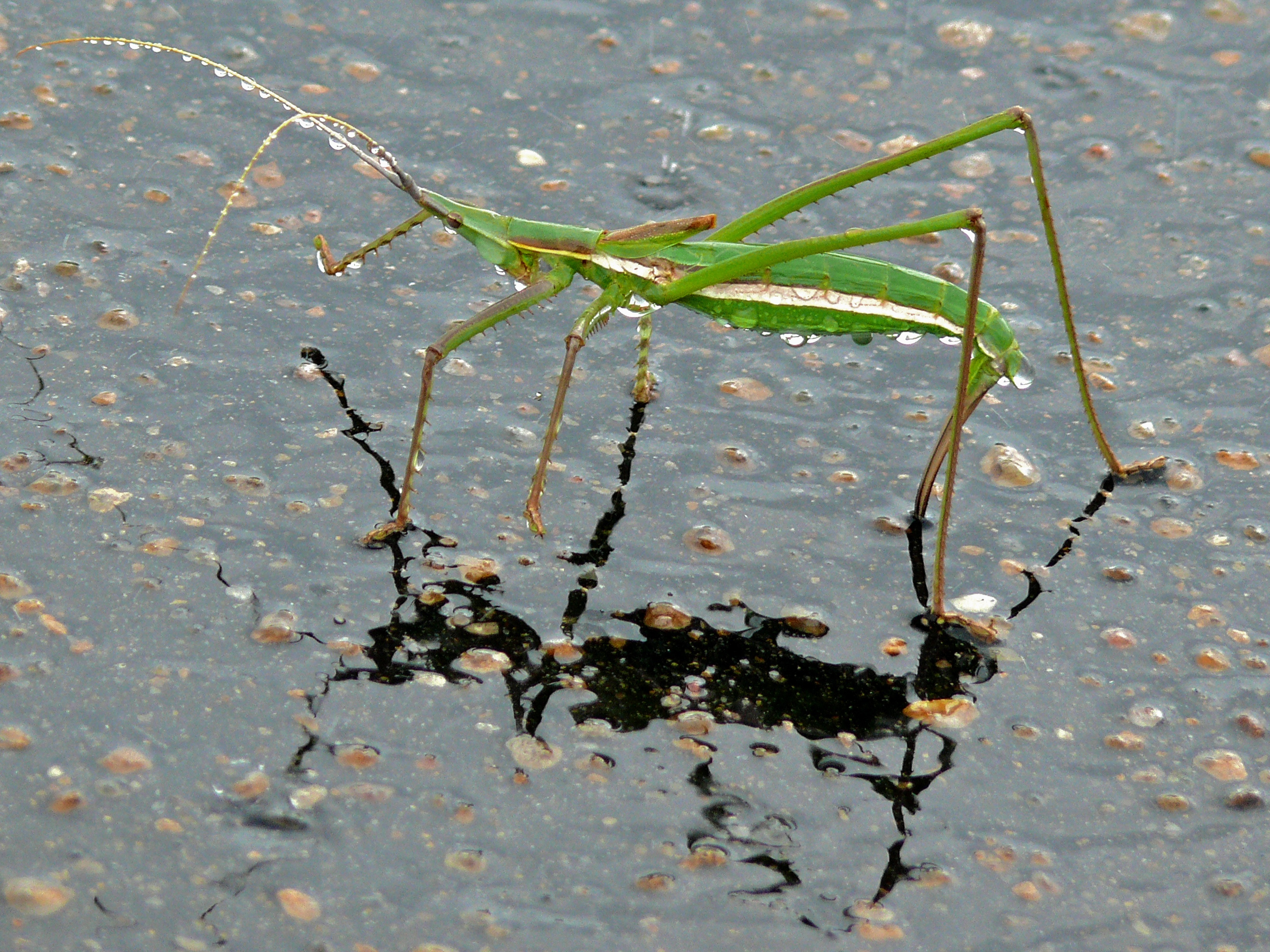
- Clonia sp., South of Olifants, Kruger NP, South Africa

Scientific classification
- Kingdom: Animalia
- Phylum: Arthropoda
- Clade: Pancrustacea
- Class: Insecta
- Order: Orthoptera
- Suborder: Ensifera
- Family: Tettigoniidae
- Subfamily: Saginae
- Genus: Clonia; Stål, 1855

Type species
- Clonia wahlbergi Stål, 1855

= Clonia (bush cricket) =

Genus of cricket-like animals

Clonia is an African genus of bush crickets in the subfamily Saginae. They are predatory insects which prey on other smaller insects.

== Species ==
The Orthoptera species file lists:

subgenus Clonia Stål, 1855

- Clonia angolana Kaltenbach, 1971
- Clonia burri Uvarov, 1942
- Clonia caudata Uvarov, 1942
- Clonia dewittei Kaltenbach, 1971
- Clonia jagoi Kaltenbach, 1971
- Clonia kalahariensis Kaltenbach, 1971
- Clonia kenyana Uvarov, 1942
- Clonia multispina Uvarov, 1942
- Clonia saussurei Kaltenbach, 1971
- Clonia uvarovi Kaltenbach, 1971
- Clonia wahlbergi Stål, 1855 - type species
- Clonia zernyi Kaltenbach, 1971

subgenus Hemiclonia Kirby, 1906

- Clonia assimilis Kaltenbach, 1971
- Clonia charpentieri Kaltenbach, 1971
- Clonia ignota Kaltenbach, 1981
- Clonia lalandei Saussure, 1888
- Clonia melanoptera (Linnaeus, 1758)

subgenus Leptoclonia Kaltenbach, 1971

- Clonia minuta (Haan, 1843)
- Clonia vansoni Kaltenbach, 1971
- Clonia vittata (Thunberg, 1789)

subgenus Xanthoclonia Kaltenbach, 1971

- Clonia tessellata Saussure, 1888
