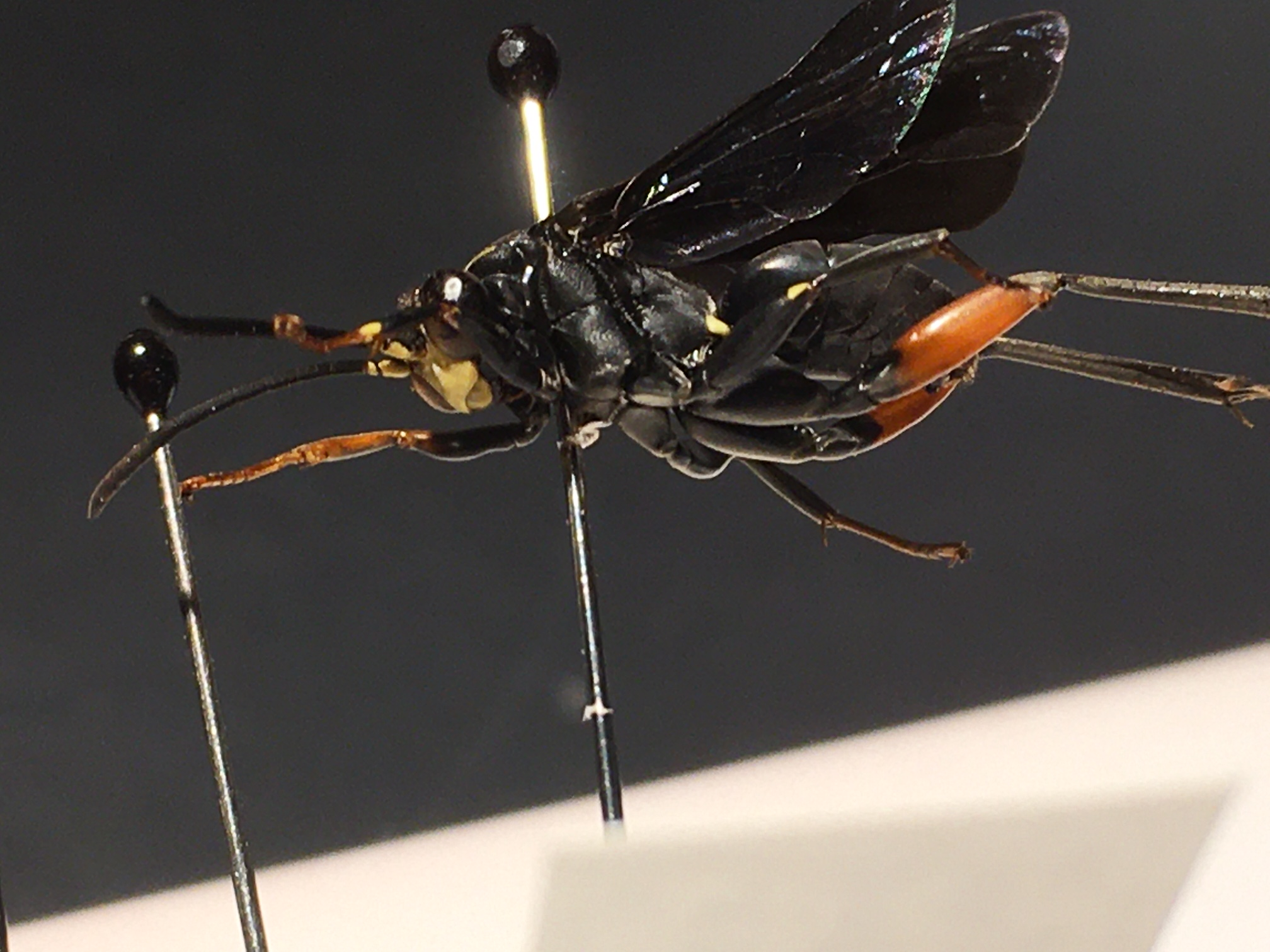
- A male specimen of Ceropales bipunctata, exhibiting the two white spots for which it is named.

Conservation status
- Apparently Secure (NatureServe)

Scientific classification
- Kingdom: Animalia
- Phylum: Arthropoda
- Clade: Pancrustacea
- Class: Insecta
- Order: Hymenoptera
- Family: Pompilidae
- Genus: Ceropales
- Species: C. bipunctata

Binomial name
- Ceropales bipunctata Say, 1824

Subspecies
- C. b. bipunctata Say, 1824; C. b. tibialis Banks, 1910

= Ceropales bipunctata =

Species of wasp

Ceropales bipunctata is a species of diurnal, kleptoparasitic spider wasp in the family Pompilidae. It is an obligate kleptoparasite, meaning that it must rely on the captured provisions of other spider wasps and cannot capture its own. It is found on the Atlantic Coast of North America, north to New Brunswick, Canada. It feeds on nectar primarily from goldenrods (especially Canada goldenrod), and also other common nectaring plants. It is known to lay an egg on the prey of other pompilids, including the two species Anoplius cleora and Anoplius aethiops. Eggs are laid in the book lung of the spider. These wasps also sometimes lay an egg on prey from spider-hunting wasps in the family Sphecidae.

== Identification ==
This species is usually characterized by the one cream colored dot on either side of the thorax.

=== Ceropales bipunctata tibialis ===
This subspecies is more black, though it still has the distinctive cream colored spot. The main difference is in that the two pairs of short legs are all red/pink, and the whole femur on the long pairs are red.

=== Ceropales bipunctata bipunctata ===
Most pictures of the species as a whole are of this subspecies, and the specimen in the photos is this subspecies as well.

== Life cycle ==
=== Eggs ===
As an obligate kleptoparasite, this species finds a spider wasp, usually Anoplius aethiops or Anoplius cleora, dragging its prey to its burrow, for provisioning a larva. It then lays an egg in the book lung. The original captor continues dragging it to its burrow, where the captor lays an egg on the prey. The larva of the Ceropales wasp develops faster than the other larva, or the larva of the Ceropales wasp eats the other larva as well. The wasps use prey of spider-hunting sphecid wasps, such as a Sceliphron caementarium, as well.

=== Larva ===
The larva eats the non-vital organs, avoiding the vital ones. The larva then consumes the vital organs in the last instar.

=== Pupa ===
The larva then makes a pupa, and will emerge later in the year.

== Geographic distribution ==
This species can be found in the Atlantic Coast of North America, up to New Brunswick, Canada. This population extends West as far as Ohio. There is a separate population in the Midwest, in Missouri and Arkansas. It is unknown whether there are continuous populations linking those on the Atlantic Coast and the Midwest. The tibialis subspecies is found only in North and South Carolina. The other populations are made up of only the subspecies C. b. bipunctata. It has declined significantly in parts of its range, more specifically in Ontario. Until recently, it was thought to be declining in New Brunswick as well, however new research has found it to be common in certain dune systems there. it is an under collected species, with scattered specimens. The species is not protected.

=== Habitat ===
C. bipunctata inhabits dune systems, as well as open fields. The species appears to inhabit open areas.
