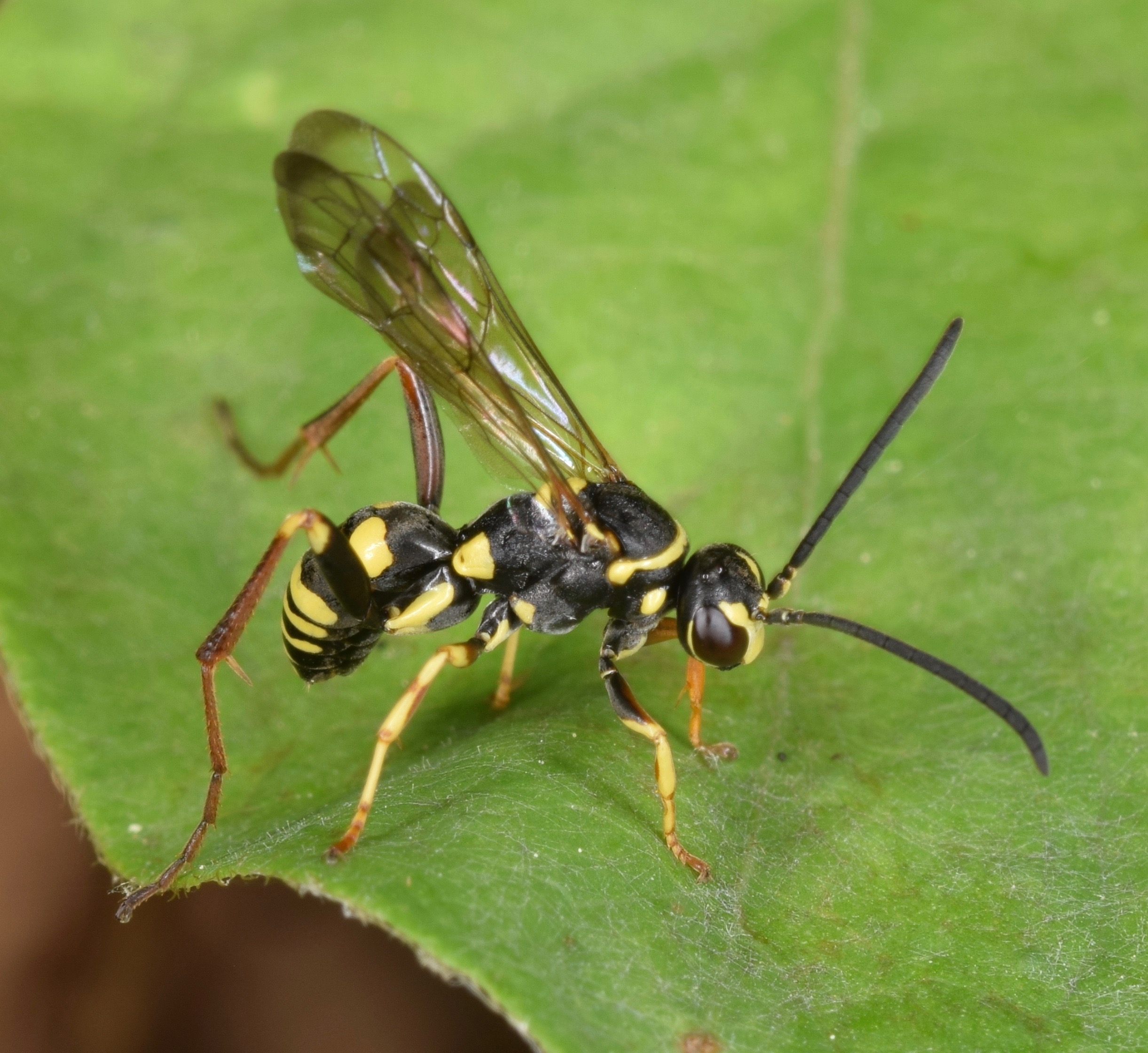
- Ceropales maculata fraterna

Scientific classification
- Kingdom: Animalia
- Phylum: Arthropoda
- Clade: Pancrustacea
- Class: Insecta
- Order: Hymenoptera
- Family: Pompilidae
- Genus: Ceropales
- Species: C. maculata

Binomial name
- Ceropales maculata (Fabricius, 1775)

Synonyms
- Ceropales semiannulatus; Ceropales tristis; Ceropales balearica

= Ceropales maculata =

Species of wasp

Ceropales maculata is a kleptoparasitic spider wasp, belonging to the family Pompilidae. this species is found in the Holarctic region.

== Taxonomy ==
Ceropales maculata was first formally described as Evania maculata in 1775 by the Danish zoologist Johan Christian Fabricius with its type locality given as England. This species is now classified in the genus Ceropales which is one of two genera in the subfamily Ceropalinae within the spider wasp family Pompilidae.

=== Subspecies ===
- Ceropales maculata caenosa Townes, 1957
- Ceropales maculata fraterna Smith, 1855
- Ceropales maculata maculata (Fabricius, 1775)
- Ceropales maculata major Costa, 1888
- Ceropales maculata rhodomerus Townes, 1957
- Ceropales maculata stretchii Fox, 1892

== Description ==
Cerpales maculata is a small spider wasp. Females are 6-9 mm in length, and males are 5-7.5 mm. There are distinct with bold white markings on its black body. The legs are orange-red, with the hind legs being very long. In a British context the absence of a red band on the abdomen identifies this species from C. variegata. Males can be told apart from females by their smaller size, slender shape and in having no ovipositor protruding from the abdomen.

== Biology ==
Ceropales maculata is an uncommon spider wasp. This species intercepts other spider wasps engaged in prey transport and lays its eggs in the book lung of the captured spider. C. maculata then allows the other spider wasp to return to its nest, where the C. maculata larvae hatch, search for, find and eat the host egg, before it consumes the spider.

Spider wasps kleptoparasitised by C. maculata include species in the genera Priocnemis, Pompilus, Agenioideus, Arachnospila, Anoplius, Episyron and Auplopus in Britain and Europe. Other species of non-Pompilid solitary wasp which use spiders as prey, for example the crabronid Miscophus, may also be parasitised by C. maculata.

This species is univoltine; adults are seen from May to September. The adults have been observed feeding on wild carrot (Daucus carota) flowers.

== Habitat ==
Ceroplaes maculata can be found in sandy areas such as heathlands, coastal dunes and sand pits.

== Distribution ==
Ceroplaes maculata has a Holarctic distribution and is found in both North America and Eurasia.

== Gallery ==
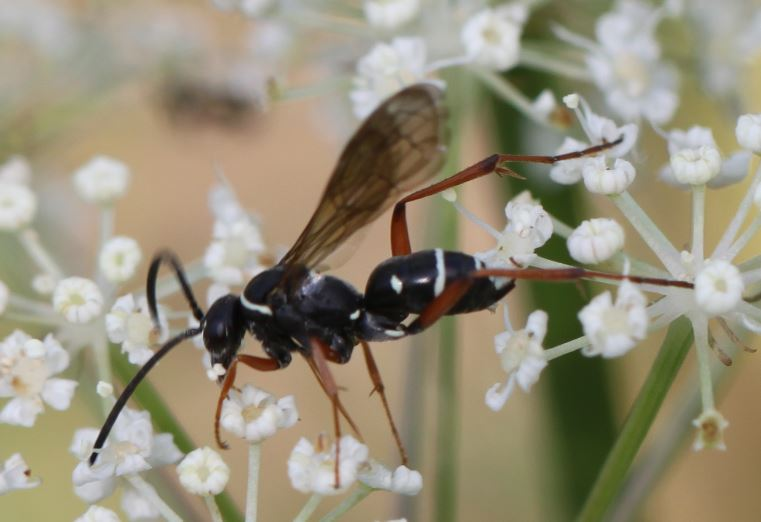
Ceropales maculata maculata in Baden-Württemberg, Germany

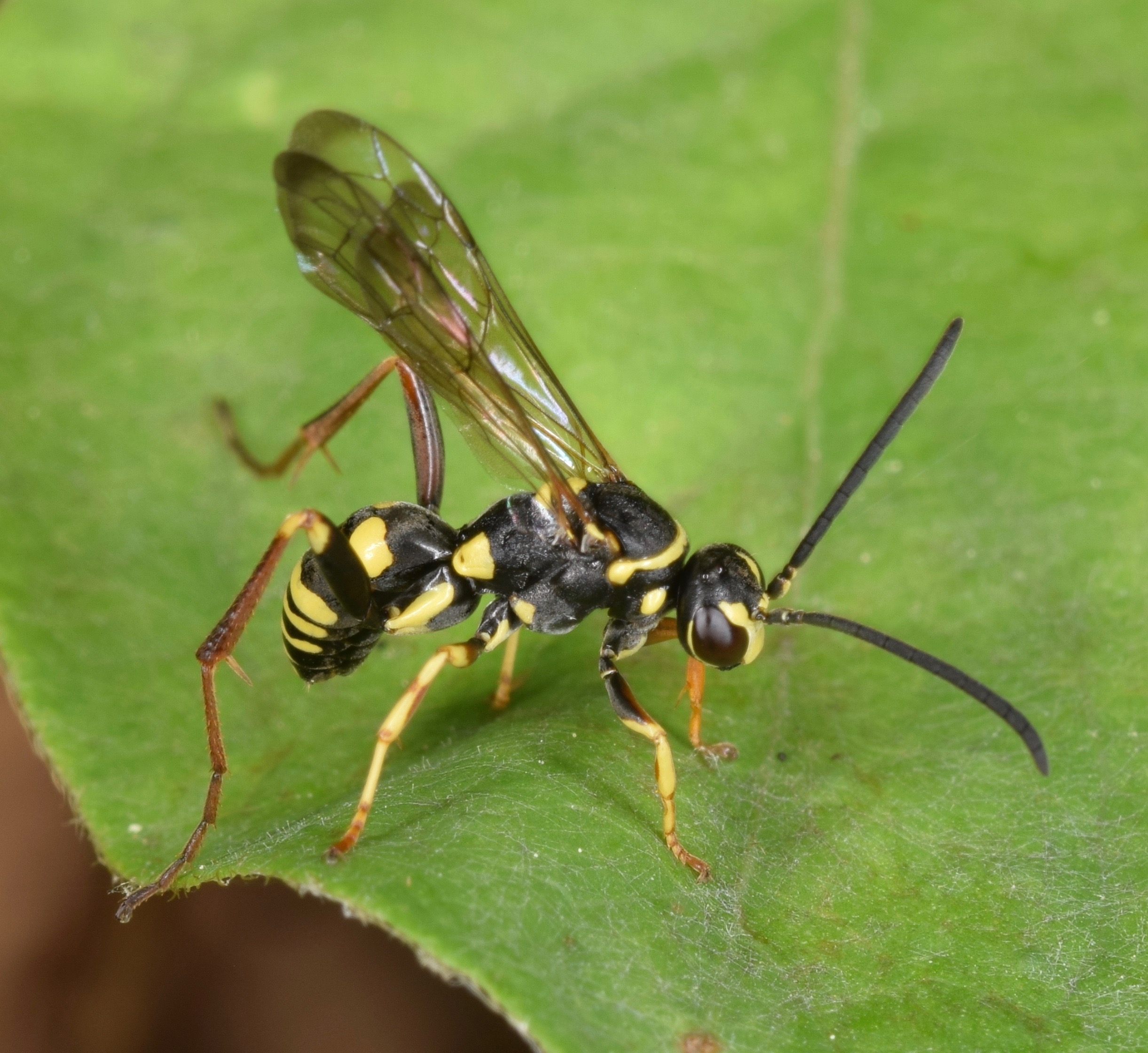
Ceropales maculata fraterna in Georgia, USA

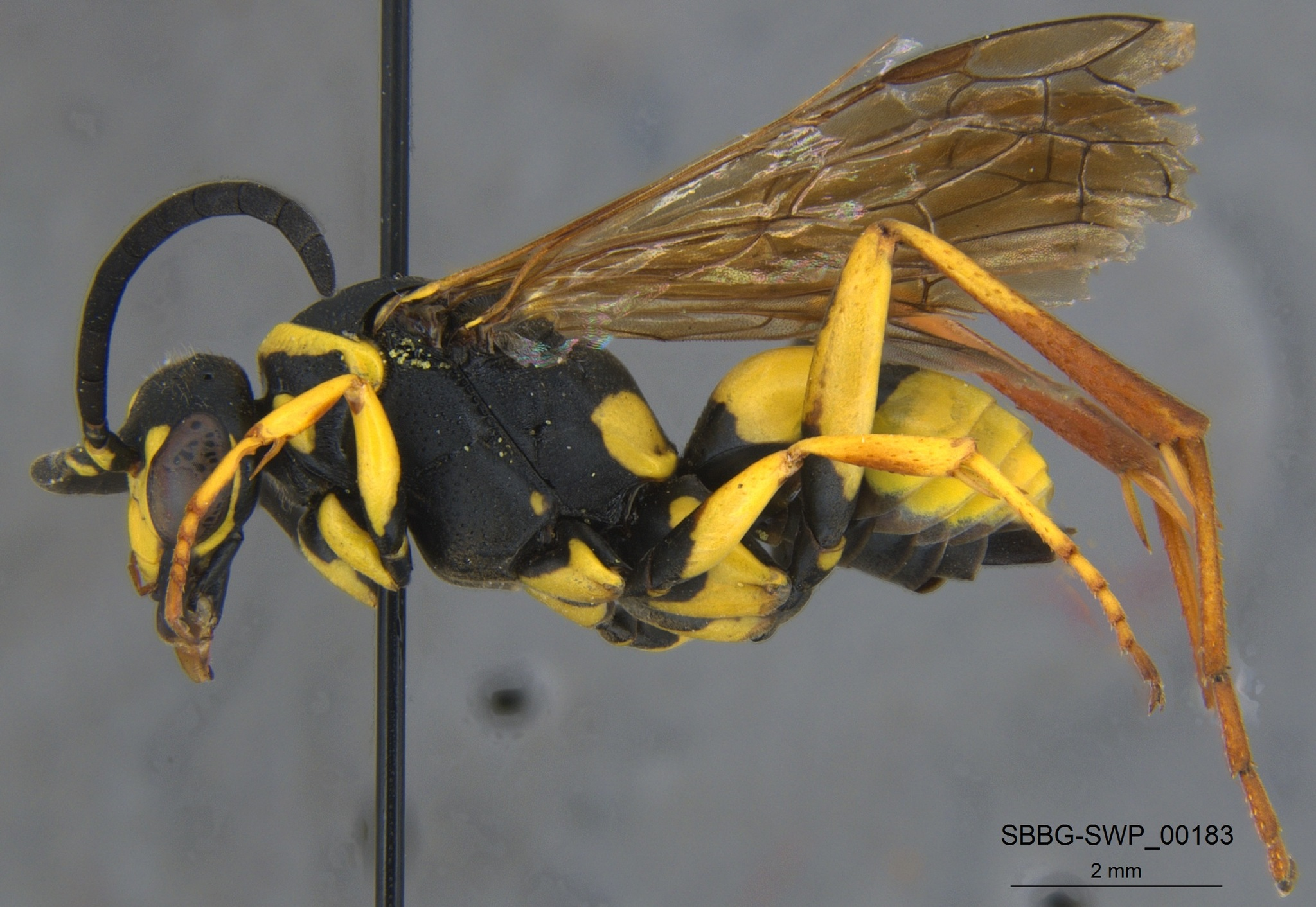
Ceropales maculata stretchii in California, USA.
