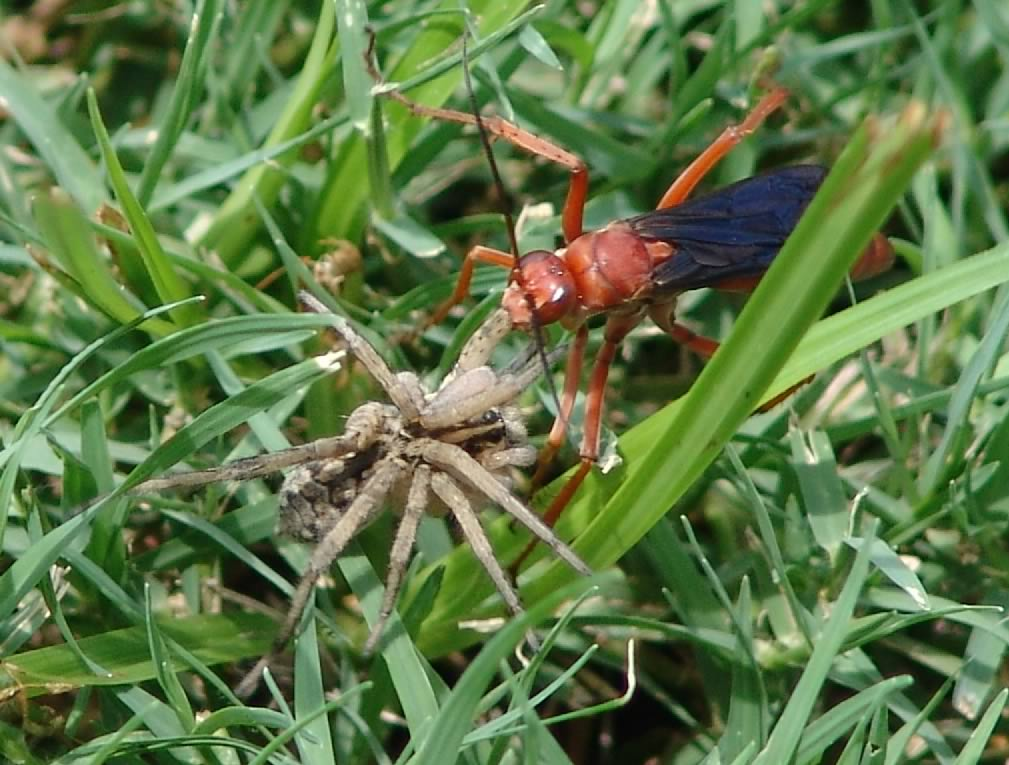
- Tachypompilus ferrugineus with prey in Rockwall, Texas

Scientific classification
- Kingdom: Animalia
- Phylum: Arthropoda
- Clade: Pancrustacea
- Class: Insecta
- Order: Hymenoptera
- Family: Pompilidae
- Genus: Tachypompilus
- Species: T. ferrugineus

Binomial name
- Tachypompilus ferrugineus Say, 1824

Synonyms
- Pompilus torridus (Smith, 1862); Arachnophroctonus annexus (Banks, 1944); Arachnophroctonus nigrescens (Banks, 1944); Arachnophroctonus unicolor (Banks, 1944); Tachypompilus yavapai (Evans, 1950)

= Tachypompilus ferrugineus =

Species of wasp

Tachypompilus ferrugineus, the rusty spider wasp, red-tailed spider hunter, or sometimes red-tailed spider wasp (but that name is also used for the Asian species Tachypompilus analis) is a species of spider wasp from the Americas. It preys mainly on wandering spiders, especially wolf spiders.

== Description ==
A mostly reddish-brown wasp, with four narrow dark bands circling the abdomen, and with violet-blue wings its body measures 15–25 mm (0.59–0.98 in) in length.

== Distribution ==
This wasp is from as far north as Canada south through the United States, Mexico, and Central America to South America and the Caribbean.

== Taxonomy ==
The nine recognised subspecies of T. ferrugineus include:

- Tachypompilus ferrugineus annexus
- Tachypompilus ferrugineus bicolor Banks, Hispaniola and Cuba.
- Tachypompilus ferrugineus ferrugineus Say, the nominate subspecies from the south eastern United States.
- Tachypompilus ferrugineus nigrescens Banks, found in the more northerly part of the species range in the eastern United States
- Tachypompilus ferrugineus torridus Banks, the Sonoran Desert and adjacent regions of southern California, southern Utah, southwestern New Mexico, western Texas south to Chiapas, Mexico

However, the subspecies T.f. nigrescens from the northeastern United States may be a melanistic morph of the nominate subspecies rather than a valid taxon in its own right.

== Biology ==
In Illinois, adults have been recorded as feeding on nectar from Rhus copallina, Cicuta maculata, Eryngium yuccifolium, Oxypolis rigidior, Pastinaca sativa, Asclepias incarnata, Erechtites hieracifolia, and Pycnanthemum tenuifolium. In California, the adults of both sexes have been collected while feeding on aphid honeydew and at flowers of Hazardia squarrosa, while females alone have been taken at flowers of Celosia floribunda and males at Eriogonum fasciculatum, Koeberlinia spinosa, and Melilotus albus. In Syracuse, New York, males have been observed feeding on Daucus carota.

During a period of observation in a cemetery in Syracuse, males were observed perched on the top of a monument with their antennae and legs outstretched and wings held flat along the dorsum. They chased one another from their favoured sites and pursued incoming females in flight. Both male and female wasps sheltered within a crevice close to the base of the monument at night and when it rained. Up to eight wasps (four males, four females) could occupy this space at the same time.

When copulation was observed, the sequence was that a male and a female landed almost simultaneously very near each other on one side of the monument near the base. They walked slowly toward each other, both scissoring their wings (whereas vertical wing flicking is normal in spider wasps). They closed to within 2 cm of each other, face to face, scissoring their wings and vibrating their outstretched antennae. The much smaller male then flew to the rear of the female, mounted her while facing in the same direction as her, and assumed a position towards the rear of her abdomen. The male grasped the rear edge of her fore wings with his tarsal claws and curved his abdomen beneath hers to make contact with her genitalia. His fore tarsi then grasped the sides of her first gastral segment. The pair remained coupled but stationary for 27 seconds before separating, at which point the female flew off and was followed by the male for a distance of 1 m.

Females have been observed dragging leaves into their nests in Ohio This wasp takes mainly large spiders of the families Lycosidae, Pisauridae, and Ctenidae with a preponderance of Lycosa wolf spiders, with the two main spider species caught being Tigrosa helluo and Rabidosa rabida. The female grasps the prey spider by its chelicerae or pedipalps and drags it along the ground walking backwards. In southern Canada, the dark fishing spider Dolomedes tenebrosus has been recorded as prey for this spider wasp. In Florida, Hogna timuqua has also been recorded as prey. The nest is often located under trees or buildings; dry, powdery soil is preferred for nest construction. The nest is a simple depression in the soil which the female wasp excavates by raking with her anterior legs and tamping down with her metasoma. The wasp drags the spider into the depression and an egg is deposited on the abdomen, near the base. The female wasp then backfills the depression by raking in soil and tamping with her metasoma. The nest is the camouflaged with pieces of debris collected from the vicinity of the nest. The wasp larva that emerges will then feed on the live paralyzed spider.
