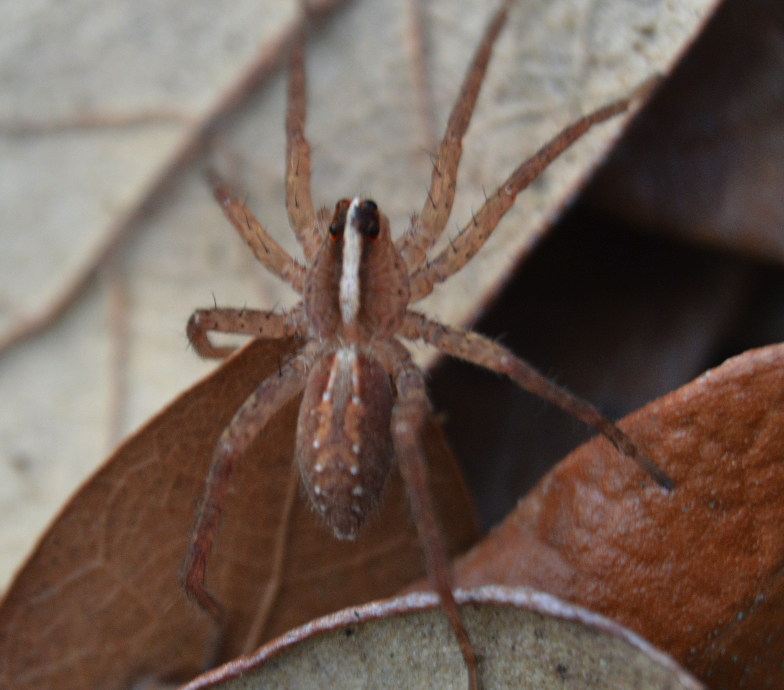
- Rabidosa hentzi in Lady Lake, Florida
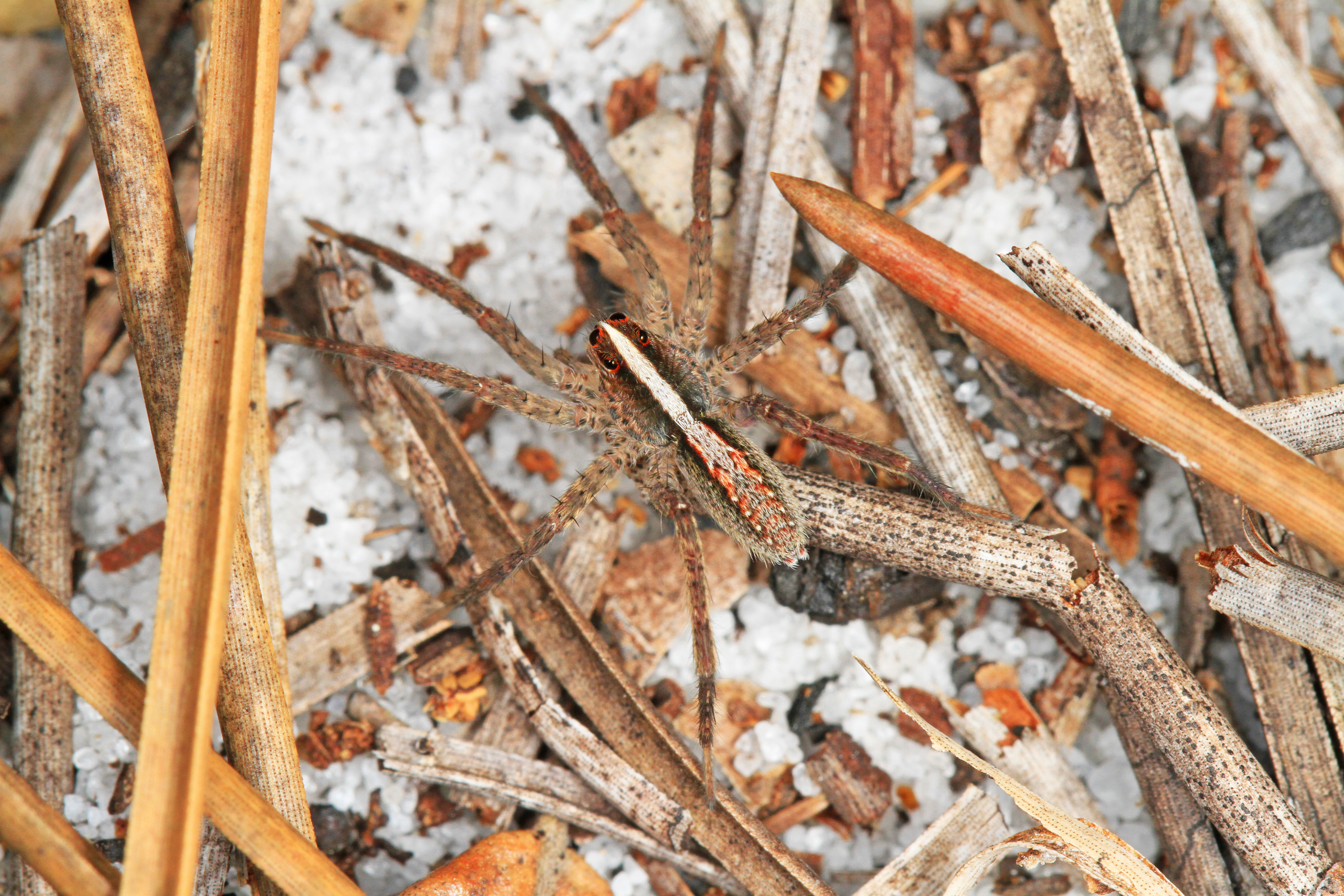
- Rabidosa hentzi from Lake Placid, Florida

Scientific classification
- Kingdom: Animalia
- Phylum: Arthropoda
- Subphylum: Chelicerata
- Class: Arachnida
- Order: Araneae
- Infraorder: Araneomorphae
- Family: Lycosidae
- Genus: Rabidosa
- Species: R. hentzi

Binomial name
- Rabidosa hentzi Banks, 1904

Synonyms
- Lycosa hentzi; Megarctosa hentzi

= Rabidosa hentzi =

Species of spider

Rabidosa hentzi is a small species of wolf spider found in North America. Most identified specimens were found in Florida, though some have been found in Georgia and Louisiana. Its color is like that of Rabidosa carrana or Rabidosa rabida, but it is distinguished from other Rabidosa species by its paler color and distinct striped pattern on its back. The cephalothorax is a pale brown-yellow color. Between these is a narrower bright yellow to white streak that extends past the eyes. The sternum and abdomen are both pale, though the upper sides are streaked and spotted with brown markings. The eyes are on a black band that extends back, fading into the pale brown. The spermathecae are round and the palea of the pedipalp has a sclerotized cap. Males and females have a similar face and chelicera, though that of males is usually lighter brown. Males will generally have fewer lateral brown markings on the abdomen than females. In the field, it can be distinguished from similar looking species by the thin yellow stripe on its back. Though usually a ground-dweller, due to scopula hairs on the tarsi and metatarsi, it can sometimes climb into shrubs and bushes. It is the only wolf spider that climbs up into the higher vegetation in open woodland.
