= Irenangelus =

Scientific classification
- Kingdom: Animalia
- Phylum: Arthropoda
- Clade: Pancrustacea
- Class: Insecta
- Order: Hymenoptera
- Family: Pompilidae
- Subfamily: Ceropalinae
- Genus: Irenangelus; Schulz, 1906

Type species
- Irenangelus hornus Schulz, 1906

Genus of wasps

Irenangelus is a genus of kleptoparasitic spider wasps in the subfamily Ceropalinae of the family Pompilidae. The genus has a pantropical distribution, occurring in the Oriental, Neotropical, Australian, eastern Palearctic, and Madagascan zoogeographic regions, with the highest diversity found in the Neotropics.

Irenangelus is closely related to the more widespread genus Ceropales, with both forming a monophyletic subfamily, Ceropalinae, within the Pompilidae. This subfamily is the sister group to the subfamily Notocyphinae. Current research suggests that Ceropalinae and other pompilids evolved from a common ectoparasitoid ancestor.

== Biology ==
In the Philippines, species of Irenangelus are known to be kleptoparasites of Auplopus nyemitawa and Tachypompilus analis. I. eberhardi is a kleptoparasite of Auplopus semialatus. The kleptoparasitic behavior of I. lukosanus has been observed as it pursues its host pompilid, Platydialepis ryoheii, while the latter transports its prey, Heteropoda forcipata, to its nest. The kleptoparasitic wasp pounces on the spider and extends its gaster, attempting to insert the tip into a slit of the prey's book lung.

== Species ==
Some species included in Irenangelus include:

- Irenangelus clarus (Evans, 1969)
- Irenangelaus crossopus (Kimsey & Wasbauer, 2004)
- Irenangelus eberhardi (Evans, 1987)
- Irenangelus evansi (Kimsey & Wasbauer, 2004)
- Irenangelus furtivus (Evans, 1969)
- Irenangelus hikosamis (Wahis, 2007)
- Irenangelus hispaniolae (Evans, 1969)
- Irenangelus ichneumoides (Ducke, 1908)
- Irenangelus intrusus Banks
- Ireangelus lucidus (Evans, 1969)
- Irenangelus lukosanus (Wahis, 2007)
- Irenangelus luzonensis (Rohwer, 1919)
- Irenangelus madescassus (Wahis, 1988)
- Irenangelus mexicanus (Turner 1917)
- Irenangelus nambui (Shimizu, 2007)
- Irenangelus pernix (Bingham, 1896)
- Irenangelus punctipleuris (Wahis, 2007)
- Irenangelus reversus (Smith, 1873)
- Irenangelus townesorum (Evans, 1969)
- Irenangelus tucumanus (Evans, 1969)
