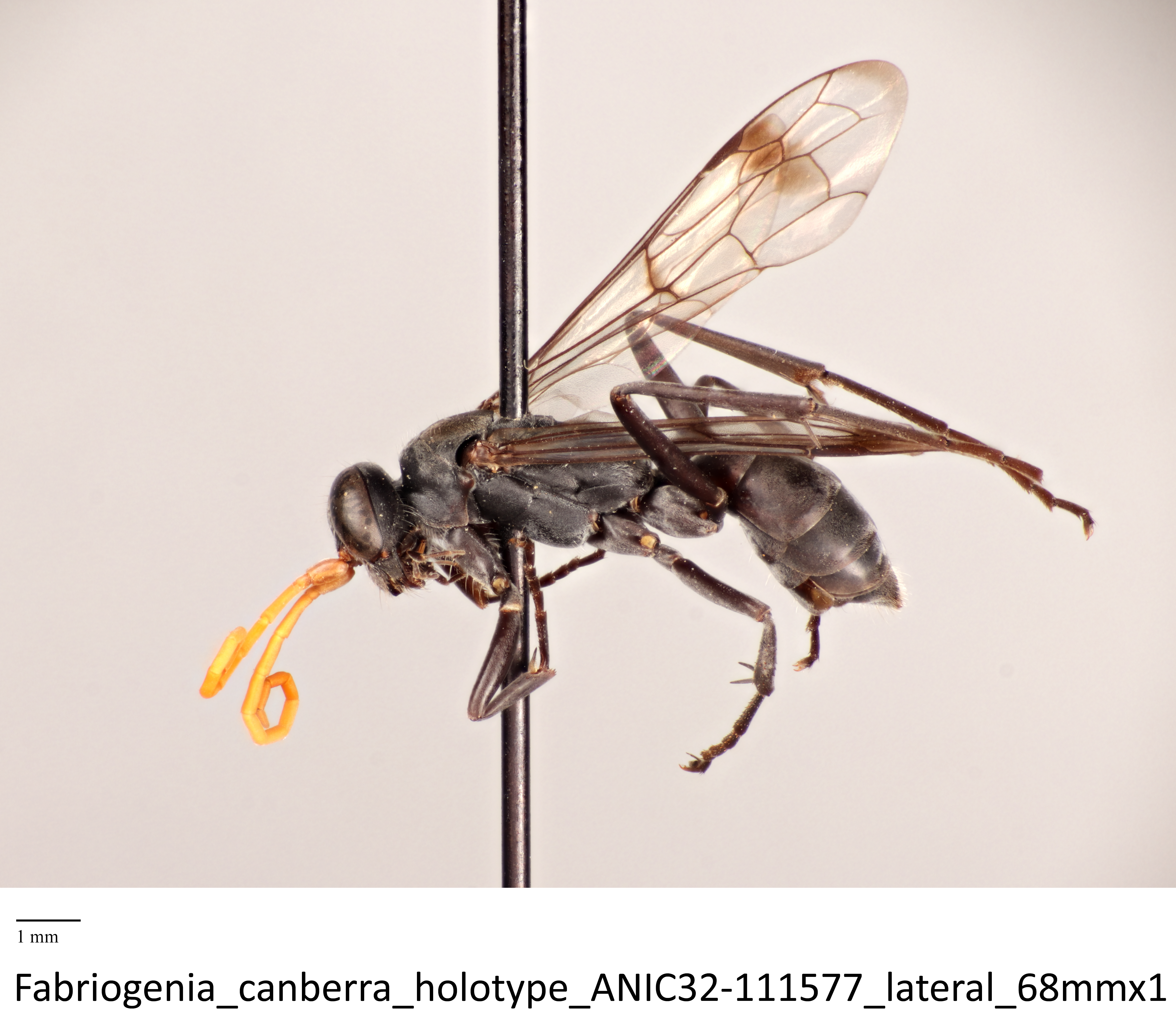

Scientific classification
- Domain: Eukaryota
- Kingdom: Animalia
- Phylum: Arthropoda
- Class: Insecta
- Order: Hymenoptera
- Family: Pompilidae
- Genus: Auplopus
- Species: A. canberra

Binomial name
- Auplopus canberra (Evans, 1972)

Synonyms
- Fabriogenia canberra Evans, 1972

= Auplopus canberra =

Species of insect

Auplopus canberra is a species of spider wasp within the genus Auplopus. It was originally described by Howard Ensign Evans based on a holotype from Canberra, Australia.

== Description ==
Length is up to 9 mm with legs and body being black. Antennae are bright orange except on the scape and a weak darkening on the apical segment. Body colour, wings and hair are the same as A. dilga but the difference is in A. canberra having a longer antennae and longer postnotum. Differences also exist in the shape of the clypeus and wing venation details
