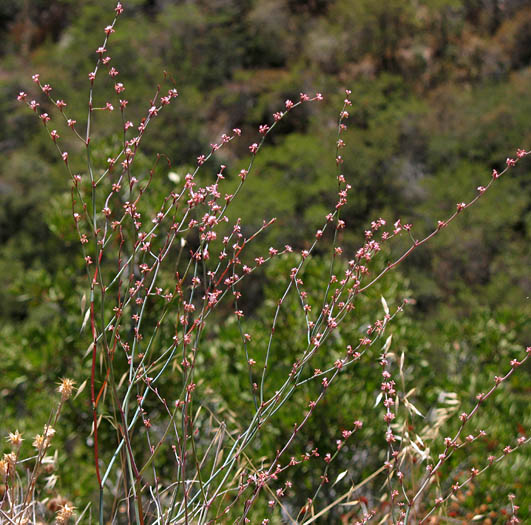

Conservation status
- Vulnerable (NatureServe)

Scientific classification
- Kingdom: Plantae
- Clade: Tracheophytes
- Clade: Angiosperms
- Clade: Eudicots
- Order: Caryophyllales
- Family: Polygonaceae
- Genus: Eriogonum
- Species: E. cithariforme

Binomial name
- Eriogonum cithariforme S.Watson

Varieties
- E. c. var. agninum; E. c. var. cithariforme

Synonyms
- Eriogonum agninum

= Eriogonum cithariforme =

Species of wild buckwheat

Eriogonum cithariforme is a species of wild buckwheat known by the common name cithara buckwheat.

It is endemic to the Transverse Ranges and Southern Outer California Coast Ranges of Southern California. It grows in sandy areas in a number of local habitat types, such as chaparral.

== Description ==
Eriogonum cithariforme is an annual herb growing up to about half a meter in maximum height with a spreading or erect flowering stem with many upcurved branches.

The wavy, woolly leaves are round to oval in shape and are mainly located about the base of the stem. They are greenish in colour.

The inflorescence is lined with many clusters of white to pinkish flowers with a dark central stripe. At 3-4mm in size these flowers are large compared to most other genus members. In younger plants inflorescence clusters are limited to branch junctions, but in age clusters are born along the upper stem as well.

== Taxonomy ==
In 1888 Sereno Watson scientifically described a new species in the Eriogonum genus, which he named Eriogonum cithariforme. In 1958 Philip Alexander Munz published a description of it as a variety of Eriogonum gracile, but the species is accepted according to Plants of the World Online. Alongside the rest of the genus it is classified in the Polygonaceae family and the species has two accepted varieties.

- Eriogonum cithariforme var. agninum
- Eriogonum cithariforme var. cithariforme

There is on synonyms of the species and four of variety agninum.

Table of Synonyms
Name	Year	Rank	Synonym of:	Notes
Eriogonum agninum Greene	1891	species	var. agninum	≡ hom.
Eriogonum gracile var. cithariforme (S.Watson) Munz	1958	variety	E. cithariforme	≡ hom.
Eriogonum gracile var. polygonoides (S.Stokes) Munz	1958	variety	var. agninum	= het.
Eriogonum vimineum var. agninum (Greene) S.Stokes	1936	variety	var. agninum	≡ hom.
Eriogonum vimineum subsp. polygonoides S.Stokes	1936	subspecies	var. agninum	= het.
Notes: ≡ homotypic synonym; = heterotypic synonym
