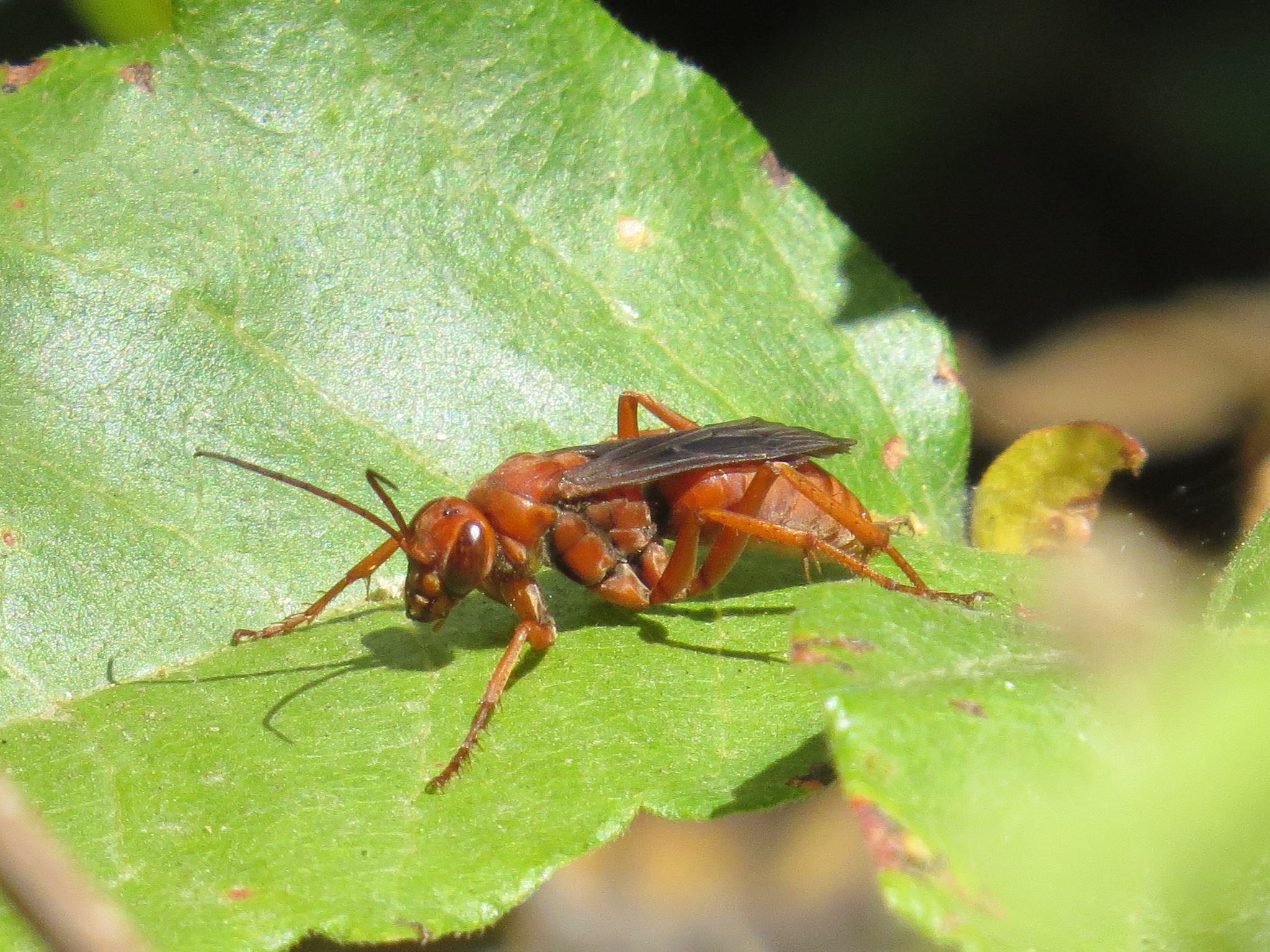
- San Mateo County, California, 2021

Scientific classification
- Kingdom: Animalia
- Phylum: Arthropoda
- Clade: Pancrustacea
- Class: Insecta
- Order: Hymenoptera
- Family: Pompilidae
- Genus: Tachypompilus
- Species: T. unicolor

Binomial name
- Tachypompilus unicolor Banks, 1919

= Tachypompilus unicolor =

Species of wasp

Tachypompilus unicolor, known as the western red-tailed spider wasp or red-tailed spider hunter, is a species of spider wasp from western North America.

== Description ==
Especially in the subspecies T. u. cerinus, the body is often entirely red, with yellow, dark-margined wings.

== Distribution ==
It is found in Southern California, including the northern Baja California and the Channel Islands, north to the Okanagan Valley, southern British Columbia, eastwards through southwestern Idaho to western South Dakota and northern Utah.

== Biology ==
Adults of T. unicolor feed at honeydew secretions and flowers. Females have been captured at honeydew from galls of Disholcapsis eldoradensis on Quercus lobata and at flowers of Asclepias erosa, Baccharis sarothroides, Chrysothamnus sp., Lepidospartum squamatum, and Wislizenia refracta. Males have been taken on the flowers of Calochortus catalinae, Hemizonia fasciculata, Rhamnus californica, and Xanthium spinosum. Both males and females visit the extrafloral nectaries of Helianthus and have been collected at flowers of Atriplex semibaccata, Cicuta sp., Eriogonum fasciculatum, Eriogonum gracile, and Foeniculum vulgare. The flight period in California is from May to October, with a peak in July and August.

== Subspecies ==
- T. u. cerinus Evans in the eastern part of the species range
- T. u. unicolor Banks, distinguished by darker, often violaceous wings and having the mesosoma frequently being partially black, predominantly in the males, western part of the range
