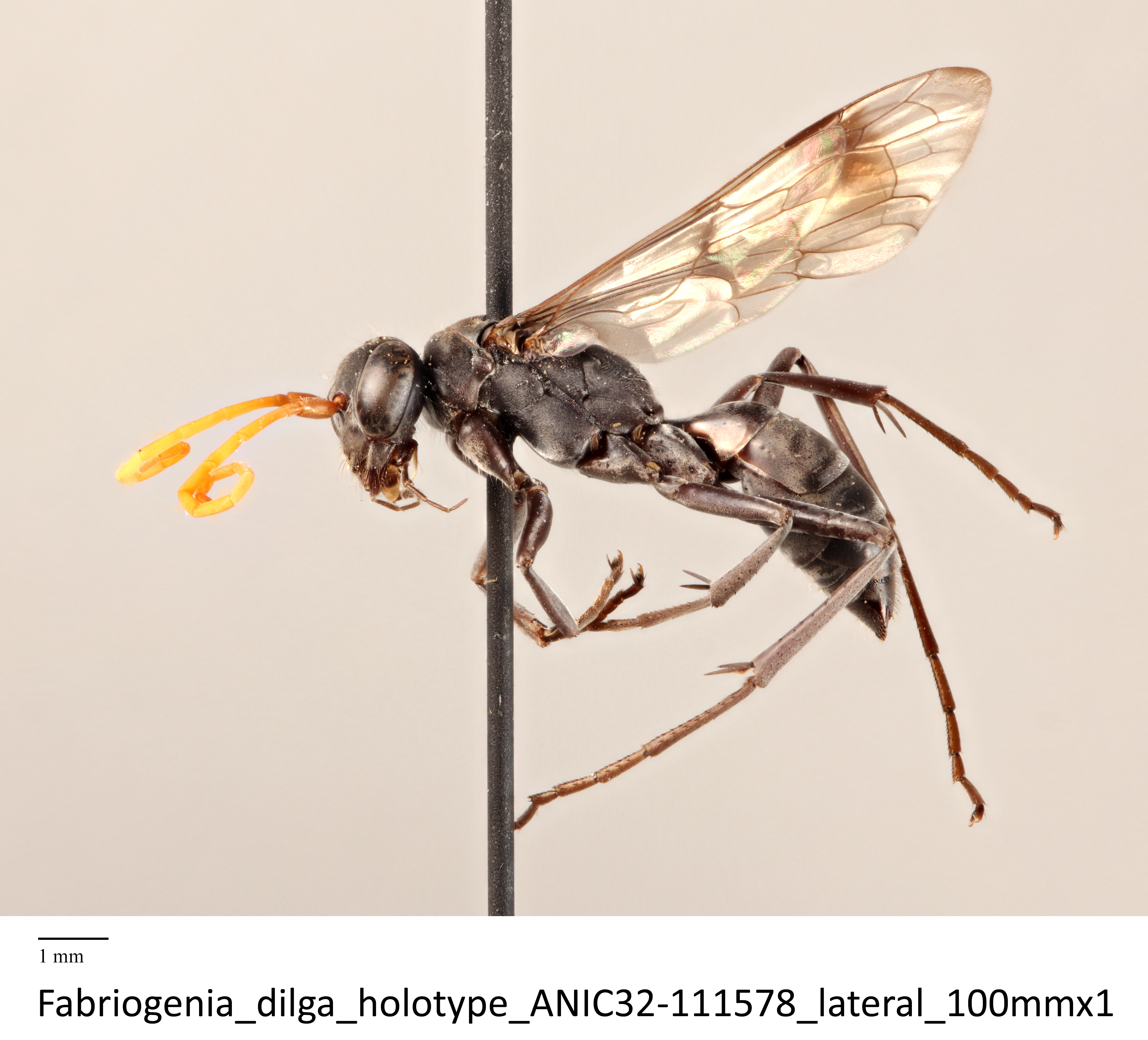

Scientific classification
- Domain: Eukaryota
- Kingdom: Animalia
- Phylum: Arthropoda
- Class: Insecta
- Order: Hymenoptera
- Family: Pompilidae
- Genus: Auplopus
- Species: A. dilga

Binomial name
- Auplopus dilga (Evans, 1972)

Synonyms
- Fabriogenia dilga Evans, 1972

= Auplopus dilga =

Species of insect

Auplopus dilga is a species of spider wasp within the genus Auplopus. It was described by Howard Ensign Evans.

== Description ==
The body colour, wings and hair are the same as A. canberra, but A. dilga differs in having a shorter antennae and a shorter postnotum. Differences also exist in the shape of the clypeus and wing venation details. Evans noted in his description that "dilga" is an Australian Aboriginal word from New South Wales that means "a stick of wood". He assumed the species nests in cavities in wood since his examples were reared from a trap-nest.
