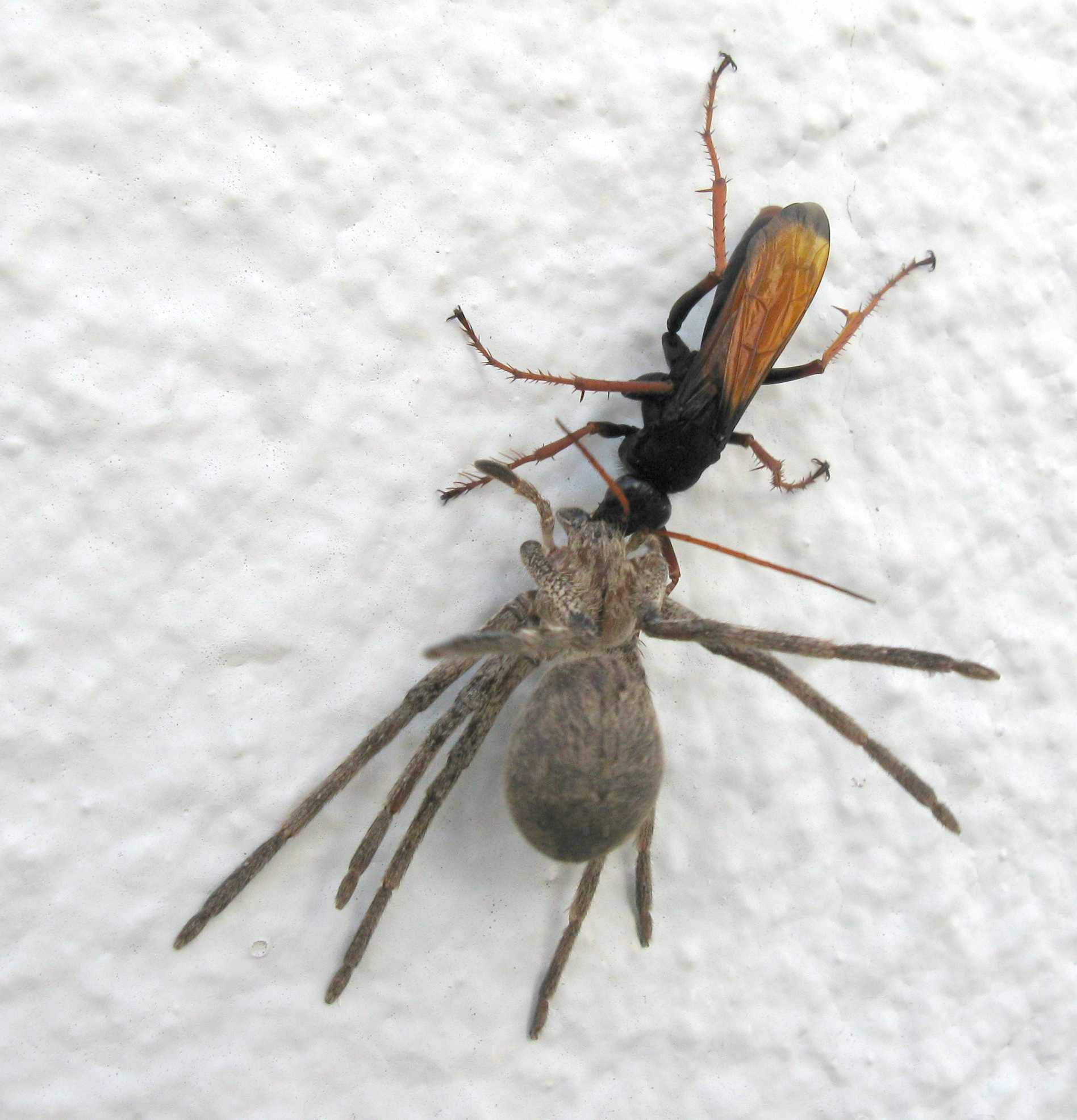
- Tachypompilus ignitus

Scientific classification
- Domain: Eukaryota
- Kingdom: Animalia
- Phylum: Arthropoda
- Class: Insecta
- Order: Hymenoptera
- Family: Pompilidae
- Subfamily: Pompilinae
- Genus: Tachypompilus; Ashmead, 1902

Type species
- Tachypompilus abbotti Ashmead, 1902

= Tachypompilus =

Genus of insects

Tachypompilus is a genus of spider wasps, found in the Neotropics Nearctic, eastern Palearctic, Indomalayan and Afrotropics.

== Species ==
The species included in Tachypompilius include:

- Tachypompilus analis (Fabricius, 1781) red-tailed spider wasp
- Tachypompilus atratus (Colomo de Correa, 1985)
- Tachypompilus banksi (Colomo de Correa, 1985)
- Tachypompilus erubescens (Taschenberg, 1869)
- Tachypompilus ferrugineus (Say, 1824) rusty spider wasp
- Tachypompilus gracilis (Colomo de Correa, 1985)
- Tachypompilus ignitus (Smith, 1855) rain spider wasp
- Tachypompilus larssoni (Kurczewski, 2007)
- Tachypompilus latus (Smith)
- Tachypompilus mendozae (Dalla Torre, 1897)
- Tachypompilus ovambo (Arnold, 1937)
- Tachypompilus pallidus (Banks, 1947)
- Tachypompilus praepotens (Kohl, 1894)
- Tachypompilus rubiginosus (Taschenberg)
- Tachypompilus torridus (Cresson)
- Tachypompilus unicolor (Banks, 1919) red-tailed spider hunter
- Tachypompilus vitripennis (Arnold, 1937)
- Tachypompilus vulpes (Dalla Torre)
- Tachypompilus xanthopterus (Rohwer, 1913)
