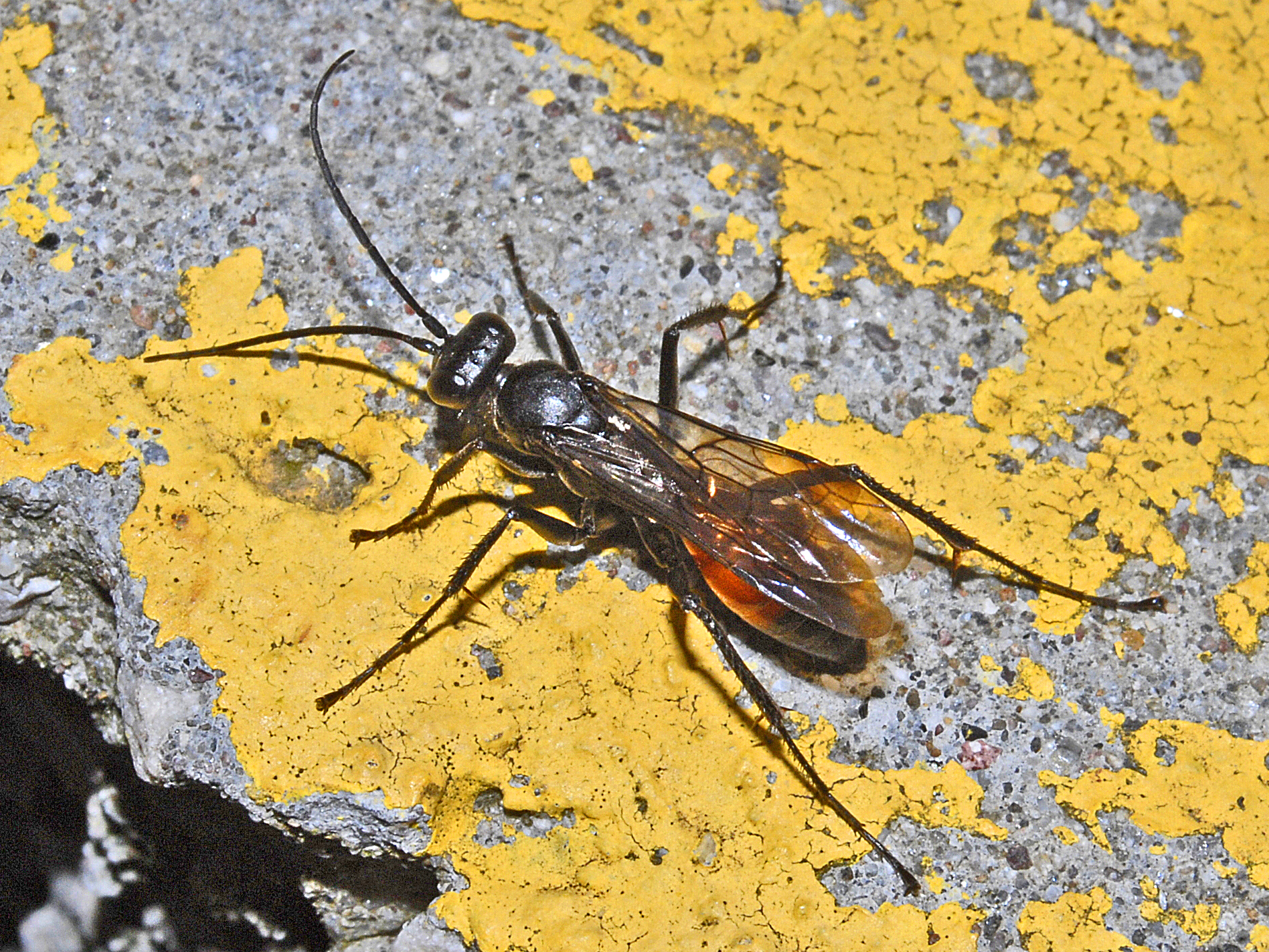

Scientific classification
- Domain: Eukaryota
- Kingdom: Animalia
- Phylum: Arthropoda
- Class: Insecta
- Order: Hymenoptera
- Family: Pompilidae
- Genus: Auplopus
- Species: A. albifrons

Binomial name
- Auplopus albifrons (Dalman, 1823)

= Auplopus albifrons =

Species of wasp

Auplopus albifrons is a spider wasp of the family Pompilidae.

== Description ==
Auplopus albifrons are medium-sized wasps, with short petiole on first abdominal segment and red first abdominal terga. Females typically have long legs, slender body and long curling antennae. They show an elongated clypeal margin.

== Biology ==
The females build their brood cells of mud on walls or stones. They prey on various species of spiders. The female wasps usually amputate the legs of their prey before transporting them to the nest to make them easier to carry. Prey may be transported by flight or more often by crawling along the ground. Captured spiders are stored in cells in the nest. The female wasp lays an egg on each spider and later the wasp larvae feed and develop on the spider.

== Habitat ==
The species prefers warmer areas and occurs in light forests and dry open woodland.

== Distribution ==
This species is present in Austria, Bosnia, Denmark, Finland, France, Germany, Greece, Italy, Romania, Spain and Switzerland.

== Subspecies ==
- Auplopus albifrons albifrons (Dalman, 1823)

== Bibliography ==
- Wahis, R. - Mise à jour du Catalogue systématique des Hyménoptères Pompilides de la région ouest-européenne. Additions et Corrections. Notes fauniques de Gembloux 59 (1) 31-36
- Wahis, R. - Catalogue systématique et codage des Hyménoptères Pompilides de la région ouest-européenne. Notes fauniques de Gembloux 12: 1-91
- Vikberg, 1986 - A checklist of aculeate Hymenoptera of Finland (Hymenoptera, Apocrita Aculeata) Not. Ent. 66 (2): 65-85
