= Ceropales elegans =

Scientific classification
- Domain: Eukaryota
- Kingdom: Animalia
- Phylum: Arthropoda
- Class: Insecta
- Order: Hymenoptera
- Family: Pompilidae
- Genus: Ceropales
- Species: C. elegans

Binomial name
- Ceropales elegans Cresson, 1872

Subspecies
- Ceropales elegans elegans; Ceropales elegans quaintancei

Species of wasp

Ceropales elegans is a spider wasp species in the genus Ceropales. It is found in Texas.
