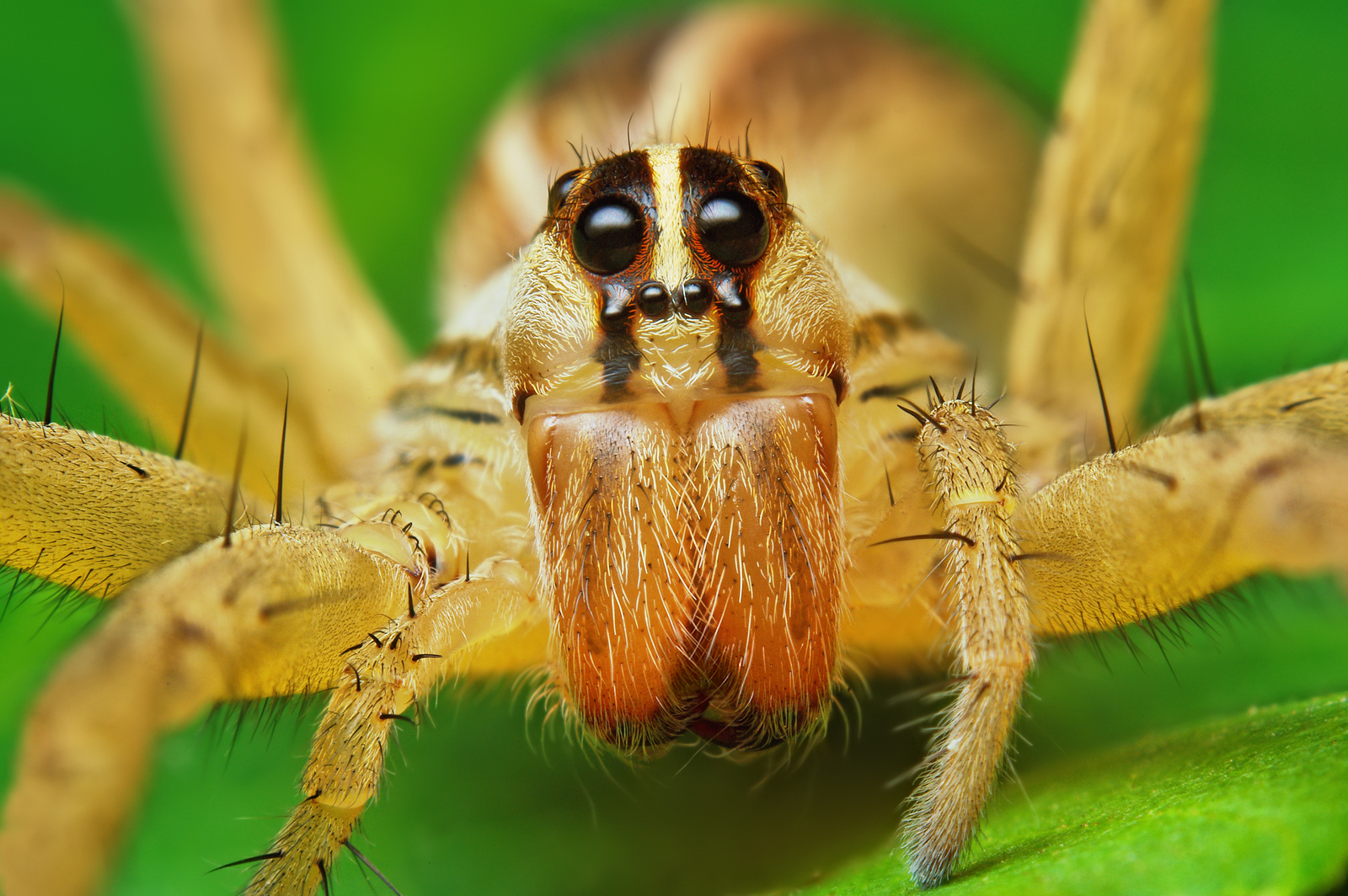
- Rabidosa rabida female

Scientific classification
- Kingdom: Animalia
- Phylum: Arthropoda
- Subphylum: Chelicerata
- Class: Arachnida
- Order: Araneae
- Infraorder: Araneomorphae
- Family: Lycosidae
- Genus: Rabidosa; Roewer, 1860

Species
- See text

= Rabidosa =

Genus of spiders

Rabidosa is a genus of spiders described by Roewer (1960). The family is Lycosidae. It contains the following species:

- Rabidosa carrana (Bryant, 1934) — USA
- Rabidosa hentzi (Banks, 1904) — USA
- Rabidosa punctulata (Hentz, 1844) — USA
- Rabidosa rabida (Walckenaer, 1837) — North America
- Rabidosa santrita (Chamberlin & Ivie, 1942) — USA
