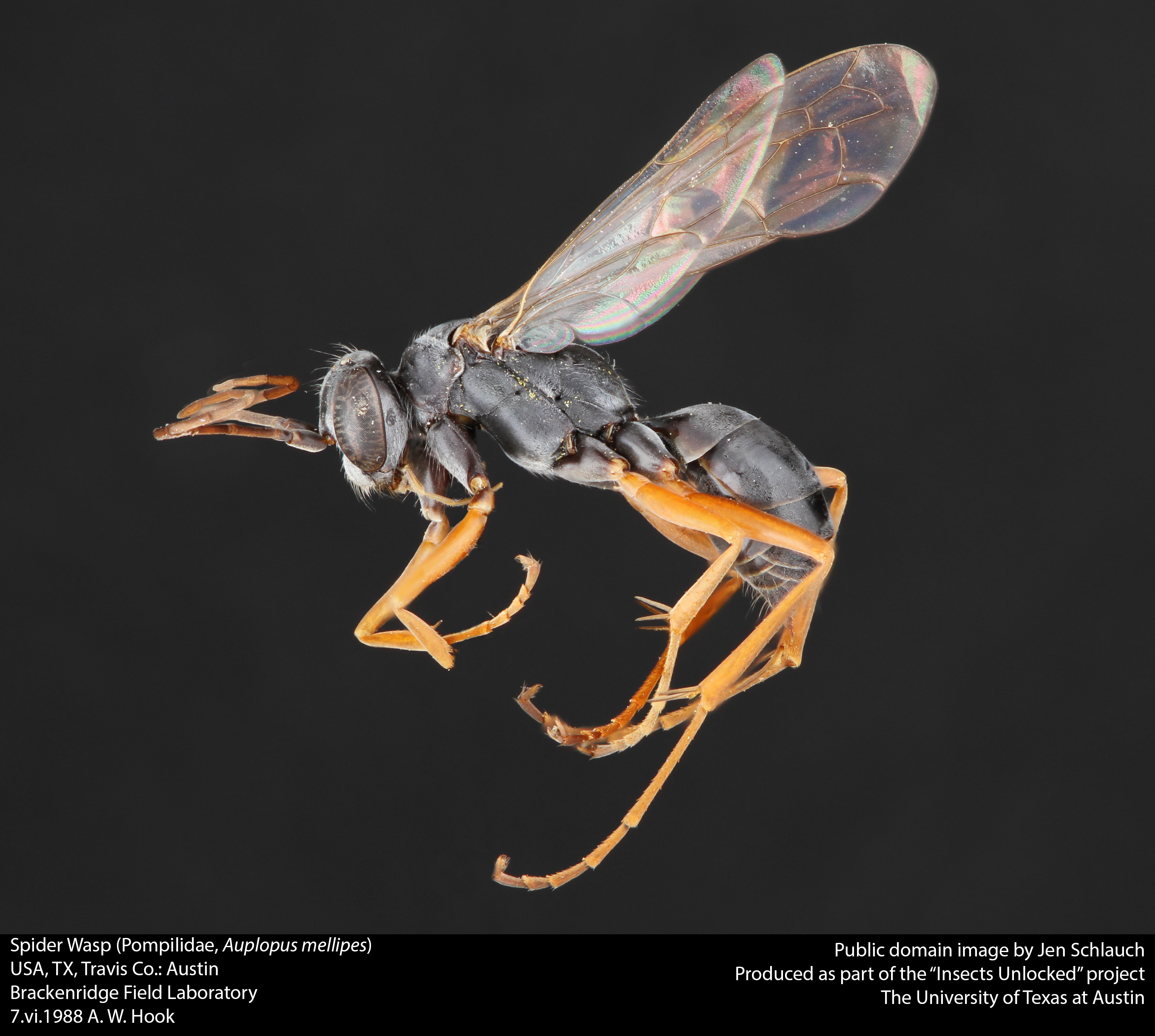

Scientific classification
- Kingdom: Animalia
- Phylum: Arthropoda
- Class: Insecta
- Order: Hymenoptera
- Family: Pompilidae
- Genus: Auplopus
- Species: A. mellipes

Binomial name
- Auplopus mellipes (Say, 1836)

= Auplopus mellipes =

Species of wasp

Auplopus mellipes is a species of spider wasp in the family Pompilidae.

== Subspecies ==
- Auplopus mellipes mellipes (Say, 1836)
- Auplopus mellipes variitarsatus (Dalla Torre, 1897)
