= Celosia floribunda =

Scientific classification
- Kingdom: Plantae
- Clade: Tracheophytes
- Clade: Angiosperms
- Clade: Eudicots
- Order: Caryophyllales
- Family: Amaranthaceae
- Genus: Celosia
- Species: C. floribunda

Binomial name
- Celosia floribunda A. Gray, 1861

Species of flowering plant

Celosia floribunda is a shrub or a small tree of the family Amaranthaceae which is endemic to Baja California Sur. It reaches a maximum height of 4 m (13 ft) The type specimen was collected by John Xantus from Cabo San Lucas in Baja California Sur in 1859 and described by Asa Gray in the Proceedings of the American Academy of Arts and Sciences Volume 5 published in 1861.

== Description ==
Celosia floribunda is a small tree or shrub with greyish-green striated upper branches which are smooth below the inflorescence. The leaves grow in lines and are very variable in size and shape with the width varying from 0.5 cm to 11 cm and the length from shape being oblong subhastate or triangularly oval tapering to a point, wedge shaped or rounded at the base with a prominent network of veins with a rough pubescent underside and hairless above. The petioles are 8–40 mm long and frequently have a thin flange of tissue along their length. The abundant flowers are sessile and arranged in long, slender loose spikes which are aggregated in dense panicles up to 30 cm in length, the sepals of the flowers are 2 mm long, papery white or straw coloured with faint venation and include 5 stamens, The stigma are round and brown in colour. Each flower produces 2–4 blackish seeds which are 1.2 mm in diameter.

== Ecology ==
Celosia floribunda is found in gravel plains and washes. The adult spider wasp Tachypompilus ferrugineus uses the flowers of C. floribunda as a nectar source. It flowers from March to October.

== Distribution ==
Celosia floribunda is endemic to the southern and central parts of the peninsula of Baja California in Mexico.
