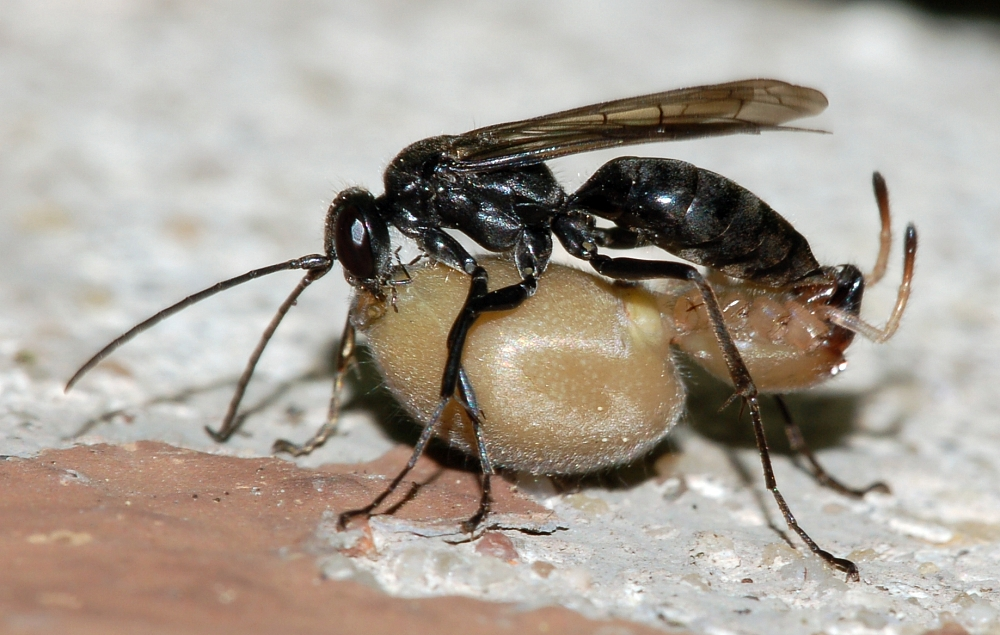

Scientific classification
- Kingdom: Animalia
- Phylum: Arthropoda
- Clade: Pancrustacea
- Class: Insecta
- Order: Hymenoptera
- Family: Pompilidae
- Genus: Auplopus
- Species: A. carbonarius

Binomial name
- Auplopus carbonarius (Scopoli, 1763)

Synonyms
- Pseudagenia carbonaria

= Auplopus carbonarius =

Species of wasp

Auplopus carbonarius is a spider wasp of the family Pompilidae. Uniquely among the British group it constructs a nest of barrel-shaped cells in which spiders are stored and the larvae develop. The British common name is sometimes given as the potter spider wasp or the yellow-faced spider wasp.

== Description ==
Approximately 10 millimetres (0.39 in) (male 8 mm or 0.31 in) in length, the male is distinguished by the ivory-coloured maculae alongside the eyes.

== Biology ==
The flight period in Great Britain is June to August, during which the females construct a nest of barrel-shaped cells in which spiders are stored and the larvae develop. There can be as many as ten cells in a nest and the prey often has its legs amputated to make it easier to carry either by flight or more often by crawling along the ground.

The nesting behaviour is quite complex compared to most other spider wasps and shows the behavioural versatility of the female wasp. The nests are constructed in pre-existing holes in various situations, with reports citing nests beneath stones, in masonry, in tree stumps (often in old beetle burrows), under bark and in crevices of tree trunks, in empty galls of cynipid wasps, in empty burrows of other invertebrates, including other hymenopteran nests. Females create small, barrel-like cells which are laid sideways. These are constructed from small pellets of mud obtained from damp areas of soil and carried to the nest site. Water is also collected separately to aid nest building. Completed nests may consist of ten or more cells arranged in a block. These cells are then stocked with a wide variety of spider species captured from amongst vegetation. One spider is put in each cell. A. carbonarius may occasionally visit flowers such as spurge.

The most frequent prey consists of spiders in the family Clubionidae, but they have also been recorded taking Gnaphosidae, Salticidae, Agelenidae, Thomisidae, Lycosidae, Segestriidae and Anyphaenidae.

== Habitat ==
Woodland, especially that with water courses and marshy areas which provide wet mud and clay for building nests.

== Distribution ==
=== Native ===
South eastern England, central Europe and Scandinavia,

=== Non Native ===
Eastern United States, eastern Canada,
