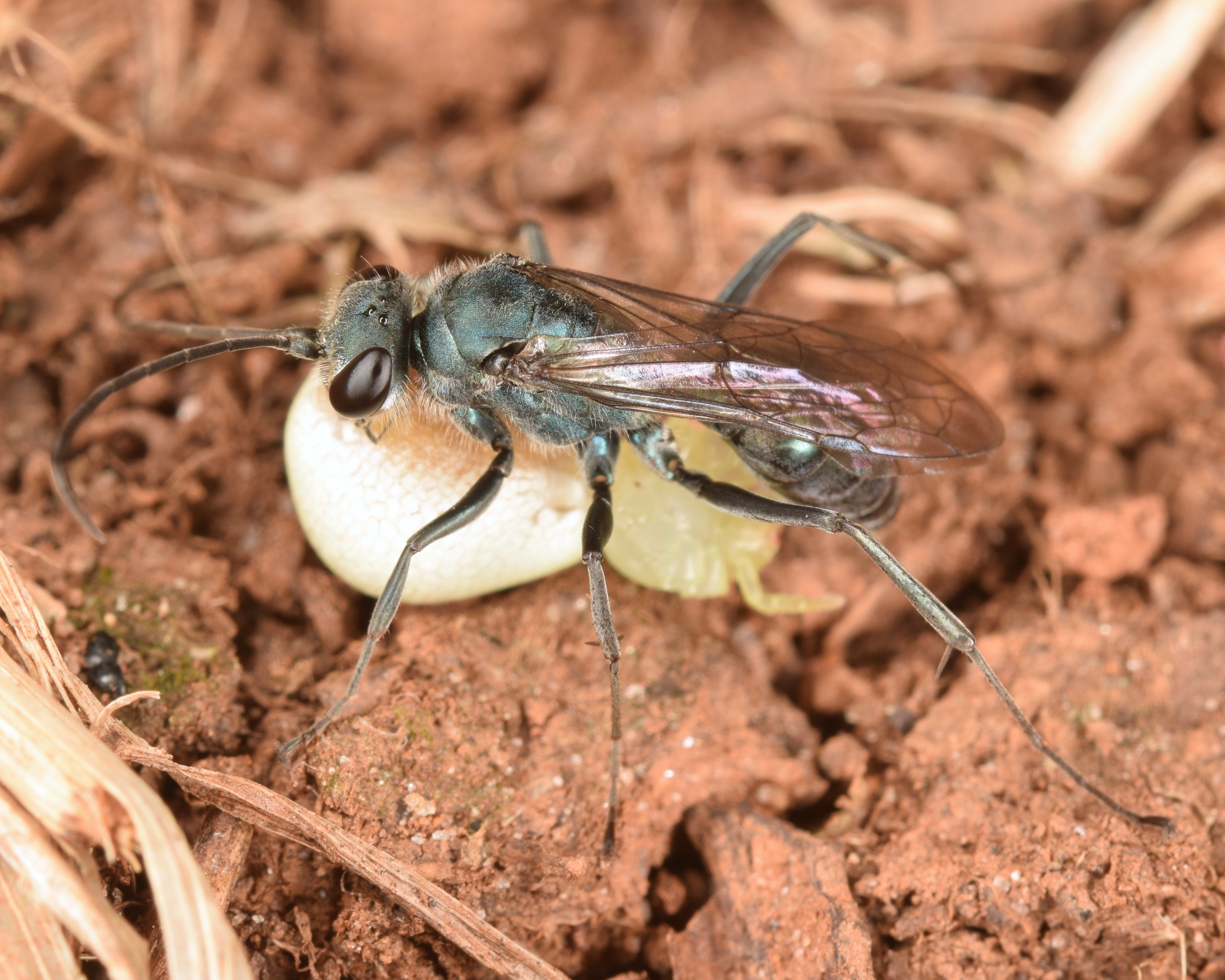

Scientific classification
- Kingdom: Animalia
- Phylum: Arthropoda
- Class: Insecta
- Order: Hymenoptera
- Family: Pompilidae
- Genus: Auplopus
- Species: A. architectus

Binomial name
- Auplopus architectus Say, 1832

= Auplopus architectus =

Species of insect

Auplopus architectus is a species of spider wasp of the family Pompilidae.

== Description ==
Auplopus architectus are small to medium sized wasps, with females as long as 1 1/2 in. The exoskeleton is iridescent, especially within the subspecies A. a. metallicus. The head is black and the wings are usually amber in color.

== Habitat ==
Mostly wooded areas. Found often near old buildings, but in the wild, nests are built in rock crevasses. In civilized areas, they are found near old buildings. Nests are built in cracks of such buildings. They will nest in other cavities, such as at the back of pipes.

== Behavior ==
This species is often nervous (energetic), and always on the lookout for prey. If they get into buildings, they are seen at windows with lots of sun.

== Nests ==
Nests are barrel shaped capsules, made of mud.

== Geographic range ==
Separate populations in California, the Northeastern U.S., and Arkansas.
