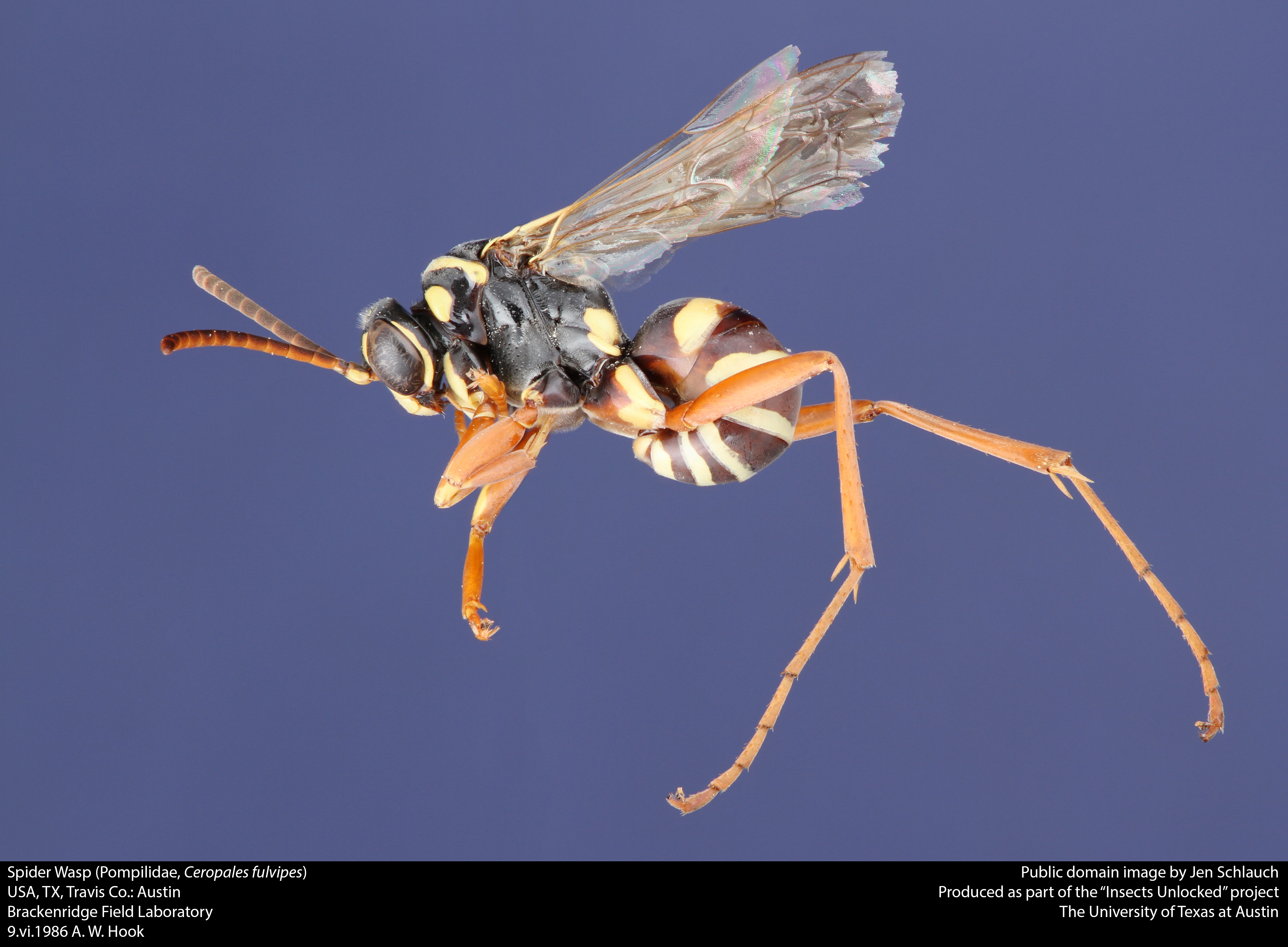
- Ceropales fulvipes

Scientific classification
- Kingdom: Animalia
- Phylum: Arthropoda
- Class: Insecta
- Order: Hymenoptera
- Family: Pompilidae
- Subfamily: Ceropalinae
- Genus: Ceropales; Latreille, 1796

Type species
- Ceropales maculata Fabricius, 1775

= Ceropales =

Genus of wasps

Ceropales is a genus of kleptoparasitic spider wasps from the sub-family Ceropalinae of the family Pompilidae. They are characterised by the taking of the spider prey of other solitary wasps, mainly Pompilidae but members of the Sphecidae that provision with spider prey are sometimes also hosts. In some languages their name translates into English as "cuckoo spider wasp".

== Species ==
Species within Ceropales include

- Ceropales africana Moczar, 1989
- Ceropales albicincta (Rossi, 1790)
- Ceropales bipunctata Say, 1824
- Ceropales brevicornis Patton, 1879
- Ceropales cubensis Cresson, 1865
- Ceropales elegans Cresson, 1872
- Ceropales femoralis Cresson, 1869
- Ceropales fulvipes Cresson, 1872
- Ceropales hatoda Brimley, 1928
- Ceropales karooensis Arnold, 1937
- Ceropales kriechbaumeri Magretti, 1884
- Ceropales latifasciatus Arnold, 1937
- Ceropales ligea Bingham 1903
- Ceropales longipes Smith, 1855
- Ceropales longisulcata Lu & Li, 2019
- Ceropales maculata (Fabricius, 1775)
- Ceropales neomexicana Rohwer, 1915
- Ceropales nigripes Cresson, 1867
- Ceropales pacifica Townes, 1957
- Ceropales pictus Shuck, 1837
- Ceropales punctulatus Cameron, 1904
- Ceropales pygmaeus Kohl, 1879
- Ceropales robni Cresson, 1867
- Ceropales rugata Townes, 1957
- Ceropales scobiniferus Arnold, 1937
- Ceropales variegata (Fabricius, 1798)
- Ceropales variolosus Arnold, 1937
- Ceropales yunnanensis Lu & Li, 2019
