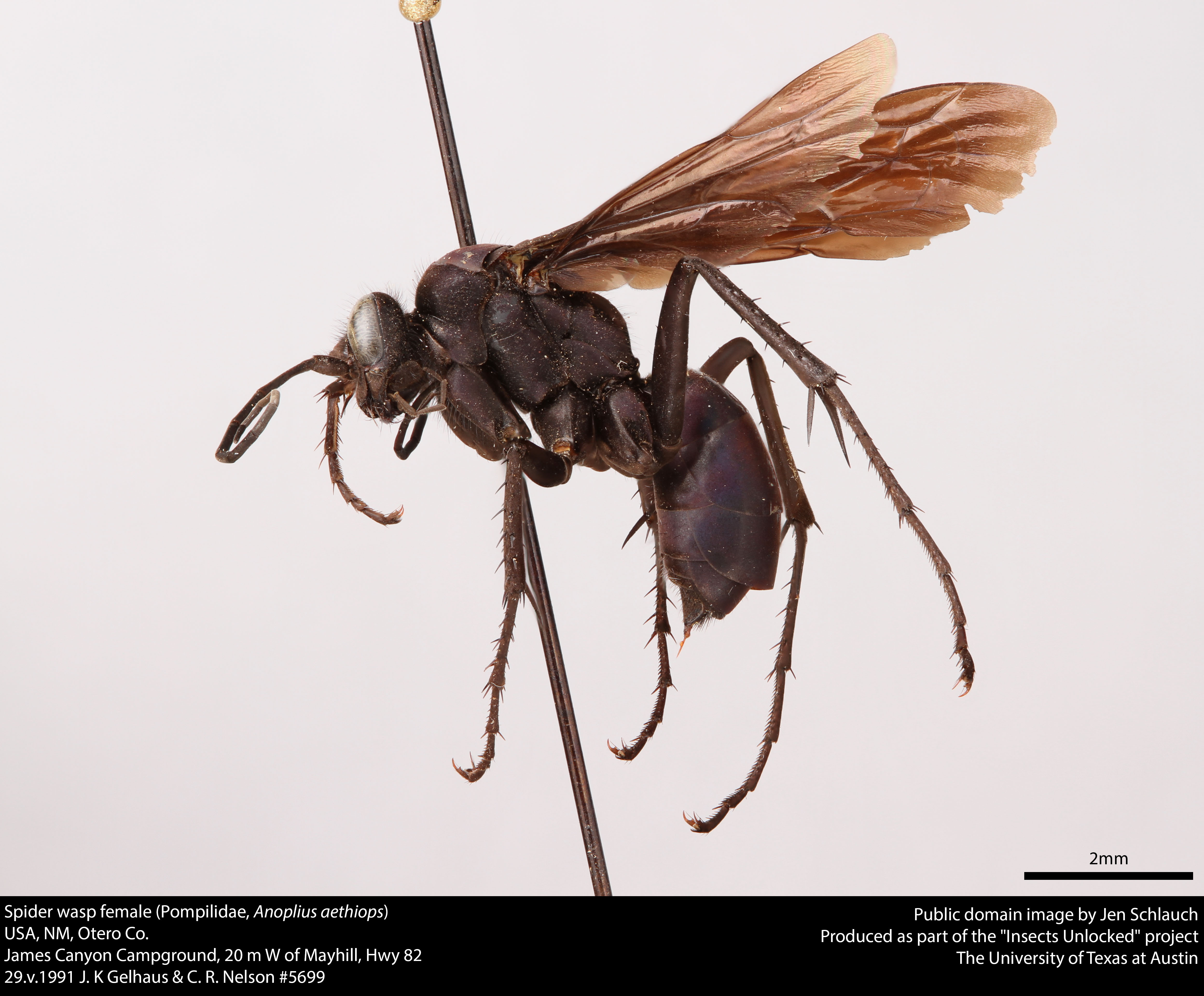
- Female

Scientific classification
- Domain: Eukaryota
- Kingdom: Animalia
- Phylum: Arthropoda
- Class: Insecta
- Order: Hymenoptera
- Family: Pompilidae
- Genus: Anoplius
- Species: A. aethiops

Binomial name
- Anoplius aethiops (Cresson)

= Anoplius aethiops =

Species of wasp

Anoplius aethiops is a species of spider wasp in the family Pompilidae. It primarily lives in overgrown fields with fine-grained soil. It provisions its young with paralyzed Lycosidae spiders, especially those of the genus Hogna.
