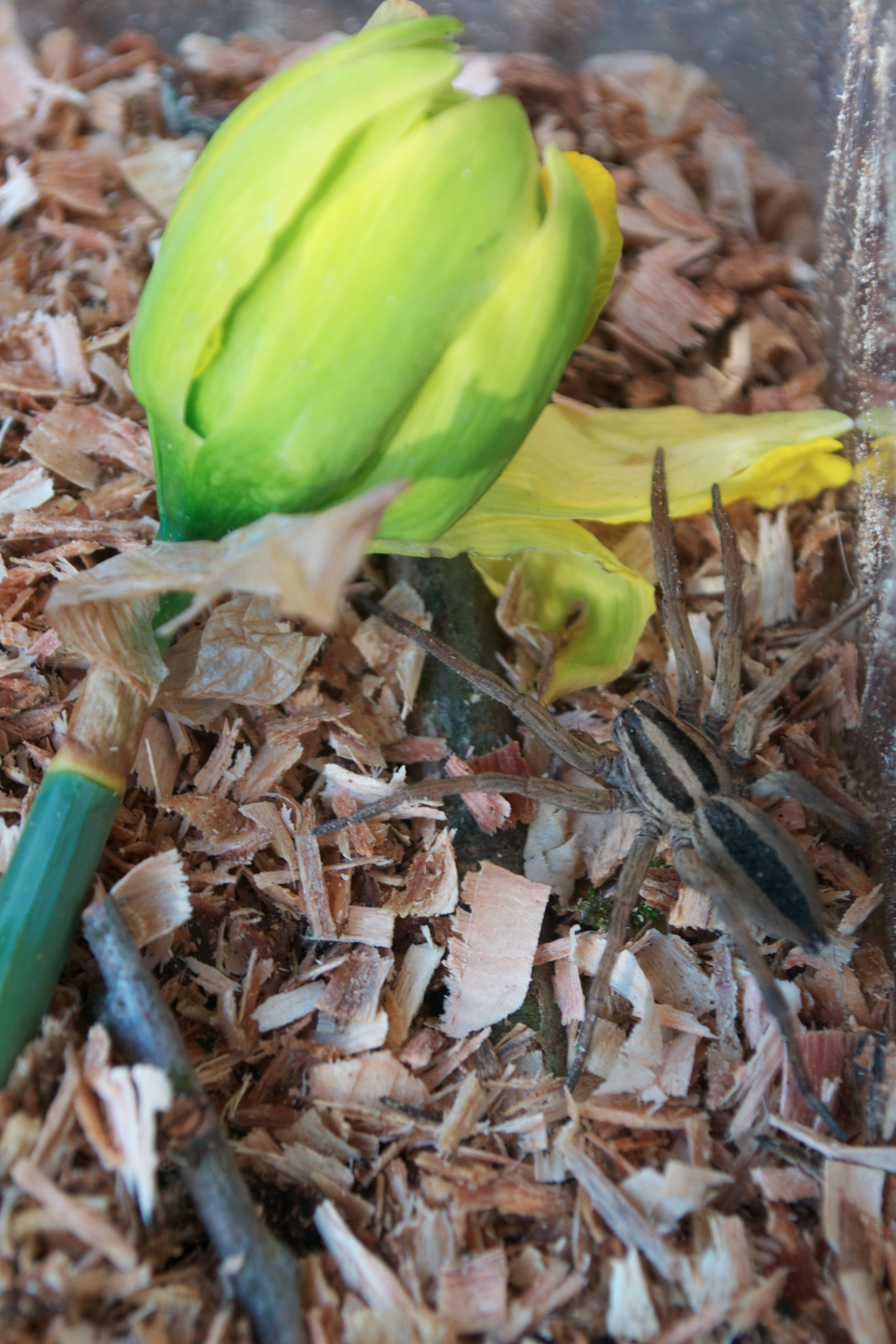
- Female Rabidosa punctulata collected at 36°N 80°W.

Scientific classification
- Kingdom: Animalia
- Phylum: Arthropoda
- Subphylum: Chelicerata
- Class: Arachnida
- Order: Araneae
- Infraorder: Araneomorphae
- Family: Lycosidae
- Genus: Rabidosa
- Species: R. punctulata

Binomial name
- Rabidosa punctulata Hentz, 1844

= Rabidosa punctulata =

Species of spider

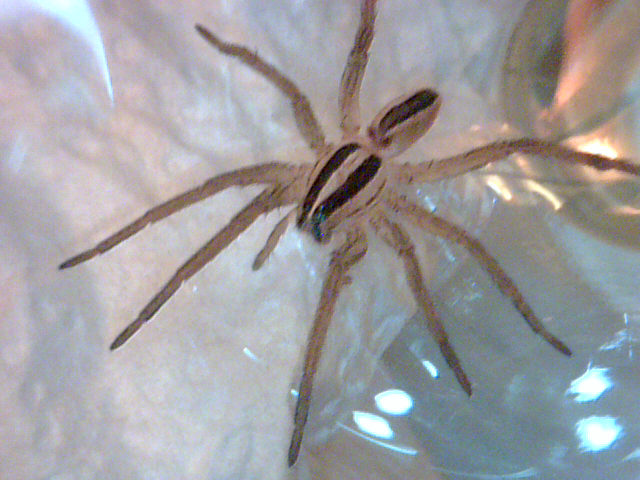
19 millimeter Female photographed at 36°N 80°W.

Rabidosa punctulata, the dotted wolf spider, is a species of spider in the family Lycosidae. It is found in areas of weeds and tall grasses. It is a light-brown and large wolf spider with stripes on the cephalothorax and an abdomen with light spots and a dark middle stripe. Its range spreads from Massachusetts west to Kansas south to Texas and Northern Florida.
