= Rabidosa carrana =

Scientific classification
- Kingdom: Animalia
- Phylum: Arthropoda
- Subphylum: Chelicerata
- Class: Arachnida
- Order: Araneae
- Infraorder: Araneomorphae
- Family: Lycosidae
- Genus: Rabidosa
- Species: R. carrana

Binomial name
- Rabidosa carrana (Bryant, 1934)

Species of spider

Rabidosa carrana is a species of wolf spider in the family Lycosidae. It is found in the United States.
