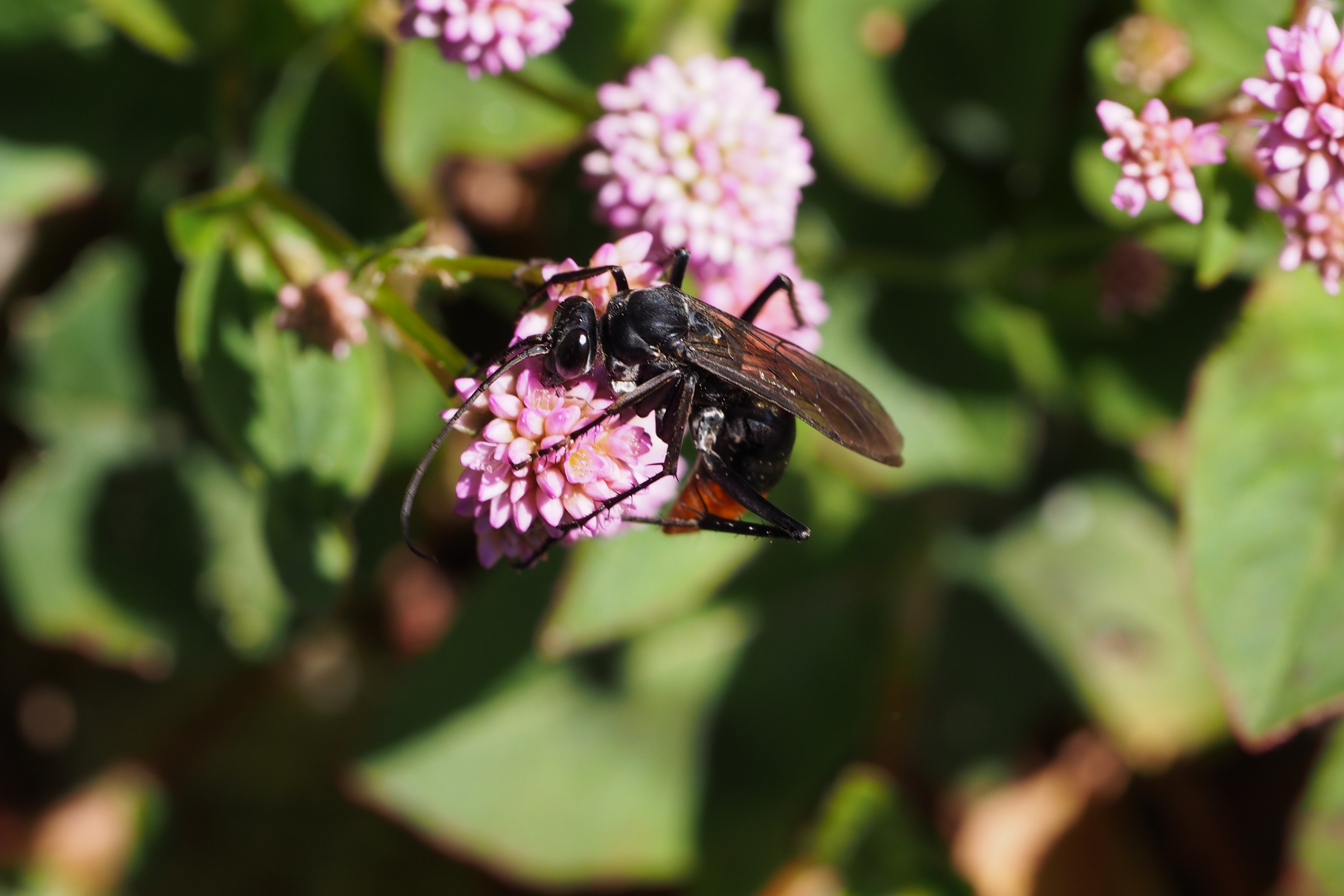

Scientific classification
- Kingdom: Animalia
- Phylum: Arthropoda
- Clade: Pancrustacea
- Class: Insecta
- Order: Hymenoptera
- Family: Pompilidae
- Genus: Tachypompilus
- Species: T. analis

Binomial name
- Tachypompilus analis (Fabricius, 1781)

Synonyms
- Sphex analis Fabricius, 1871; Pompilus analis (Bingham, 1897); Salius pavianus (Saussure 1904)

= Tachypompilus analis =

Species of wasp

Tachypompilus analis, the red-tailed spider wasp is a species of spider wasp found in most of tropical and subtropical Asia, north to Japan. These spider wasps often hunt huntsman spiders.

== Description ==
T. analis is a medium-sized to large wasp with females in mainland China measuring between 16 and 21 mm, while the smaller males measure 11 mm in length; island populations tend to be smaller. It is almost completely black except for the last four, in females, or last five, in males, metasomal segments, which are bright orange or red and give rise to the common name, red-tailed spider wasp.

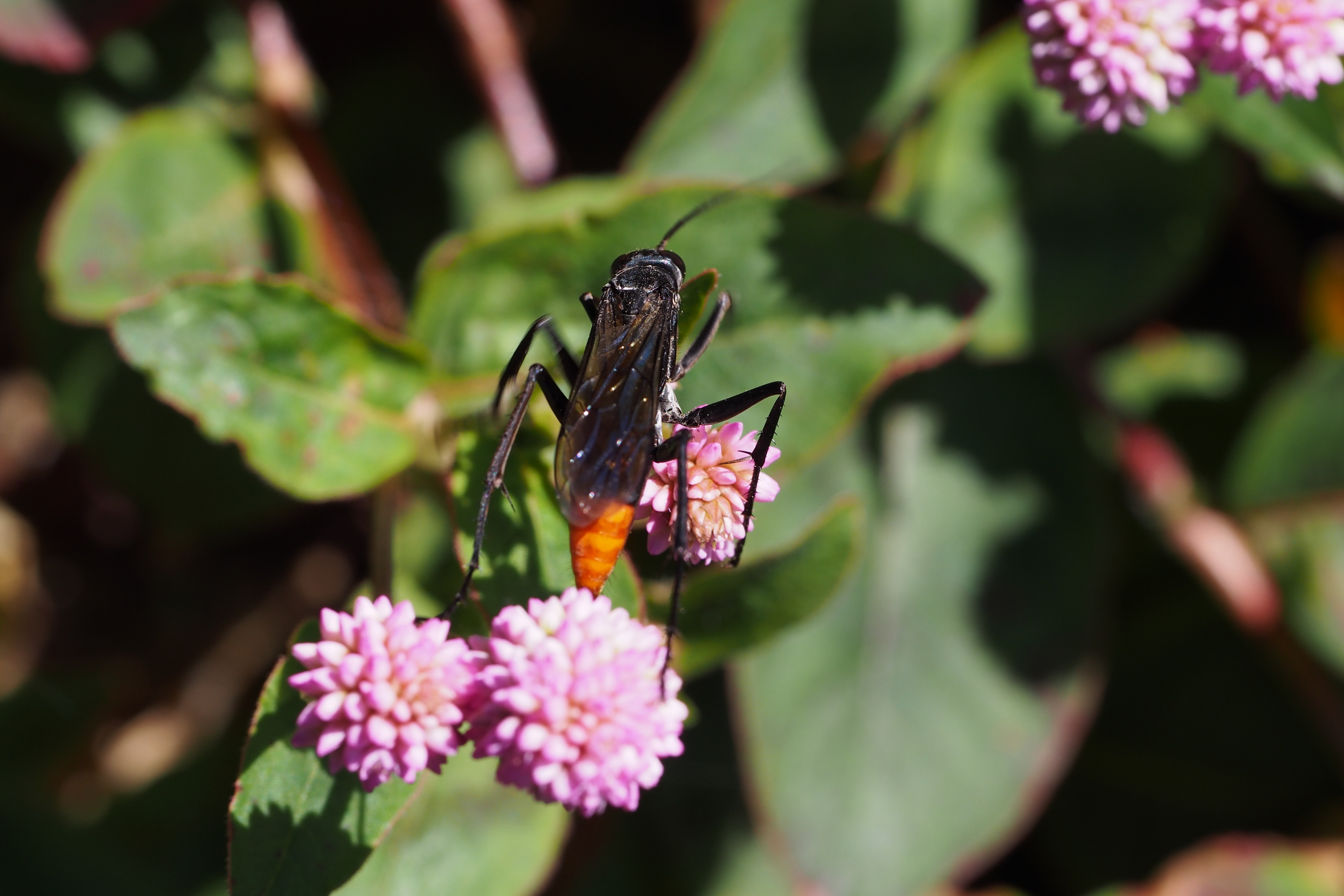

== Biology ==
T. anailis preys on spiders from the families Sparassidae, Agelenidae, and Amaurobiidae. In Japan, Heteropoda venatoria has been recorded being preyed on by this species. The wasp can easily penetrate the most complex webs and the prey is flushed and pursued; the web does provide some protection for the spider, but the wasp persists in attacking until the spider drops out of the web to the ground, where the wasp stings and paralyses the spider. Once captured, the prey is dragged backwards by its pedipalps, sometimes leaving the prey to inspect either the route or the nest at which point the prey could be kleptoparasitised by other females of T. analis, although females will fight to defend their prey in these circumstances. The prey is placed in a conical cavity excavated by the female, which may fold its legs to fit it in, and once oviposition has taken place the spoil is used to cover the nest, although pre-existing cavities may also be used. As in other spider wasps, the males often patrol the nesting areas so that they can mate with the newly emerged females.

Irenangelus luzonensis is recorded as kleptoparasitising T. analis in the Philippines, while other species of Irenangelus are also recorded as kleptoprarasites of T. analis. Tachinid flies are known to attack and consume spiders which have been immobilised by T. analis, and scuttle flies and satellite flies may also consume spiders preyed on by these wasps.

== Distribution ==
T. analis is a widespread species, being found from the Nansei Islands of Japan through Taiwan and the Philippines and across southeast and southern Asia; it is also found in Hawaii.
