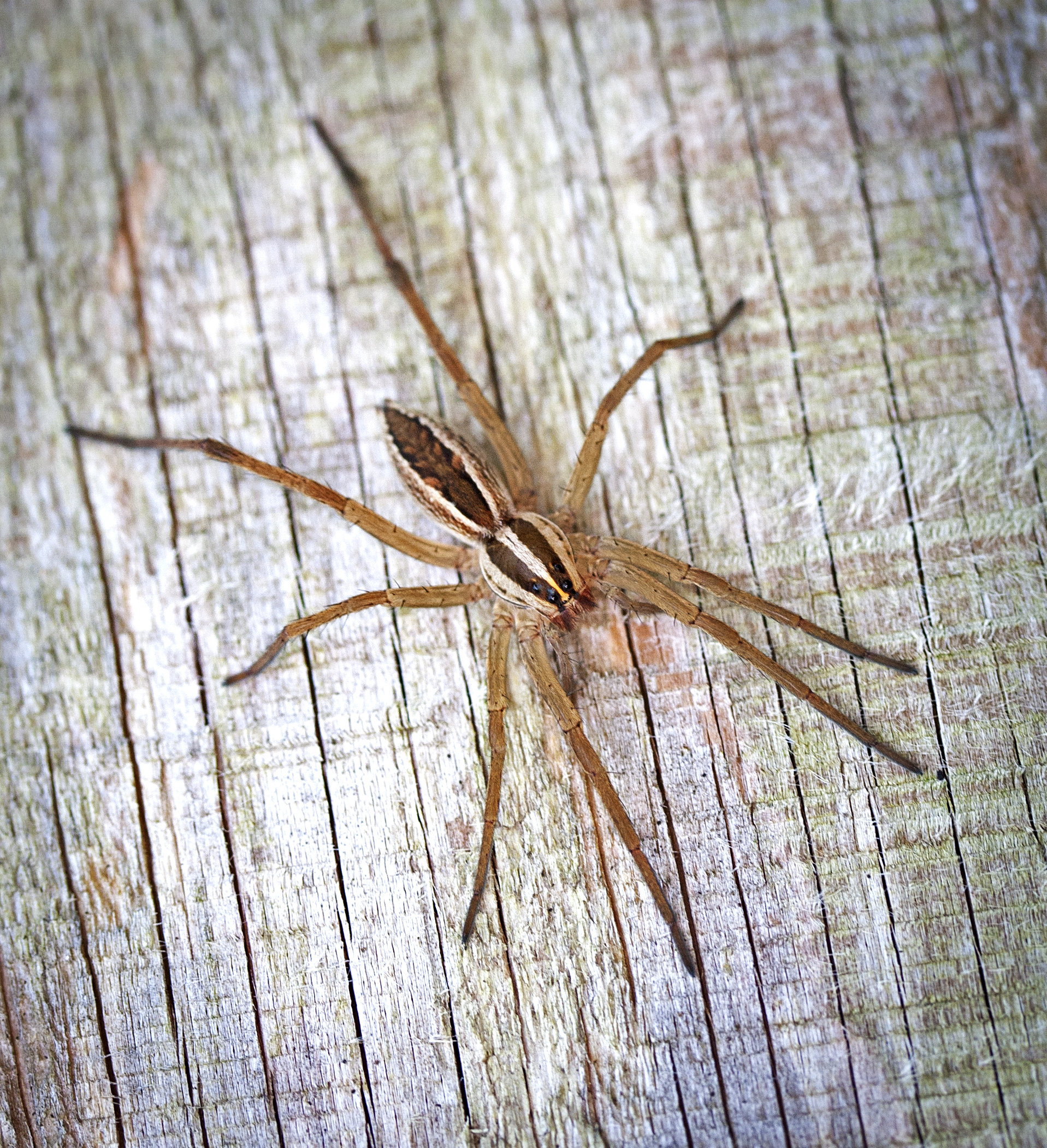

Scientific classification
- Kingdom: Animalia
- Phylum: Arthropoda
- Subphylum: Chelicerata
- Class: Arachnida
- Order: Araneae
- Infraorder: Araneomorphae
- Family: Lycosidae
- Genus: Rabidosa
- Species: R. rabida

Binomial name
- Rabidosa rabida (Walckenaer, 1837)

Synonyms
- Lycosa rabida Walckenaer, 1837; Dolomedes lineatus Walckenaer, 1837; Lycosa scutulata Emerton, 1885; Lycosa scutata Simon, 1898; Hogna rabida (Walckenaer, 1837)

= Rabidosa rabida =

Species of spider

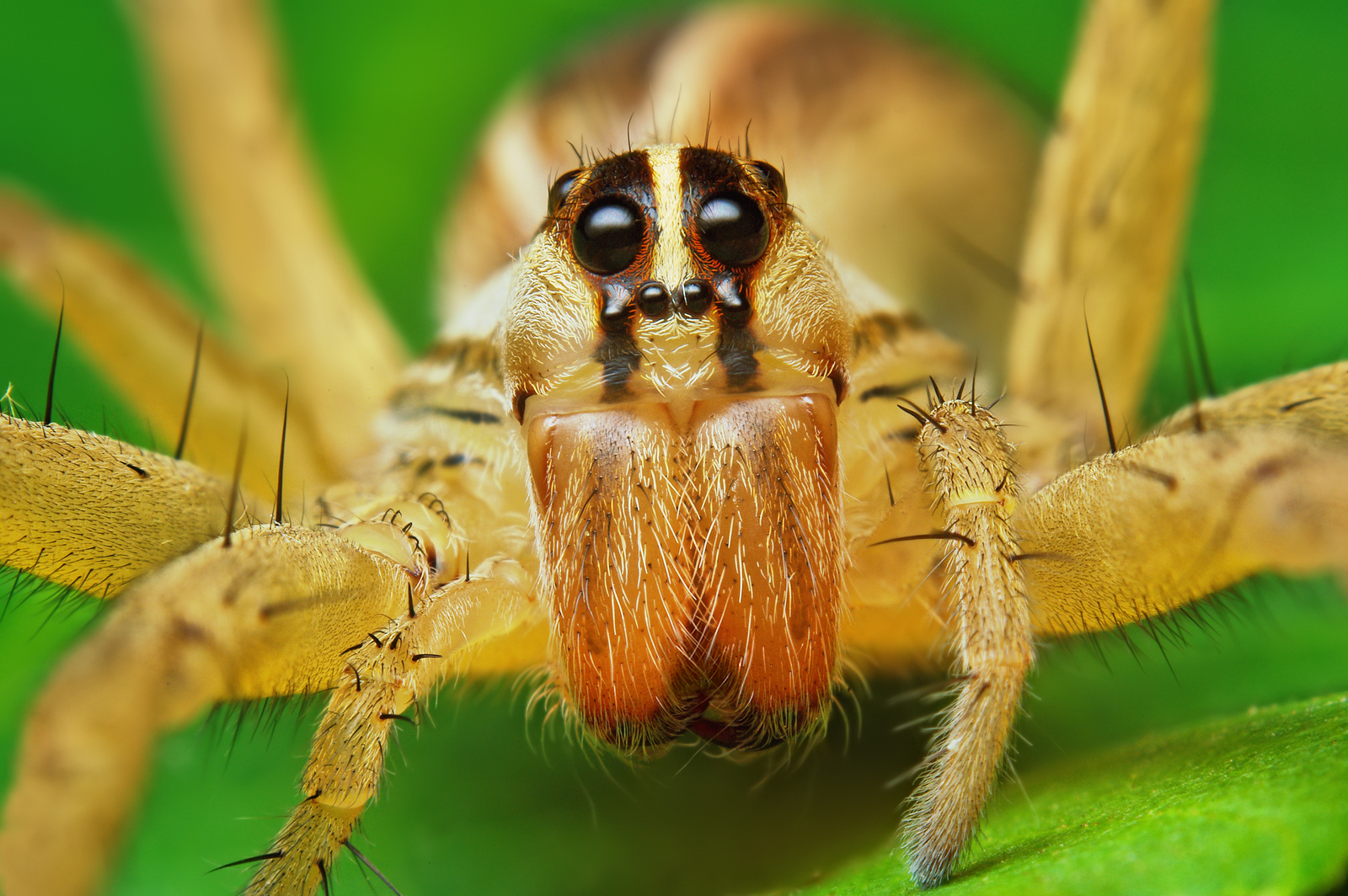
Female

Rabidosa rabida, also known as the rabid wolf spider, is a species of spiders from the family Lycosidae, native to North America. In the United States it is found from Maine to Florida and west to Texas.

== Description ==
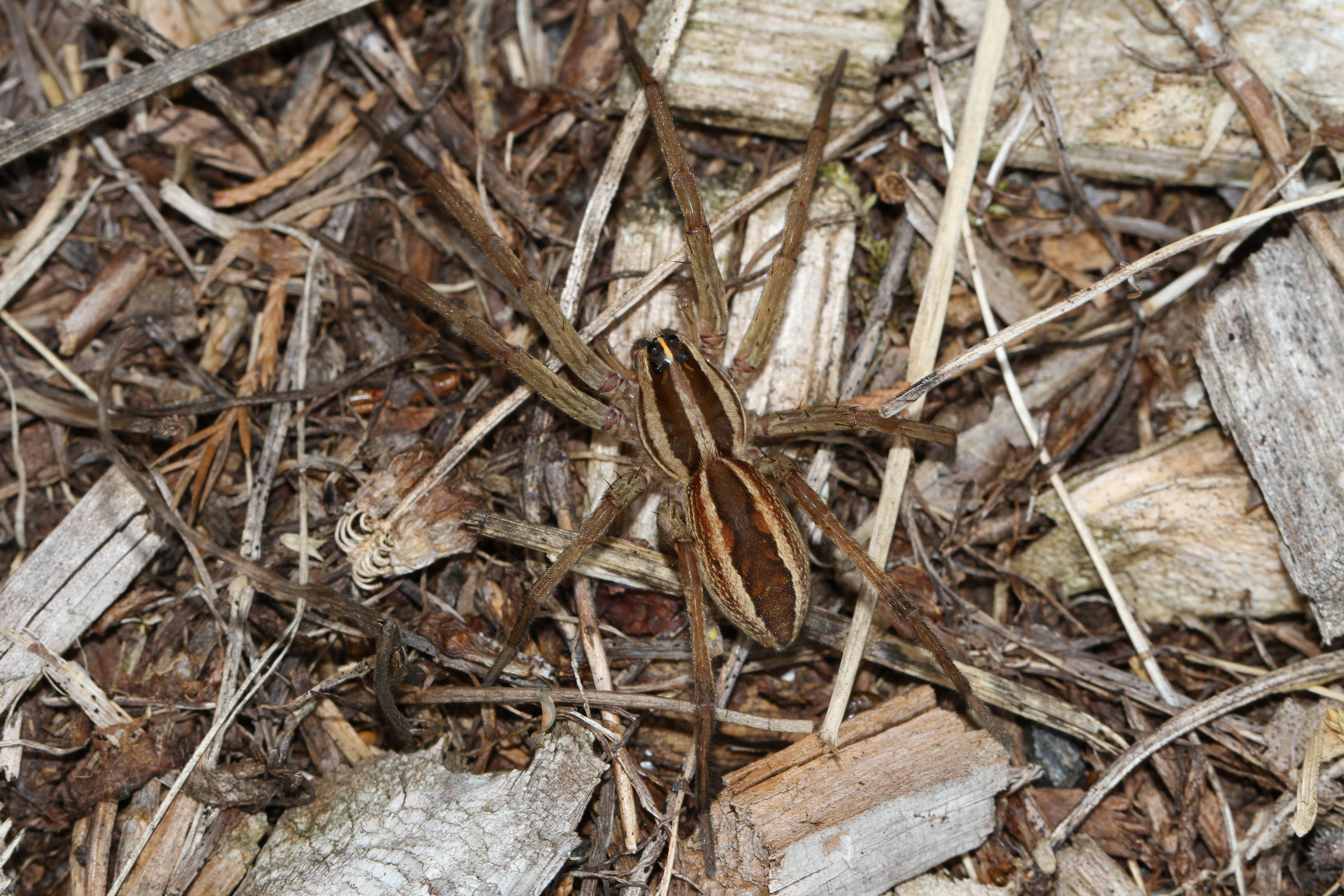
In Nokesville, Virginia

The cephalothorax has two dark stripes. The abdomen has one stripe of the same color. Other parts of the spider are yellow. The females are larger than males, and have a body length of about an inch, while the males' body length is about half an inch. The species has eight eyes: four above, and four below, which look more like a spider's moustache.

B. J. Kaston distinguishes R. rabida from R. punctulata by observing that the males of the former have front legs that are mostly black, whereas the latter have all legs of the same color.

The common namesake "rabid wolf spider" is thought to derive from the erratic, rapid movement of this species. However spiders cannot have rabies and therefore, cannot transmit it to humans or other animals.

== Habitat and ecology ==
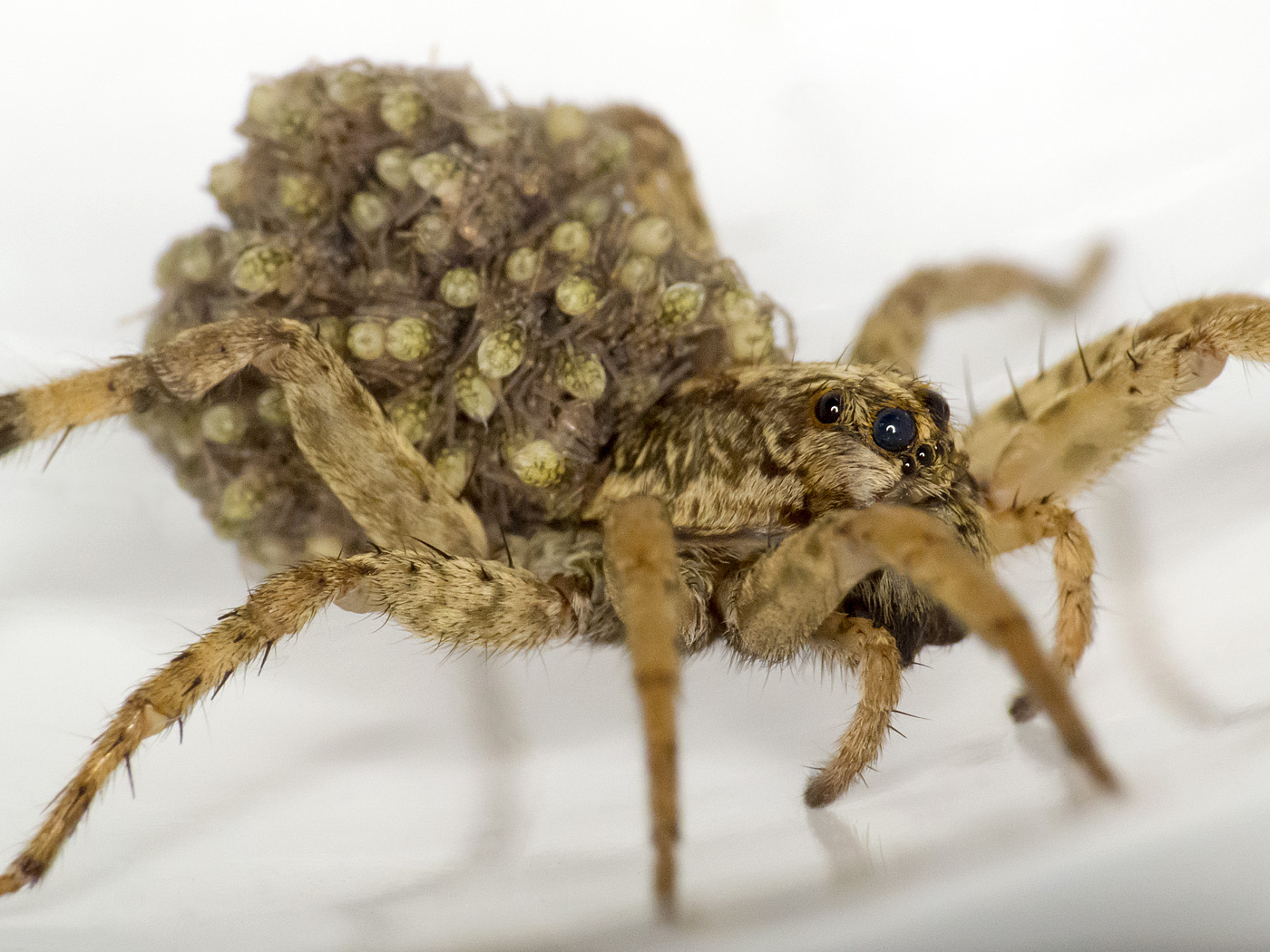
With young on its back in Round Mountain, Texas

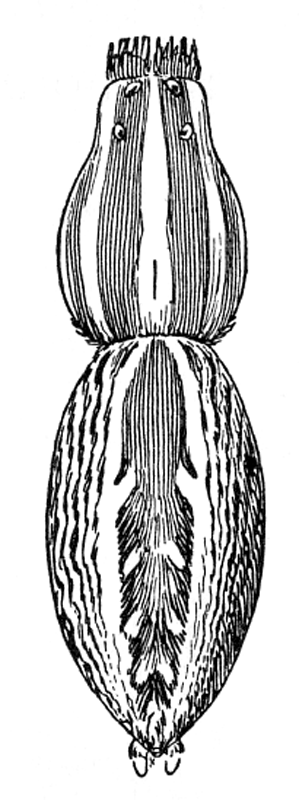
1902 illustration (as Lycosa scutulata)

The species likes cotton fields and wooded areas. They usually live in holes and garbage of various kinds. Sometimes they might be found around ponds or in deep burrows that are covered by debris. This species doesn't build webs to catch prey, instead they weave silk blankets to catch prey or to protect young. When prey enters the perimeter of this silk sheet, this species has been observed detaching anchor points and manipulating the weave to thoroughly ensnare the target. They hunt at night, by ambushing or chasing down prey. Sometimes, in order to catch their prey, they camouflage themselves as bark or leaves. During breeding, the male performs a "dance" in front of the female and makes noise via stridulation. If mating is successful, the female will begin to lay its eggs and build an egg sac out of silk, which she will use to carry her young in. When the spiderlings are born, they ride on the mother's back until they are old enough to be on their own.

Rabid wolf spiders may bite if provoked, but their bite is not dangerous to humans.

== Range ==
The rabid wolf spider is native to North America. In the United States, it is found in the east from Maine down to Florida, and in the west from Oklahoma to Texas.
