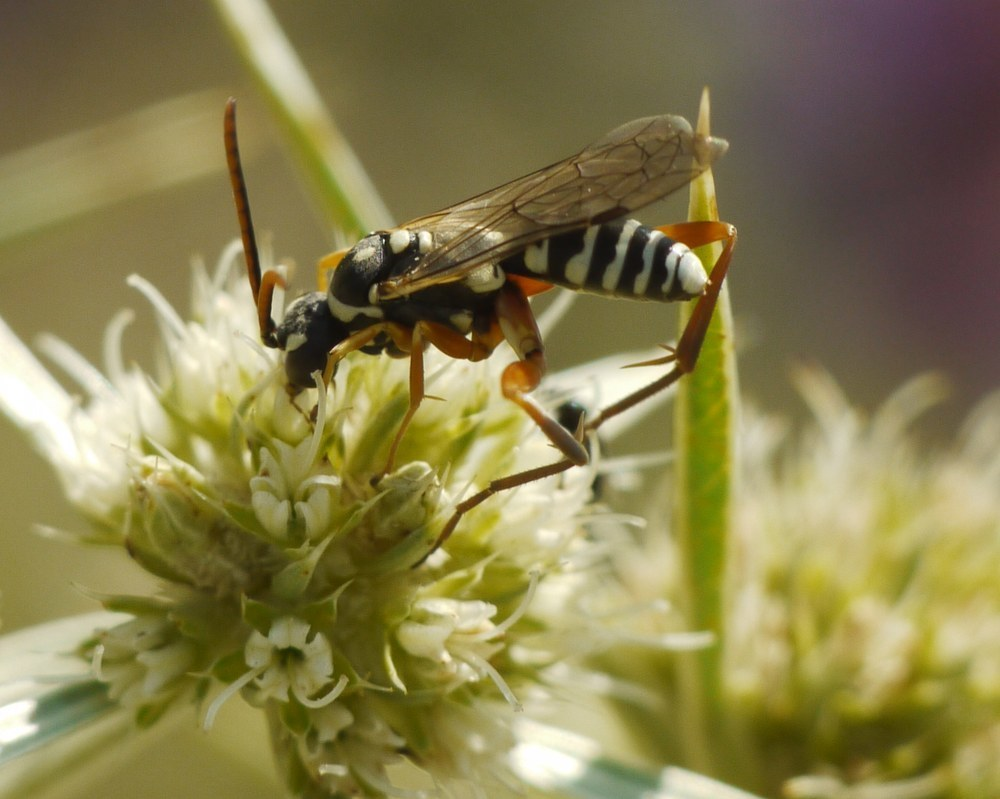
- Ceropales spp

Scientific classification
- Domain: Eukaryota
- Kingdom: Animalia
- Phylum: Arthropoda
- Class: Insecta
- Order: Hymenoptera
- Family: Pompilidae
- Subfamily: Ceropalinae

= Ceropalinae =

Subfamily of wasps

The Ceropalinae are a subfamily of the Pompilidae, the spider wasps, containing two genera, whose members are kleptoparasitic on other solitary wasps which hunt spiders, mainly fellow members of the Pompilidae.

The two genera within the Ceropalinae are

- Ceropales Latreille, 1796
- Irenangelus Schultz 1906
