= Howard Ensign Evans =

American entomologist

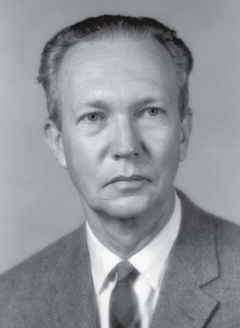
- Howard E. Evans, early 1960s
- Born: February 23, 1919; East Hartford, Connecticut, U.S.
- Died: July 18, 2002 (aged 83)
- Education: University of Connecticut; Cornell University
- Occupation: Entomologist

Howard Ensign Evans (February 23, 1919 – July 18, 2002) was an American entomologist who was a specialist on wasps. He was also the author of several popular works on entomology including Life on a Little-known Planet (1968), The Pleasures of Entomology (1985) and Wasp Farm (1963).

== Early life ==
Born in East Hartford, Connecticut, the son of Archie and Adella (Ensign) Evans, he developed an interest in natural history, and insects in particular, as a child on his parents' tobacco farm. He attended the University of Connecticut, where he studied English. He took an interest in biology after attending classes in entomology by J.A. Manter. His thesis was based on rearing insects from branches broken by a 1938 hurricane. After his graduation he worked at the Connecticut Agricultural Experiment Station in New Haven.

Evans next began work on a Ph.D. at Cornell University, but his studies were interrupted by World War II. He was drafted and chose to serve as an army parasitologist, doing pioneering work on the Giardia parasite while stationed in St. John's, Newfoundland. Giardia had been causing servicemen stationed in the Philippines of a diarrheal illness known as giardiasis. He returned to North Carolina and worked at a base hospital studying parasites in the stools of returning servicemen. He resumed doctoral studies at Cornell with the passage in 1944 of the G.I. Bill that helped WWII veterans and their families to cover costs for college education. He worked on the systematics of the Pompilidae under J. Chester Bradley and V.S.L. Pate. Wasps in the family Pompilidae are commonly called spider wasps, spider-hunting wasps, or pompilid wasps. The family includes some 5,000 species in six subfamilies.

Evans held academic positions at Kansas State University, Cornell University, Harvard University, and Colorado State University. His passions included field biology, writing, teaching, the American West, backpacking, fishing, classical music, environmental conservation, and his family. Howard married Mary Alice, daughter of Mary Alice was the daughter of Cornell entomologist Henry Dietrich, and they had three children.

== Research ==
Numbered among his accomplishments in hymenopteran taxonomy was the novel family Scolebythidae in addition to 31 genera and almost 800 species. In addition to taxonomy, Evans produced important work on insect behavior and evolution. He worked on the behavior and systematics of sand wasps with Carl Yoshimoto and C.S. Lin between 1949 and 1952.

== Honors ==
A fellow at the National Academy of Sciences, Evans received a number of honors, including the William J. Walker Prize of the Boston Museum of Science (1967) and the Daniel Giraud Elliot Medal from the National Academy of Sciences (1976).

== Publications ==
Evans' first book was The Song I Sing (1951) which was a compilation of his poetry. He was short-listed in 1964 for the National Book Award for his non-fiction book Wasp Farm. His work includes 255 scientific papers, 40 popular articles, and 15 books, including Wasp Farm and The Pleasures of Entomology. He coauthored the book Wasps with Mary Jane West-Eberhard. Several of his books, including Life on a Little Known Planet, are among the most popular works on entomology for a general audience and were translated into many languages and reprinted several times. His publications also include works on the history of biology, Australian natural history, and the American West; in addition, he published an entomology textbook and a volume of poetry. Several books were co-authored with his wife, Mary Alice (Dietrich) Evans (1921-2014), including a biography, William Morton Wheeler: Biologist, Australia: a Natural History, and Cache La Poudre: The Natural History of a River. Some of his most noteworthy essays for popular audiences were published posthumously as The Man Who Loved Wasps: A Howard Ensign Evans Reader. Also published posthumously was The Sand Wasps: Natural History and Behavior, completed by Kevin M. O'Neill from notes left by Evans. Evans maintained an interest in poetry and wrote The Song I Sing (1951) which included a collection of poems that had he had published in Hartford newspapers.
