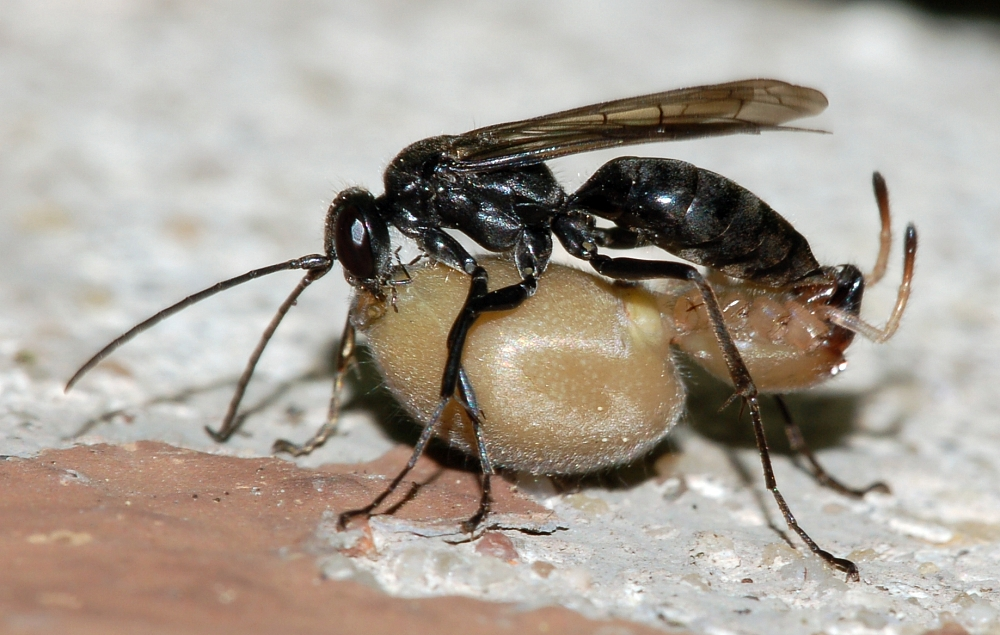
- Auplopus carbonarius with prey

Scientific classification
- Domain: Eukaryota
- Kingdom: Animalia
- Phylum: Arthropoda
- Class: Insecta
- Order: Hymenoptera
- Superfamily: Pompiloidea
- Family: Pompilidae
- Subfamily: Pepsinae
- Genus: Auplopus; Spinola, 1841

Type species
- Pompilus femoratus Fabricius, 1805

Synonyms
- Pseudagenia Kohl, 1884; Fabriogenia Banks, 1941

= Auplopus =

Genus of wasps

Auplopus is a large genus of spider wasps belonging to the subfamily Pepsinae of the spider wasp family Pompilidae, distributed throughout the world except for Antarctica. Auplopus wasps amputate the legs of their spider prey before transporting it to the nest.

== Species ==
Species within Auplopus include

- Auplopus adjunctus (Banks, 1911)
- Auplopus aeginus (Smith, 1857)
- Auplopus albifrons (Dalman, 1823)
- Auplopus alaris (Saussure, 1867)
- Auplopus alishanus Ishikawa, 1967
- Auplopus amazonus Wahis, 2006
- Auplopus appendiculatus (Gussakovskij, 1932)
- Auplopus arcuaticornis Wahis, 2006
- Auplopus architectus (Say, 1836)
- Auplopus artemis (Bingham, 1896)
- Auplopus bakeri (Banks, 1934)
- Auplopus banoensis (Rohwer, 1919)
- Auplopus banosensis Tsuneki 1988
- Auplopus bimaculatus (Smith, 1859)
- Auplopus bipennis (Saussure, 1867)
- Auplopus blandus (Guerin. 1830)
- Auplopus caerulescens (Dahlbom, 1843)
- Auplopus camilla (Turner, 1910)
- Auplopus canberra (Evans, 1972)
- Auplopus capella (Williams, 1920)
- auplopus celaeno (Smith, 1857)
- Auplopus carbonarius (Scopoli, 1763)
- Auplopus carinatus Tsuneki, 1988
- Auplopus cebuensis Tsuneki, 1988
- Auplopus celaeno (Smith, 1857)
- Auplopus chiponensis (Yasumatsu, 1939)
- Auplopus chrysosoma (Rohwer, 1910)
- Auplopus chusanensis (Haupt, 1938)
- Auplopus clypeatus Dreisbach, 1963
- Auplopus commendabilis (Kohl, 1894)
- Auplopus consociata (Turner, 1910)
- Auplopus constructor (Smith, 1873)
- Auplopus cyanellus Wahis, 1992
- Auplopus deceptrix (Smith, 1873)
- Auplopus dilga (Evans, 1972)
- Auplopus domesticus (Taschenberg, 1872)
- Auplopus dreisbachi Wahis, 1986
- Auplopus enodans (Kohl, 1894)
- Auplopus erythropus (Brethes, 1910)
- Auplopus esaki (Yasumatsu, 1939)
- Auplopus esmerelda (Banks, 1925)
- Auplopus eucharis Wahis, 1992
- Auplopus fasciatus (Fabricius, 1775)
- Auplopus femoralis (Arnold, 1934)
- Auplopus femoratus (Fabricius, 1805)
- Auplopus formosanus (Yasumatsu, 1939)
- Auplopus funerator Wahis, 1992
- Auplopus fusiformis (Saussure, 1867)
- Auplopus gnoma (Cameron, 1902)
- Auplopus himalayensis (Cameron, 1905)
- Auplopus hombukeanus Tsuneki, 1989
- Auplopus hoorai Tsuneki, 1989
- Auplopus hypsipyla (Bingham, 1893)
- Auplopus ichnusus Wolf, 1960
- Auplopus imitabilis Wahis, 1992
- Auplopus inermis Townes, 1957
- Auplopus kinabalensis Tsuneki, 1988
- Auplopus krombeini Wahis, 1992
- Auplopus kuanghuanus Tsuneki, 1989
- Auplopus kuarensis Tsuneki, 1989
- Auplopus kyotensis （Yasumatsu, 1939）
- Auplopus laeviculus (Bingham, 1897)
- Auplopus lankaensis Wahis, 1992
- Auplopus macromeroides (Williams, 1919)
- Auplopus makilingi (Williams, 1919)
- Auplopus mandshuricus Lelej, 1990
- Auplopus maroccanus Priesner, 1967
- Auplopus mazoensis (Arnold, 1934)
- Auplopus mellipes (Say, 1836)
- Auplopus micromegas (Saussure, 1867)
- Auplopus militaris (Lynch-Arribalzaga, 1873)
- Auplopus mindanaoensis Tsuneki, 1988
- Auplopus montanus Alayo, 1974
- Auplopus murotai Tsuneki, 1989
- Auplopus mutabilis (Smith, 1870)
- Auplopus nabori Alayo, 1974
- Auplopus nambui Tsuneki, 1989
- Auplopus nantaror Tsuneki, 1988
- Auplopus nigrellus (Banks, 1912)
- Auplopus nigrescens Tsuneki, 1988
- Auplopus nitidiventris (Smith, 1860)
- Auplopus nozakae Tsuneki, 1990
- Auplopus nyemitawa ((Rohwer, 1919)
- Auplopus obtusus (Perez, 1905)
- Auplopus ochraceus (Haupt, 1938)
- Auplopus okawa (Rohwer, 1919)
- Auplopus optabilis Wahis, 2008
- Auplopus pacificus Lelej, 1990
- Auplopus pempuchiensis Tsuneki, 1989
- Auplopus persephone (Banks, 1934)
- Auplopus personatus (Gribodo, 1879)
- Auplopus pygialis (Perez, 1905)
- Auplopus pumilio (Arnold, 1934)
- Auplopus rectus (Haupt, 1926)
- Auplopus rossi (Bingham, 1902)
- Auplopus rufocinctus (Smith, 1855)
- Auplopus semialatus (Williams, 1919)
- Auplopus smithi (Dalla Torre, 1897)
- Auplopus taino Snelling & Torres, 2004
- Auplopus takachihoi Yasumatsu, 1943
- Auplopus thailandinus Tsuneki, 1988
- Auplopus tibialis Lepeletier, 1845
- Auplopus timidus (Smith, 1873)
- Auplopus tinctus (Smith, 1855)
- Auplopus tsunekii Wahis, 1992
- Auplopus unifasciatus (Ashmead, 1904)
- Auplopus vitripennis (Smith, 1855)
- Auplopus viridicans Wahis, 2003
- Auplopus williamsi (Rohwer, 1919)
- Auplopus yaeyamaensis Shimizu, 1986
- Auplopus yasumatsui Lelei, 1995
- Auplopus zulu Dalla Torre, 1897
