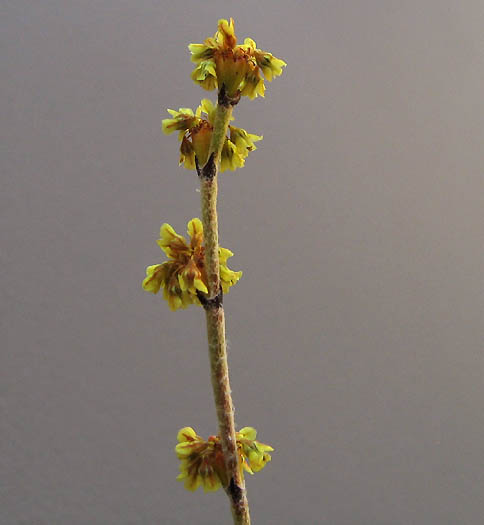

Conservation status
- Apparently Secure (NatureServe)

Scientific classification
- Kingdom: Plantae
- Clade: Embryophytes
- Clade: Tracheophytes
- Clade: Angiosperms
- Clade: Eudicots
- Order: Caryophyllales
- Family: Polygonaceae
- Genus: Eriogonum
- Species: E. gracile

Binomial name
- Eriogonum gracile Benth.

Varieties
- E. g. var. gracile; E. g. var. incultum

Synonyms
- Eriogonum acetoselloides; Eriogonum leucocladum

= Eriogonum gracile =

Species of wild buckwheat

Eriogonum gracile is a species of wild buckwheat known by the common name slender woolly buckwheat.

== Description ==
Eriogonum gracile is an annual herb which is quite variable in appearance. It grows erect to decumbent with a slender, branching stem 10 to 70 centimeters long, sometimes with a thick coat of woolly fibers and sometimes nearly hairless.

The oblong leaves are borne on short petioles, the largest at the base of the plant with blades approaching 6 centimeters long. There are usually leaves along the lower part of the stem. The leaves are woolly in texture, at least on the undersides.

The flowering stem is lined with small clusters of hairless flowers in shades of pink, yellow, or white.

== Taxonomy ==
Eriogonum gracile is a plant in the Eriogonum genus, which is classified in the Polygonaceae family. It was scientifically described in 1844 by George Bentham and has two accepted varieties.

- Eriogonum gracile var. gracile – Native to California and Baja California
- Eriogonum gracile var. incultum – Native to California and Baja California

Eriogonum gracile has eight synonyms of the species or one of its two varieties.

Table of Synonyms
Name	Year	Rank	Synonym of:	Notes
Eriogonum acetoselloides Torr. ex Benth.	1856	species	var. gracile	= het.
Eriogonum gracile var. acetoselloides (Torr. ex Benth.) Torr. & A.Gray	1870	variety	var. gracile	= het.
Eriogonum gracile var. effusum Torr. & A.Gray	1870	variety	var. gracile	= het.
Eriogonum gracile var. leucocladon (Benth.) Torr. & A.Gray	1870	variety	var. gracile	= het.
Eriogonum leucocladon Benth.	1857	species	var. gracile	= het.
Eriogonum leucocladum Gand.	1906	species	var. incultum	= het.
Eriogonum roseum var. leucocladon (Benth.) Hoover	1966	variety	var. gracile	= het.
Eriogonum vimineum subsp. gracile (Benth.) S.Stokes	1936	subspecies	E. gracile	≡ hom.
Notes: ≡ homotypic synonym; = heterotypic synonym

== Distribution ==
The annual plant is native to California, where it is widespread across the state except the deserts, and to parts of Baja California in northwestern Mexico.

It grows in many types of habitat, including chaparral, montane, woodland, and grasslands. It is often found on clay soils, and also in sandy places.
