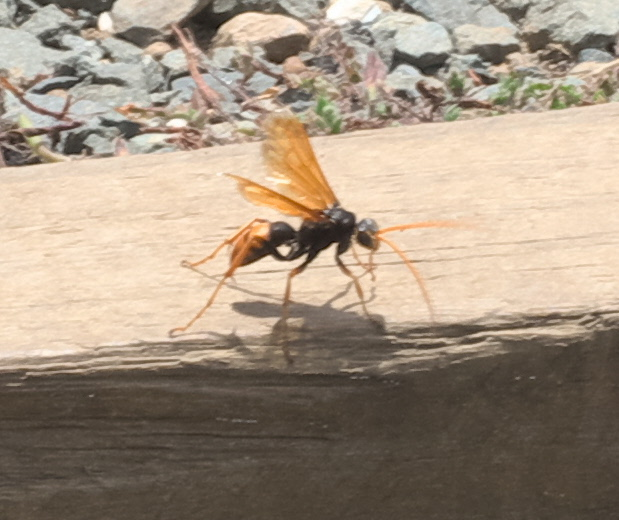
- Cryptocheilus australis

Scientific classification
- Kingdom: Animalia
- Phylum: Arthropoda
- Class: Insecta
- Order: Hymenoptera
- Family: Pompilidae
- Subfamily: Pepsinae
- Tribe: Pepsini; Schust

= Pepsini =

Tribe of wasps

Pepsini is a tribe of spider wasps in the family Pompilidae.

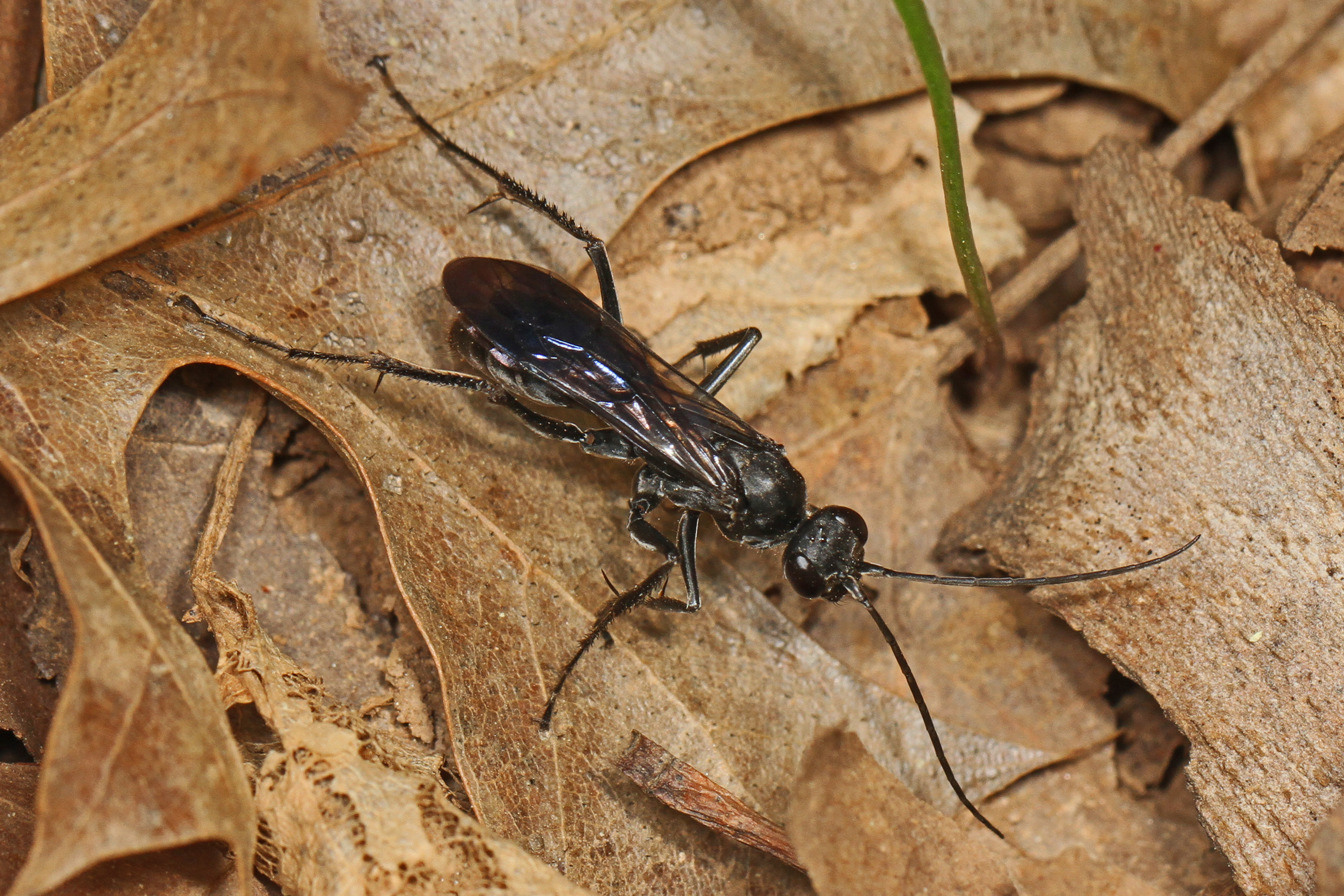
Priocnemis minorata

== Genera ==
- Abernessia Arlé, 1947
- Adirostes Banks, 1946
- Aimatocare Roig-Alsina, 1989
- Allaporus Banks, 1933
- Alococurgus Haupt, 1937
- Anacyphonyx Banks, 1946
- Austrosalius Turner, 1917
- Calopompilus Ashmead, 1900
- Chirodamus Haliday, 1837
- Chrysagenia Haupt, 1941
- Cordyloscelis Arnold, 1935
- Cryptocheilus Panzer, 1806
- Cyphononyx Dahlbom, 1845
- Dentagenia Haupt, 1933
- Derochorses Banks, 1941
- Dinosalius Banks, 1934
- Diplonyx de Saussure, 1887
- Dolichocurgus Haupt, 1937
- Entypus Dahlbom, 1843
- Epipompilus Kohl, 1884
- Eremocurgus Haupt, 1937
- Formosacesa Koçak et Kemal, 2008
- Hemipepsis Dahlbom, 1844
- Herbstellus Wahis, 2002
- Heterodontonyx Haupt, 1935
- Hormopogonius Arnold,1934
- Hypoferreola Ashmead, 1902
- Iridomimus Evans, 1970
- Java Pate, 1946
- Lepidocnemis Haupt, 1930
- Leptodialepis Haupt, 1929
- Melanagenia Wahis, 2009
- Micragenia Haupt, 1926
- Microcurgus Haupt, 1937
- Minagenia Banks, 1934
- Mygnimia Shuckard, 1840
- Ochragenia Haupt, 1959
- Pachycurgus Haupt, 1937
- Paraclavelia Haupt, 1930
- Pepsis Fabricius, 1804
- Plagicurgus Roig-Alsina, 1982
- Pompilocalus Roig-Alsina, 1989
- Poecilocurgus Haupt, 1937
- Pompilocalus Roig-Alsina, 1989
- Schistompilus Tsuneki,1988
- Schistonyx Saussure, 1887
- Trachyglyptus Arnold, 1934
- Xenocurgus Haupt, 1937

=== Genera transferred to Deuterageniini ===
7 genera formerly treated under Pepsini have been transferred to a separate tribe, Deuterageniini.

- Deuteragenia Šustera, 1912
- Dipogon Fox 1897
- Kuriloagenia Loktionov & Lelej, 2014
- Myrmecodipogon Ishikawa, 1965
- Nipponodipogon Ishikawa, 1965
- Stigmatodipogon Ishikawa, 1965
- Winnemanella Krombein, 1962

=== Genera transferred to Priocnemini ===
11 additional genera formerly treated under Pepsini have been transferred to a separate tribe, Priocnemini.

- Caliadurgus Pate, 1946
- Claveliocnemis Wolf, 1968
- Clistoderes Banks, 1934
- Ctenopriocnemis Ishikawa, 1962
- Eopompilus Gussakovskij, 1932
- Eopriocnemis Loktionov & Lelej, 2019
- Malloscelis Haupt, 1935
- Priocnemis Schiødte, 1837
- Priocnessus Banks, 1925
- Sphictostethus Kohl, 1884
