= Phanagenia =

Scientific classification
- Domain: Eukaryota
- Kingdom: Animalia
- Phylum: Arthropoda
- Class: Insecta
- Order: Hymenoptera
- Family: Pompilidae
- Subfamily: Pepsinae
- Tribe: Ageniellini
- Genus: Phanagenia; Banks, 1933

Genus of spider wasp

Phanagenia is a genus of spider wasp in the tribe Ageniellini, a member of the family Pompilidae. The genus has only one species in North America, Phanagenia bombycina.

== Description ==
Wasps in the genus Phanagenia are small, thin, and wiry. Adults range from 5 mm to 15 mm. Most are black, including Phanagenia bombycina, with iridescent black wings.

== Habitat ==
Woodlands and woodland edges, where adults rarely visit flowers.

== Nest ==
Nests and nest provisions are similar to those of other Ageniellini, such as Auplopus, Ageniella, and Eragenia.
