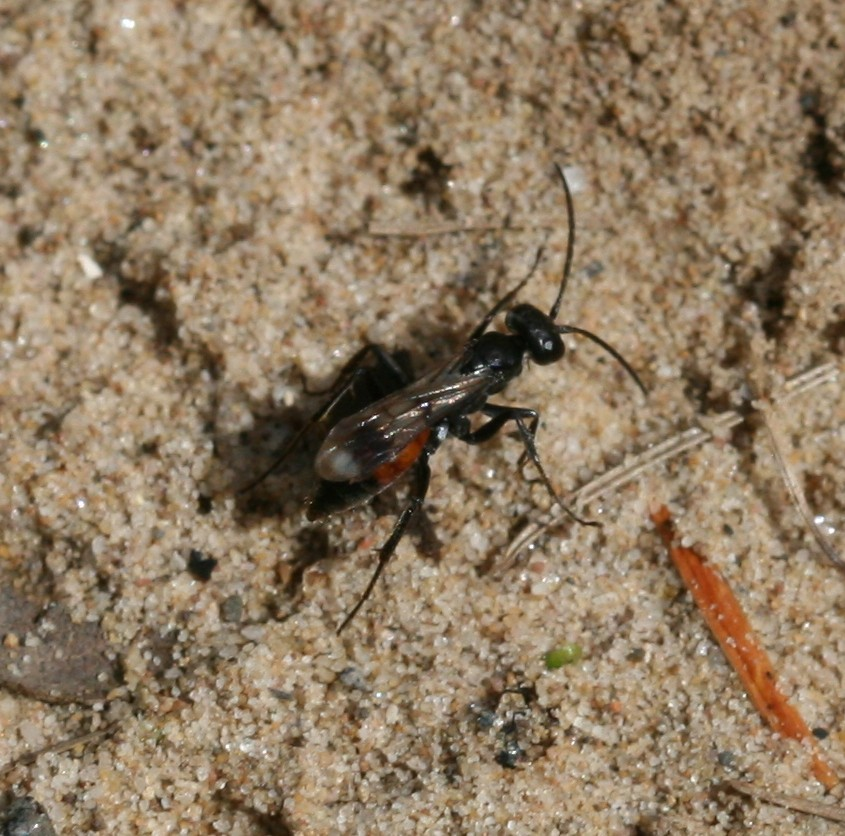

Scientific classification
- Kingdom: Animalia
- Phylum: Arthropoda
- Clade: Pancrustacea
- Class: Insecta
- Order: Hymenoptera
- Family: Pompilidae
- Subfamily: Pepsinae
- Genus: Caliadurgus
- Species: C. fasciatellus

Binomial name
- Caliadurgus fasciatellus (Spinola, 1808)

Synonyms
- Pompilus fasciatellus Spinola, 1808; Pompilus calcaratus Dahlbom, 1829; Pompilus maculipennis Dahlbom, 1829; Pompilus albispinus Herrich-Schäffer, 1830; Pompilus curtus Zetterstedt, 1838; Priocnemis gyllenhali Dahlbom, 1843; Anoplius labiatus Lepeletier, 1845; Calicurgus odontellus Lepeletier, 1845; Pompilus bivirgulatus Costa, 1881; Priocnemis fuscopennis Verhoeff, 1892

= Caliadurgus fasciatellus =

Species of wasp

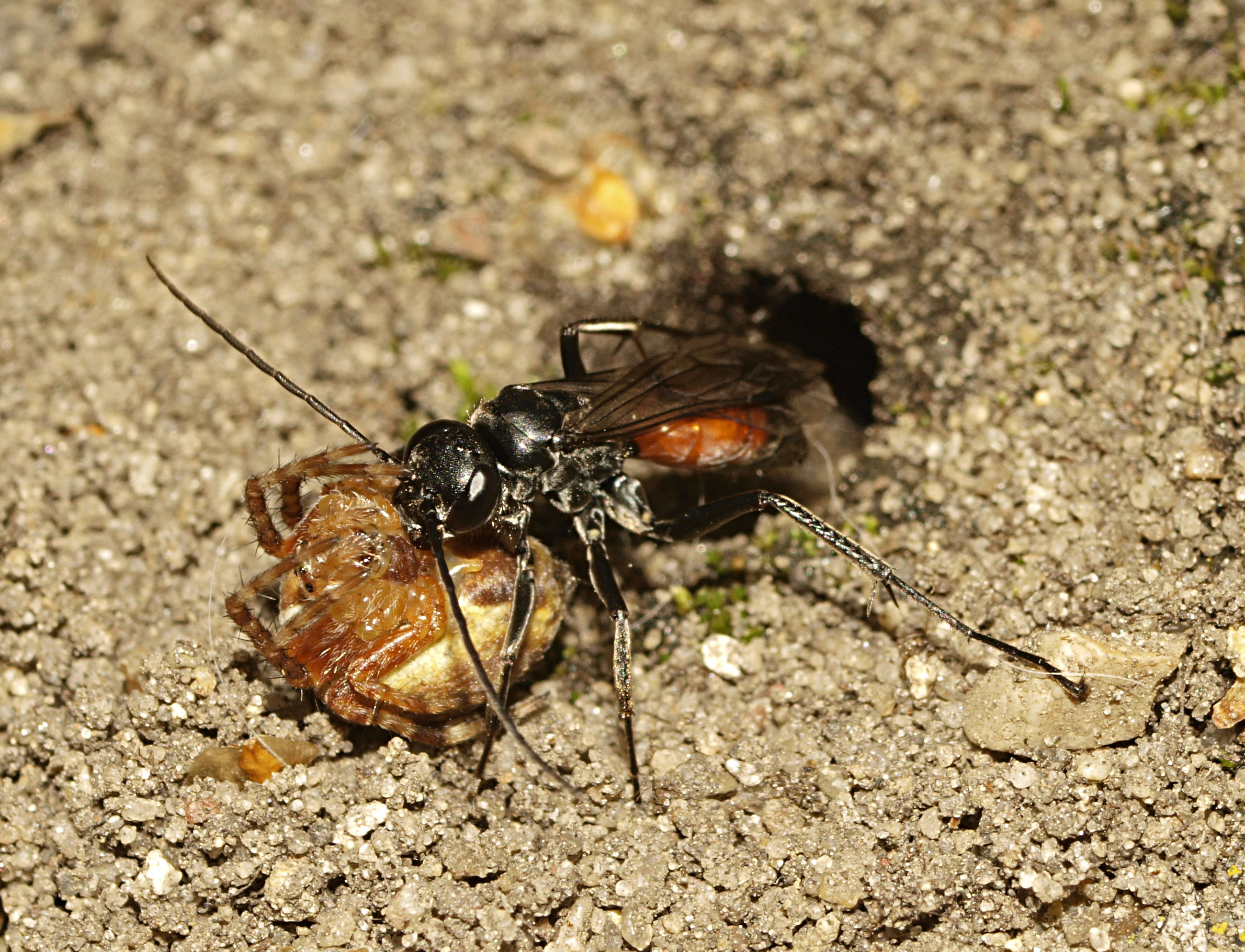
Caliadurgus fasciatellus female with Garden Spider

Caliadurgus fasciatellus is a species of spider wasp from the subfamily Pepsinae found from Western Europe to the Far East of Asia.

== Taxonomy ==
The name Caliadurgus was proposed originally by Pate in 1946 as a replacement for a preoccupied name, Calicurgus, published by Lepeletier in 1845. However, Pate explicitly selected Sphex hyalinata as the type species, while Kohl had selected Pompilus fasciatellus to be the type of Lepeletier's genus. Pate and others mistakenly thought that fasciatellus and hyalinata were the same species, but later researchers discovered that these were two different taxa, one now known as Caliadurgus fasciatellus and the other now known as Priocnemis hyalinata.

== Description ==
C. fasciatellus reaches 6–10 millimetres (0.24–0.39 in) in length. The 1st and 2nd segments of the abdomen are brownish red with white spurs in the middle and hind legs.

== Distribution ==
In Europe found from Great Britain east to Russia and Finland south to Spain and the Balkans. In Great Britain it is mainly confined to the south and east.

== Biology ==
The flight period in Britain is June to October with a peak in July and August. It is not known what plants are used by the adults for feeding on nectar.

It hunts orb web spiders of the genera Araneus and Meta. It excavates short, vertical burrows in sandy substrate once the prey has been caught. The prey is gripped in the jaws, between the thorax and abdomen, and transported to the burrow by being carried in front of the wasp. The prey is placed in a vertical position in the cell.

== Habitat ==
Exposed dry sandy or sandy clay soils.
