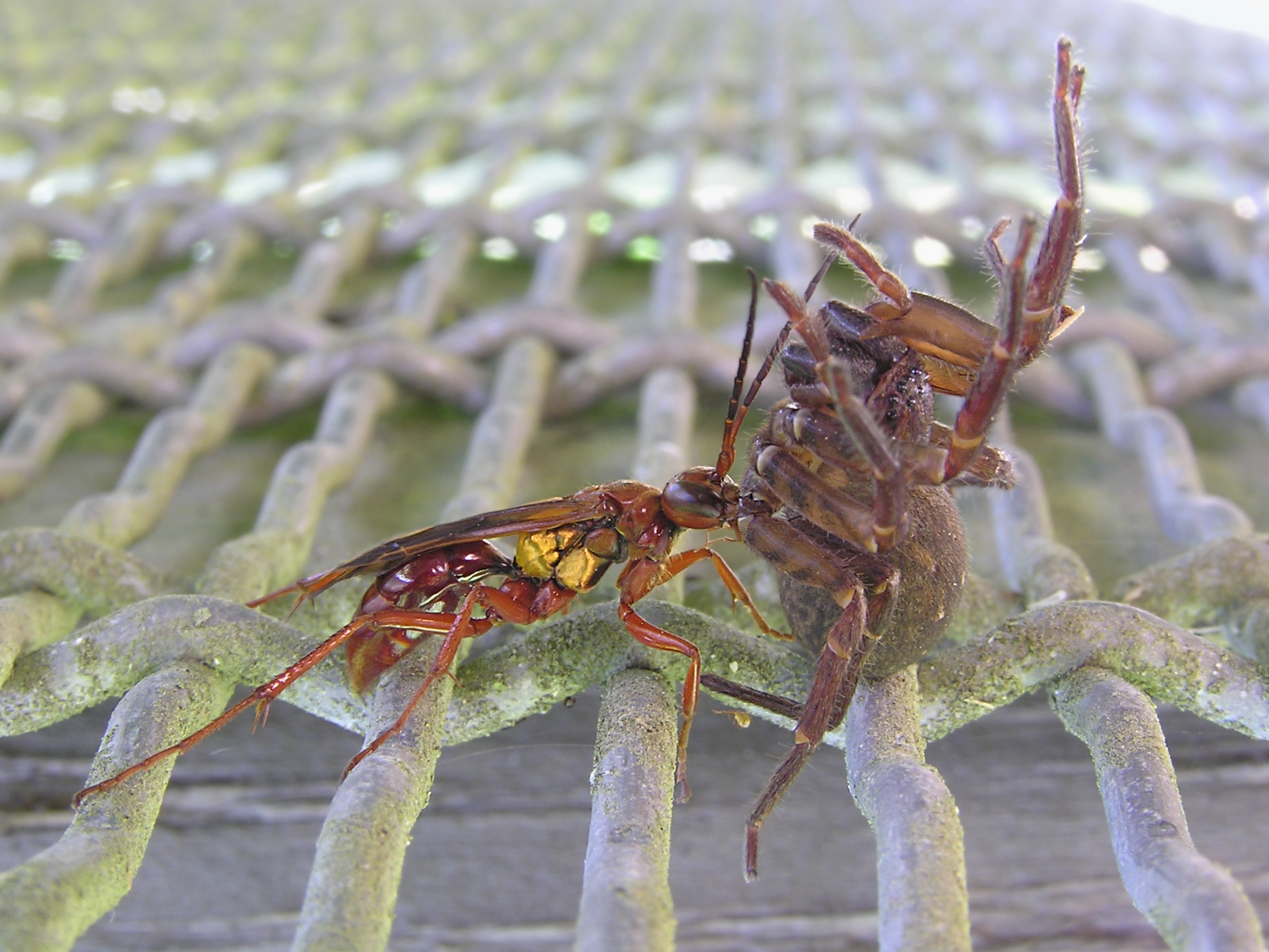

Scientific classification
- Domain: Eukaryota
- Kingdom: Animalia
- Phylum: Arthropoda
- Class: Insecta
- Order: Hymenoptera
- Family: Pompilidae
- Genus: Sphictostethus
- Species: S. nitidus

Binomial name
- Sphictostethus nitidus (Fabricius 1775)

Synonyms
- Chirodamus nitida (Fabricius, 1775); Chrysocurgus nitidus (Fabricius, 1791); Chrysocurgus wakefieldi (Kirby, 1881); Pompilus nitidus Fabricius, 1798; Priocnemis nitida (Fabricius, 1775); Priocnemis wakefieldi Kirby, 1881; Priocnemis wakefieldii Kirby, 1881; Prionocnemis wakefieldi (Kirby, 1881); Salius nitidus (Fabricius, 1798); Salius wakefieldi Kirby, 1881; Salius wakefieldii Kirby, 1881; Sphex nitida Fabricius, 1775

= Sphictostethus nitidus =

Species of wasp

Sphictostethus nitidus, the golden hunter wasp or red spider wasp, is a species of pepsid spider wasp endemic to New Zealand.

== Description ==
Females are reddish brown with yellow tints and with sooty spots; the males are also reddish brown with yellow-tinted wings, but these are never spotted. Females are 8.5-22.0 mm in length, and males 7.5-15.0 mm. They have a bold, jerky gait, and their vivid colour is aposematic to warn off visual predators such as birds and lizards. It is the only New Zealand Sphictostethus species that does not change from red to black when altitude or latitude increases. Its body stays red even at the most southern latitudes of its range.

== Biology ==
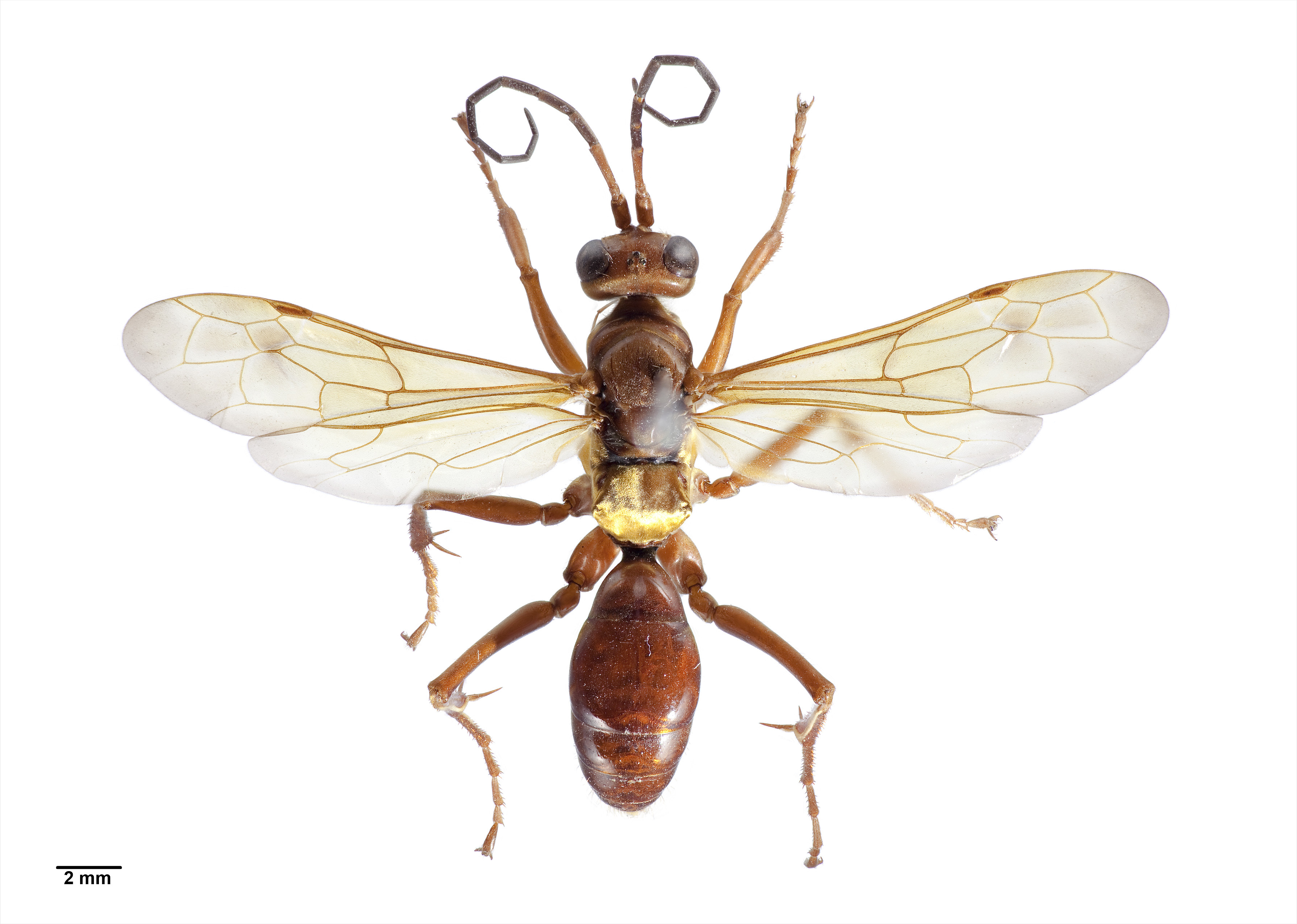
Sphictostethus nitidus specimen held at Auckland War Memorial Museum

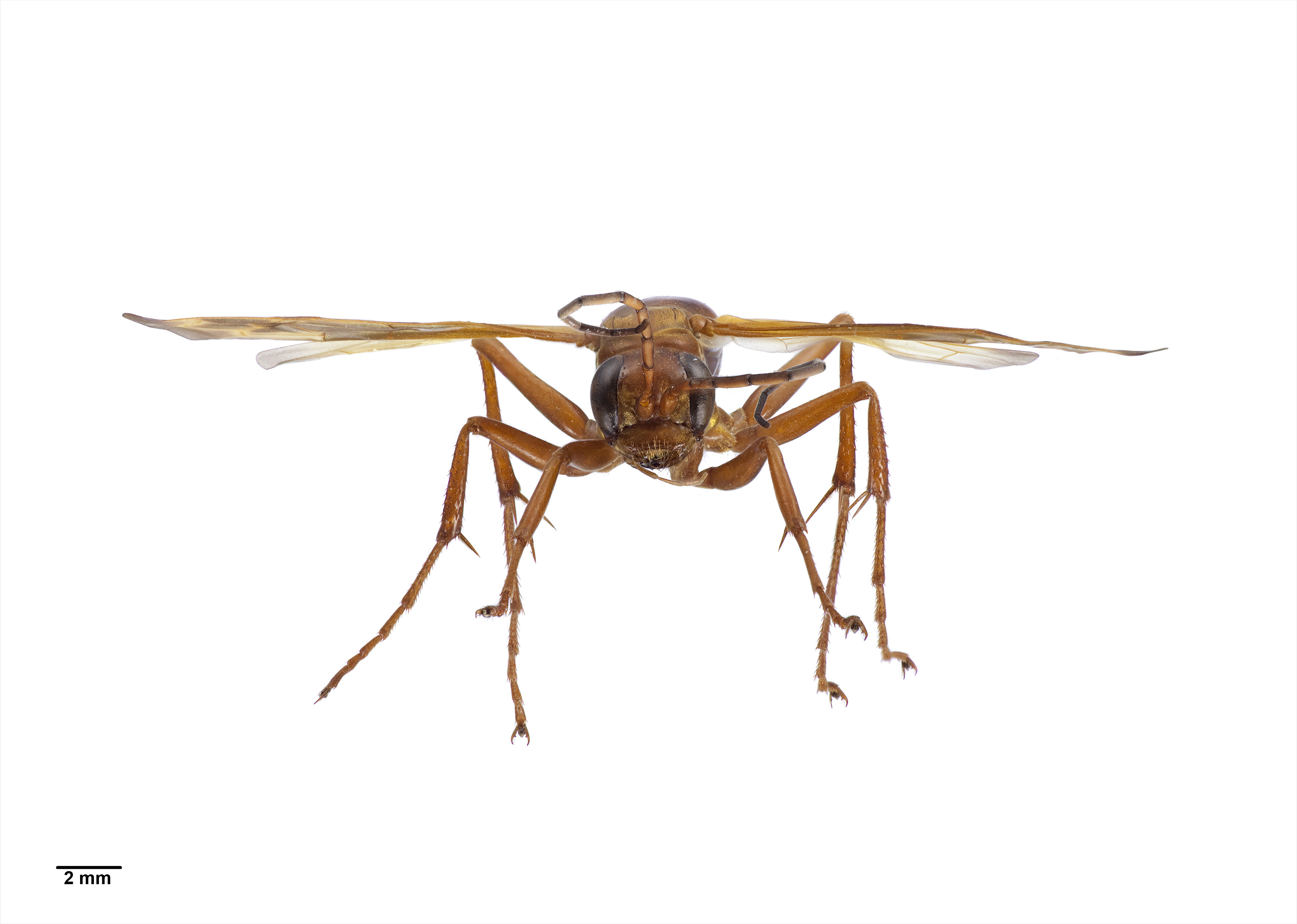
Sphictostethus nitidus specimen held at Auckland War Memorial Museum

S. nitidus hunts terrestrially in a variety of situations such as underneath and within logs, debris, and rotting wood, arboreally in shrubs and bushes, and on shingles and under boulders. The prey is usually detected by sight and pursued into the open. S. nitidus varies the attack depending on the species and size of spider. When Uliodon frenatus of any size is the prey, the wasp springs on to the back of the spider and stings the abdomen first before curving its abdomen and stinging the midventral region of the prosoma. Porrhothele antipodiana is attacked when it stands and faces the wasp with the first two pairs of legs held towards its attacker and upwards. The wasp moves forward until it is about 22 cm (9 in) in front the spider, then it makes a sudden leap towards it. The wasp and the spider grapple with each other, rolling over and over. The wasp apparently stings the spider indiscriminately in the abdomen until the spider ceases to struggle. The wasp then stings the spider in the midventer of the prosoma, and then between the chelicerae. The wasp then examines the spider's mouthparts before stinging it again at the base of the chelicerae. It finishes by brushing the tip of its own abdomen with alternate strokes of the entire hind tibia and tarsus for 3–8 minutes. The spider's paralysis is permanent. S. nitidus is kleptoparasitic on other members of its own species, and on other spider wasps, including Priocnemis monachus. Introduced house sparrows Passer domesticus have been observed stealing the paralysed spider prey from S. nitidus.

S. nitidus is not a digger and prefers to use pre-existing cavities for nesting. After capturing and immobilising a spider, the wasp either takes it to a temporary storage site or leaves it exposed on its back. It then either returns to its nest site or locates a suitable cavity for nesting, often after examining several potential cavities. It returns to the prey at intervals before eventually dragging it to the nest and leaving it 25 mm from the entrance to the nest, going inside before reappearing to drag the spider into the nest by its spinnerets. Often, the wasp waits in the cell, under the spider, for 2–26 hours before laying an egg. After laying, it pauses between 15 minutes and 2 hours before filling the burrow with fragments of vegetation varying from 5 to 56 mm in length which are rammed firmly into place with the wasp's abdomen. When the nest is closed, the wasp camouflages the entrance with twigs and bark which is dragged across it. The wasp examines the nest and if satisfied it leaves.

Males emerge 3–8 days prior to the females; copulation usually occurs in foliage, often in the crowns of bushes, the males running over leaves in a distinctive manner pursuing any females that appear.

Prey recorded include Uliodon frenatus, Porrhothele antipodiana and Neoramia otagoa.

== Habitat ==
S. nitidus shows a preference for open, exposed places and tolerates a wide range of habitats. It has shown itself to be adaptable and is common in suburban back yards, dunes, dry riverbeds, forest clearings, grasslands, and clay banks. Nests can be found from sea level up to at least 1370 m, in various substrates, but often among boulders, and especially beneath flat stones and concrete, where it can gain access to cavities through cracks.

== Distribution ==
This species is endemic to New Zealand on both the North and South Islands and some offshore islands.
