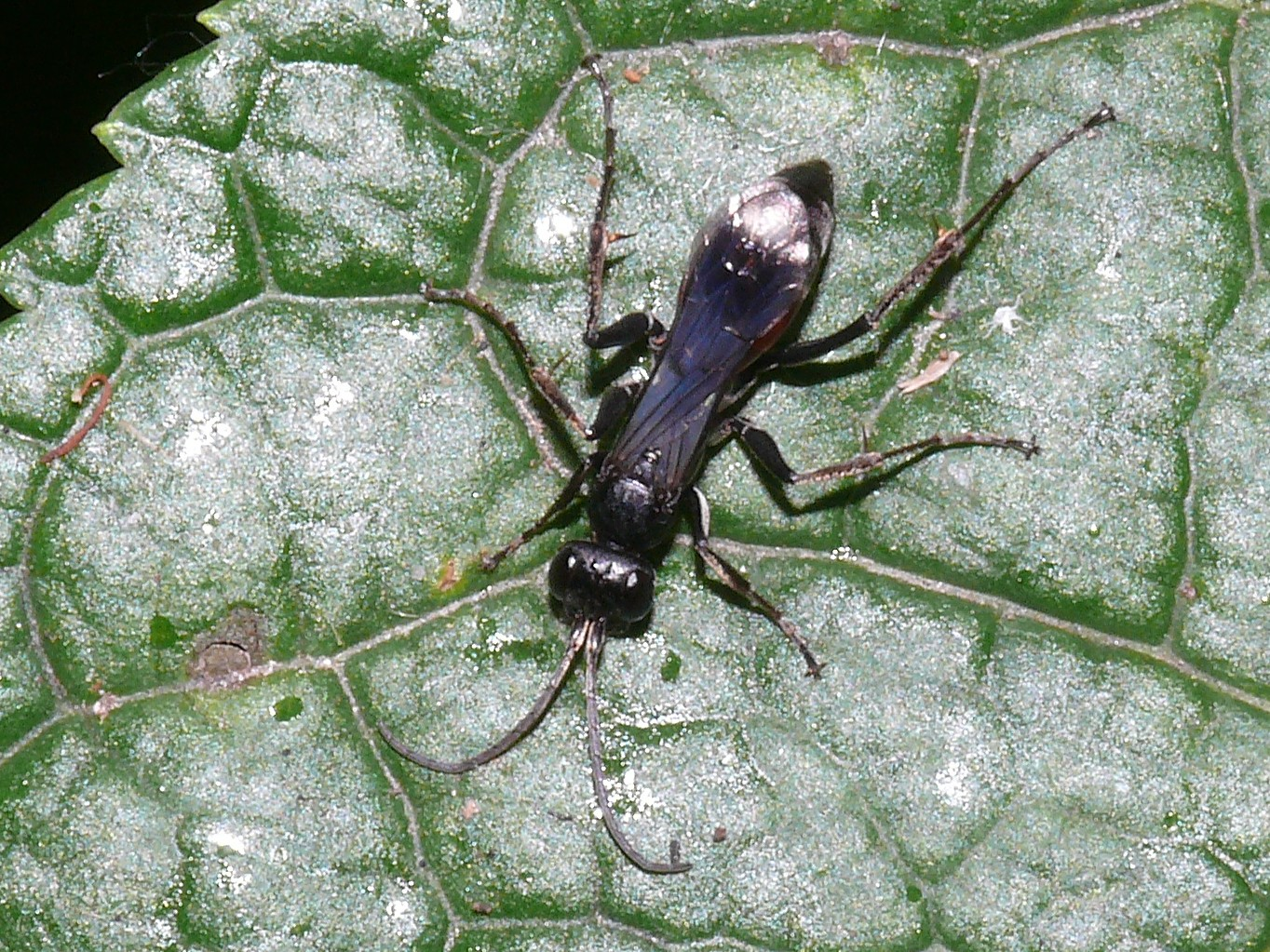

Scientific classification
- Domain: Eukaryota
- Kingdom: Animalia
- Phylum: Arthropoda
- Class: Insecta
- Order: Hymenoptera
- Family: Pompilidae
- Genus: Priocnemis
- Species: P. hyalinata

Binomial name
- Priocnemis hyalinata (Fabricius, 1793)

Synonyms
- Sphex hyalinata Fabricius, 1793; Pompilus femoralis Dahlbom, 1829; Pseudagenia discrepans Costa, 1887; Priocnemis trifurcus Radoszkowski, 1888; Priocnemis vitripennis Verhoeff, 1892; Salius notatulus Saunders, 1896; Priocnemis pseudofemoralis Sustera, 1938; Priocnemis taigaica Wolf, 1967

= Priocnemis hyalinata =

Species of wasp

Priocnemis hyalinata is a large species of pepsine spider wasp.

== Taxonomy ==
The genus name Caliadurgus was proposed originally by Pate in 1946 as a replacement for a preoccupied name, Calicurgus, published by Lepeletier in 1845. However, Pate explicitly selected Sphex hyalinata as the type species, while Kohl had selected Pompilus fasciatellus to be the type of Lepeletier's genus. Pate and others mistakenly thought that fasciatellus and hyalinata were the same species, but later researchers discovered that these were two different taxa, one now known as Caliadurgus fasciatellus and the other now known as Priocnemis hyalinata.
