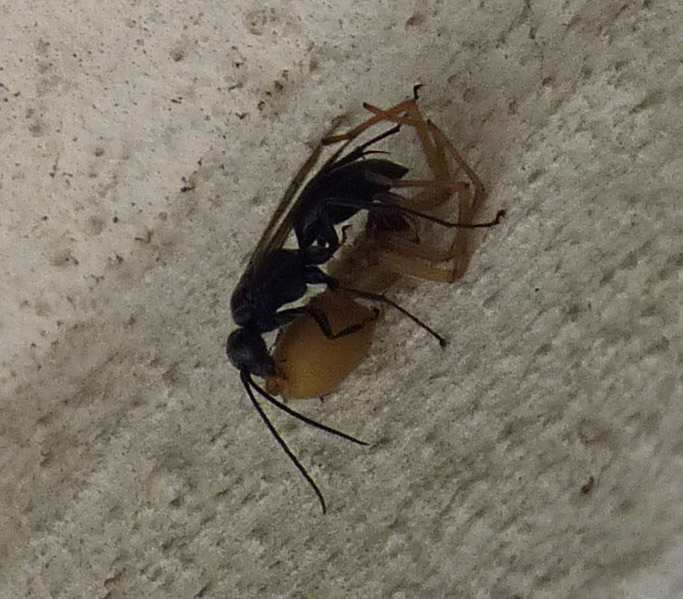
- Auplopus carbonarius, with prey.

Scientific classification
- Kingdom: Animalia
- Phylum: Arthropoda
- Class: Insecta
- Order: Hymenoptera
- Family: Pompilidae
- Subfamily: Pepsinae
- Tribe: Ageniellini

Genera
- 17 genera (see text)

= Ageniellini =

Tribe of insects

Ageniellini, known as the mud-nesting spider wasps, is a tribe of spider wasps in the subfamily Pepsinae.

== Description ==
The Ageniellini are slender-bodied spider wasps. They are distinguished from most other Pompilidae by their petiolate abdominal structure and typical absence of a transverse carina on the first segment of the gaster. These traits are, however, shared with Melanagenia of the tribe Pepsini, which is separated by the lack of malar space, deep lateral sulcus of the pronotum, and wing venation.

== Distribution ==
The tribe Ageniellini is cosmopolitan.

== Behavior ==
Members of Ageniellini have one of three lifestyles that either invade the nests of other spider wasp nests as kleptoparasites, build their own nests in dry soil, or build thimble-shaped nests out of mud. The most common of these nesting strategies is building mud nests, which are frequently communal in contrast to most other spider wasp groups. As typical of the rest of the family, the Ageniellini provision their nests with a single spider and then lay an egg on it. Most of the species remove the legs of their spider prey before bringing it to the nest. Amputation of spider legs is rarely done by species other than those of the Ageniellini.

== Genera ==
There are 17 genera within Ageniellini.

- Ageniella Banks, 1912
- Atopagenia Wasbauer, 1987
- Auplopus Spinola, 1841
- Cyemagenia Arnold, 1946
- Dichragenia Haupt, 1950
- Dimorphagenia Evans, 1973
- Eragenia Banks, 1946
- Machaerothrix Haupt, 1938
- Macromerella Banks, 1934
- Macromeris Lepeletier, 1831
- Melanagenia Wahis, 2009
- Mystacagenia Evans, 1973
- Paragenia Bingham, 1896
- Phanagenia Banks, 1933
- Phanochilus Banks, 1944
- Poecilagenia Haupt, 1926
- Priocnemella Banks, 1925
