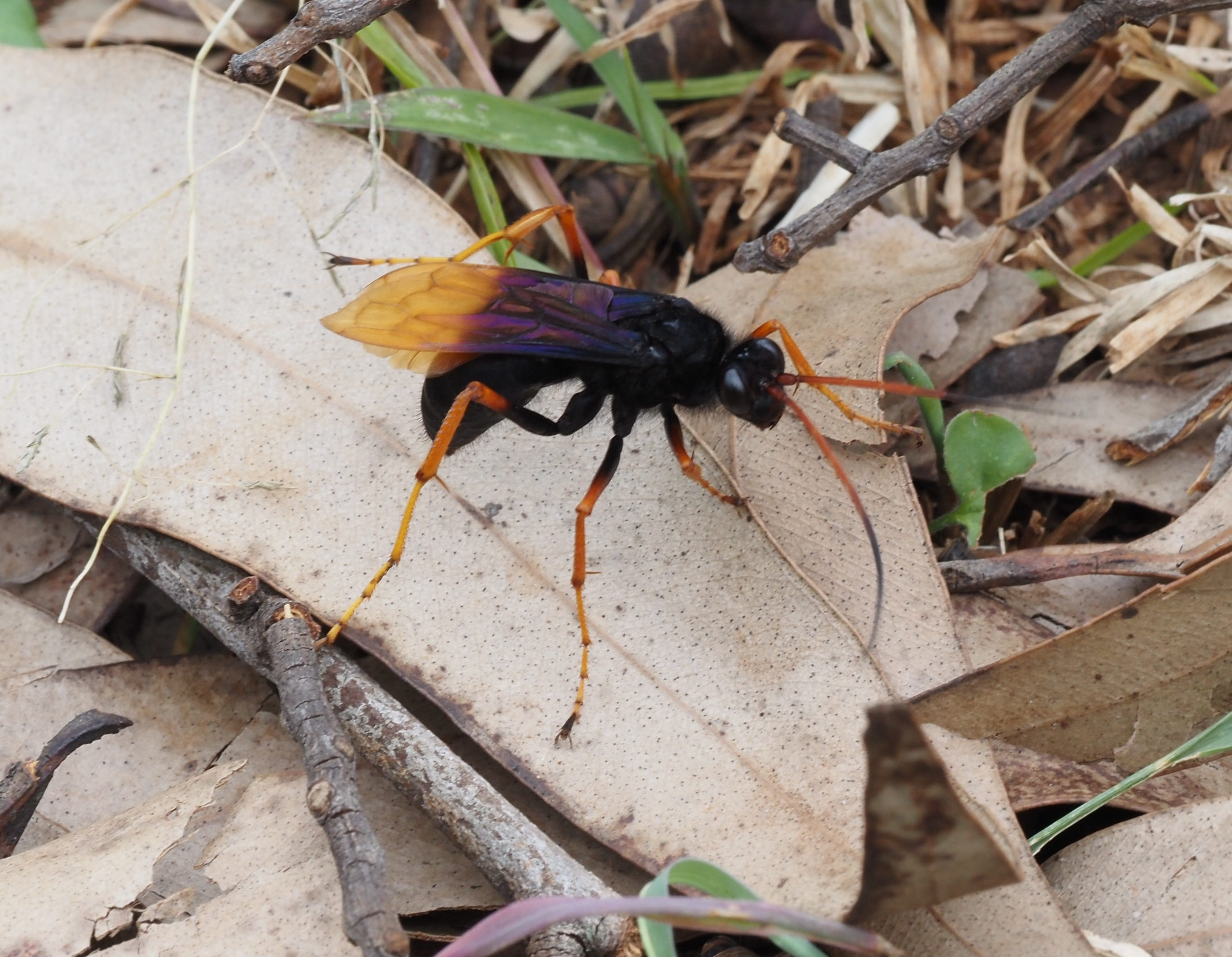
- Java caroliwaterhousei from Kenya

Scientific classification
- Kingdom: Animalia
- Phylum: Arthropoda
- Class: Insecta
- Order: Hymenoptera
- Family: Pompilidae
- Subfamily: Pepsinae
- Tribe: Pepsini
- Genus: Java; Pate, 1946

Type species
- Sphex nigrita Fabricius, 1781

= Java (wasp) =

Genus of wasps

Java is a genus of tarantula wasps (Pepsinae) with species in the Afrotropical and Indo-Australasian regions. Species in the genus include:

- Java atropos (Smith, 1855)
- Java caroliwaterhousei (Cameron, 1910)
- Java claviger Wahis, 2000
- Java confector (Smith, 1860)
  - Java confector confector (Smith, 1860)
  - Java confector marginata (Haupt, 1950)
  - Java confector obiensis Wahis, 2000
  - Java confector visaya Wahis, 2000
- Java nigricornis (Tullgren, 1904)
- Java nigrita (Fabricius, 1781) [=Priocnemis (Cyphononyx) concolor Taschenberg, 1869]
  - Java nigrita aspasia (Smith, 1859)
  - Java nigrita floresiana Wahis, 2000
  - Java nigrita nigrita (Fabricius, 1781)
- Java rizali (Banks, 1934)
- Java rufocula Wahis, 2000
  - Java rufocula formosana Wahis, 2000
  - Java rufocula rufocula Wahis, 2000
