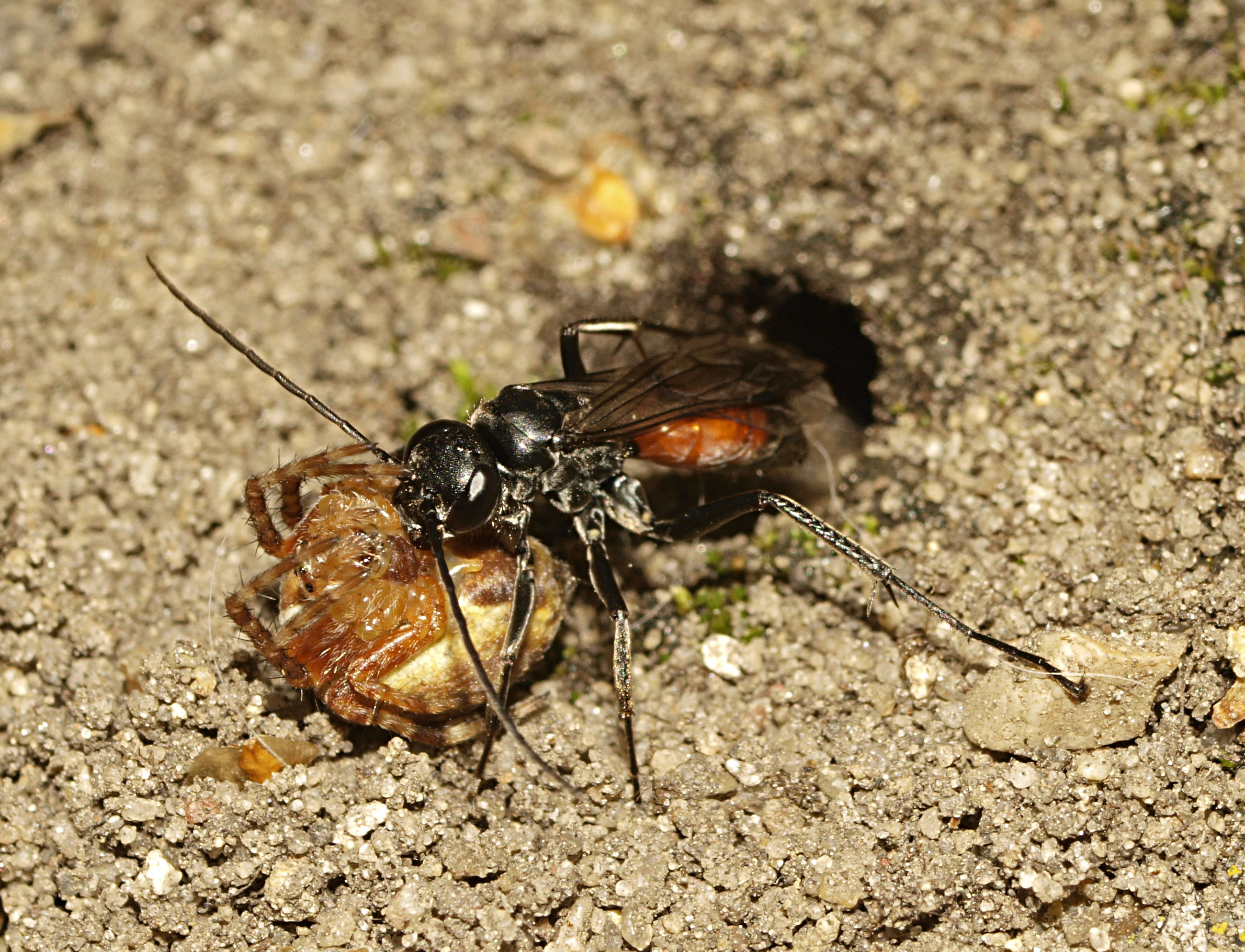
- Caliadurgus fasciatellus female with Garden Spider

Scientific classification
- Kingdom: Animalia
- Phylum: Arthropoda
- Clade: Pancrustacea
- Class: Insecta
- Order: Hymenoptera
- Family: Pompilidae
- Subfamily: Pepsinae
- Genus: Caliadurgus; Pate, 1946

Type species
- Pompilus fasciatellus Spinola, 1808

Synonyms
- Calicurgus Lepeletier, 1845 (Preocc.)

= Caliadurgus =

Genus of wasps

Caliadurgus is a genus of spider wasps of the subfamily Pepsinae. These are medium-sized black spider wasps with some red. They have a catholic habitat choice and their preferred prey are spiders of the families Araneidae and Tetragnathidae. They have a Holarctic and Neotropical distribution.

== Taxonomy ==
The genus name Caliadurgus was proposed originally by Pate in 1946 as a replacement for a preoccupied name, Calicurgus, published by Lepeletier in 1845. However, Pate explicitly selected Sphex hyalinata as the type species, while Kohl had selected Pompilus fasciatellus to be the type of Lepeletier's genus. Pate and others mistakenly thought that fasciatellus and hyalinata were the same species, but later researchers discovered that these were two different taxa, one now known as Caliadurgus fasciatellus and the other now known as Priocnemis hyalinata. However, under the ICZN, Article 67.8, the type species of a replacement name is the same as the type species of the name it replaces.

=== Selected species ===
- Caliadurgus cinereus (Fox, 1897)
- Caliadurgus fasciatellus (Spinola, 1808)
- Caliadurgus gayii (Spinola, 1851)
- Caliadurgus maculatellus (Taschenberg, 1869)
- Caliadurgus modestus (Smith, 1873)
- Caliadurgus ochraceus Roig Alsina, 1982
- Caliadurgus sigillipes (Taschenberg, 1869)
- Caliadurgus subandinus Roig Alsina, 1982
- Caliadurgus ussuriensis (Gussakovskij, 1932)
