= Eragenia =

Scientific classification
- Kingdom: Animalia
- Phylum: Arthropoda
- Class: Insecta
- Order: Hymenoptera
- Family: Pompilidae
- Tribe: Ageniellini
- Genus: Eragenia; Banks, 1946

Genus of spider wasps

Eragenia is a genus of mud-nesting spider wasps in the family Pompilidae, formerly included in the genus Priocnemella. The genus has some 16 described species, found in the found in the Neotropical and Nearctic realms. There is only one species in North America, Eragenia tabascoensis, restricted to southern Texas.

== Description ==
Wasps of the genus Eragenia are small, thin, and wiry. These wasps look almost identical to those of the genus Ageniella, though they are separated by two things: Eragenia has a "trough-like impression on the lateroapical margin of the clypeus", and a "curved, spine-like bristle on the apex of the anterior tibia". Eragenia tabascoensis is tawny (red, can be yellow) in color, with yellow wings. The wings are banded in black.

== Habitat ==
This genus lives in open areas, and at the edges of forests. It can live in forests as well, hunting in sunny patches. Adults are not found at flowers.

== Nests ==
Eragenia congrua, found in Brazil, uses Corrinid spiders to provision the nests, which are bored in soft wood.
