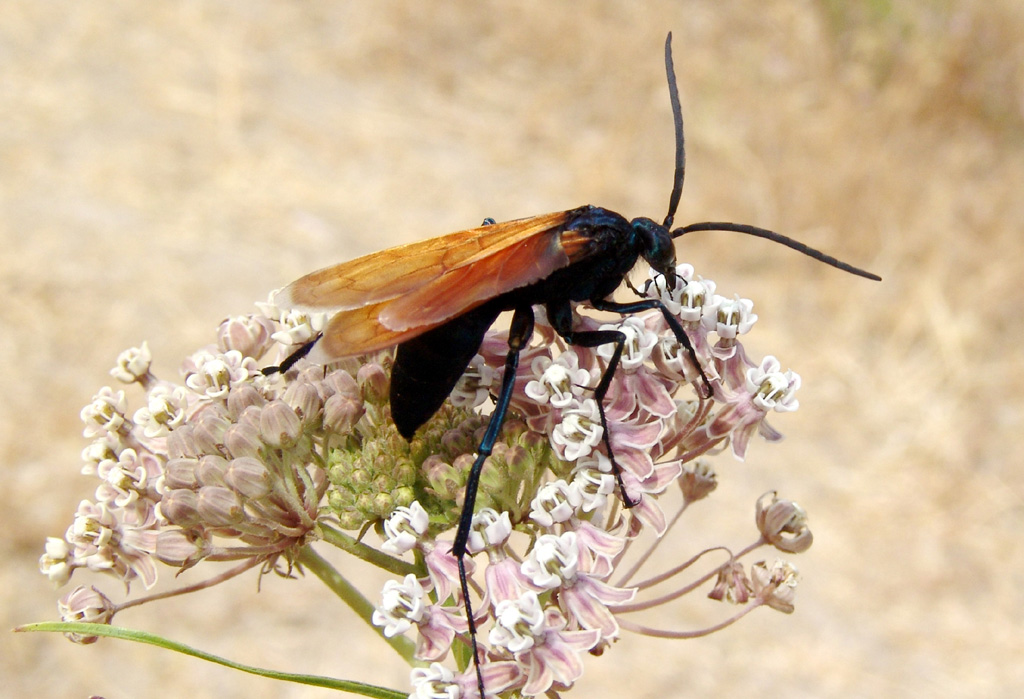

Scientific classification
- Kingdom: Animalia
- Phylum: Arthropoda
- Clade: Pancrustacea
- Class: Insecta
- Order: Hymenoptera
- Family: Pompilidae
- Subfamily: Pepsinae

Tribes
- Ageniellini; Deuterageniini; Pepsini; Priocnemini; Psoropempulini

= Pepsinae =

Subfamily of wasps

The Pepsinae are a subfamily of the spider wasp family, Pompilidae, including the two genera of large tarantula hawks, as well as many genera of smaller species.

== Biology ==
A female spider wasp generally captures and stings a spider to paralise it; this is for their larvae to feed on. However, the wasps of this subfamily display a range of nesting behaviours:

- using preexisting cavities;
- using the immobilised spider's burrow;
- digging a burrow in soil;
- building nests of mud;
- parasitoids; and
- kleptoparasites.

== Taxonomy ==
Pepsinae can be defined by:

- sternite 2 with a distinct transverse groove;
- mesofemur and metafemur without subapical spine-like setae set in grooves or pits;
- the metatibia with apical spine-like setae of uniform length, the setae not splayed; and
- vein Cu1 of fore wing is simple at its base, without any definite downward deflection, i.e. the second discal cell (2D) is without a ‘pocket’.

The subfamily Pepsinae comprises 84 genera. These include 16 genera of Ageniellini, 7 genera of Deuterageniini, 48 genera of Pepsini, 11 genera of Priocnemini, 1 genus of Psoropempulini, and 1 genus unplaced to tribe.

=== Tribe Ageniellini ===
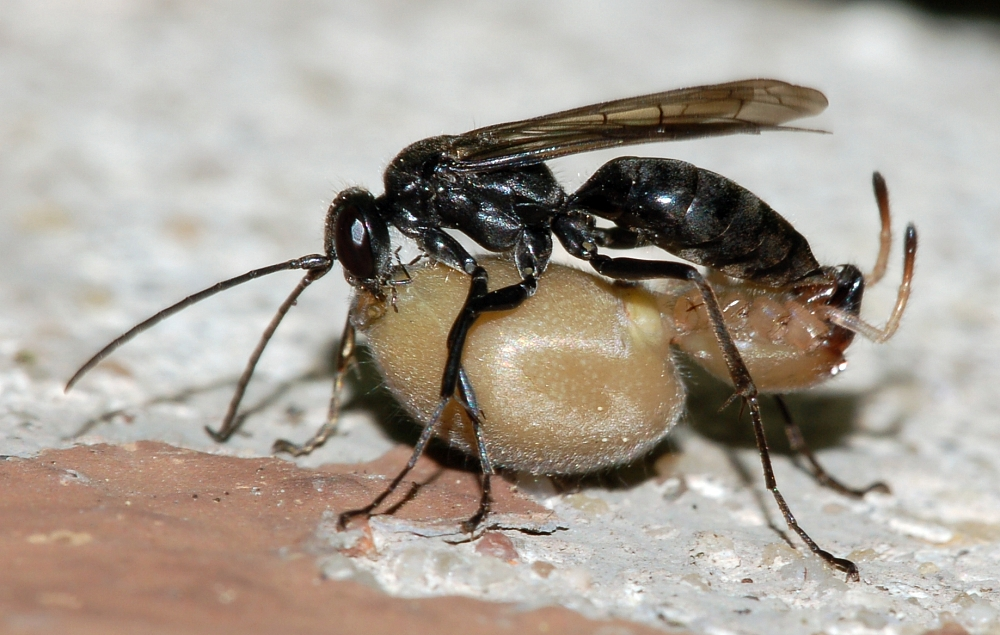
Auplopus carbonarius with prey

- Ageniella Banks, 1912
- Atopagenia Wasbauer, 1987
- Auplopus Spinola, 1841
- Cyemagenia Arnold, 1946
- Dichragenia Haupt, 1950
- Dimorphagenia Evans, 1973
- Eragenia Banks, 1946
- Machaerothrix Haupt, 1938
- Macromerella Banks, 1934
- Macromeris Lepeletier, 1831
- Mystacagenia Evans, 1973
- Paragenia Bingham, 1896
- Phanagenia Banks, 1933
- Phanochilus Banks, 1944
- Poecilagenia Haupt, 1926
- Priocnemella Banks, 1925

=== Tribe Deuterageniini ===
- Deuteragenia Šustera, 1912
- Dipogon Fox, 1897
- Kuriloagenia Loktionov & Lelej, 2014
- Myrmecodipogon Ishikawa, 1965
- Nipponodipogon Ishikawa, 1965
- Stigmatodipogon Ishikawa, 1965
- Winnemanella Krombein, 1962

=== Tribe Pepsini ===
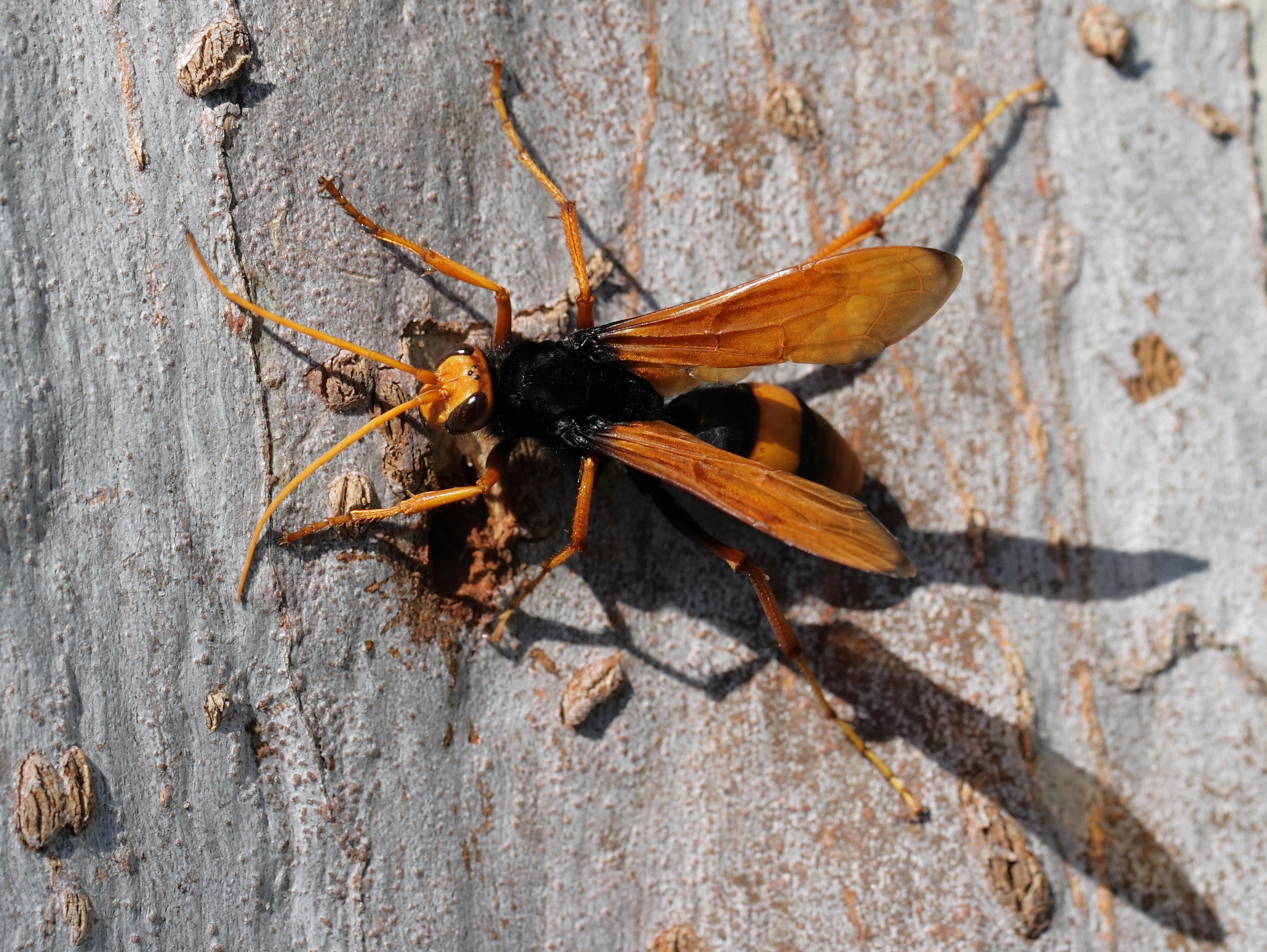
Orange spider wasp Cryptocheilus bicolor (or Heterodontonyx bicolor)

- Abernessia Arlé, 1947
- Adirostes Banks, 1946
- Aimatocare Roig-Alsina, 1989
- Allaporus Banks, 1933
- Alococurgus Haupt, 1937
- Anacyphonyx Banks, 1946
- Austrosalius Turner, 1917
- Calopompilus Ashmead, 1900
- Chirodamus Haliday, 1837
- Chrysagenia Haupt, 1941
- Cordyloscelis Arnold, 1935
- Cryptocheilus Panzer, 1806
- Cyphononyx Dahlbom, 1845
- Dentagenia Haupt, 1933
- Derochorses Banks, 1941
- Dinosalius Banks, 1934
- Diplonyx de Saussure, 1887
- Dolichocurgus Haupt, 1937
- Entypus Dahlbom, 1843
- Epipompilus Kohl, 1884
- Eremocurgus Haupt, 1937
- Formosacesa Koçak et Kemal, 2008
- Hemipepsis Dahlbom, 1844
- Herbstellus Wahis, 2002
- Heterodontonyx Haupt, 1935
- Hormopogonius Arnold,1934
- Hypoferreola Ashmead, 1902
- Iridomimus Evans, 1970
- Java Pate, 1946
- Lepidocnemis Haupt, 1930
- Leptodialepis Haupt, 1929
- Melanagenia Wahis, 2009
- Micragenia Haupt, 1926
- Microcurgus Haupt, 1937
- Minagenia Banks, 1934
- Mygnimia Shuckard, 1840
- Ochragenia Haupt, 1959
- Pachycurgus Haupt, 1937
- Paraclavelia Haupt, 1930
- Pepsis Fabricius, 1804
- Plagicurgus Roig-Alsina, 1982
- Pompilocalus Roig-Alsina, 1989
- Poecilocurgus Haupt, 1937
- Schistompilus Tsuneki,1988
- Schistonyx Saussure, 1887
- Trachyglyptus Arnold, 1934
- Xenocurgus Haupt, 1937

=== Tribe Priocnemini ===
- Caliadurgus Pate, 1946
- Claveliocnemis Wolf, 1968
- Clistoderes Banks, 1934
- Ctenopriocnemis Ishikawa, 1962
- Eopompilus Gussakovskij, 1932
- Eopriocnemis Loktionov & Lelej, 2019
- Malloscelis Haupt, 1935
- Platydialepis Haupt, 1941
- Priocnemis Schiødte, 1837
- Priocnessus Banks, 1925
- Sphictostethus Kohl, 1884

=== Tribe Psoropempulini ===
- Psoropempula Evans, 1974

=== Incertae sedis ===
- Aberropompilus Shimizu & Wahis, 2016
