= Diplonyx =

Scientific classification
- Domain: Eukaryota
- Kingdom: Animalia
- Phylum: Arthropoda
- Class: Insecta
- Order: Hymenoptera
- Family: Pompilidae
- Subfamily: Pepsinae
- Genus: Diplonyx de Saussure, 1887

Type species
- Cyphononyx campanulatus de Saussure, 1887

Genus of wasps

Diplonyx is a genus of spider wasps in the family Pompilidae.

== Selected species ==
The following species belongs to this genus:

- Diplonyx campanulatus (de Saussure, 1892)
