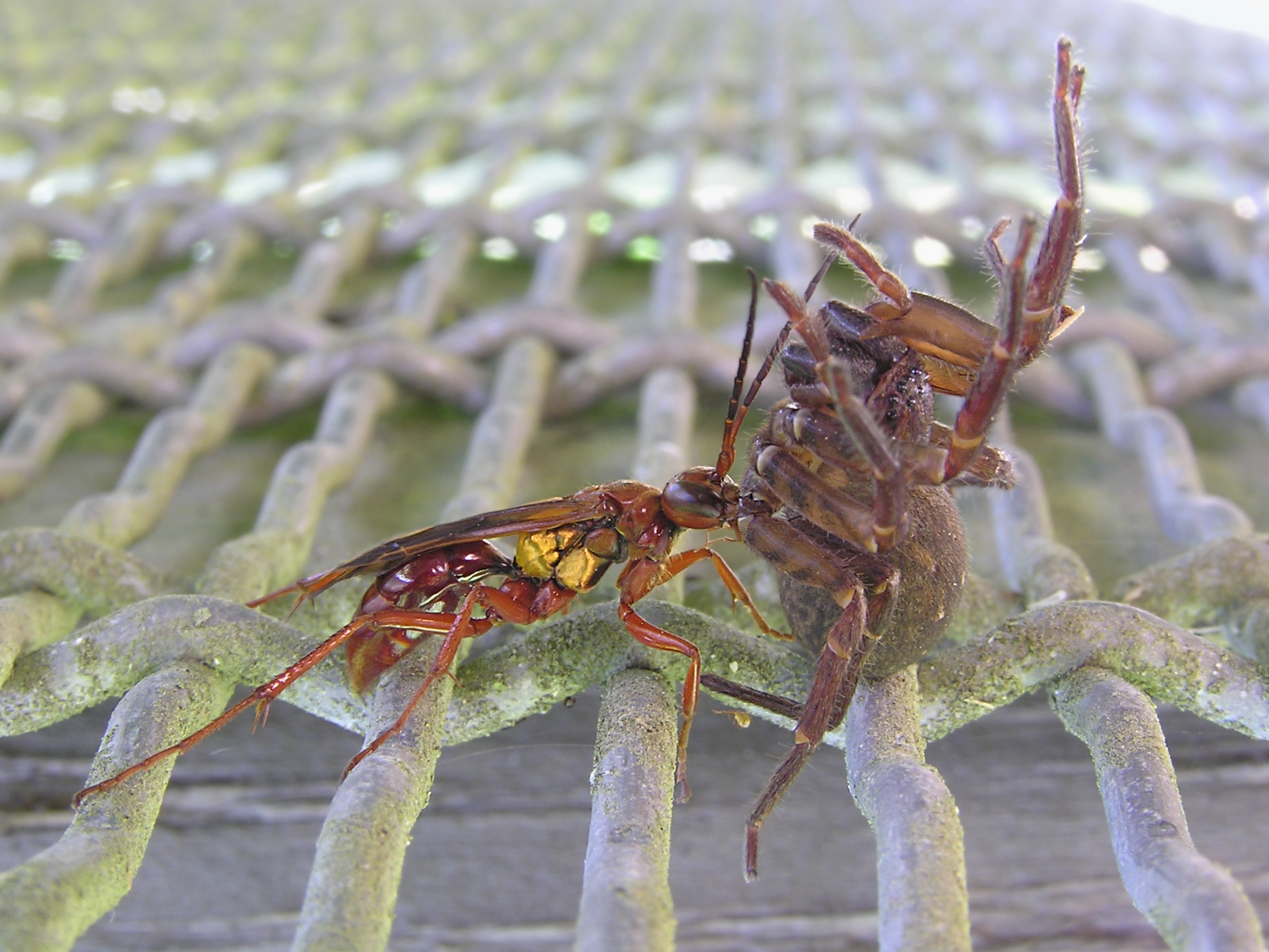
- Sphictostethus nitidus

Scientific classification
- Domain: Eukaryota
- Kingdom: Animalia
- Phylum: Arthropoda
- Class: Insecta
- Order: Hymenoptera
- Family: Pompilidae
- Subfamily: Pepsinae
- Genus: Sphictostethus; Kohl, 1884

Type species
- Sphictostethus gravesii (Haliday, 1837)

= Sphictostethus =

Genus of wasps

Sphictostethus is a genus of pepsine spider wasps which has a dispersed southern Pacific distribution which encompasses Chile, eastern Australia, Tasmania, and New Zealand, and is very similar to the distribution of the southern beeches of the genus Nothofagus. The type species is S. gravesii, but the genus's greatest diversity is in Australia, especially in the more humid and temperate south east, with one species, S. insularis, endemic to Lord Howe Island.

== Species ==
The species in the genus Sphictostethus include:

- Sphictostethus aliciae (Turner, 1914)
- Sphictostethus calvus Harris 1987
- Sphictostethus connectens (Turner, 1915)
- Sphictostethus dorrigoensis Krogmann & Austin 2011
- Sphictostethus flaviceρs (Guérin, 1830)
- Sphictostethus fugax (Fabricus 1775)
- Sphictostethus gadali Krogmann & Austin 2011
- Sphictostethus geevestoni Krogmann & Austin 2011
- Sphictostethus gravesii (Haliday, 1837)
- Sphictostethus haoae Krogmann & Austin 2011
- Sphictostethus infandus (Smith, 1868)
- Sphictostethus insularis Krogmann & Austin 2011
- Sphictostethus minus (Kohl, 1905)
- Sphictostethus montanus Krogmann & Austin 2011
- Sphictostethus nitidus Fabricius 1775 golden hunter wasp
- Sphictostethus obscurus (Sielfeld, 1973)
- Sphictostethus picadillycircus Krogmann & Austin 2011
- Sphictostethus thaumastarius (Kohl, 1905)
- Sphictostethus walteri Krogmann & Austin 2011
- Sphictostethus xanthochrous (Turner, 1915)
- Sphictostethus xanthopus (Spinola, 1851)
- Sphictostethus yidyam Krogmann & Austin 2011
