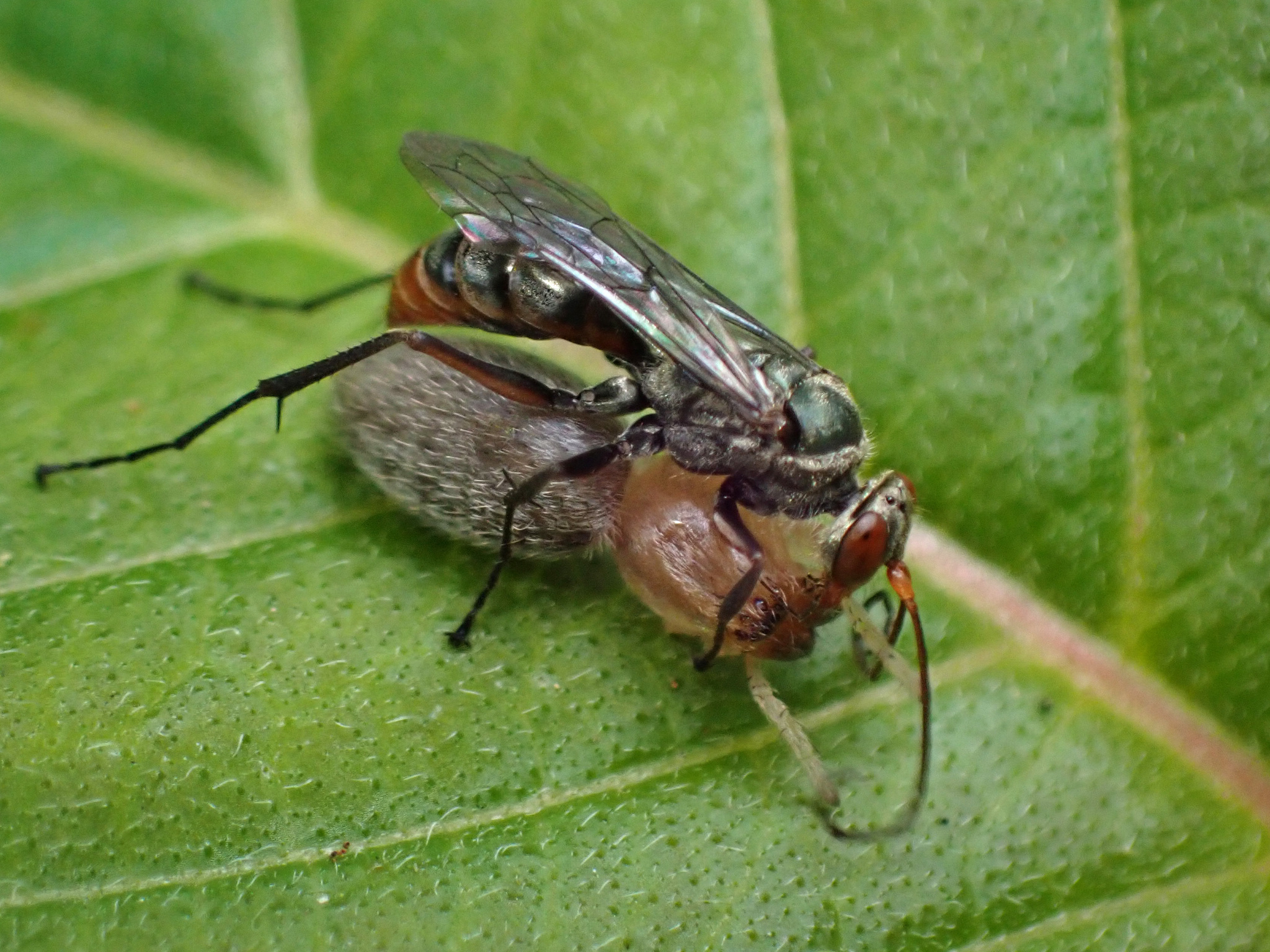
- Ageniella salti with a sac spider

Scientific classification
- Kingdom: Animalia
- Phylum: Arthropoda
- Class: Insecta
- Order: Hymenoptera
- Family: Pompilidae
- Tribe: Ageniellini
- Genus: Ageniella; Banks, 1912

= Ageniella =

Genus of wasps

Ageniella is a genus of mud-nesting spider wasps in the family Pompilidae.

== Description ==
Spider wasps in the genus Ageniella are smaller and thinner than many others, though these proportions are shared by the members of the tribe Ageniellini. Some individual species are reddish/pink, such as Ageniella conflicta. Similarly, most have banding on the wings. The wings can be smoky or clear, with the smoky ones having the banding and the clear ones lacking in this feature.

== Distribution ==
Ageniella species are found in the Neotropical and Nearctic realms.

== Habitat ==
Open areas, fields, meadows, sometimes near buildings.

== Nests ==
Trumpet (or thimble) shaped, stocked with one spider each, and containing one egg.

== Subgenera ==
- Ageniella (subgenus)
- Ameragenia
- Leucophrus
- Nemagenia
- Priophanes

== Species gallery ==
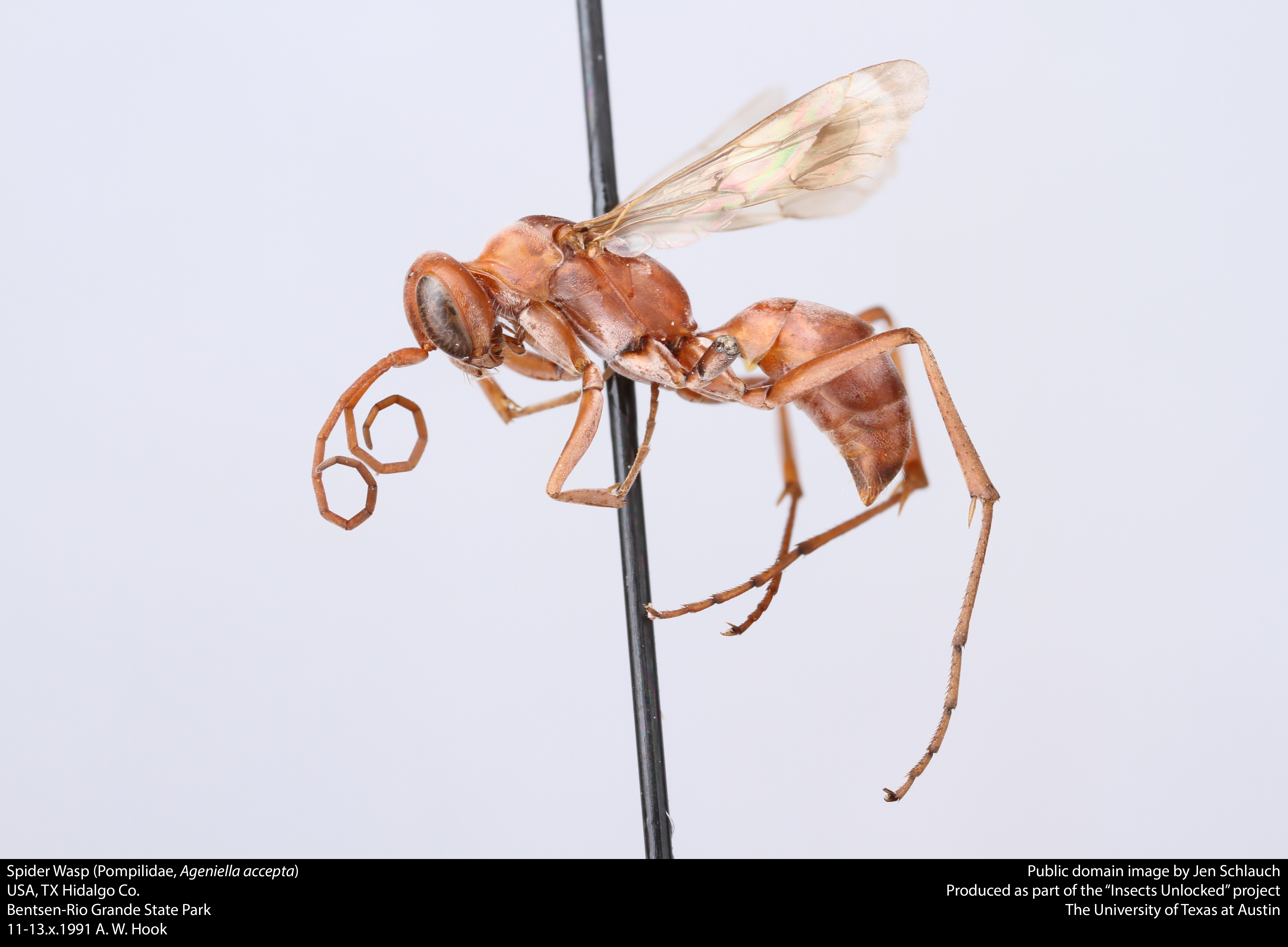
A. accepta (female)

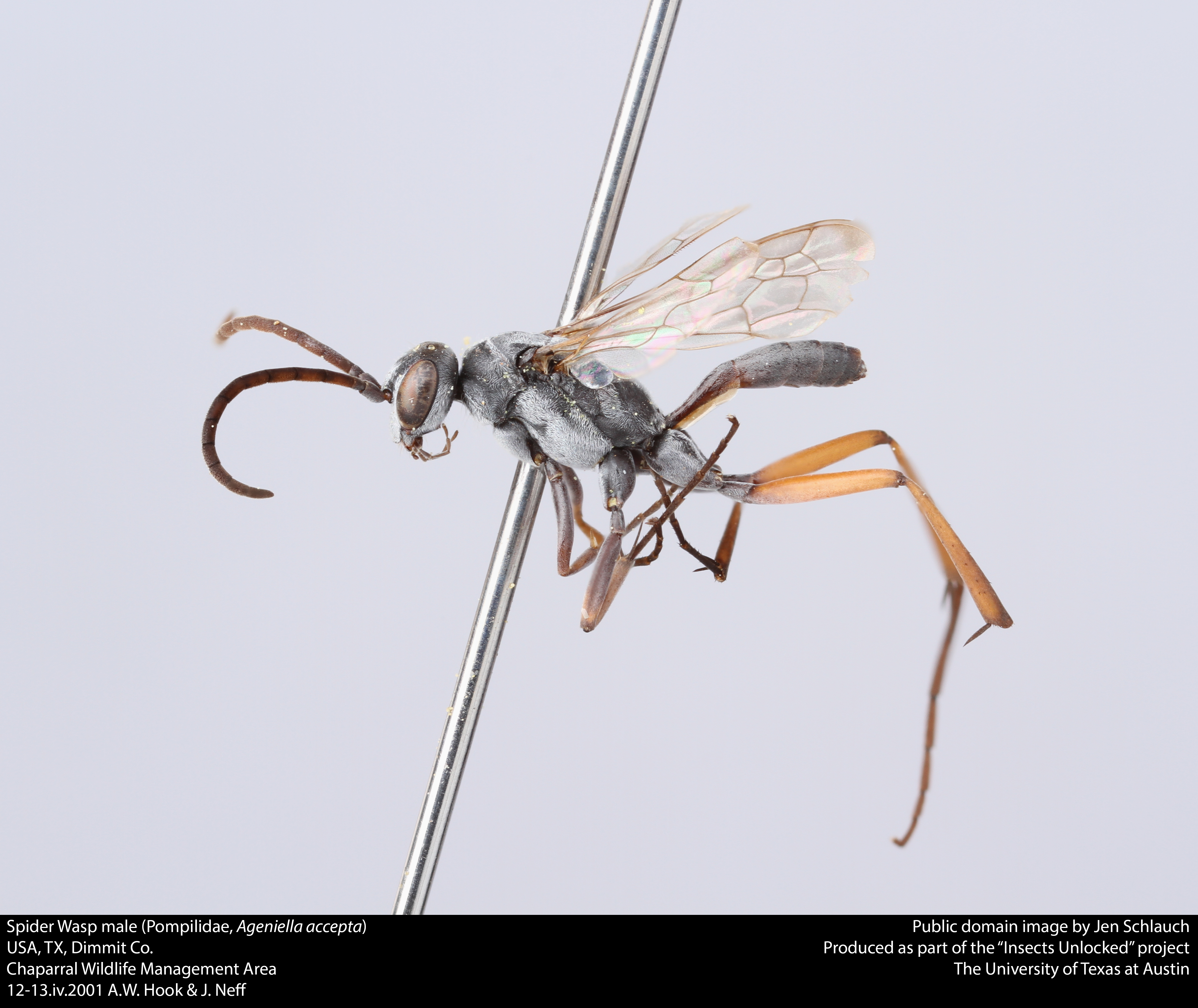
A. accepta (male)

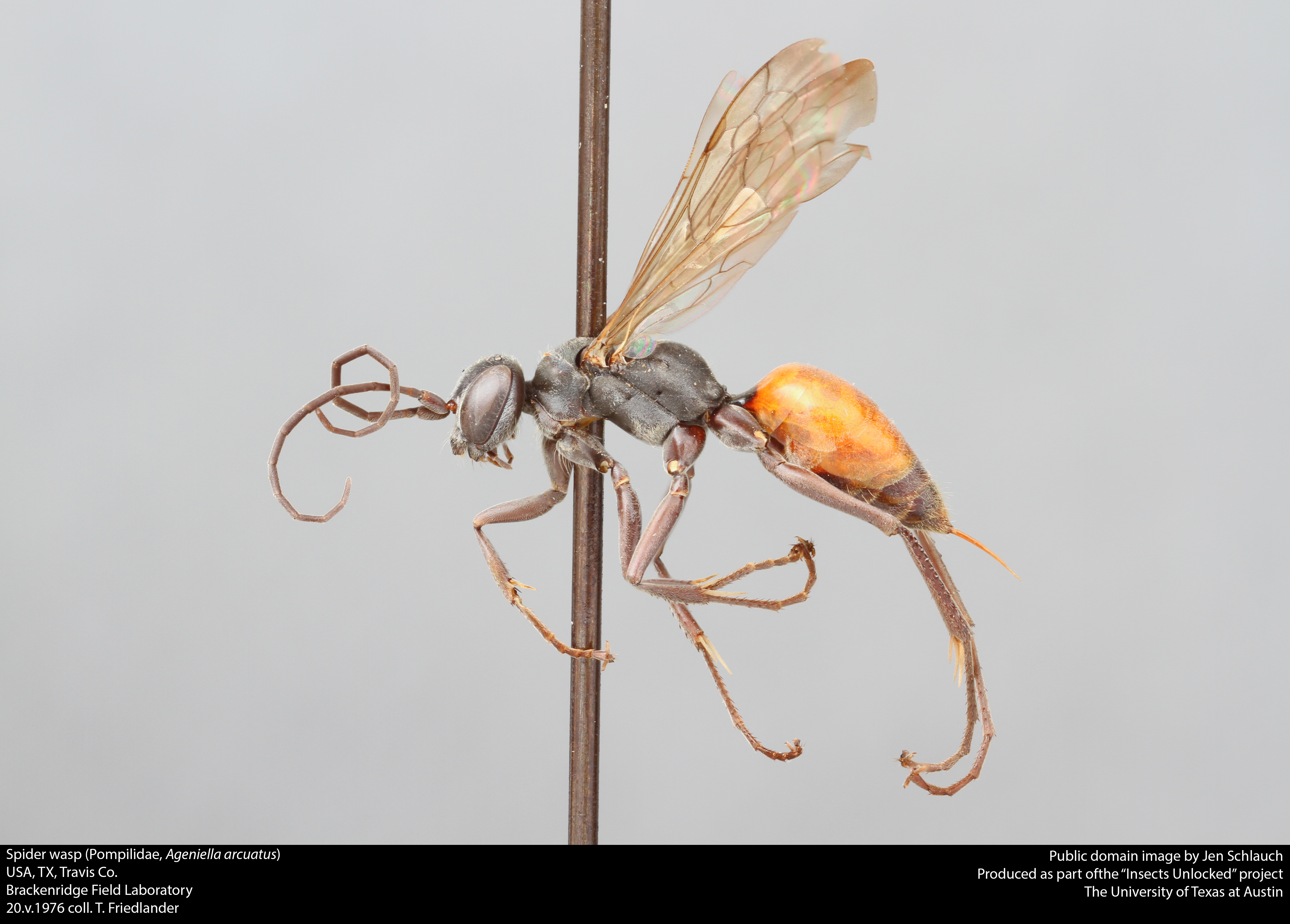
A. arcuata (female)

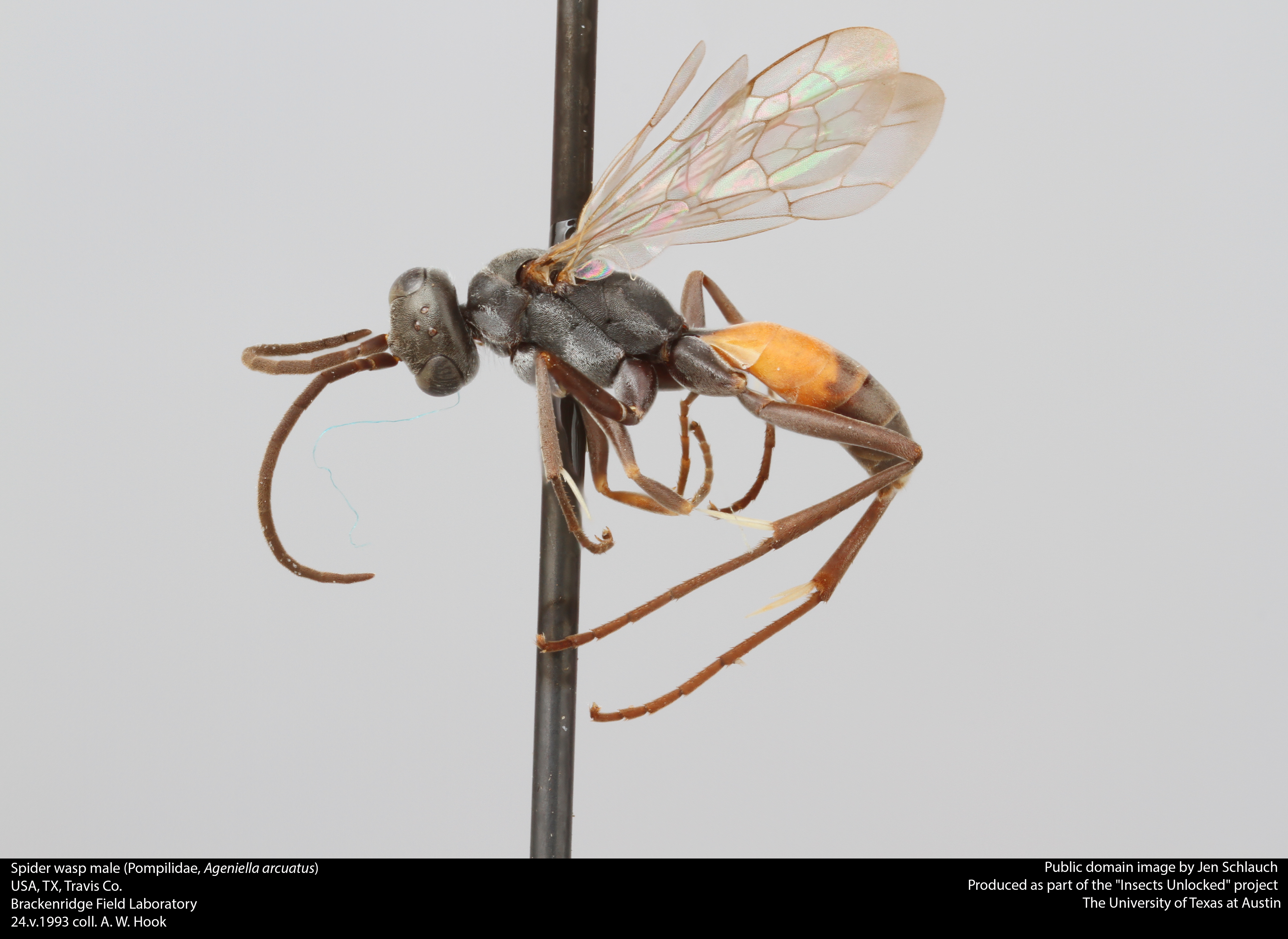
A. arcuata (male)

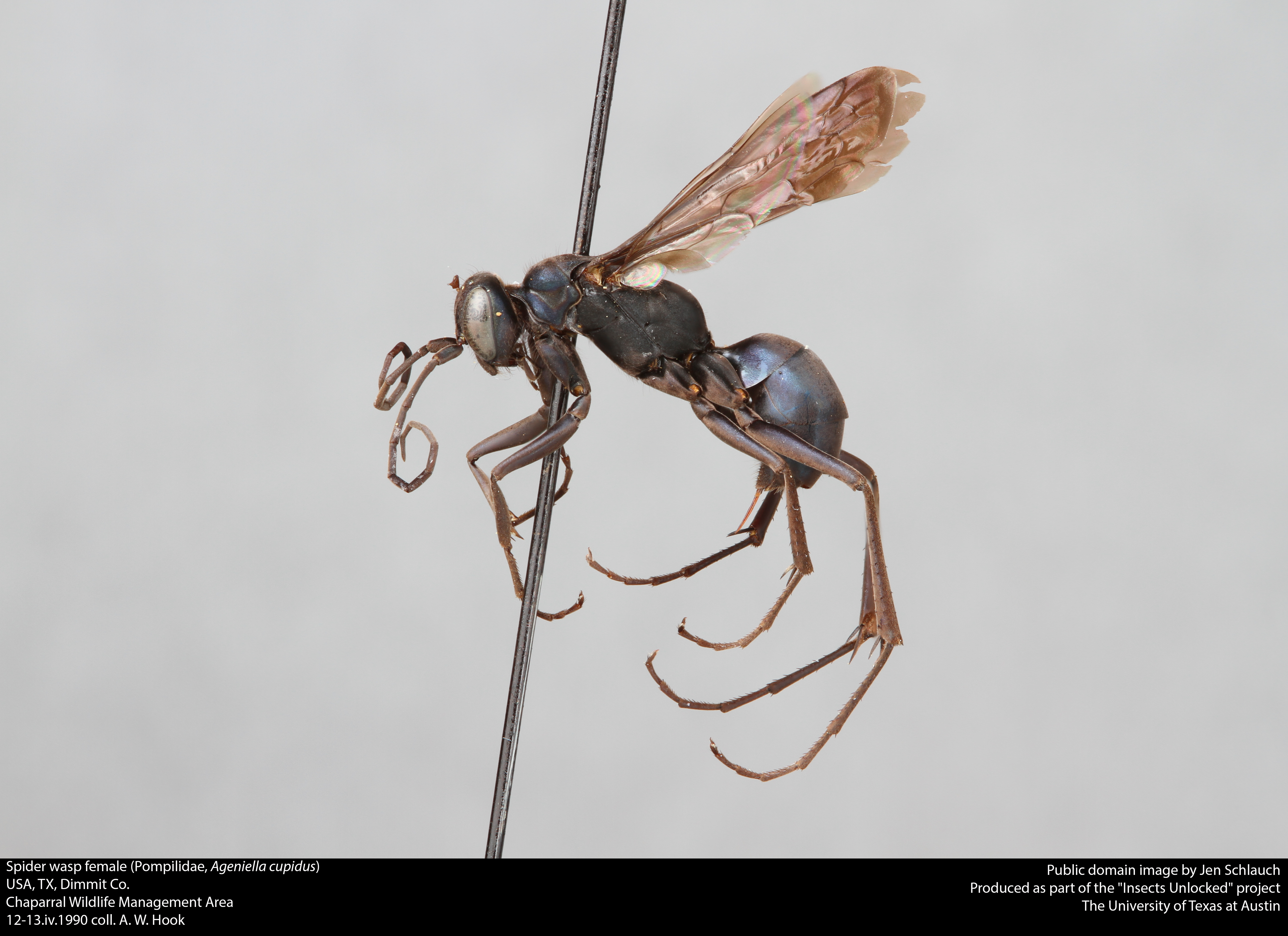
A. cupida (female)

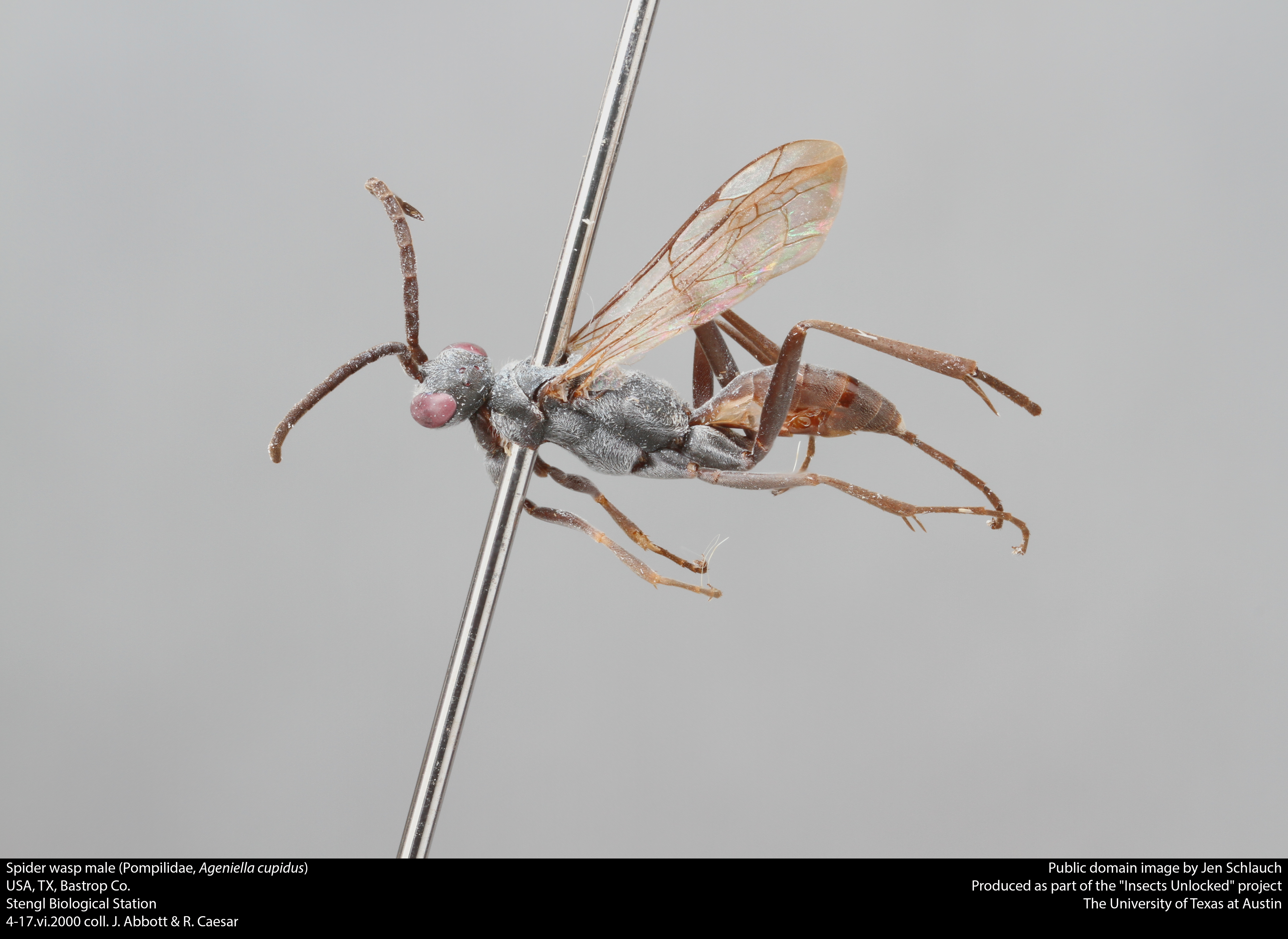
A. cupida (male)

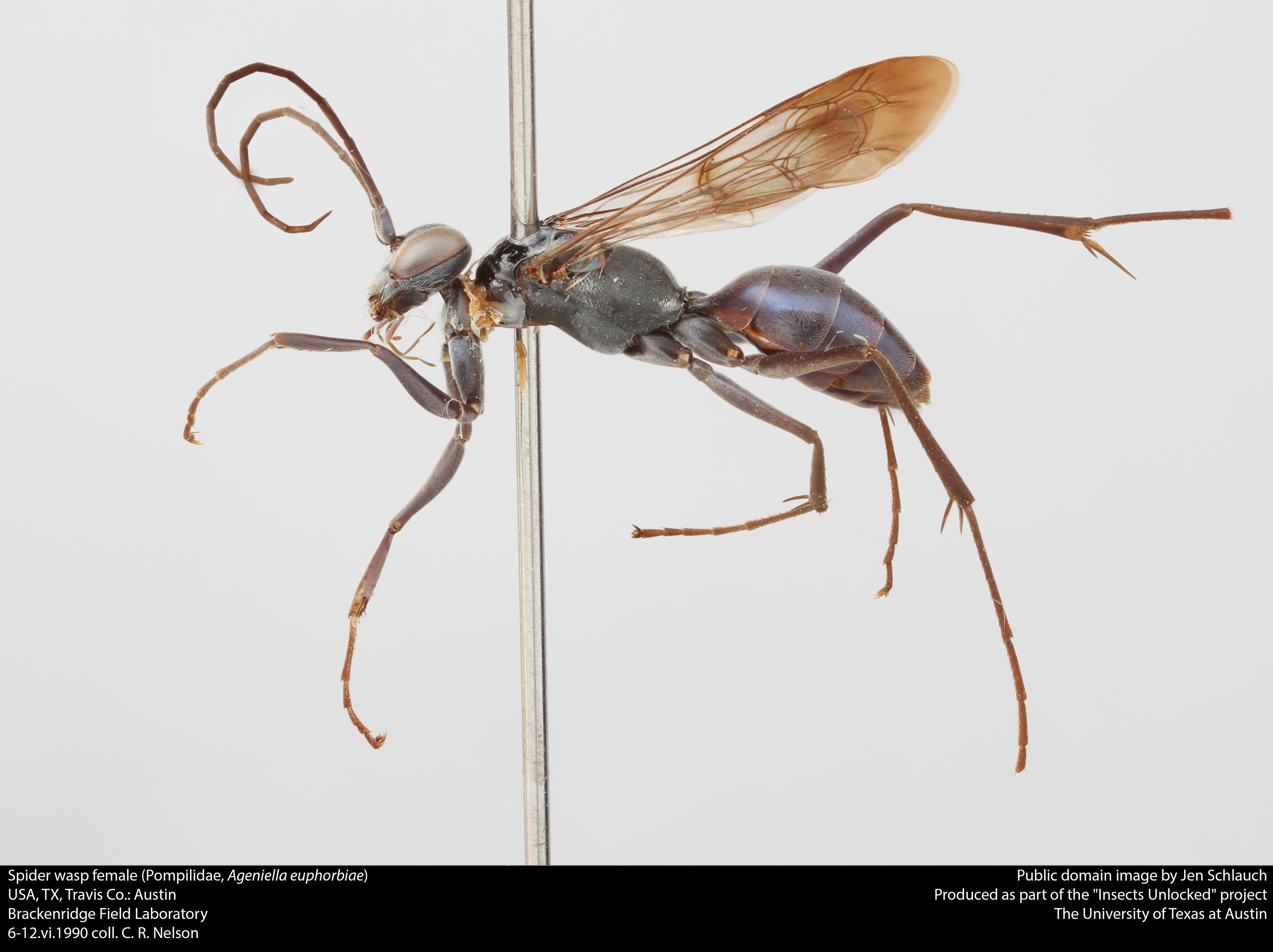
A. euphorbiae (female)

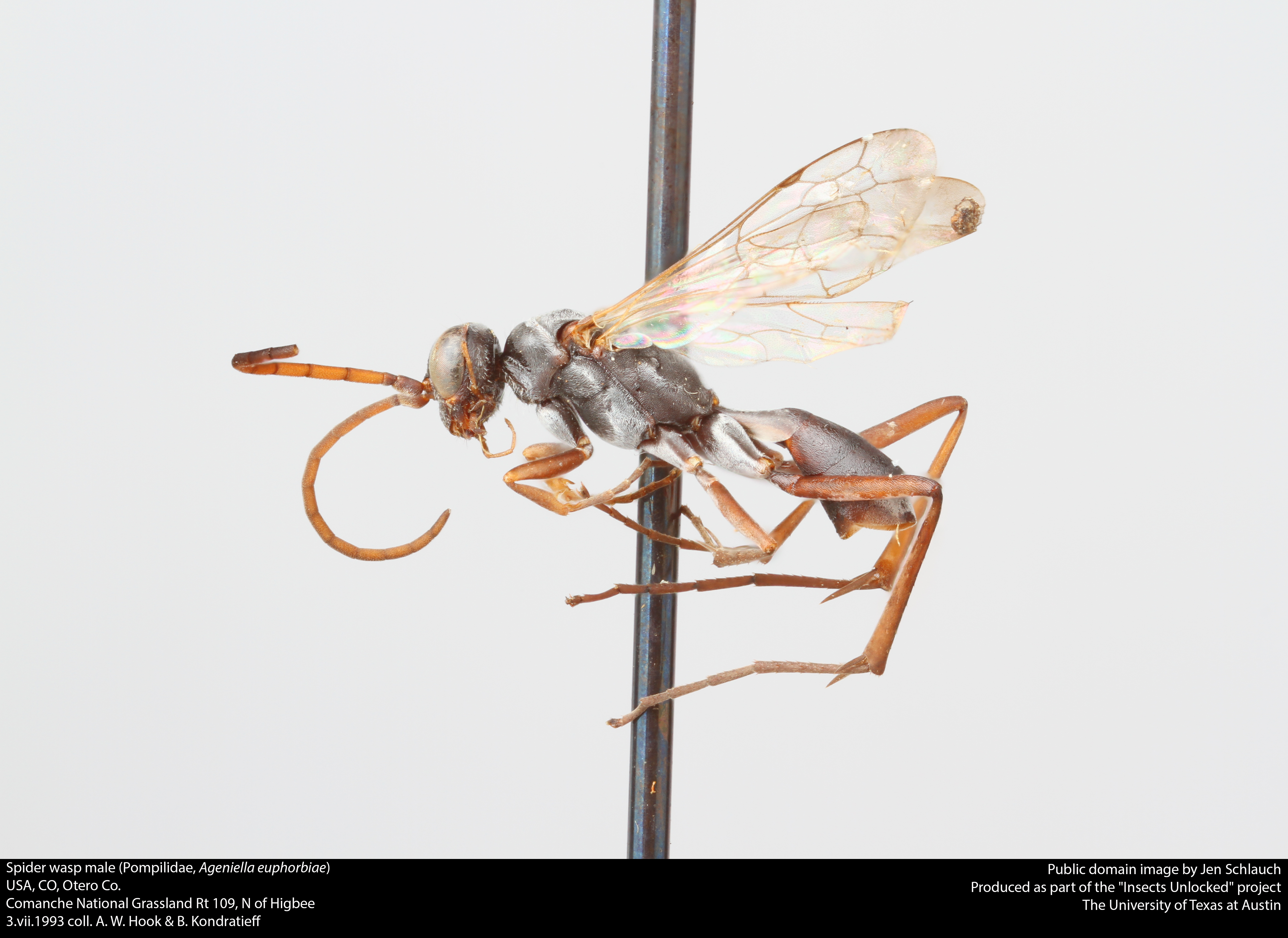
A. euphorbiae (male)

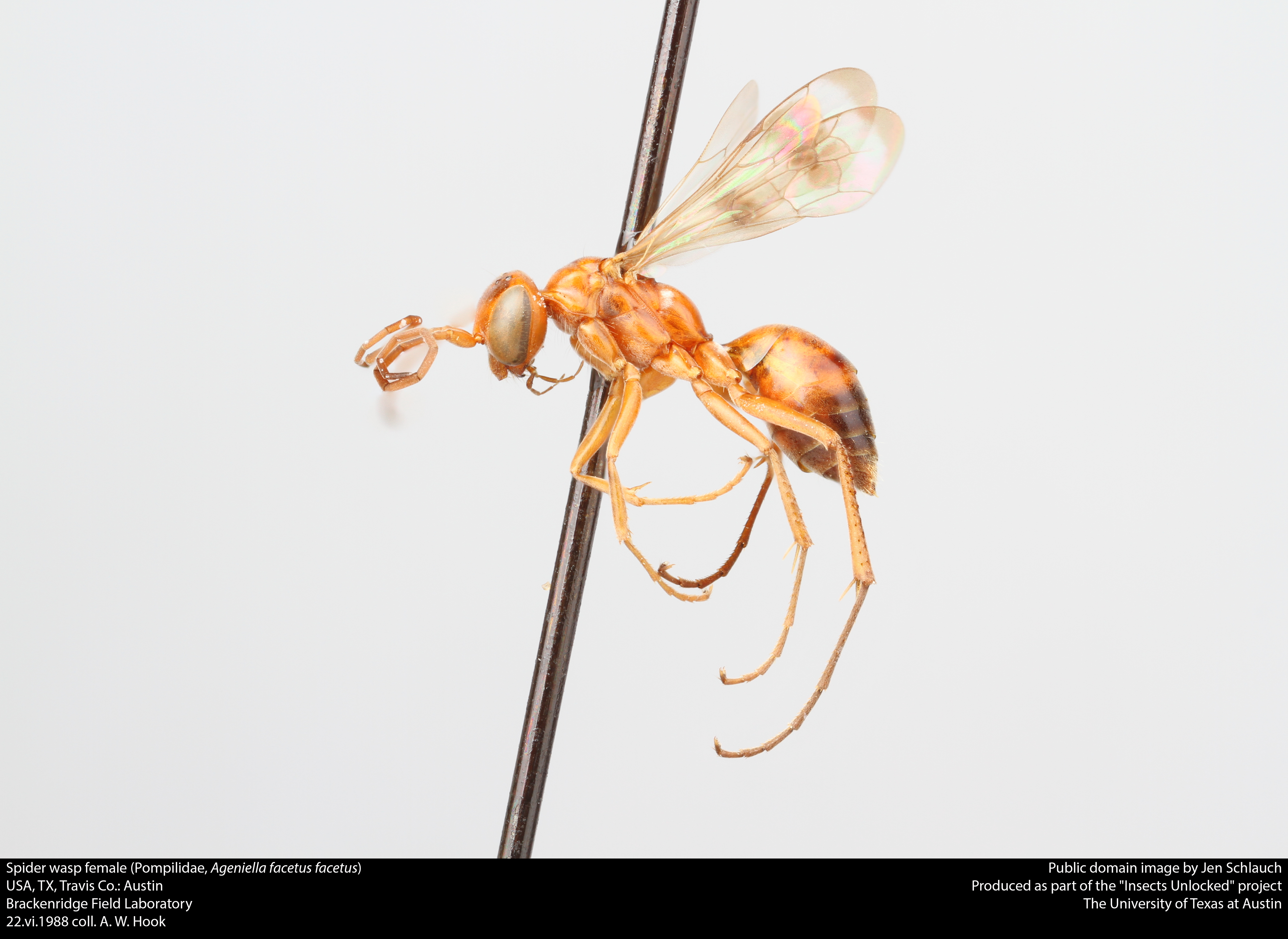
A. faceta faceta (female)

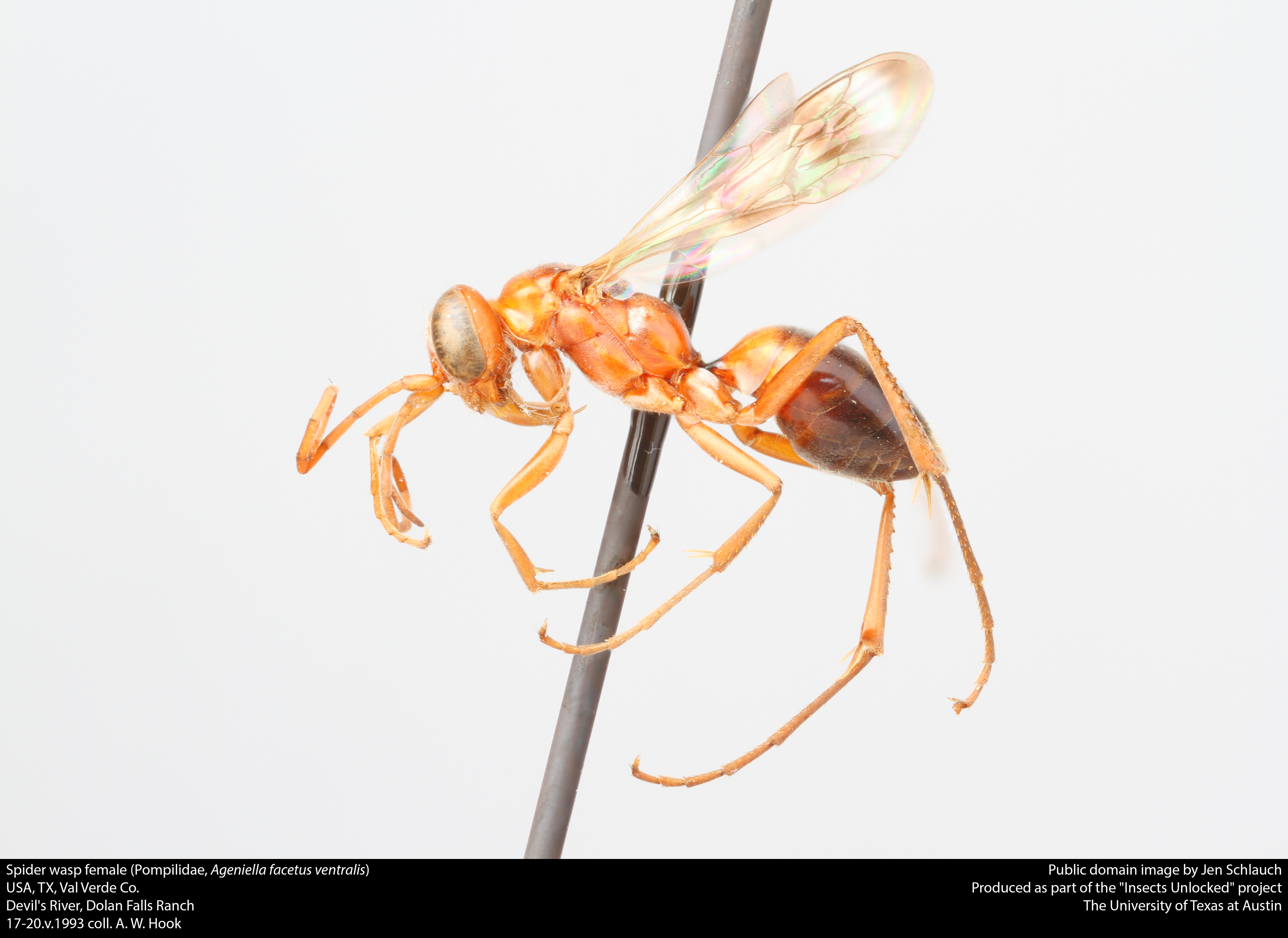
A. faceta ventralis (female)

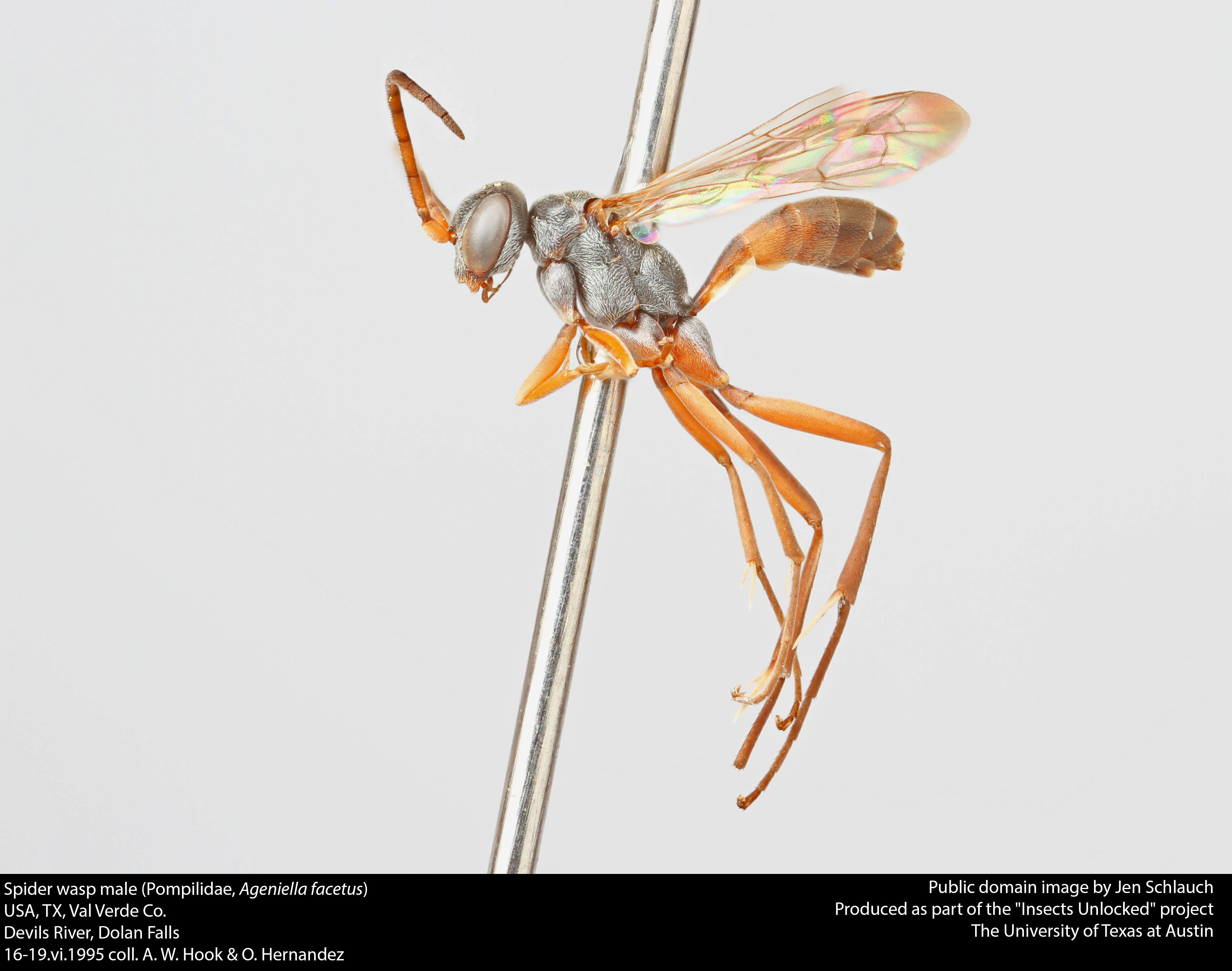
A. faceta (male)

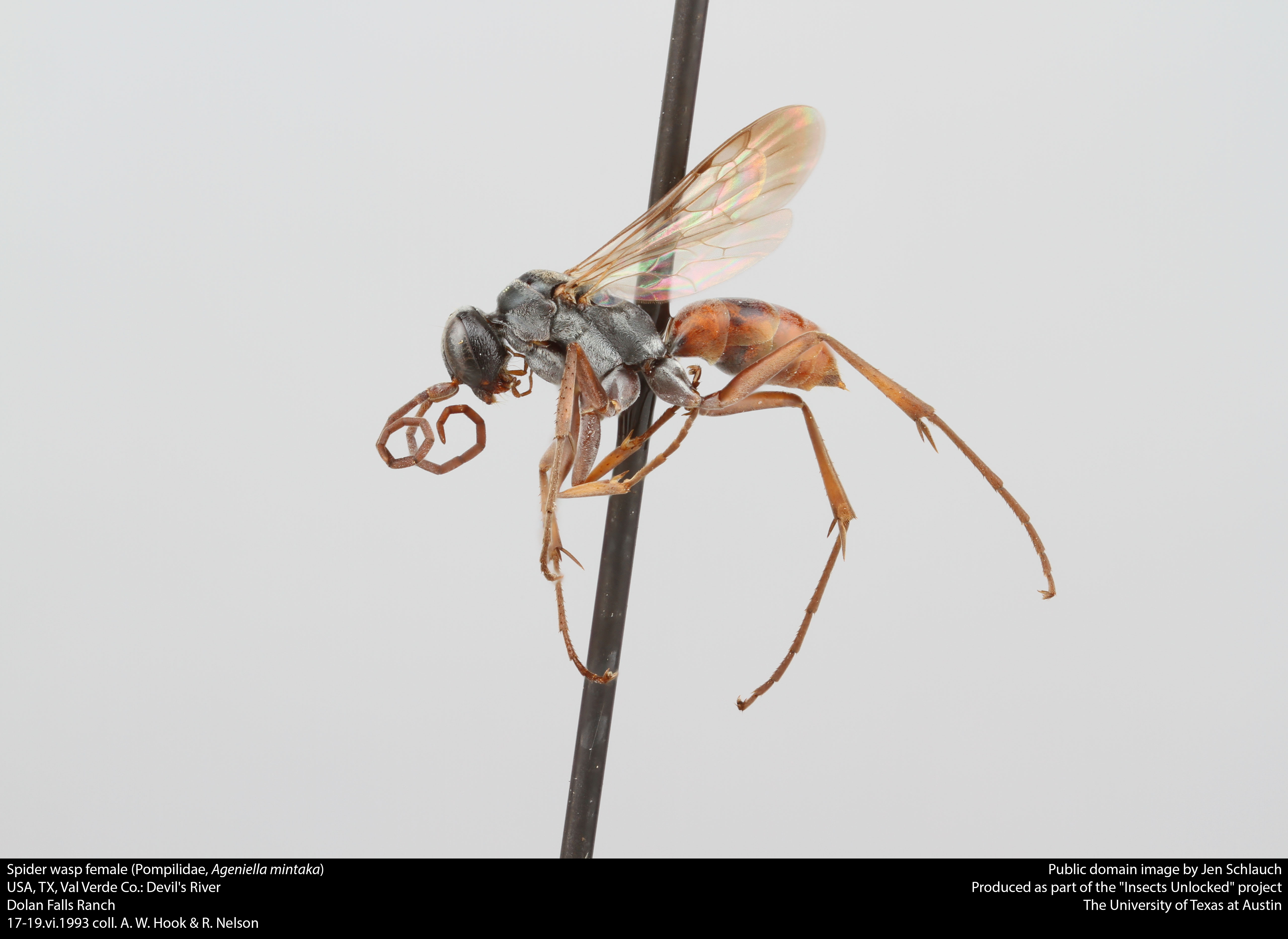
A. mintaka (female)

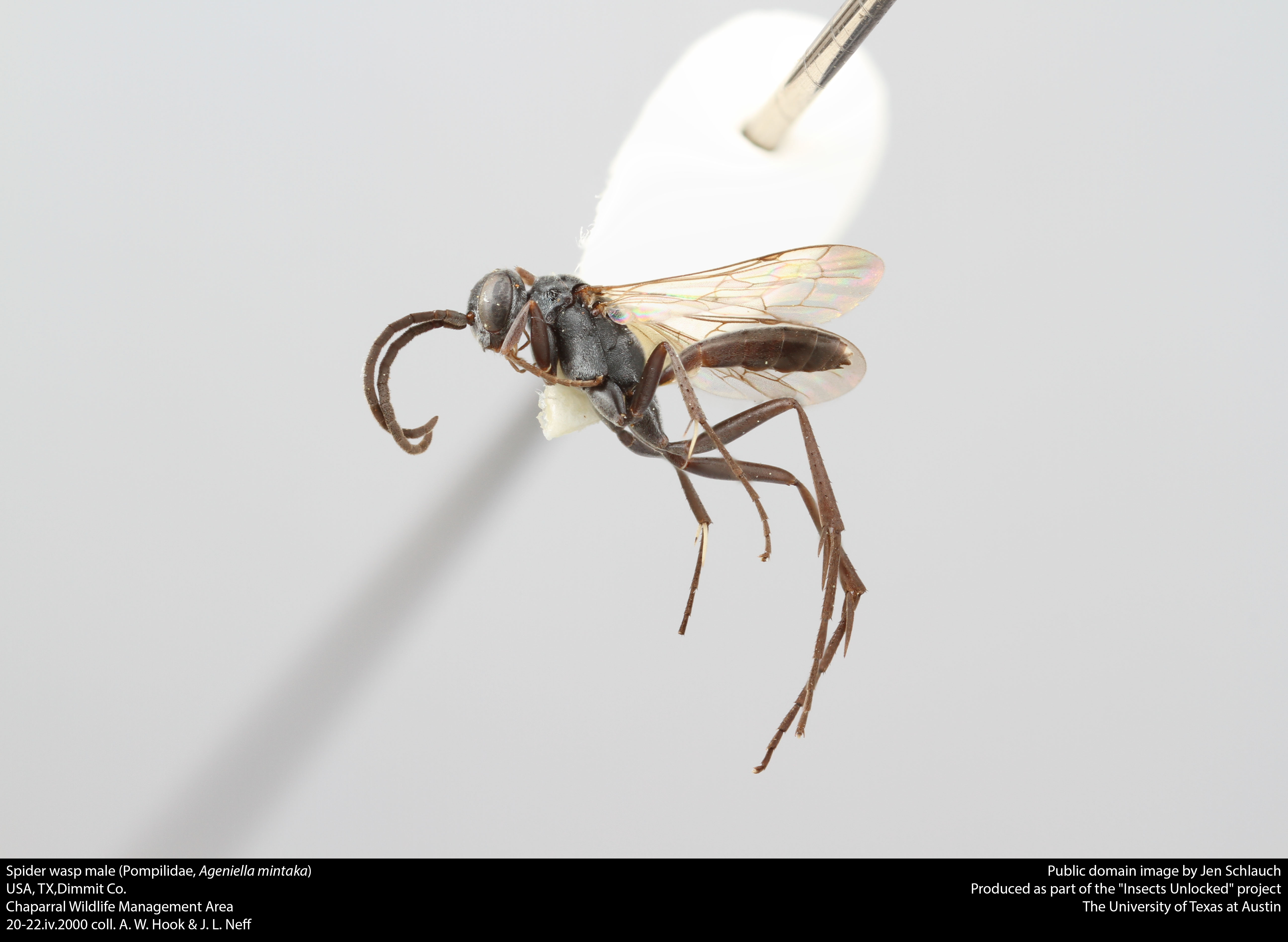
A. mintaka (male)

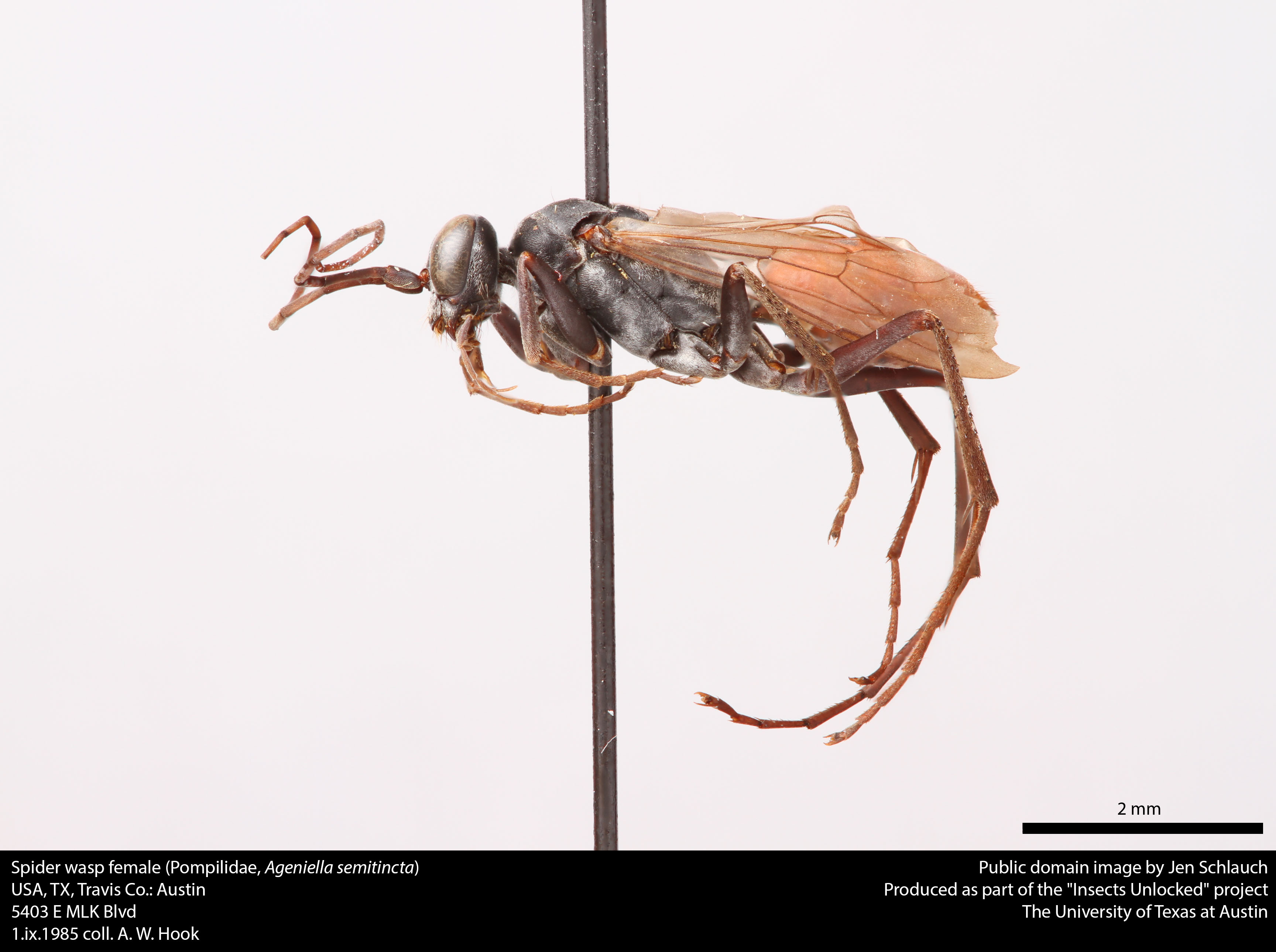
A. semitincta (female)

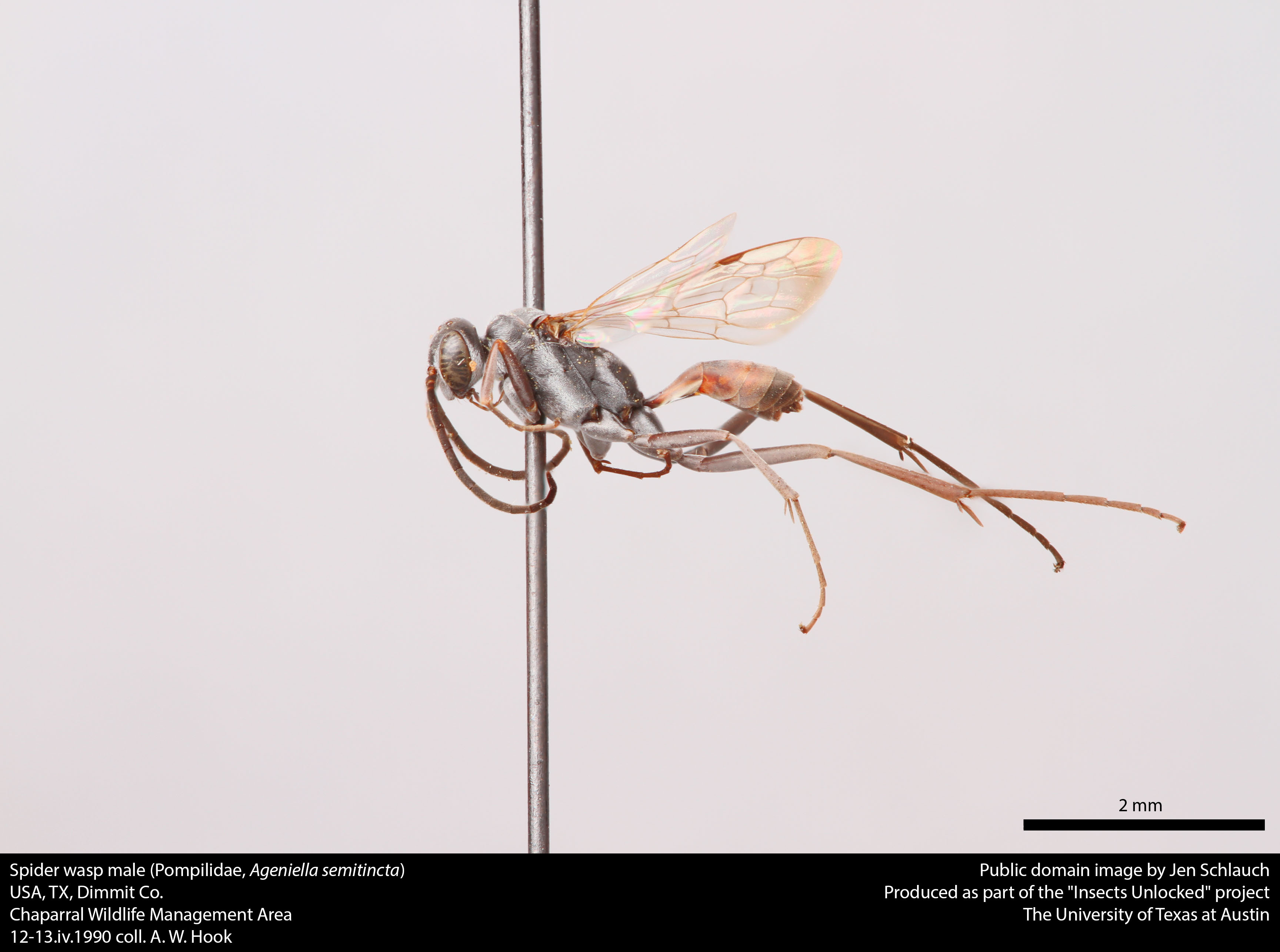
A. semitincta (male)

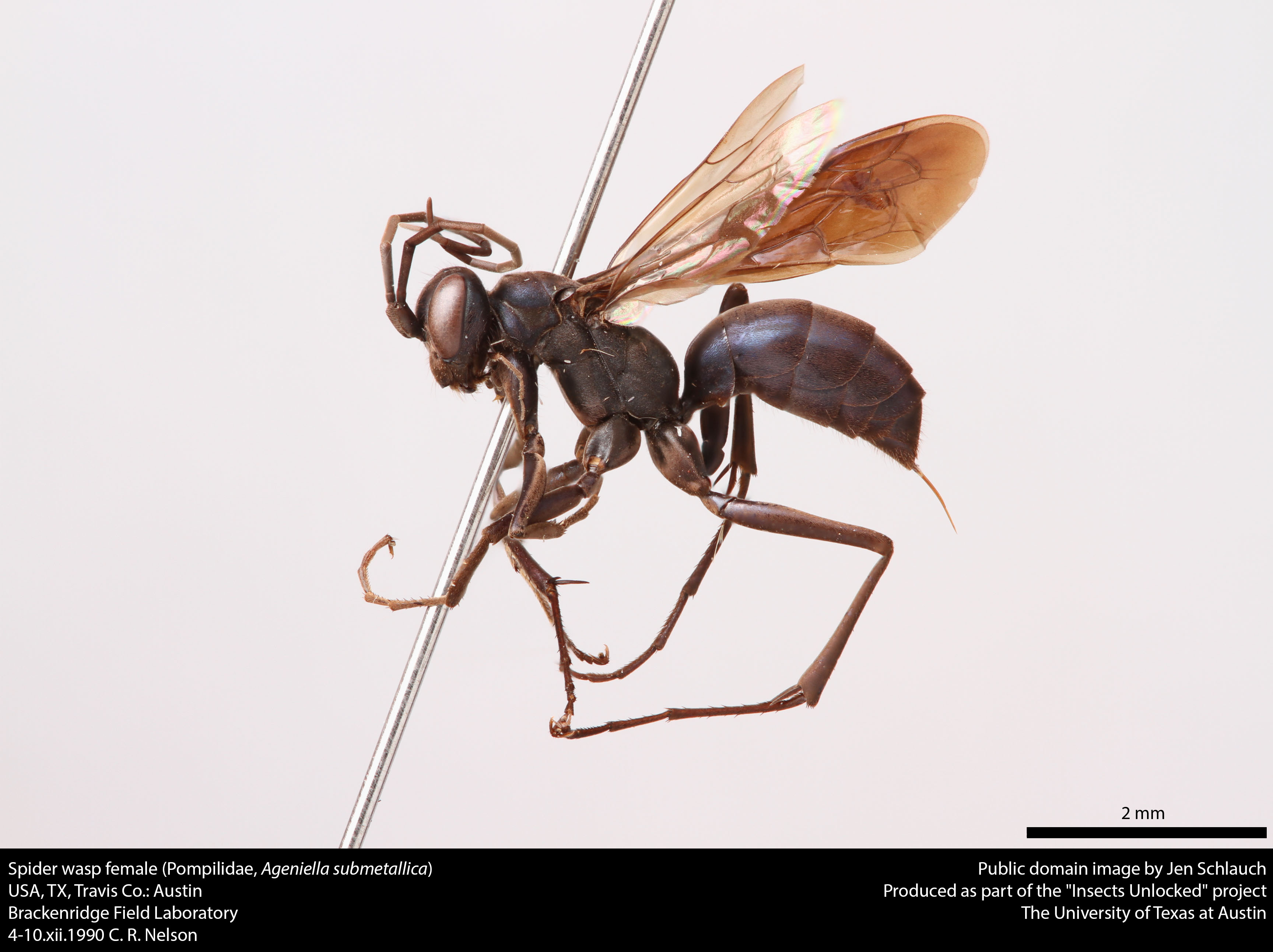
A. submetallica (female)

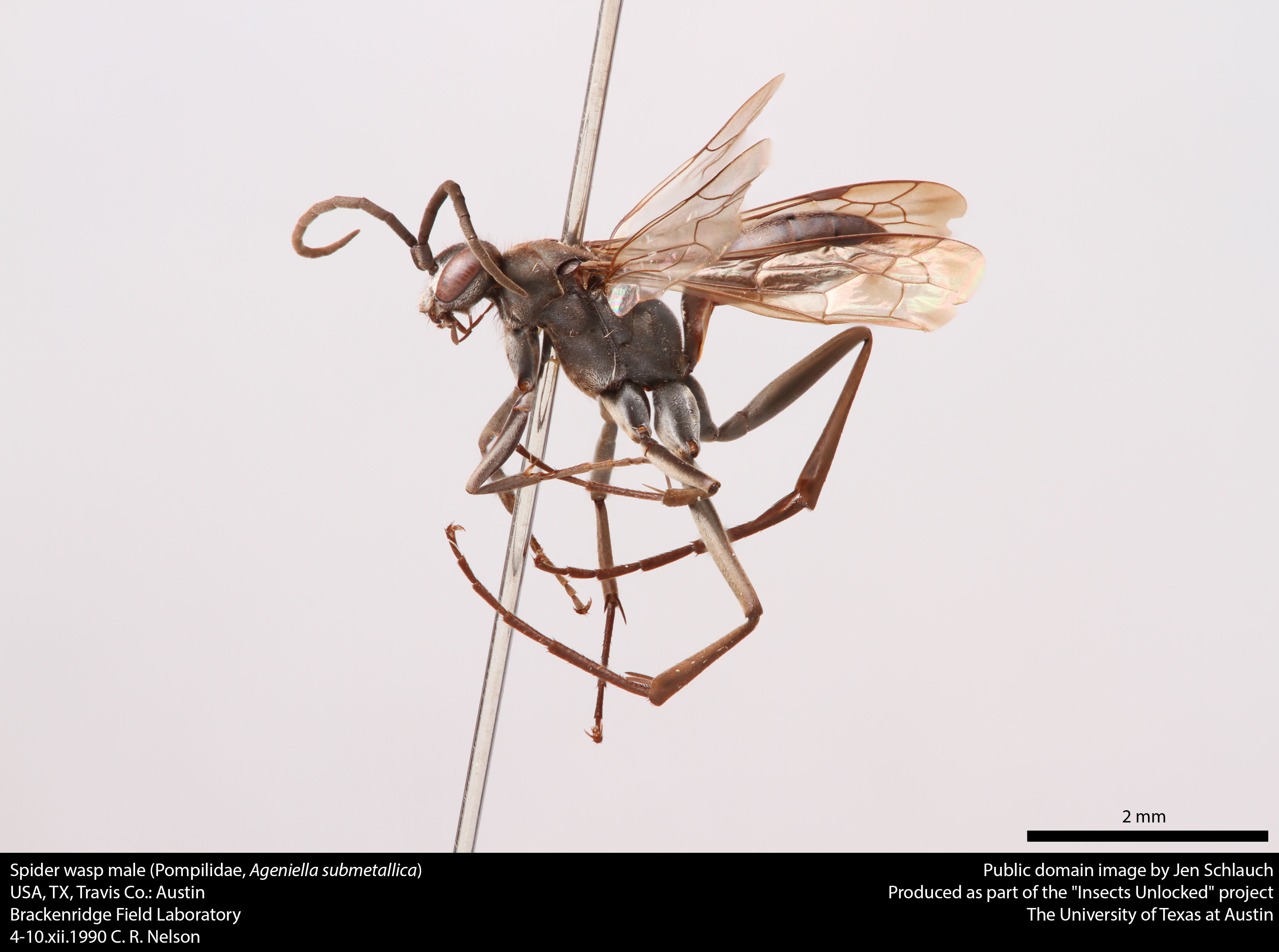
A. submetallica (male)

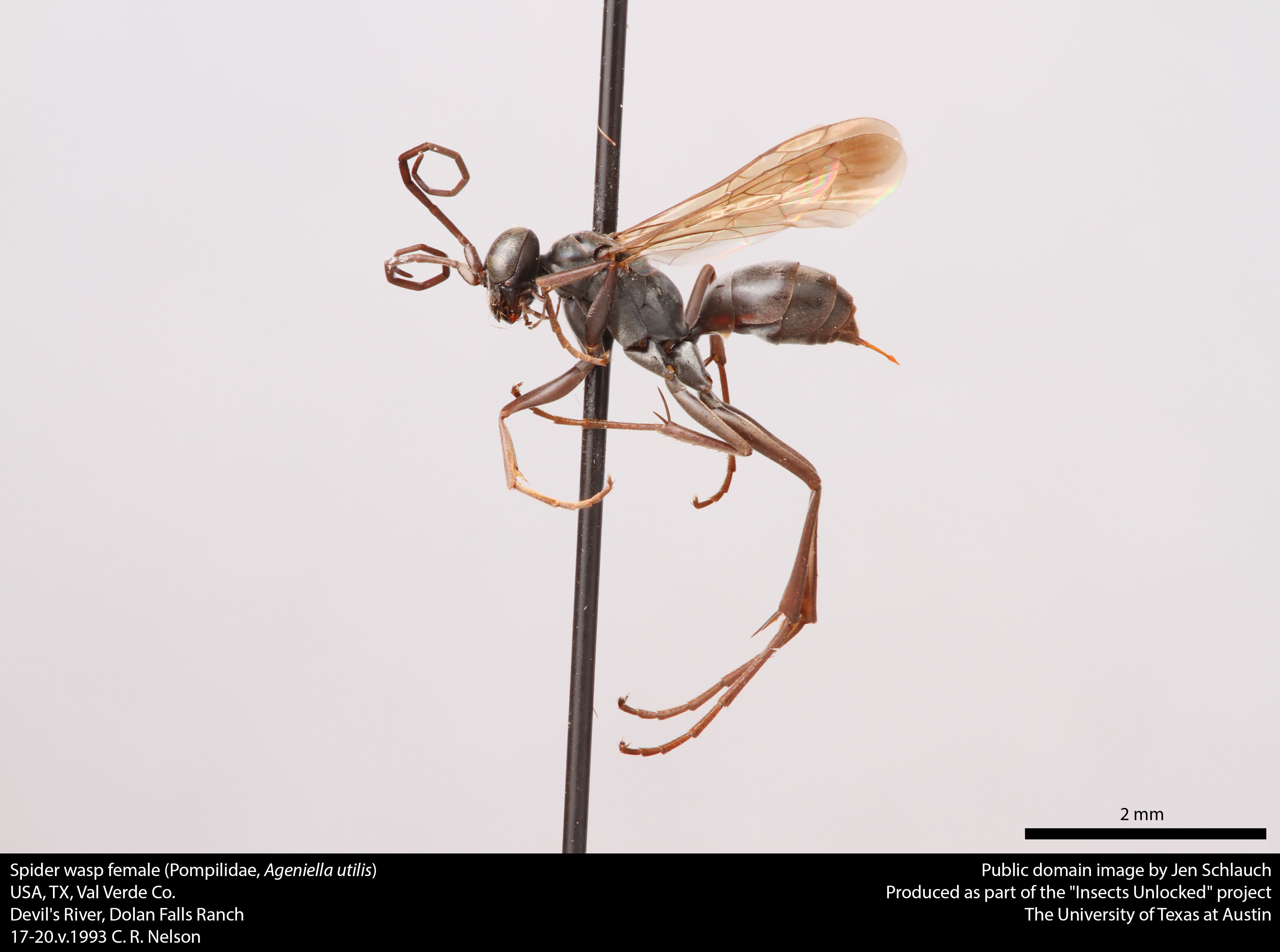
A. utilis (female)

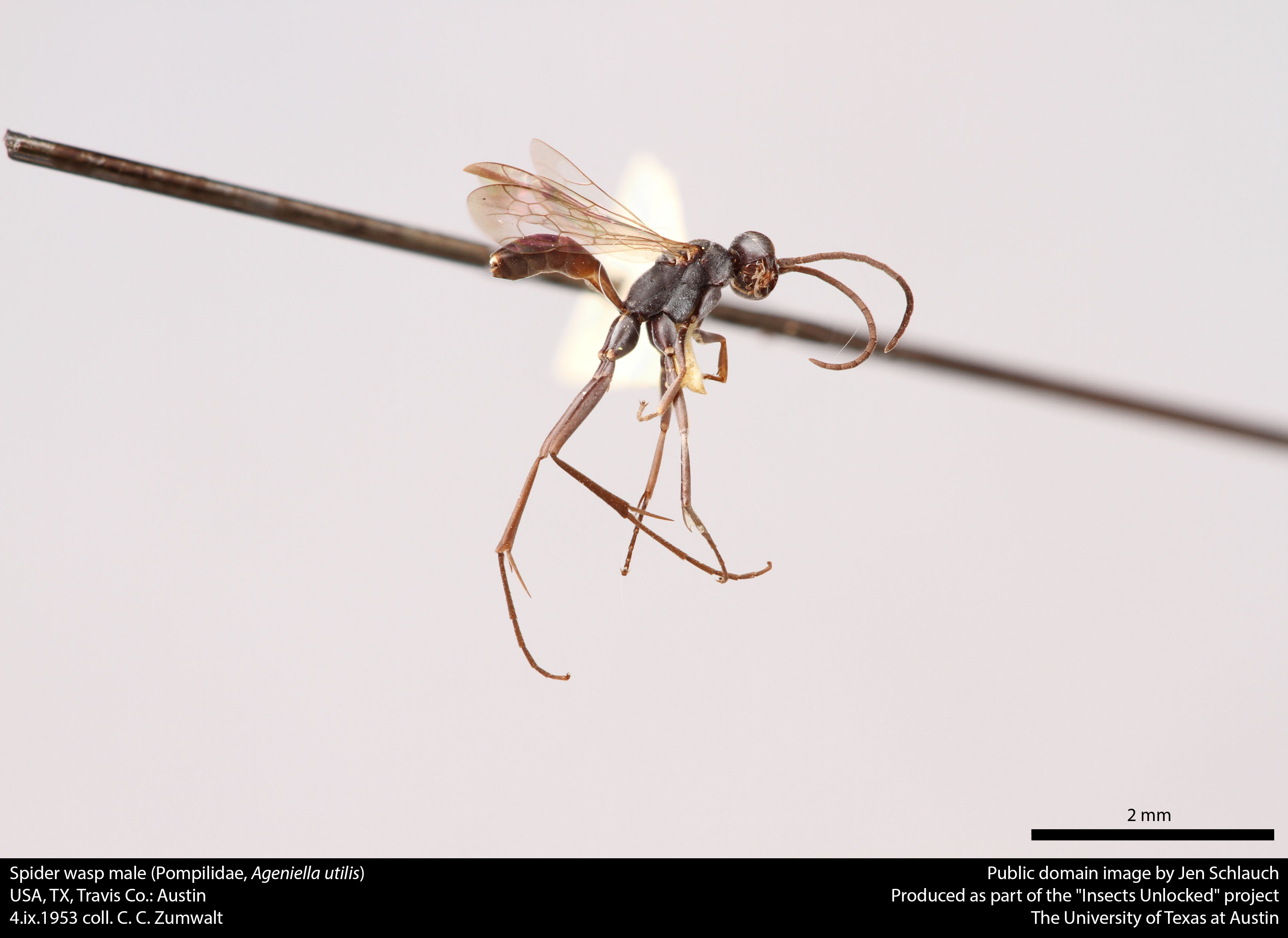
A. utilis (male)
