= Brown huntsman spider =

Brown huntsman spider may refer to:

- Heteropoda venatoria, a pantropical species of spider
- Heteropoda cervina and Heteropoda jugulans, large Australian species of spider
- Other species in the genus Heteropoda
