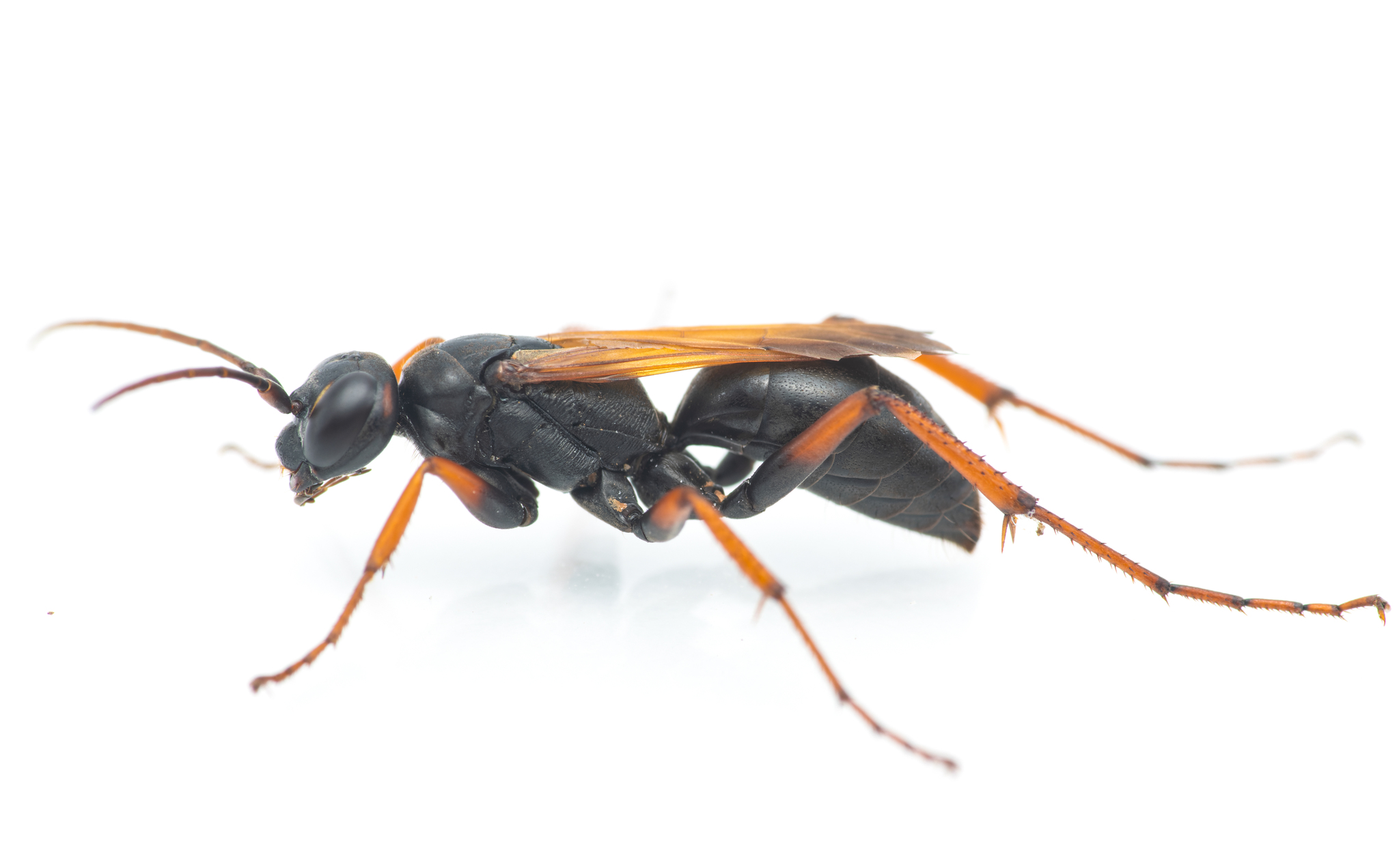
- Cryptocheilus infumatus

Scientific classification
- Kingdom: Animalia
- Phylum: Arthropoda
- Class: Insecta
- Order: Hymenoptera
- Family: Pompilidae
- Tribe: Pepsini
- Genus: Cryptocheilus; Panzer 1806

Type species
- Sphex annulata Fabricius, 1798

Synonyms
- Calicurgus Brullé, 1833; Ceratocnemis Wolf, 1960; Chlorocheilus Wolf, 1965

= Cryptocheilus =

Genus of wasps

Cryptocheilus is a genus of spider wasps of the subfamily Pepsinae, found in the world's warmer regions. They vary in size from medium to large and are often strikingly coloured. The females construct multicellular nests in cavities, once built each cell is stocked with a spider, captured by the female. They are found in open habitats such as heaths, meadows and forest edges.

There are 24 species of Cryptocheilus known from Europe, 6 from North America and 2 recently described from the Neotropics.

== Species ==
Selected species include

- Cryptocheilus albosignatus Sustera, 1924
- Cryptocheilus alternatus (Lepeletier, 1845)
- Cryptocheilus annulatus (Fabricius, 1798)
- Cryptocheilus attenuatus Banks, 1933
- Cryptocheilus bruneipes Haupt, 1962
- Cryptocheilus discolor (Fabricius, 1793)
- Cryptocheilus dusmeti Junco y Reyes, 1943
- Cryptocheilus egregius (Lepeletier, 1845)
- Cryptocheilus elegans (Spinola, 1806)
- Cryptocheilus fabricii (Vander, Linden 1827)
- Cryptocheilus fischeri (Spinola, 1838)
- Cryptocheilus freygessneri (Kohl, 1883)
- Cryptocheilus fulvicollis (Costa, 1874)
- Cryptocheilus gazella Haupt, 1962
- Cryptocheilus guttulatus (Costa, 1887)
- Cryptocheilus hesperus (Banks, 1915)
- Cryptocheilus hispanicus Sustera, 1924
- Cryptocheilus ichneumonoides (Costa, 1874)
- Cryptocheilus idoneus Banks, 1910
- Cryptocheilus infumatus (Palma, 1869)
- Cryptocheilus juncoi Wahis, 1986
- Cryptocheilus limbatus Haupt, 1962
- Cryptocheilus minimus Priesner, 1966
- Cryptocheilus neotropicalis Cambra & Wahis, 2005
- Cryptocheilus notatus (Rossius, 1792)
- Cryptocheilus octomaculatus (Rossius, 1790)
- Cryptocheilus pallidipennis (Banks, 1912)
- Cryptocheilus perezi (Saunders, 1901)
- Cryptocheilus richardsi Moczar, 1953
- Cryptocheilus rubellus (Eversmann, 1846)
- Cryptocheilus sanguinolentus Haupt, 1962
- Cryptocheilus santosi Cambra & Wahis, 2005
- Cryptocheilus severini Banks, 1926
- Cryptocheilus strigifrons Haupt, 1962
- Cryptocheilus terminatus (Say, 1828)
- Cryptocheilus tredecimmaculatus Haupt, 1962
- Cryptocheilus umbrosus Haupt, 1962
- Cryptocheilus unicolor (Fabricius, 1804)
- Cryptocheilus variabilis (Rossius, 1790)
- Cryptocheilus variipennis Sustera, 1924
- Cryptocheilus versicolor (Scopoli, 1763)

=== Select species transferred to Heterodontonyx ===
The classic circumscription of Cryptocheilus was recovered as paraphyletic. Phylogenetic studies have thus split several Australasian species into Heterodontonyx, revived from synonymy under Cryptocheilus.

- Heterodontonyx australis Guerin 1830 - Golden Spider Wasp
- Heterodontonyx bicolor (Fabricius, 1775) - Orange Spider Wasp
