= Heteropoda squamacea =

Scientific classification
- Kingdom: Animalia
- Phylum: Arthropoda
- Subphylum: Chelicerata
- Class: Arachnida
- Order: Araneae
- Infraorder: Araneomorphae
- Family: Sparassidae
- Genus: Heteropoda
- Species: H. squamacea

Binomial name
- Heteropoda squamacea Wang, 1990

Species of spider

Heteropoda squamacea is a species of huntsman spider found in China, described by J. F. Wang in 1990. The species has been erroneously synonymized with Heteropoda venatoria.
