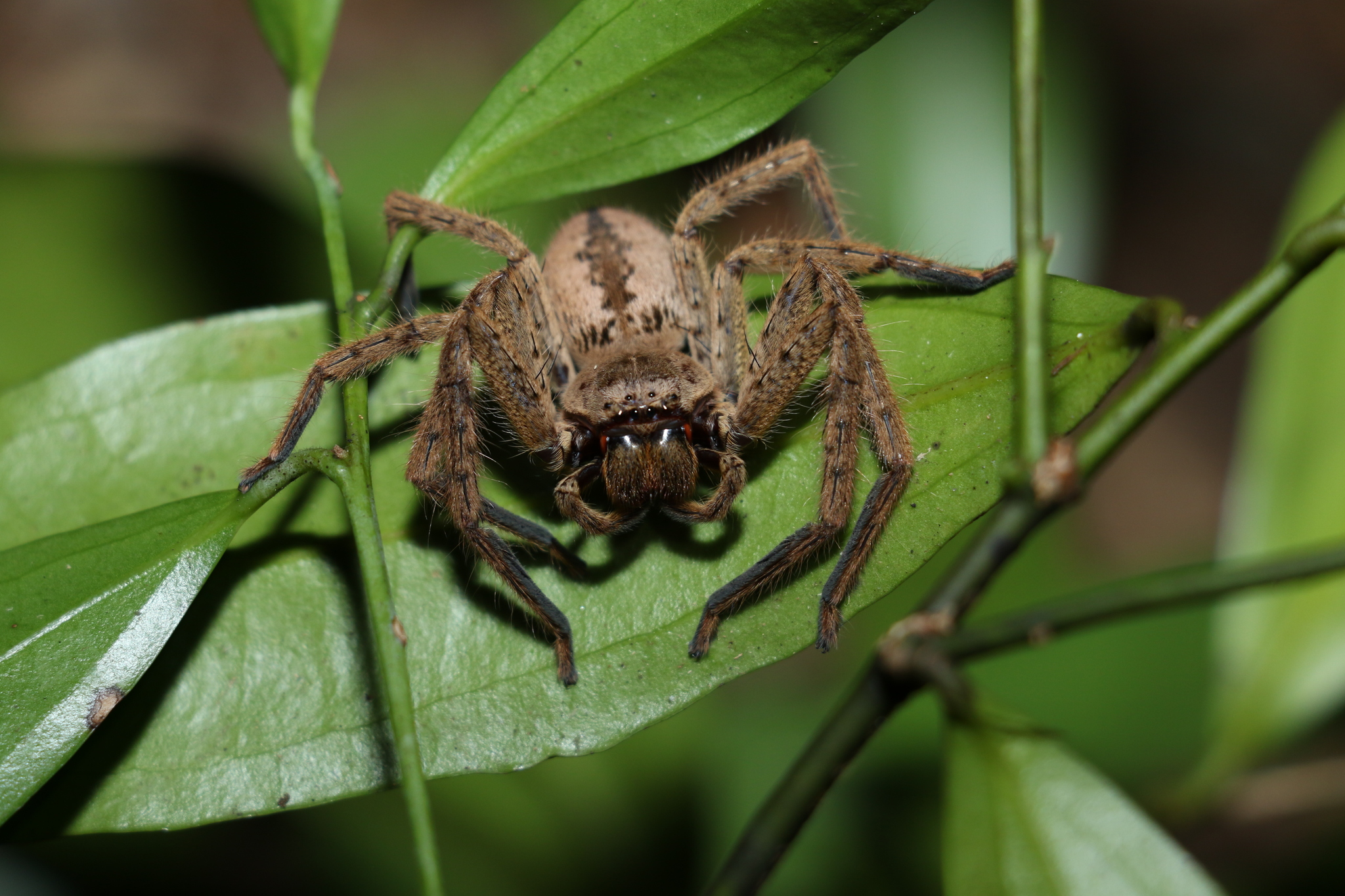
- Fire-back observed near Brisbane

Scientific classification
- Domain: Eukaryota
- Kingdom: Animalia
- Phylum: Arthropoda
- Subphylum: Chelicerata
- Class: Arachnida
- Order: Araneae
- Infraorder: Araneomorphae
- Family: Sparassidae
- Genus: Beregama
- Species: B. cordata

Binomial name
- Beregama cordata (L. Koch, 1875)

Synonyms
- Isopeda cordata L. Koch, 1875

= Beregama cordata =

Species of spider

Beregama cordata, sometimes called the fire-back huntsman, is a species of spider endemic to Queensland and New South Wales, Australia. It is a member of the genus Beregama of huntsman spiders.

== Description ==
This spider was identified thanks largely to the work of D. B. Hirst. It closely resembles Beregama aurea. It also resembles several other Australian huntsman spiders, especially species from the genus Neosparassus, although it lacks the black patch on the underpart of the abdomen which is found on Neosparassus members.
