= Macrinus bambuco =

Scientific classification
- Domain: Eukaryota
- Kingdom: Animalia
- Phylum: Arthropoda
- Subphylum: Chelicerata
- Class: Arachnida
- Order: Araneae
- Infraorder: Araneomorphae
- Family: Sparassidae
- Genus: Macrinus
- Species: M. bambuco

Binomial name
- Macrinus bambuco Rheims, 2010

Species of spider

Macrinus bambuco is a species of giant crab spider in the family Sparassidae. It is found in Colombia.
