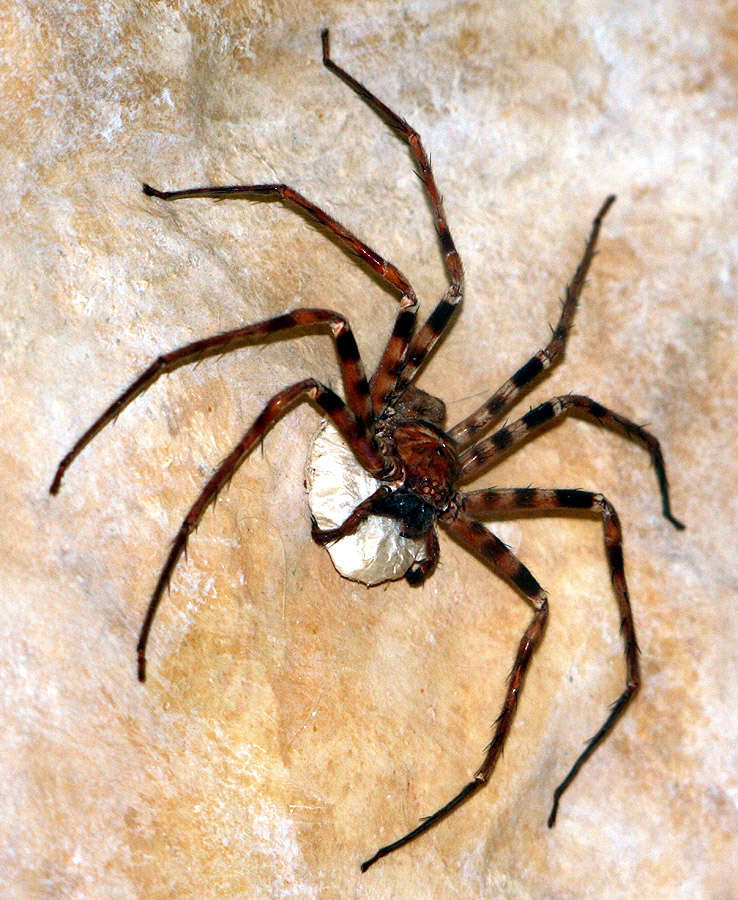
- Giant huntsman protecting her egg sac.

Scientific classification
- Kingdom: Animalia
- Phylum: Arthropoda
- Subphylum: Chelicerata
- Class: Arachnida
- Order: Araneae
- Infraorder: Araneomorphae
- Family: Sparassidae
- Genus: Heteropoda
- Species: H. maxima

Binomial name
- Heteropoda maxima Jäger, 2001

= Giant huntsman spider =

Species of spider

The giant huntsman spider (Heteropoda maxima) is a species of the huntsman spider family Sparassidae found in Laos. It is considered the world's largest spider by leg span, which can reach up to 30 cm (1 ft).

== Description ==
The coloration is yellowish-brown with several irregularly distributed dark spots on the rear half. The legs have wide dark bands before the first bend. Like all huntsman spiders, the legs of the giant huntsman spider are long compared to the body, and twist forward in a crab-like fashion.

Apart from its size, the H. maxima can be distinguished from other species of Heteropoda by genital characteristics. On males, the cymbium is at least three times longer than the tegulum. The female is distinguished by a characteristically shaped epigyneal field with two anterior directed bands, and the course of their internal ducts.

The giant huntsman spider is the largest member of the family Sparassidae, boasting a 30 cm (12 in) leg-span, and 4.6 cm (1.8 in) body-length. The largest known member of the Sparassidae known prior to the discovery of H. maxima was the Australian Beregama aurea (L. Koch, 1875) with a body length of about 4 cm (1.6 in). (Other relatively large members of Sparassidae have been discovered in recent years, including Cerbalus aravaensis, the largest in the Middle East).

== Taxonomy and naming ==
Heteropoda maxima was first described in 2001 by Peter Jäger, after being discovered in a cave in Laos. Over a thousand new species of plant and animal were found between 1997 and 2007 in the Greater Mekong Subregion.

A representative of the World Wide Fund for Nature stated that "some of these species really have no business being recently discovered", suggesting that it is surprising for such a large species to go undiscovered for so long.

== Distribution and habitat ==
The giant huntsman spider is found in Laos, and is believed to be a cave dweller because of its pale colour, long legs and special hairs on the second foot of the male. There is no apparent reduction of the eyes, possibly because the species lives near cave entrances.

== Cannibalism ==
Florian and Diana Schnös discovered cannibalism within the species of giant huntsman spiders in a cave near Vang Vieng in Laos. Female individuals may eat male individuals after mating, a characteristic more commonly associated with the genus Latrodectus, the true widows, although it is considered normal spider behavior.

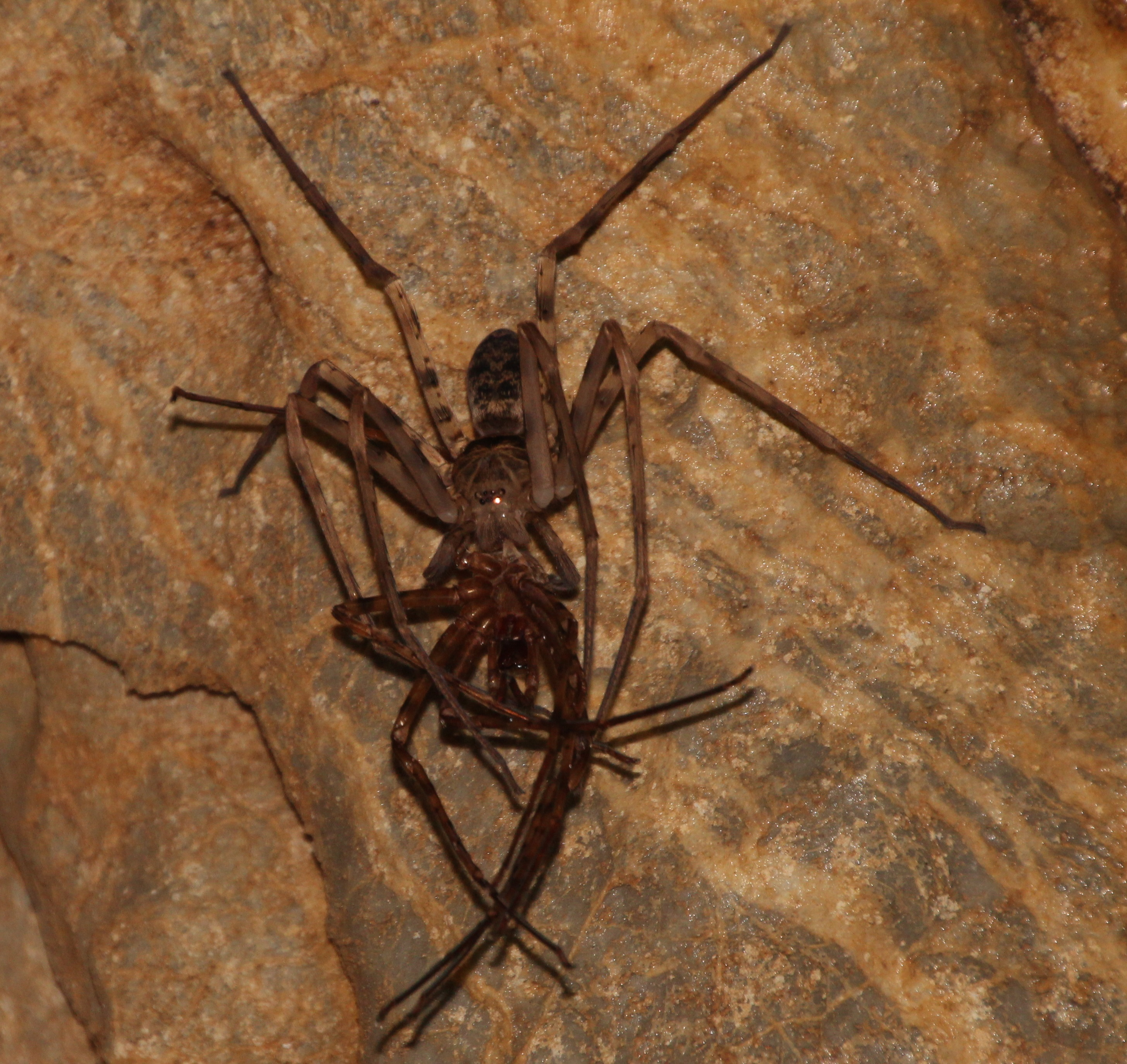
Female giant huntsman spider eating male

== See also ==
- Goliath birdeater (Theraphosa blondi), largest known spider in the world by mass
- Mongolarachne jurassica, the largest known fossilized spider
- Cerbalus aravaensis, a huntsman spider found in Israel and Jordan
