= Cryptocheilus notatus =

Scientific classification
- Domain: Eukaryota
- Kingdom: Animalia
- Phylum: Arthropoda
- Class: Insecta
- Order: Hymenoptera
- Family: Pompilidae
- Genus: Cryptocheilus
- Species: C. notatus

Binomial name
- Cryptocheilus notatus (Rossi, 1792)

Synonyms
- Calicurgus apricus Lepeletier, 1845; Calicurgus melanius Lepeletier, 1845; Cryptocheilus affinis (Vander Linden, 1827); Cryptocheilus notatum (Rossi, 1792); Cryptocheilus orientalis (Haupt); Cryptocheilus stygium Priesner, 1967; Cryptocheilus subnotatus (Junco, 1943); Cryptochilus affinis Vander Linden, 1827; Cryptochilus anthracinus Haupt; Cryptochilus fuliginatur Haupt; Cryptochilus notatus (Rossi, 1792); Cryptochilus orientalis (Haupt, 1927); Pompilus affinis Vander Linden, 1827; Pompilus gutta Spinola, 1808; Pompilus iracundus Dufour, 1841; Pompilus rogenhoferi Radoszkowski, 1887; Priocnemis binotatus Marquet, 1879; Priocnemis notatus (Rossi, 1792); Salius marquetii Dalla Torre, 1897; Sphex notata Rossi, 1792; Sphex notatus Rossi, 1792

Species of wasp

Cryptocheilus notatus is the largest species of spider wasps (Pompilidae) to be found in Great Britain reaching up to 18 mm in length.

== Biology ==
Cryptocheilus notatus constructs multi-celled nests and they require quite substantial pre-existing cavities, the wasp does very little digging herself. Nesting sites have included mammal burrows, notably those of the European Mole (Talpa europaea), but it will utilise disused invertebrate nest sites, which it will expand.

Prey recorded in Britain includes Drassodes cupreus, a large nocturnal ground spider from the Gnaphosidae.

== Habitat ==
Associated with woodland edges. In Britain, it is associated with warm lowland heaths.

== Distribution ==
Europe and the Middle East. In Britain, it is only found in the southern heathlands from Kent west to Cornwall, with concentrations in Surrey and Hampshire. In Europe has been recorded in Spain, France, Belgium, Netherlands, Switzerland, Italy, Germany and Poland. It has also been found in Turkey, east to Iran and Central Asia.
