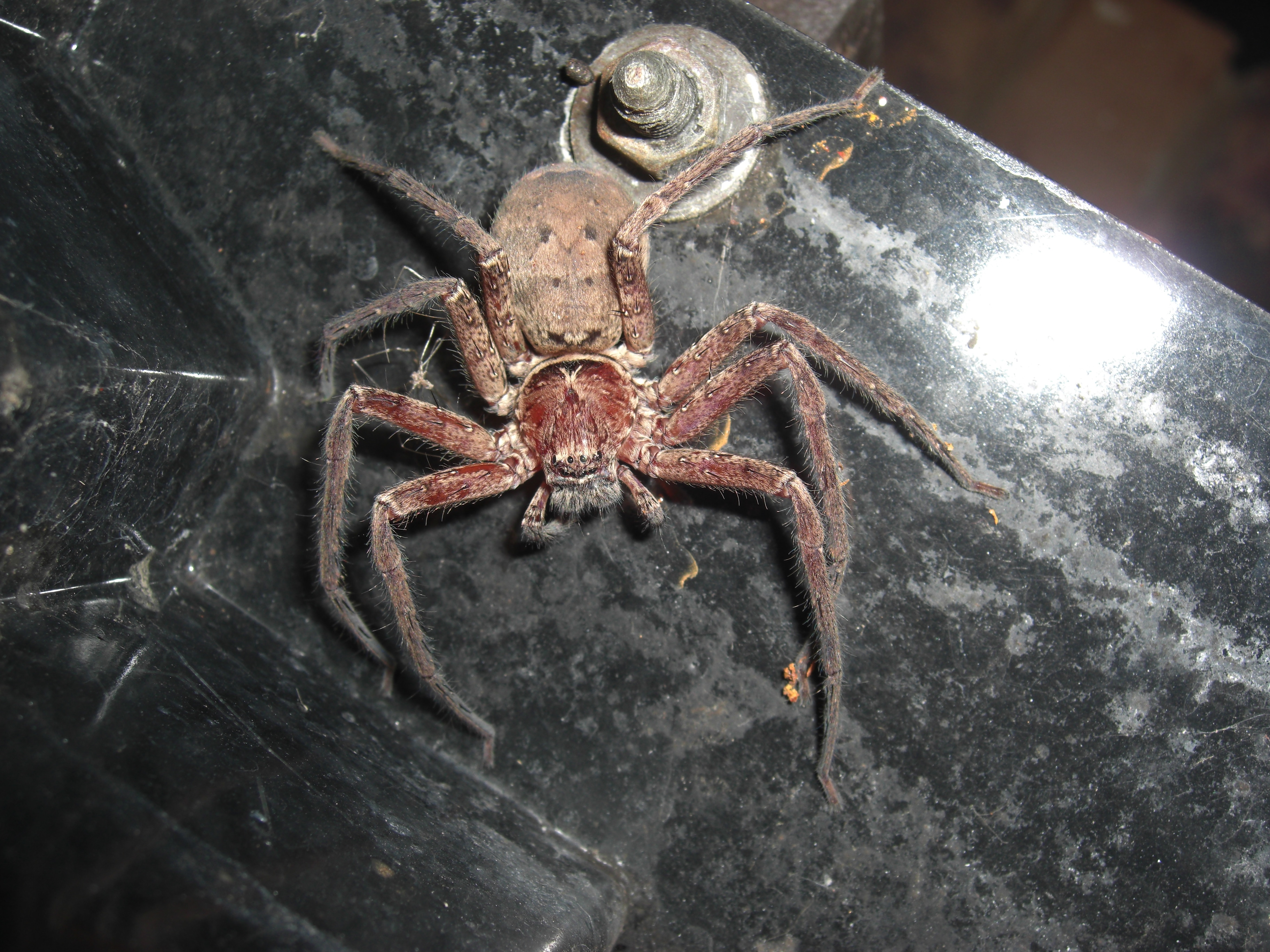
- Heteropoda cervina

Scientific classification
- Kingdom: Animalia
- Phylum: Arthropoda
- Subphylum: Chelicerata
- Class: Arachnida
- Order: Araneae
- Infraorder: Araneomorphae
- Family: Sparassidae
- Genus: Heteropoda
- Species: H. cervina

Binomial name
- Heteropoda cervina L. Koch, 1875

Synonyms
- Heteropoda keyserlingi Hogg, 1903

= Heteropoda cervina =

Species of spider

Heteropoda cervina, commonly called the brown huntsman, is a large species of spider in the family Sparassidae often found in leaf litter in central Queensland, Australia. The species was first described by Ludwig Carl Christian Koch in 1875 as Sarotes cervinus.

Heteropoda cervina shelters under bark or other dark places during the day, emerging in the evening to find prey, often on tree trunks. These spiders are also known to enter houses, though they are extremely timid, and their bite – while painful – is only mildly toxic. Their unequally sized legs, after which the genus is named, are splayed to the side allowing very fast sideways movement and abrupt change of direction. They have strong, curved fangs, a flattened body and two rows of four eyes. Males and females look alike, females larger. Females lay their eggs in large "cocoons". Heteropoda cervina is very similar in appearance to the related species Heteropoda jugulans. There has been a great deal of confusion regarding this species, because of a misidentification of Heteropoda jugulans as Heteropoda cervina by Ramon Mascord (1970, 1980) perpetuated by other authors.
