= Neosparassus diana =

- Adult male

Scientific classification
- Kingdom: Animalia
- Phylum: Arthropoda
- Subphylum: Chelicerata
- Class: Arachnida
- Order: Araneae
- Infraorder: Araneomorphae
- Family: Sparassidae
- Genus: Neosparassus
- Species: N. diana

Binomial name
- Neosparassus diana (L.Koch, 1875)

Synonyms
- Heteropoda diana L. Koch, 1875; Sarotes diana Simon, 1880; Neosparassus diana Hogg, 1903; Olios diana Hickman, 1967

Species of spider

Neosparassus diana, or the badge huntsman, is a huntsman spider native to Australia. The common name is sometimes applied to other species in the genus. N. diana is the type species of the genus.

== Distribution and habitat ==
N. diana are found throughout Australia, although they are most common in the south-east (Tasmania, Victoria, South Australia, and New South Wales), and south-west Western Australia. They are commonly found under loose bark and in small crevices.

== Appearance ==
Ventral view of adult male, showing distinctive black and white "badge" marking on abdomen

Like all huntsmans, the body is flattened, although to a lesser degree than in most huntsman species. Body length can be up to 20 mm in females and 16 mm in males. The front two pairs of legs are markedly longer than the back two pairs. Colour of body and legs ranges from light brown to orange to fawn, with dark brown, yellow, and white speckles on the body and legs. There is a distinctive black marking with two white spots on the underside of the abdomen; this is the "badge" referenced in their common name.

== Behaviour ==
N. diana are active at night, and, like all huntsmans, hunt for prey rather than making a web. They are not aggressive towards humans and will rarely bite, even when handled. Bites may be painful but only cause temporary, localised symptoms.
