= Cryptocheilus elegans =

Scientific classification
- Domain: Eukaryota
- Kingdom: Animalia
- Phylum: Arthropoda
- Class: Insecta
- Order: Hymenoptera
- Family: Pompilidae
- Genus: Cryptocheilus
- Species: C. elegans

Binomial name
- Cryptocheilus elegans (Spinola, 1806)

Species of wasp

Cryptocheilus elegans is a species of spider wasp in the genus Cryptocheilus found in Europe.
