= Macrinus (spider) =

Scientific classification
- Kingdom: Animalia
- Phylum: Arthropoda
- Subphylum: Chelicerata
- Class: Arachnida
- Order: Araneae
- Infraorder: Araneomorphae
- Family: Sparassidae
- Genus: Macrinus; Simon, 1887

Type species
- M. succineus Simon, 1887

Species
- 6, see text

Genus of spiders

Macrinus is a genus of huntsman spiders that was first described by Eugène Louis Simon in 1887.

== Species ==
As of September 2019 it contains six species, found in South America, the United States, and on Tobago:

- Macrinus bambuco Rheims, 2010 – Colombia
- Macrinus calypso Rheims, 2010 – Tobago
- Macrinus jaegeri Rheims, 2007 – Brazil
- Macrinus mohavensis (Fox, 1937) – USA
- Macrinus pollexensis (Schenkel, 1953) – Venezuela, Brazil
- Macrinus succineus Simon, 1887 (type) – Ecuador to Brazil

== See also ==
- List of Sparassidae species
