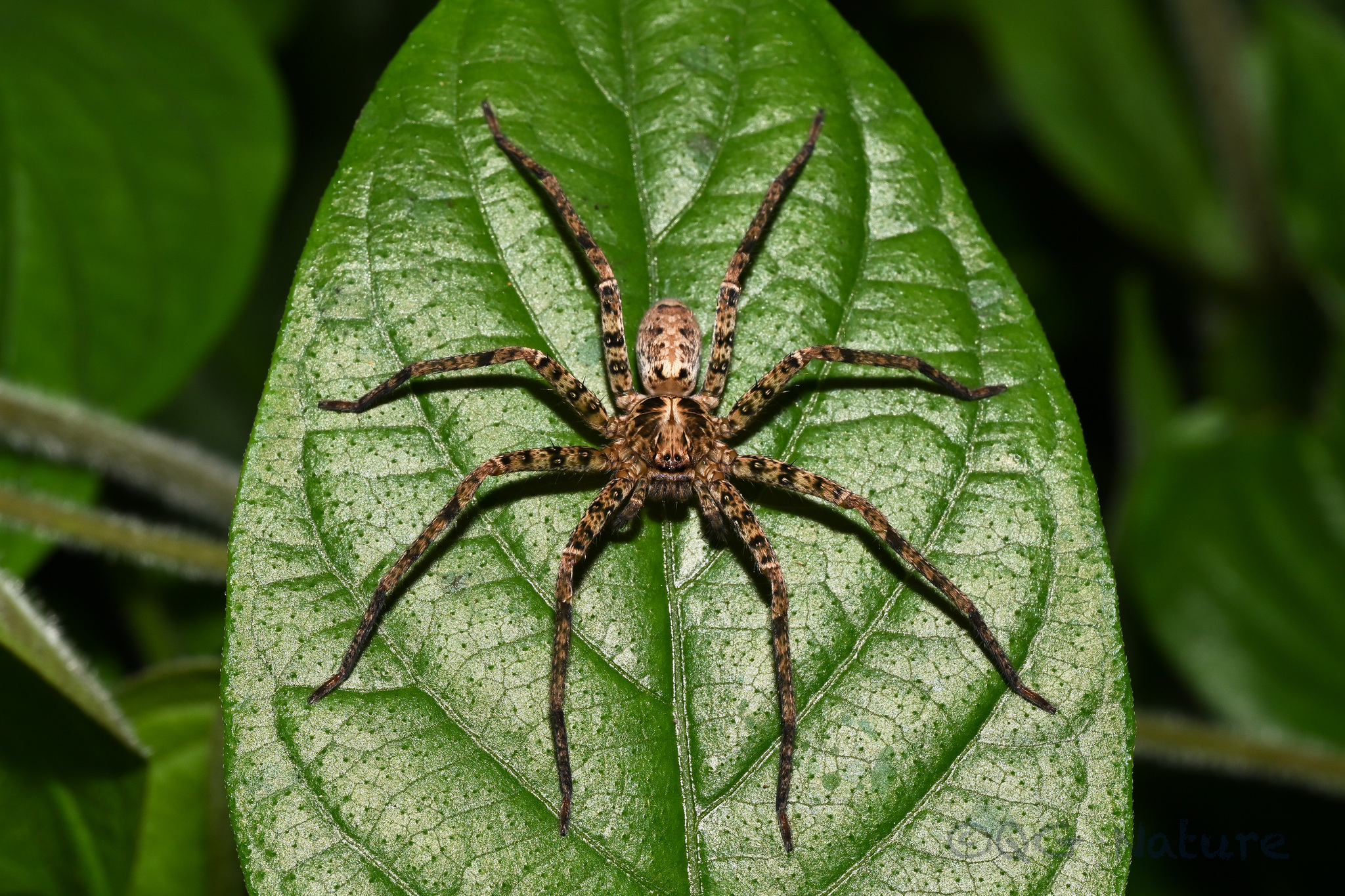
- from Zhejiang Province

Scientific classification
- Kingdom: Animalia
- Phylum: Arthropoda
- Subphylum: Chelicerata
- Class: Arachnida
- Order: Araneae
- Infraorder: Araneomorphae
- Family: Sparassidae
- Genus: Heteropoda
- Species: H. amphora

Binomial name
- Heteropoda amphora Fox, 1936

= Heteropoda amphora =

Species of spider

Heteropoda amphora is a species of huntsman spider in the family Sparassidae. It is found in China.

== Distribution ==
H. amphora is distributed across several provinces in China, including Jiangxi, Guangxi, Sichuan, and Zhejiang. The species was recently recorded from Jiangxi Province for the first time in 2024 from the Guanshan National Nature Reserve in Yifeng County.

== Description ==
Heteropoda amphora is a relatively large huntsman spider. Females can reach a total body length of up to 16.45 mm, with the carapace measuring approximately 7.85 mm in length and 8.60 mm in width, and the abdomen measuring about 8.60 mm in length. The original description by Irving Fox noted a specimen with a total length of 18 mm.

The carapace is brown with yellowish-white horizontal stripes at the posterior end and a white horizontal stripe on the forehead. The eye area appears reddish, while the sternum is yellowish-brown. The legs are yellowish-brown with black markings, and notably, leg IV may be absent in some specimens. The abdomen is black with distinctive white markings: two white spots on the anterior end of the dorsal surface and irregular white markings on the posterior surface. The ventral surface is brown.

The species can be distinguished from the similar Heteropoda jasminae by the structure of the female reproductive organs, particularly the lateral margins of the septum, which are parallel in the middle and narrow only slightly posteriorly, whereas in H. jasminae the lateral margins narrow continuously from anterior to posterior.

== Taxonomy ==
The species was first described by Fox in 1936 based on a female holotype from Sichuan Province, China. The male was later described by Zhang in 1998. The holotype is deposited in the National Museum of Natural History (USNM) at the Smithsonian Institution in Washington, D.C.
