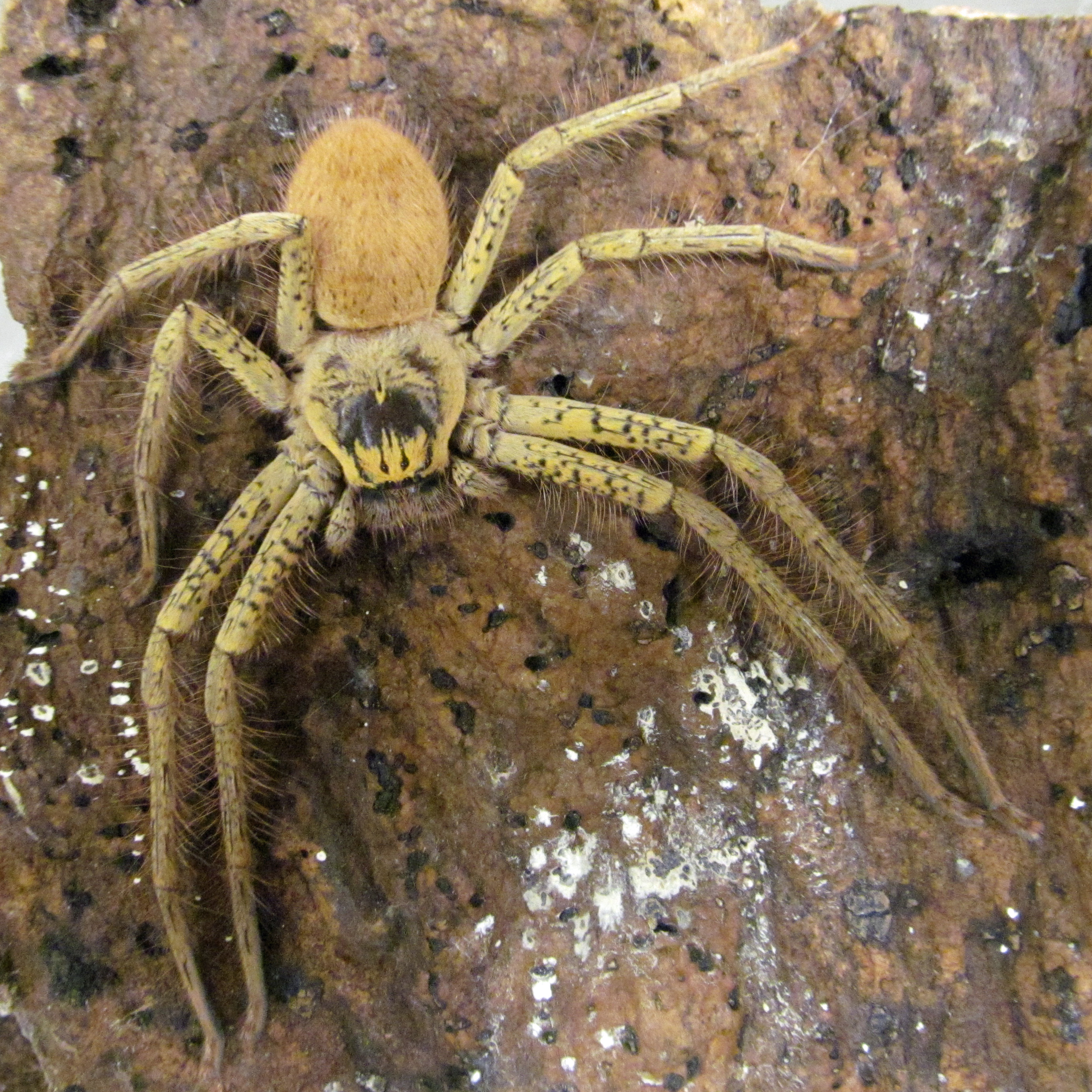
- Female Beregama aurea

Scientific classification
- Kingdom: Animalia
- Phylum: Arthropoda
- Subphylum: Chelicerata
- Class: Arachnida
- Order: Araneae
- Infraorder: Araneomorphae
- Family: Sparassidae
- Genus: Beregama
- Species: B. aurea

Binomial name
- Beregama aurea (L. Koch, 1875)

Synonyms
- Isopeda aurea L. Koch, 1875

= Beregama aurea =

Species of spider

Beregama aurea, sometimes called the golden huntsman, is a species of spider endemic to Queensland and parts of New South Wales, Australia. It is a member of the genus Beregama of huntsman spiders. It is the second-largest known species of spider.

== Description ==
This species closely resembles Beregama cordata. It also resembles several other Australian huntsman spiders, especially species from the genus Neosparassus, although it is much larger than most Neosparassus spiders.

It is notable for its size, with adult specimens weighing over 5.5 grams and measuring up to 15 cm (6 in) across the forelegs. This makes it the largest species of huntsman spider in Australia, and the second-largest in the world.

== Range ==
The species is mostly found in Far North Queensland, but is occasionally found as far south as Ballina, New South Wales.
