= Heteropoda kandiana =

Scientific classification
- Kingdom: Animalia
- Phylum: Arthropoda
- Subphylum: Chelicerata
- Class: Arachnida
- Order: Araneae
- Infraorder: Araneomorphae
- Family: Sparassidae
- Genus: Heteropoda
- Species: H. kandiana

Binomial name
- Heteropoda kandiana Pocock, 1899

Species of spider

Heteropoda kandiana is a species of spiders of the genus Heteropoda. It is native to India and Sri Lanka.
