= Heteropoda sumatrana =

Scientific classification
- Kingdom: Animalia
- Phylum: Arthropoda
- Subphylum: Chelicerata
- Class: Arachnida
- Order: Araneae
- Infraorder: Araneomorphae
- Family: Sparassidae
- Genus: Heteropoda
- Species: H. sumatrana

Binomial name
- Heteropoda sumatrana Thorell, 1890

Species of spider

Heteropoda sumatrana is a species of spiders in the genus Heteropoda, family Sparassidae, found in Indonesia (Java and Sumatra). It was first described by Thorell in 1890.

== Subspecies ==
As of August 2017, the World Spider Catalog accepts two subspecies:

- H. s. javacola Strand, 1907
- H. s. sumatrana

Heteropoda sumatrana montana Thorell, 1890 is treated as a separate species, Heteropoda montana.
