= Cryptocheilus discolor =

Scientific classification
- Domain: Eukaryota
- Kingdom: Animalia
- Phylum: Arthropoda
- Class: Insecta
- Order: Hymenoptera
- Family: Pompilidae
- Genus: Cryptocheilus
- Species: C. discolor

Binomial name
- Cryptocheilus discolor (Fabricius, 1793)

Synonyms
- Cryptocheilus eatoni (Saunders, 1901); Cryptocheilus luteipennis (Fabricius); Cryptochilus discolor (Fabricius, 1793); Cryptochilus eatoni Saunders, 1901; Cryptochilus luteipennis (Fabricius, 1804); Pompilus graellsii Guérin, 1843; Pompilus grohmanni Spinola, 1808; Pompilus luteipennis Fabricius, 1804; Priocnemis graellssi Guerin; Priocnemis nigriventris Costa, 1874; Salius discolor Fabricius; Salius dissimilis Smith, 1855; Sphex discolor Fabricius, 1793

Species of wasp

Cryptocheilus discolor is a species of pepsid spider wasp which is found in the Mediterranean Basin and the Middle East.

== Distribution ==
From Iberia and Morocco east through the Mediterranean Basin to Iran and Central Asia.

== Biology ==
Apparently little known, has been recorded feeding on the flowers of Mentha pulegium.
