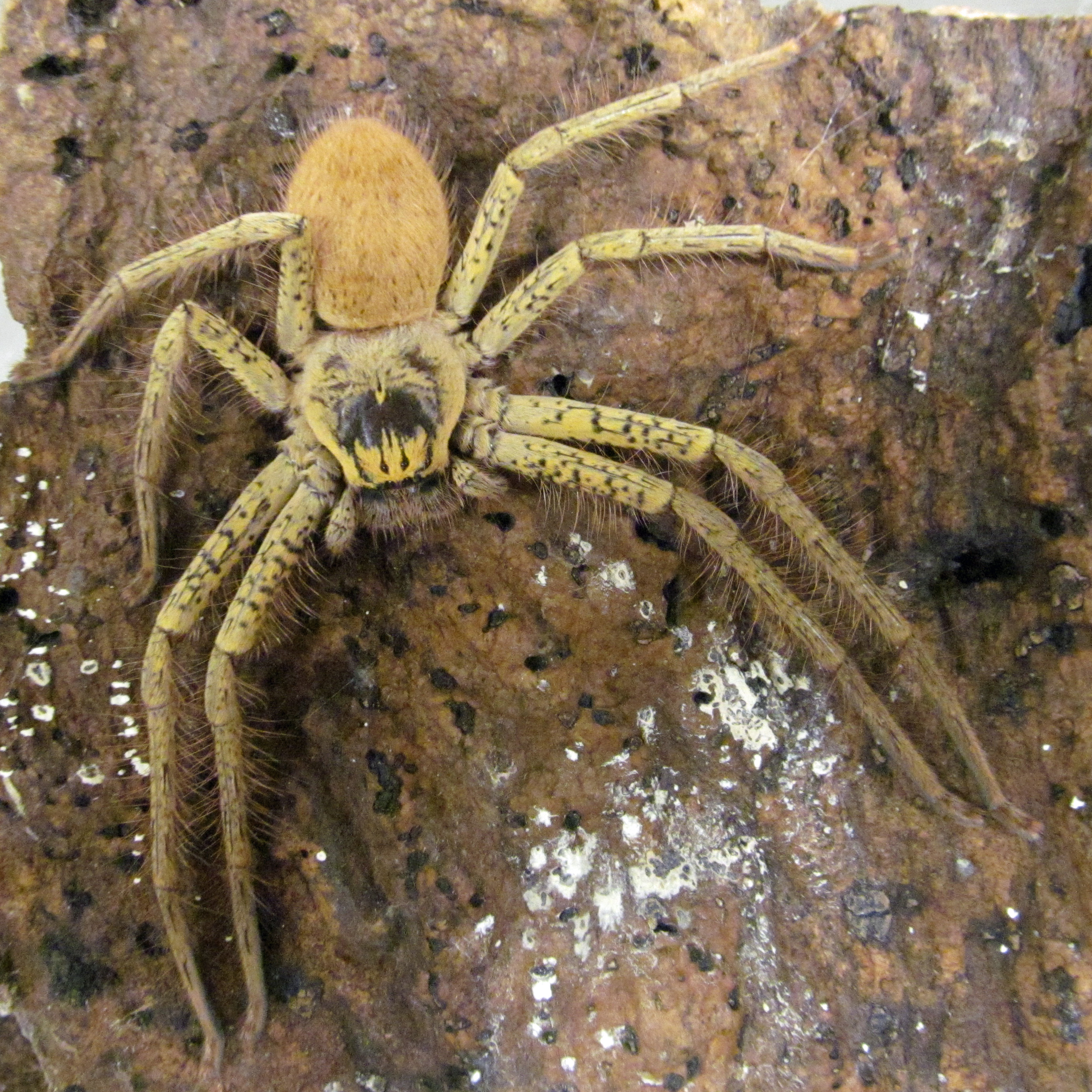
- Female Beregama aurea

Scientific classification
- Kingdom: Animalia
- Phylum: Arthropoda
- Subphylum: Chelicerata
- Class: Arachnida
- Order: Araneae
- Infraorder: Araneomorphae
- Family: Sparassidae
- Genus: Beregama; Hirst, 1990

Type species
- B. aurea (L. Koch, 1875)

Species
- 4, see text

= Beregama =

Genus of spiders

Beregama is a genus of South Pacific huntsman spiders. It was first introduced by D. B. Hirst in 1990 by splitting off four species of genus Isopeda.

== Species ==
As of September 2019 it contains four species, found in Papua New Guinea and Australia:

- Beregama aurea (L. Koch, 1875) (golden huntsman) – Australia (Queensland, New South Wales)
- Beregama cordata (L. Koch, 1875) (fire-back huntsman) – Australia (Queensland, New South Wales)
- Beregama goliath (Chrysanthus, 1965) – New Guinea
- Beregama herculea (Thorell, 1881) – New Guinea
