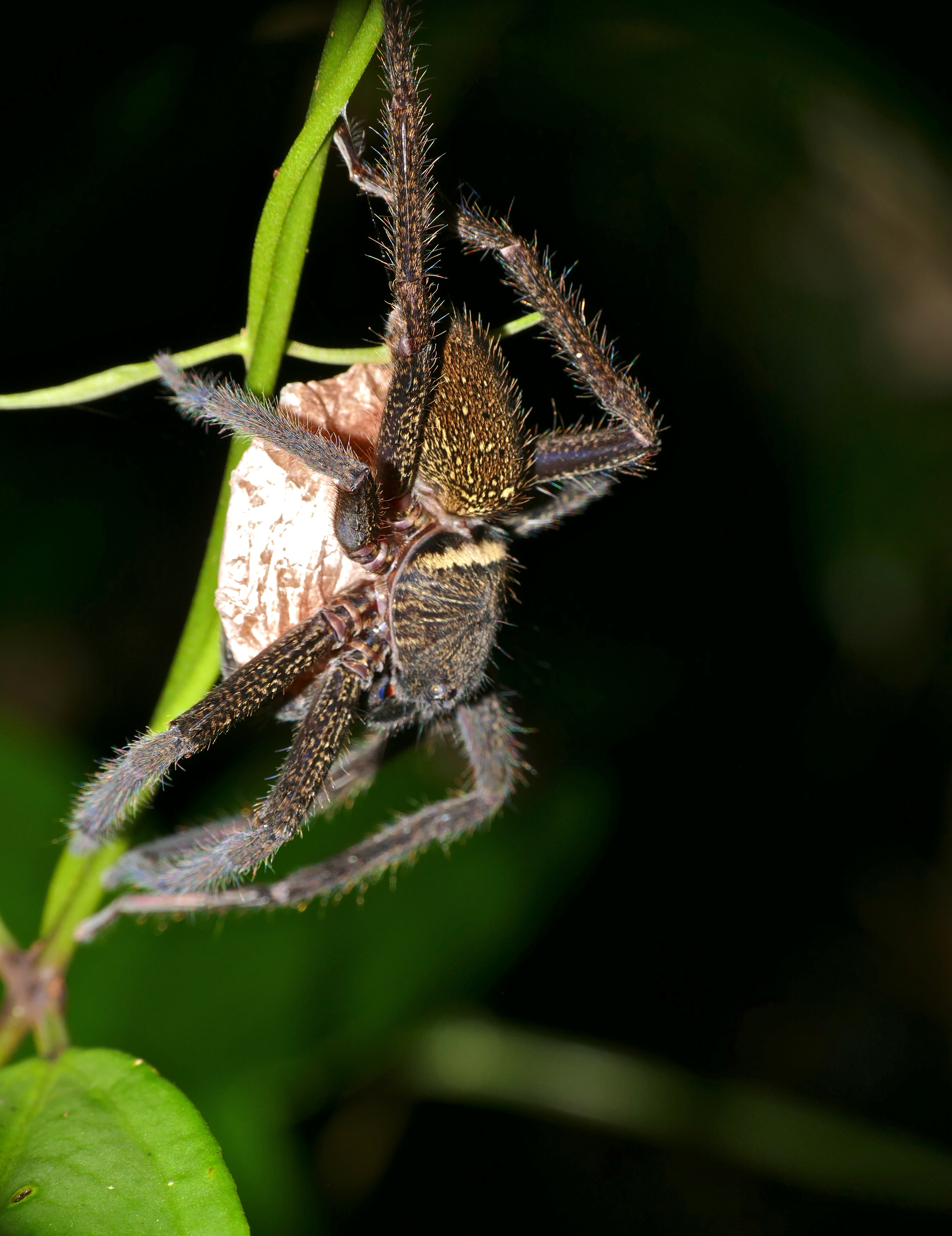
- female with egg sac

Scientific classification
- Kingdom: Animalia
- Phylum: Arthropoda
- Subphylum: Chelicerata
- Class: Arachnida
- Order: Araneae
- Infraorder: Araneomorphae
- Family: Sparassidae
- Genus: Heteropoda
- Species: H. tetrica

Binomial name
- Heteropoda tetrica Thorell, 1897

= Heteropoda tetrica =

Black-jaw Huntsman

Species of spider

Heteropoda tetrica is a species of huntsman spider in the genus Heteropoda. It was first described by Tamerlan Thorell in 1897.

== Taxonomy ==
The species was originally described by Thorell in 1897 based on both male and female specimens from the Carin Hills (now known as the Karen Hills) in Myanmar. The lectotype is housed at the Natural History Museum of Denmark in Copenhagen, with additional paralectotypes at the Zoological Museum Hamburg.

== Distribution ==
H. tetrica is distributed from China to Indonesia (Sumatra). The species has been recorded from various locations across Southeast Asia, with detailed studies documenting its presence in Myanmar, Thailand, and southern China, particularly in Xishuangbanna Dai Autonomous Prefecture.

== Description ==
Heteropoda tetrica is a medium to large-sized huntsman spider. Females can reach a body length of up to 30 millimeters with a leg span significantly larger, while males are generally smaller at around 24 millimeters in body length. The species exhibits the typical flattened body form characteristic of huntsman spiders.

The coloration is generally dark brown to blackish-brown, sometimes with a reddish tinge. The body is covered with dense olive-colored or testaceous-olive pubescence. The abdomen may show a narrow longitudinal pale stripe anteriorly. The legs and palps are covered with dense reddish or sub-testaceous-olive pubescence.

Males can be distinguished from females by their longer legs, more closely spaced eyes, and distinctive palpal structure. The male palps are elongated with a characteristic tibial apophysis that forms a long oblique transverse ridge, with the superior-anterior angle producing a long, strong process.

The female epigyne consists of two oblong diverging elevations that are rounded posteriorly and truncated anteriorly, closely adjacent to each other and separated by a narrow longitudinal groove.
