= Heteropoda dagmarae =

Scientific classification
- Domain: Eukaryota
- Kingdom: Animalia
- Phylum: Arthropoda
- Subphylum: Chelicerata
- Class: Arachnida
- Order: Araneae
- Infraorder: Araneomorphae
- Family: Sparassidae
- Genus: Heteropoda
- Species: H. dagmarae

Binomial name
- Heteropoda dagmarae Jäger & Vedel, 2005

Species of spider

Heteropoda dagmarae is a large species of spider in the family Sparassidae. This species is found in northern and central Laos. The spider is nocturnal and lives in forest. It hunts by ambushing its prey from shrubs, trees, and bamboo about two to four meters above the ground. It was not recorded as a new species until 2005.
