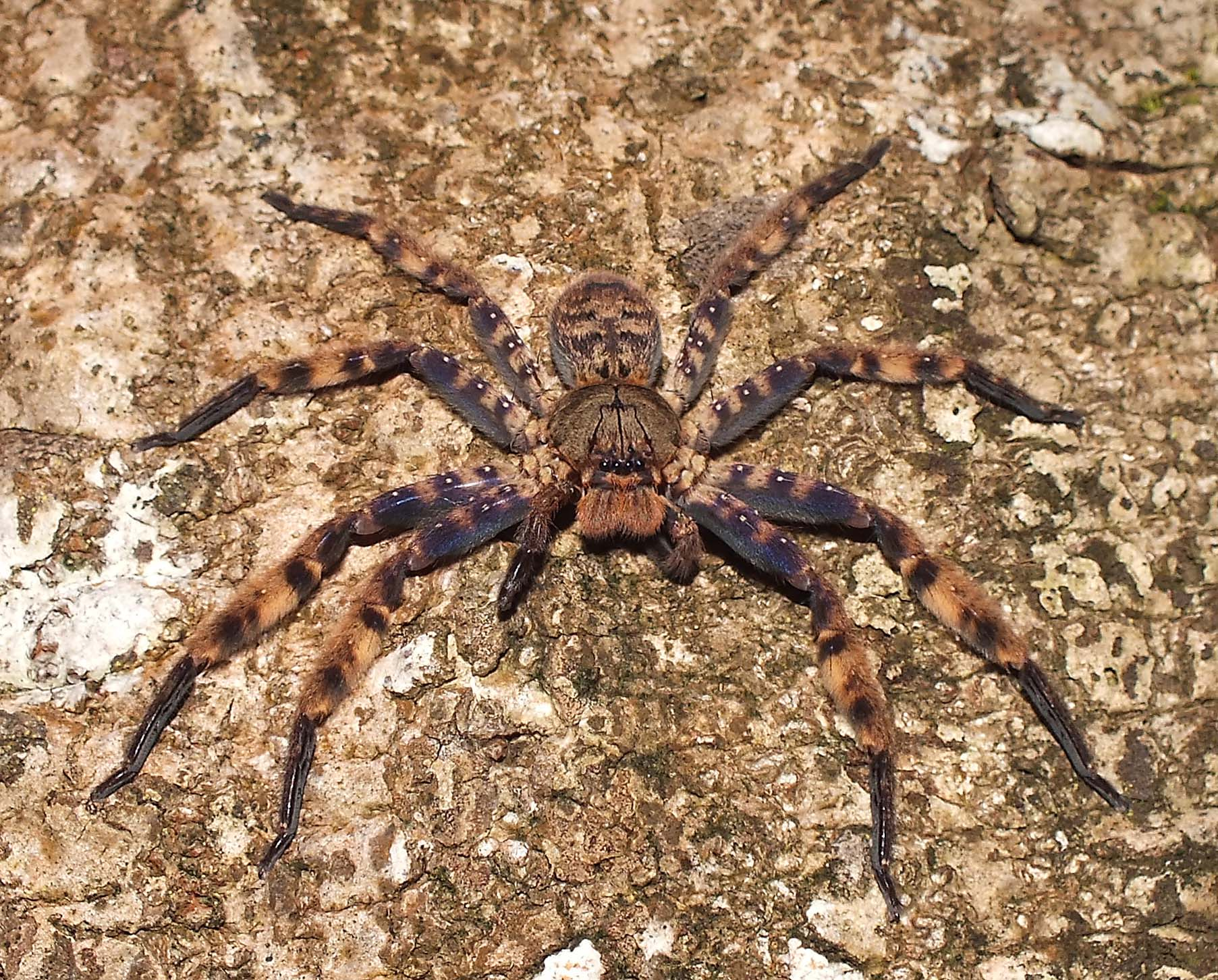

Scientific classification
- Domain: Eukaryota
- Kingdom: Animalia
- Phylum: Arthropoda
- Subphylum: Chelicerata
- Class: Arachnida
- Order: Araneae
- Infraorder: Araneomorphae
- Family: Sparassidae
- Genus: Heteropoda
- Species: H. lunula

Binomial name
- Heteropoda lunula (Doleschall, 1857)

= Heteropoda lunula =

Species of huntsman spider

Heteropoda lunula is a large species of spider in the family Sparassidae. This species is found throughout South and Southeast asia, particularly from India to Vietnam, as well as in Malaysia and Indonesia. Heteropoda lunula is a popular huntsman spider in the pet trade.
