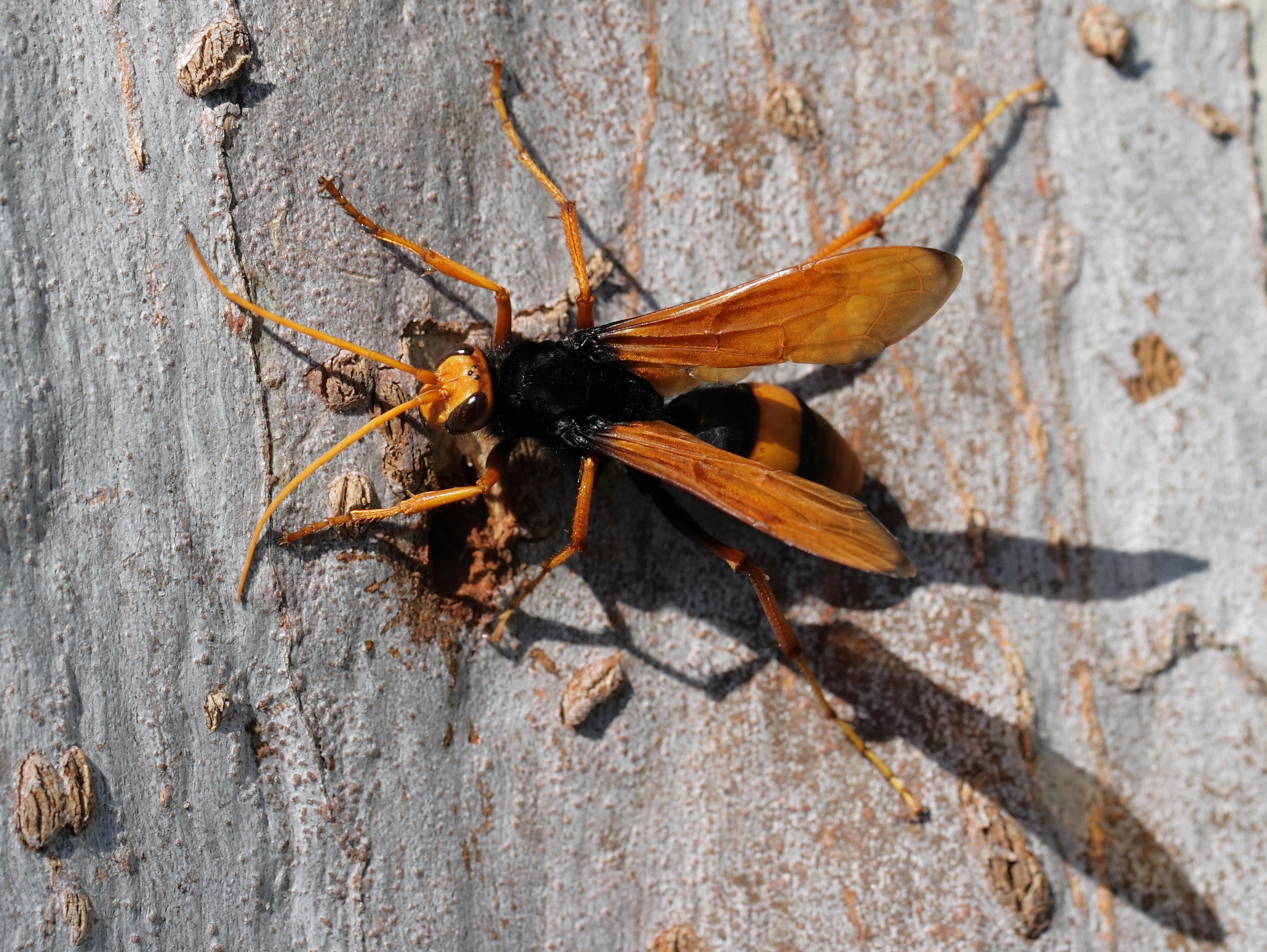

Scientific classification
- Domain: Eukaryota
- Kingdom: Animalia
- Phylum: Arthropoda
- Class: Insecta
- Order: Hymenoptera
- Family: Pompilidae
- Genus: Heterodontonyx
- Species: H. bicolor

Binomial name
- Heterodontonyx bicolor (Fabricius, 1775)

Synonyms
- Cryptocheilus bicolor (Fabricius, 1775); Heterodontonyx basalis Haupt, 1935; Heterodontonyx guerini Banks, 1941; Salius bicolor (Fabricius, 1775); Sphex bicolor Fabricius, 1775

= Heterodontonyx bicolor =

Orange spider wasp

Species of wasp

Heterodontonyx bicolor (orange spider wasp) is a large, strikingly coloured spider wasp from Australia.

== Description and identification ==
The body ranges from 20 to 40 mm in length. The head, legs, and antenna are black and orange-yellow in colour, with dark brown to black thorax and eyes. The wings are orange with darkened bases and apices, and the abdomen is orange with the first segment and a band on the second segment black.

H. bicolor is similar in coloration to several allied species found in Australia but is usually distinguishable by the broad black band on the second segment of the abdomen. It is further distinguished by the combination of a pair of developed tubercles on each side of the propodeum and a broad clypeus.

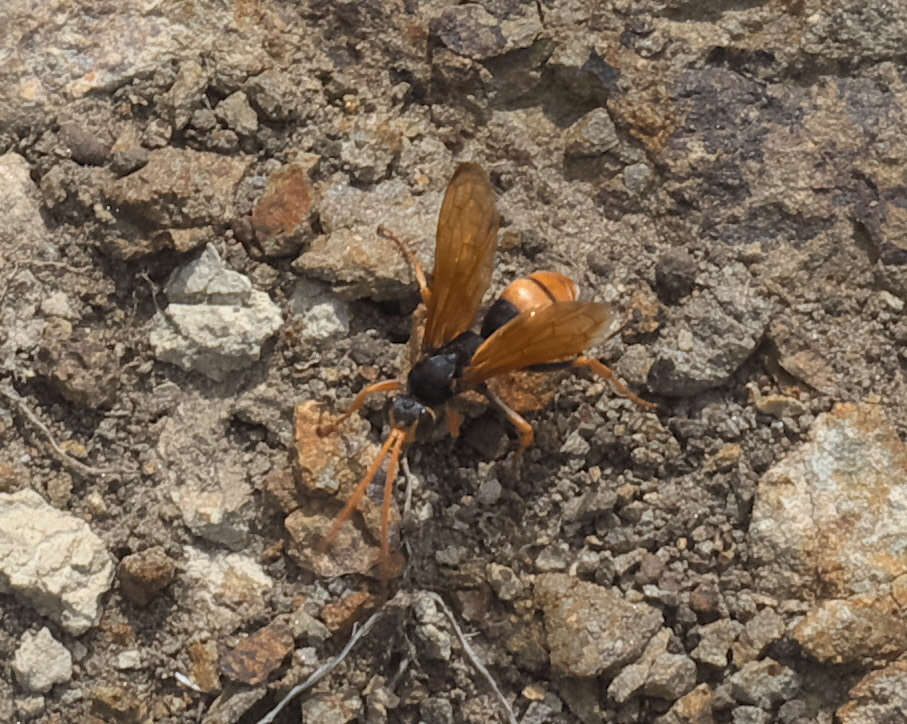
H. australis has narrower banding on the abdomen and lacks propodeal tubercles

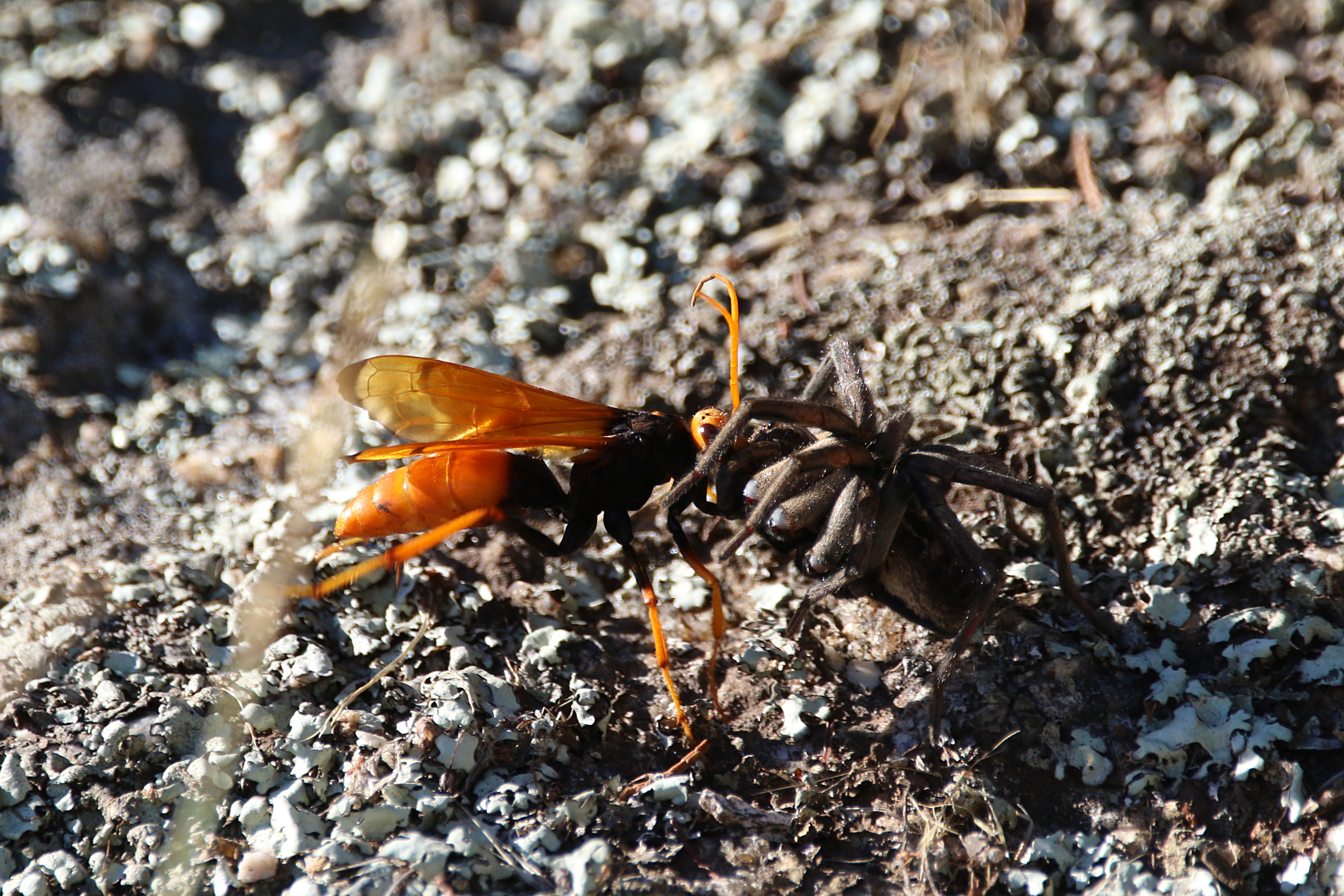
H. tuberculatus lacks banding on the abdomen but also has developed propodeal tubercles

== Distribution ==
H. bicolor is native across most of Australia. It has also been introduced to New Zealand. Additional records come from Indonesia and Papua New Guinea.

== Biology ==
This wasp is a predator of the huntsman spiders in the genera Heteropoda and Isopeda (family Sparassidae) and wolf spiders in the genus Lycosa (Lycosidae). As with other Pompilidae, the female paralyses the spider by stinging it in its underside. The prey is then dragged to a burrow, dug by the female using shovel-like hairs on its front legs. The wasp then lays an egg on the spider, and conceals the nesting chamber at the end of the burrow. When the grub hatches it feeds on the spider before pupating in a thin silky cocoon in the cell.

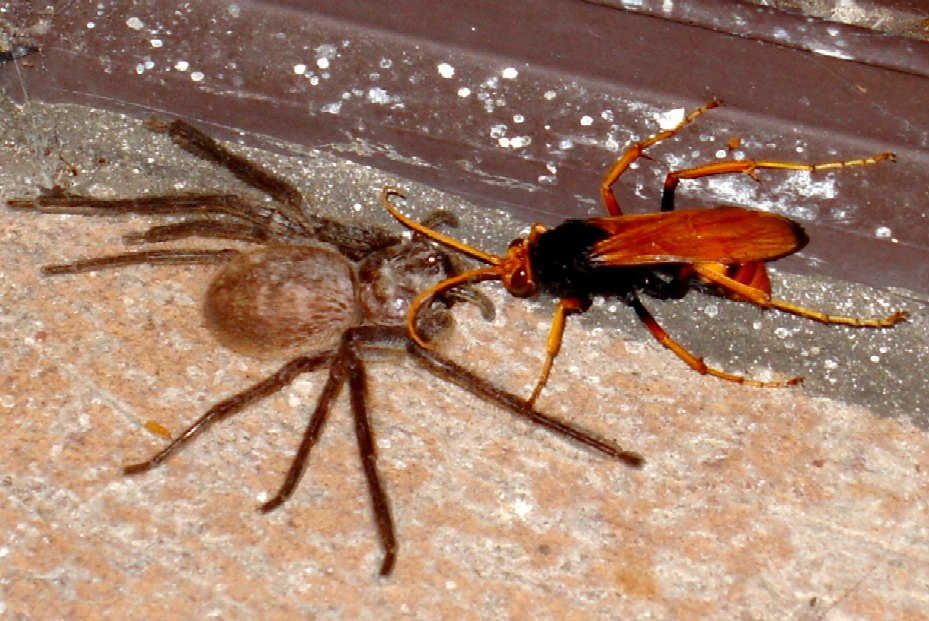
Hunting a huntsman spider - Western Australia

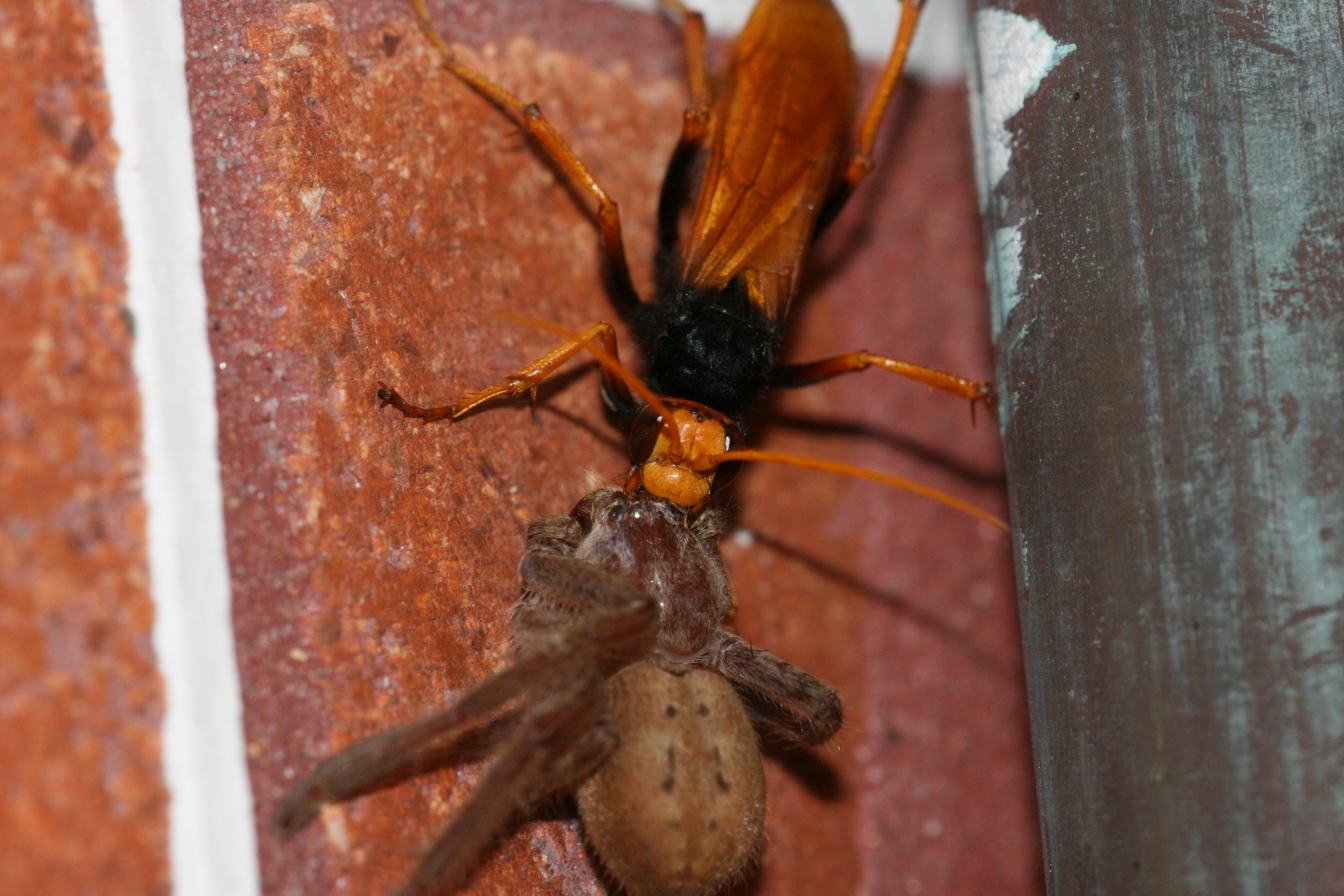
Orange spider wasp with huntsman spider - Sydney, NSW

The wasp's sting has been described by Sam Robinson of the University of Queensland as extremely painful and "shockingly powerful", though it is unlikely to sting humans.
