= Heteropoda subtilis =

Scientific classification
- Kingdom: Animalia
- Phylum: Arthropoda
- Subphylum: Chelicerata
- Class: Arachnida
- Order: Araneae
- Infraorder: Araneomorphae
- Family: Sparassidae
- Genus: Heteropoda
- Species: H. subtilis

Binomial name
- Heteropoda subtilis Karsch, 1892

Species of spider

Heteropoda subtilis, is a species of spider of the genus Heteropoda. It is endemic to Sri Lanka.
