= Heterodontonyx =

- Heterodontonyx bicolor with its prey, Isopedella victorialis

Scientific classification
- Kingdom: Animalia
- Phylum: Arthropoda
- Clade: Pancrustacea
- Class: Insecta
- Order: Hymenoptera
- Family: Pompilidae
- Subfamily: Pepsinae
- Tribe: Pepsini
- Genus: Heterodontonyx; Haupt, 1935

Genus of spider wasps

Heterodontonyx is a genus of spider wasps.

Heterodontonyx contains the following species:

- Heterodontonyx solomonis
- Heterodontonyx darwinii
- Heterodontonyx erythroura
- Heterodontonyx fulvidorsalis
- Heterodontonyx wahisi
- Heterodontonyx tuberculatus
- Heterodontonyx commixtus
- Heterodontonyx praepositus
- Heterodontonyx distinctus
- Heterodontonyx bicolor
- Heterodontonyx australis
