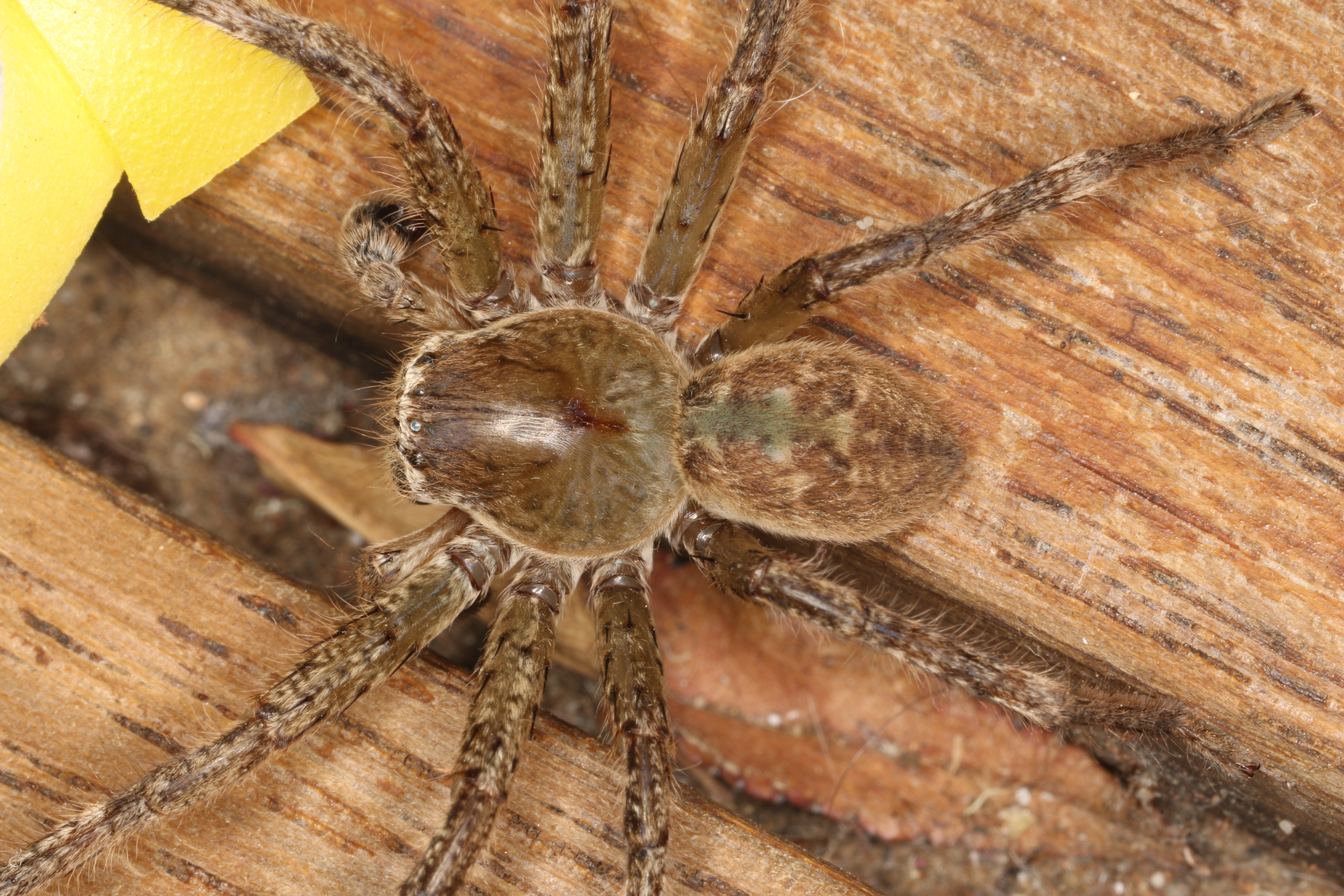
- Neosparassus sp.

Scientific classification
- Domain: Eukaryota
- Kingdom: Animalia
- Phylum: Arthropoda
- Subphylum: Chelicerata
- Class: Arachnida
- Order: Araneae
- Infraorder: Araneomorphae
- Family: Sparassidae
- Genus: Neosparassus; Hogg, 1903

Type species
- Neosparassus diana

Species
- 19, see text

= Neosparassus =

Genus of spiders

Neosparassus is a genus of huntsman spiders found in Australia and first described by Henry Roughton Hogg in 1903. Members of this genus most closely resemble those of Heteropoda, except that the cephalothorax is high, peaking between the midpoint and the eyes, before sloping toward the back. This angle causes the front of these spiders to appear more prominent than it actually is.

== Species ==
As of March 2019 it contains the following species:

- Neosparassus calligaster (Thorell, 1870) — Australia
- Neosparassus conspicuus (L. Koch, 1875) — Queensland
- Neosparassus diana (L. Koch, 1875) — Western Australia, Victoria, Tasmania
- Neosparassus festivus (L. Koch, 1875) — New South Wales
- Neosparassus grapsus (Walckenaer, 1837) — Australia
- Neosparassus haemorrhoidalis (L. Koch, 1875) — New South Wales
- Neosparassus incomtus (L. Koch, 1875) — New South Wales
- Neosparassus inframaculatus (Hogg, 1896) — Central Australia
- Neosparassus macilentus (L. Koch, 1875) — Queensland, Victoria
- Neosparassus magareyi Hogg, 1903 — Australia
- Neosparassus nitellinus (L. Koch, 1875) — Queensland
- Neosparassus pallidus (L. Koch, 1875) — Queensland
- Neosparassus patellatus (Karsch, 1878) — Tasmania
- Neosparassus pictus (L. Koch, 1875) — Queensland
- Neosparassus praeclarus (L. Koch, 1875) — Queensland
- Neosparassus punctatus (L. Koch, 1865) — Australia
- Neosparassus rutilus (L. Koch, 1875) — Queensland
- Neosparassus salacius (L. Koch, 1875) — Queensland, New South Wales
- Neosparassus thoracicus Hogg, 1903 — Northern Australia
