= Charles Marquet =

French naturalist

Charles Marquet (1820 in Beziers – 1900 in Toulouse), was a French naturalist. He was especially active in the fields of entomology, ornithology and herpetology. He was employed at the Compagnie des Canons du Midi and he was a founder member of the Société d'histoire naturelle de Toulouse in 1866.

== Natural History Work ==
He was interested in the beetles, of which he had a collection, gathered during his professional activities. He switched his principal interest to the Hymenoptera and the Orthoptera once he had retired. He often collected in the company of V. Mayet and one of his brothers. The main areas where he collected were around Toulouse and Beziers but once a year he spent a month in the area of the Etang de Vendres. He published the Catalogue des Coléoptères du Languedoc, espèces observées dans quelques régions de cette province, notamment à Toulouse, Béziers in six papers between 1869 and 1882, with a simultaneous complete publication of this work. The second edition, published in 1897, contained biogeographic information for the longhorn beetles which was not contained in the first edition. After his death Marquet's nephew gave his collection of reptiles to the Toulouse Museum.

== Publications ==
The following papers are credited to Marquet:

- Tableau des espèces européennes du genre Clythra. Bull. Soc. Hist.. nat. Toulouse, I : 91. (1867)
- Note sur une plante de la famille des hydrocharidiès (Udora canadensis, trouvée dans les canaux du midi, à l’embouchure. Bull. Soc. Hist. nat. *Toulouse, XIV : 263.(1880)
- Notice entomologique sur l'étang de Vendres. Bull. Soc. Et. Sc. nat. Béziers, 6 : 9-18.(1881)
- Matériaux pouvant contribuer à une faune entomologique du sud-ouest de la France (Hémiptères). Bull. Hist. nat. Toulouse, 23 : 73.(1889)
- Tableau des oiseaux mouches, figurés et décrits par Lesson, classés suivant l’ordre du catalogue G. Gray, avec les dé, ominations de cet auteur et celles de Reichenbach. Bull. Hist. nat. Toulouse, 30 : 63.{1896)
- Catalogue des Coléoptères du Languedoc, espèces observées dans quelques régions de cette province, notamment à Toulouse, Béziers, Cette etc. Bull. Hist. nat. Toulouse, 31(5) : 5-240. [Cerambycidae : 203-210].(1897)
