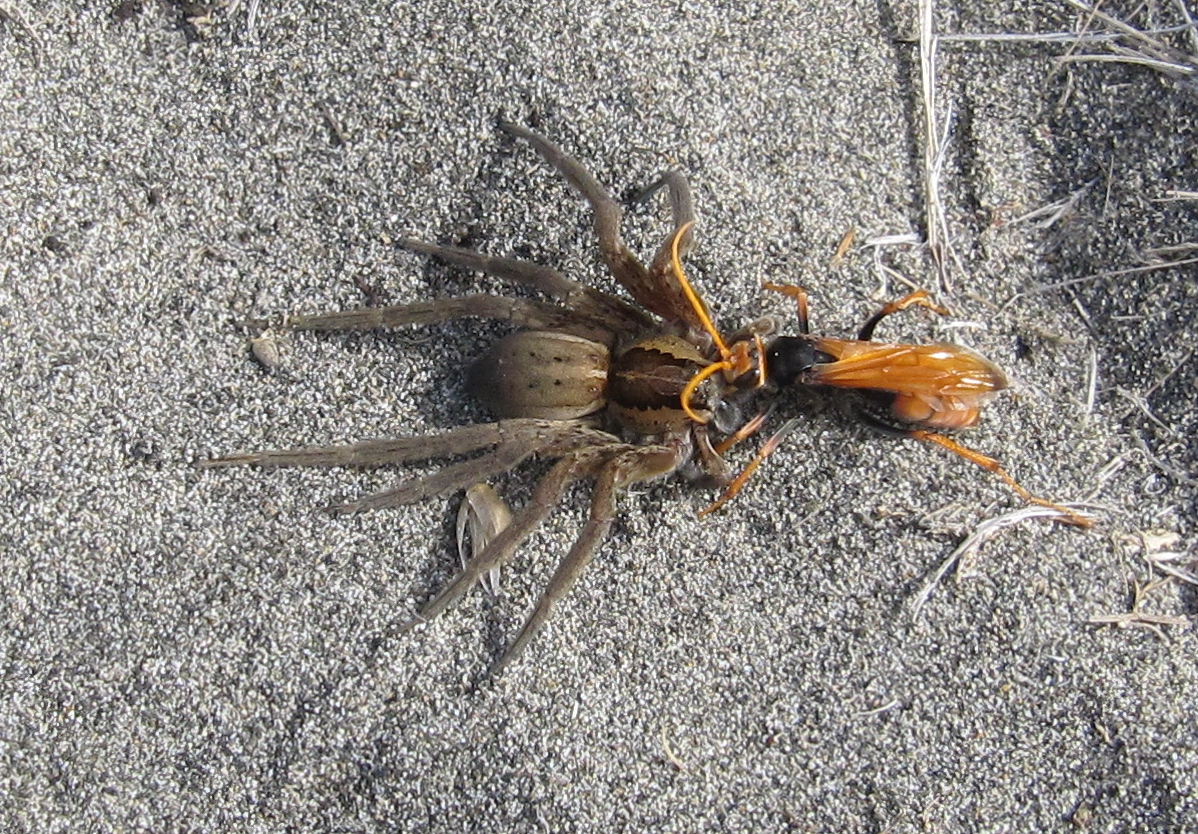
- Heterdontonyx australis dragging a nursery web spider

Scientific classification
- Kingdom: Animalia
- Phylum: Arthropoda
- Clade: Pancrustacea
- Class: Insecta
- Order: Hymenoptera
- Family: Pompilidae
- Genus: Heterodontonyx
- Species: H. australis

Binomial name
- Heterodontonyx australis (Guérin, 1830)

Synonyms
- Pompilus australis Guérin-Méneville, 1830; Leptodialepis australis (Guérin-Méneville, 1830); Cryptocheilus australis (Guérin-Méneville, 1830); Salius australis (Guérin-Méneville, 1830)

= Heterodontonyx australis =

Species of wasp

Heterodontonyx australis, the golden spider wasp, is an Australian pepsine spider wasp that was accidentally introduced to New Zealand around 1960 (66 years ago).

== Description ==
The adults are a rich reddish yellow colour giving rise to the vernacular name golden spider wasp. Females are 16–22 mm (0.63–0.87 in) in length while males are 11.6–18.5 mm (0.46–0.73 in).

== Biology ==
Hunting females mainly use vision but antennal chemoreception plays some role. The prey in New Zealand is usually a spider from the family Pisauridae which the wasp pursues until it stops and cowers, when the wasp rushes at it, stinging it twice. When the spider collapses, it has its dorsum up and the wasp then slowly curves its abdomen beneath the spider's prosoma and carefully stabs the prosomal venter, examines the pedipalps, walks over the spider, then stings it a second time on the prosomal venter. After being stung so many times the paralysis is strong; stung spiders do not subsequently recover movement of their legs.

The female wasp holds the prey spider by the chelicerae and walks backwards, dragging it dorsum uppermost. When a female carrying prey periodically leaves the spider to inspect its nest, the spider is left exposed, dorsum uppermost, and is temporarily hidden.

Nests are made in pre-existing cavities under stones, in cracks in exposed compacted clay, in unmodified clay, and beside stumps, posts, etc. A complete cell and cell-passage is constructed before the female C. australis start to hunt. Paralysed spiders are placed in the cells facing away from the cell entrance. After the female has laid eggs on the spider she fills a 20–27 mm length of the cell-passage with compacted earth. The main burrow of the nest and its external entrance are kept open for the duration the nesting cycle.

The males emerge first, 3–8 days before the females and gather around the nests, often entering them and sometimes assisting the females to hatch before mating with the docile, newly emerged females. After around two days the females commence hunting and may re-use old nests but construct new cells.

In New Zealand adults have been seen feeding on Leptospermum scoparium flowers but umbellifers are the favoured flowers for nectaring.

== Distribution ==
Native to Tasmania and south-eastern Australia, introduced to New Zealand where they are now found from the North Cape to Auckland.
