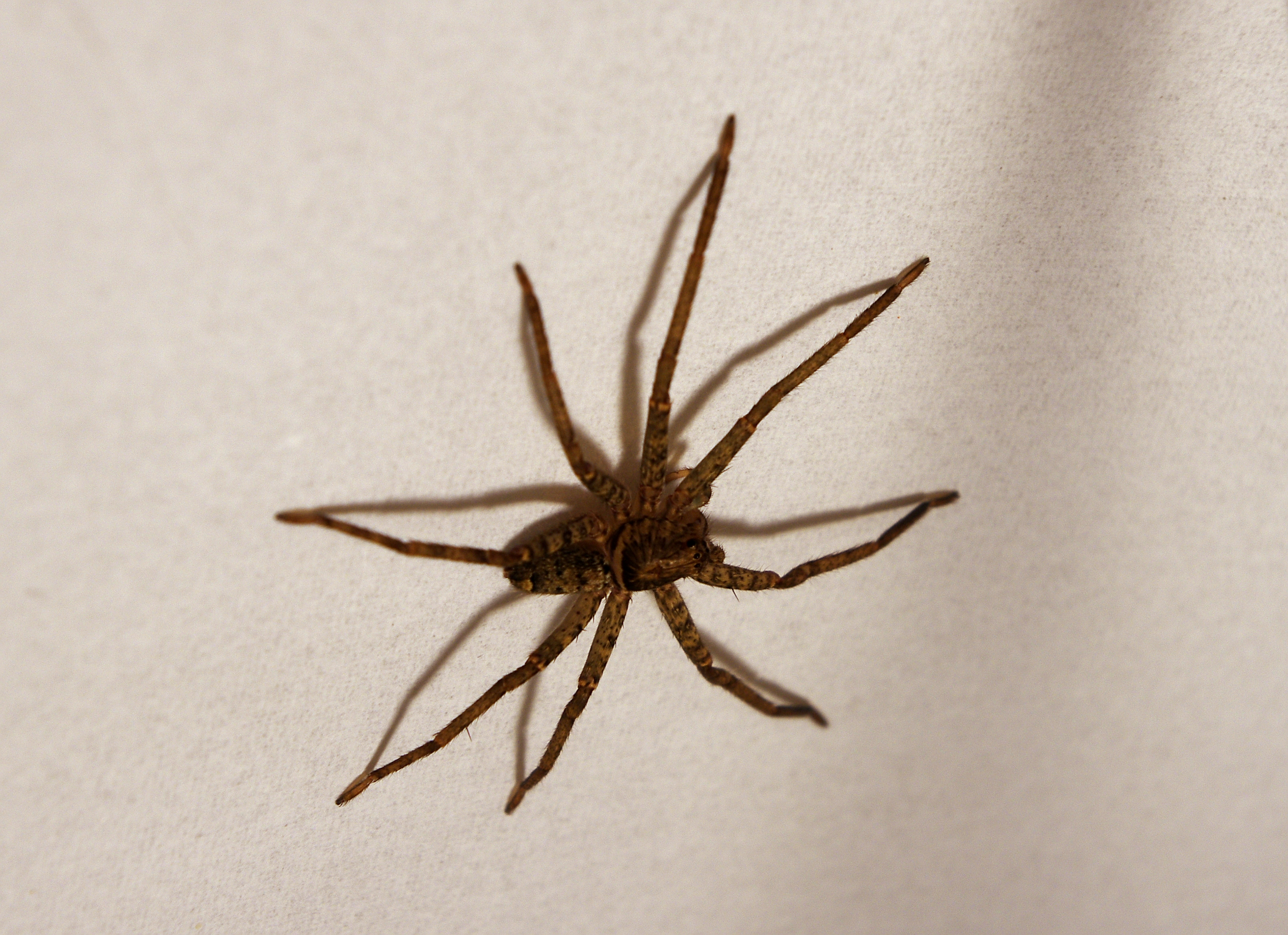
- Huntsman (probably H. jugulans) inside a lampshade in Sydney

Scientific classification
- Kingdom: Animalia
- Phylum: Arthropoda
- Subphylum: Chelicerata
- Class: Arachnida
- Order: Araneae
- Infraorder: Araneomorphae
- Family: Sparassidae
- Genus: Heteropoda
- Species: H. jugulans

Binomial name
- Heteropoda jugulans (L. Koch, 1876)

Synonyms
- Sarotes jugulans L. Koch, 1876

= Heteropoda jugulans =

Species of spider

Heteropoda jugulans, sometimes called the brown huntsman, is a species of spider endemic to parts of Eastern Australia. It is a member of the genus Heteropoda of huntsman spider.

== Context ==
Australian Heteropoda species are often difficult to tell apart, with only slight differences in the markings found on their upper bodies; exact identification can only be made by examining the spider's genitals under a microscope. According to Valerie Davies, there are at least 37 Australian Heteropoda species.

== Description ==
H. jugulans has a brown body with various markings: a black X-shaped marking on the head, black chevrons on the body, and often a black V-shaped marking on the underside of the abdomen. The body and head are roughly the same size. Males and females are similar in size, although males have longer legs.

== Behaviour ==
H. jugulans is a nocturnal species, and is typically found in the wild beneath the bark of trees. It will also enter houses, outbuildings and letterboxes at night to hunt, and can climb walls and glass and move across ceilings. It is an insectivore, but does not eat most cockroaches.

== Range ==
This is a common species of Heteropoda in South East Queensland, including the suburban Brisbane area. It can apparently be found as far north as Cooktown and Cape Tribulation. It is also found in New South Wales, as far south as Wollongong.
