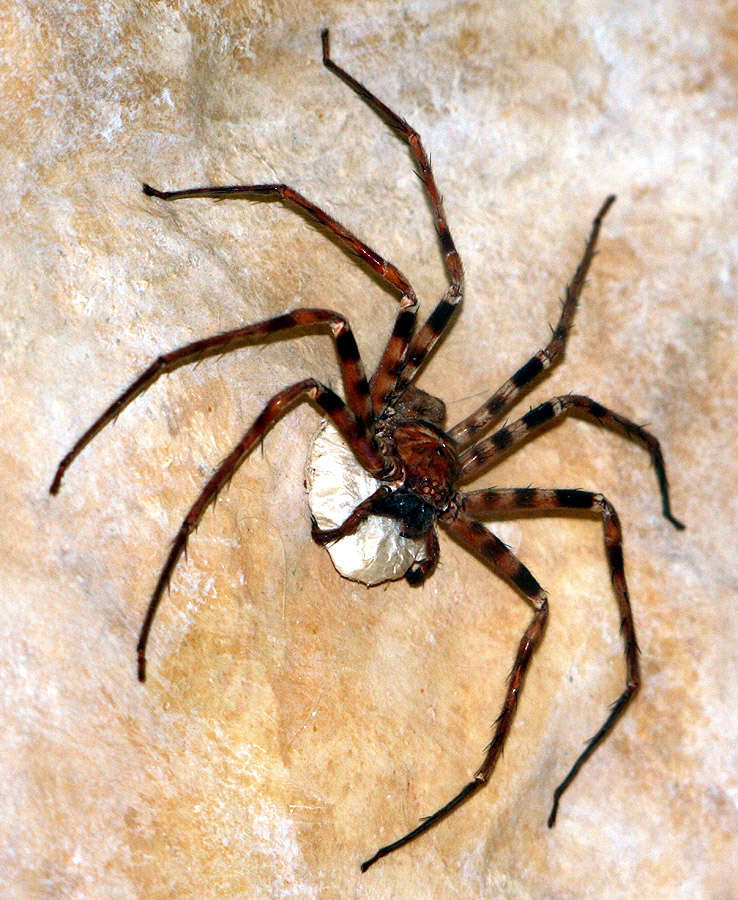
- Heteropoda maxima

Scientific classification
- Kingdom: Animalia
- Phylum: Arthropoda
- Subphylum: Chelicerata
- Class: Arachnida
- Order: Araneae
- Infraorder: Araneomorphae
- Family: Sparassidae
- Genus: Heteropoda; Latreille, 1804

Species
- 189 accepted species; see text.

= Heteropoda =

Heteropoda Temporal range: Palaeogene–present

Genus of spiders

The eye arrangement of spiders in the genus Heteropoda

Heteropoda is a genus of spiders in the family Sparassidae (the huntsman spiders). They are mainly distributed in tropical Asia and Australia, while at least one species, H. venatoria, has a cosmopolitan distribution, and H. variegata occurs in the Mediterranean.

These spiders catch and eat insects, but in a laboratory study one species readily ate fish and tadpoles when offered. H. venatoria has also been known to eat scorpions and bats.

The largest species in the genus, H. maxima, is about 4.6 centimeters long but has a legspan of up to 30 centimeters, making it the largest of any extant spider.

== Species ==
As of August 2022, there were 189 species in the genus, after series of revisions.

- Heteropoda acuta Davies, 1994 — Queensland
- Heteropoda aemulans Bayer & Jäger, 2009 — Laos
- Heteropoda afghana Roewer, 1962 — Afghanistan, Pakistan, India
- Heteropoda alta Davies, 1994 — Queensland
- Heteropoda altithorax Strand, 1907 — India
- Heteropoda altmannae Jäger, 2008 — Vietnam
- Heteropoda amphora Fox, 1936 — China, Hong Kong
- Heteropoda analis Thorell, 1881 — New Guinea
- Heteropoda armillata (Thorell, 1887) — Myanmar, Sumatra
- Heteropoda atollicola Pocock, 1904 — Maldive Islands
- Heteropoda atriventris Chrysanthus, 1965 — New Guinea
- Heteropoda badiella Roewer, 1951 — Moluccas
- Heteropoda bellendenker Davies, 1994 — Queensland
- Heteropoda belua Jäger, 2005 — Borneo
- Heteropoda beroni Jäger, 2005 — Sulawesi
- Heteropoda bhaikakai Patel & Patel, 1973 — India
- Heteropoda binnaburra Davies, 1994 — Queensland, New South Wales
- Heteropoda boiei (Doleschall, 1859) — Malaysia, Sumatra, Borneo, Java
- Heteropoda bonthainensis Merian, 1911 — Sulawesi
- Heteropoda borneensis (Thorell, 1890) — Borneo
- Heteropoda boutani (Simon, 1906) — Vietnam
- Heteropoda bulburin Davies, 1994 — Queensland
- Heteropoda camelia Strand, 1914 — Colombia
- Heteropoda cavernicola Davies, 1994 — Western Australia
- Heteropoda cece Jäger, 2014 — Borneo
- Heteropoda cervina (L. Koch, 1875) — Queensland
- Heteropoda chelata (Strand, 1911) — New Guinea
  - Heteropoda chelata vittichelis (Strand, 1911) — New Guinea
- Heteropoda chengbuensis Wang, 1990 — China
- Heteropoda christae Jäger, 2008 — Malaysia, Singapore, Sumatra
- Heteropoda conwayensis Davies, 1994 — Queensland
- Heteropoda cooki Davies, 1994 — Queensland
- Heteropoda cooloola Davies, 1994 — Queensland
- Heteropoda crassa Simon, 1880 — Java
- Heteropoda crediton Davies, 1994 — Queensland
- Heteropoda cyanichelis Strand, 1907 — Java
- Heteropoda cyanognatha Thorell, 1881 — Yule Islands
- Heteropoda cyperusiria Barrion & Litsinger, 1995 — Philippines
- Heteropoda dagmarae Jäger & Vedel, 2005 — Laos, Thailand
- Heteropoda dasyurina (Hogg, 1914) — New Guinea
- Heteropoda davidbowie Jäger, 2008 — Malaysia, Singapore, Sumatra
- Heteropoda debilis (L. Koch, 1875) — Samoa
- Heteropoda distincta Davies, 1994 — Queensland, New South Wales
- Heteropoda duan Jäger, 2008 — Borneo
- Heteropoda duo Jäger, 2008 — Borneo
- Heteropoda elatana Strand, 1911 — Aru Islands, Kei Islands
- Heteropoda eluta Karsch, 1891 — Sri Lanka
- Heteropoda emarginativulva Strand, 1907 — India
- Heteropoda ernstulrichi Jäger, 2008 — Sumatra
- Heteropoda erythra Chrysanthus, 1965 — New Guinea
- Heteropoda eungella Davies, 1994 — Queensland
- Heteropoda fabrei Simon, 1885 — India
- Heteropoda fischeri Jäger, 2005 — India
- Heteropoda flavocephala Merian, 1911 — Sulawesi
- Heteropoda furva Thorell, 1890 — Malaysia
- Heteropoda garciai Barrion & Litsinger, 1995 — Philippines
- Heteropoda gemella Simon, 1877 — Philippines
- Heteropoda goonaneman Davies, 1994 — Queensland
- Heteropoda gordonensis Davies, 1994 — Queensland
- Heteropoda gourae Monga, Sadana & Singh, 1988 — India
- Heteropoda grooteeylandt Davies, 1994 — Northern Territory
- Heteropoda gyirongensis Hu & Li, 1987 — China
- Heteropoda hampsoni Pocock, 1901 — India
- Heteropoda helge Jäger, 2008 — China
- Heteropoda hermitis (Hogg, 1914) — Western Australia
- Heteropoda hildebrandti Jäger, 2008 — Molucca Islands
- Heteropoda hillerae Davies, 1994 — Queensland
- Heteropoda hippie Jäger, 2008 — Sumatra
- Heteropoda hirsti Jäger, 2008 — New Guinea
- Heteropoda holoventris Davies, 1994 — Queensland
- Heteropoda homstu Jäger, 2008 — Sumatra, Java, Borneo
- Heteropoda hosei Pocock, 1897 — Borneo
- Heteropoda hupingensis Peng & Yin, 2001 — China
- Heteropoda ignichelis (Simon, 1880) — Vietnam
- Heteropoda imbecilla Thorell, 1892 — Malaysia, Sumatra
- Heteropoda jacobii Strand, 1911 — New Guinea
- Heteropoda jaegerorum Jäger, 2008 — Singapore, Sumatra
- Heteropoda jasminae Jäger, 2008 — Vietnam
- Heteropoda javana (Simon, 1880) — Malaysia, Java, Sumatra
- Heteropoda jiangxiensis Li, 1991 — China
- Heteropoda jugulans (L. Koch, 1876) — Queensland
- Heteropoda kabaenae Strand, 1911 — Bismarck Archipel
- Heteropoda kalbarri Davies, 1994 — Western Australia
- Heteropoda kandiana Pocock, 1899 — India, Sri Lanka
- Heteropoda kuekenthali Pocock, 1897 — Moluccas
- Heteropoda kuluensis Sethi & Tikader, 1988 — India
- Heteropoda kusi Jäger, 2014 — Borneo
- Heteropoda laai Jäger, 2008 — Singapore, Sumatra
- Heteropoda languida Simon, 1887 — Myanmar
- Heteropoda lashbrooki (Hogg, 1922) — Vietnam
- Heteropoda lentula Pocock, 1901 — India
- Heteropoda leprosa Simon, 1884 — India, Myanmar, Malaysia
- Heteropoda leptoscelis Thorell, 1892 — Sumatra
- Heteropoda lindbergi Roewer, 1962 — Afghanistan
- Heteropoda listeri Pocock, 1900 — Christmas Islands
- Heteropoda loderstaedti Jäger, 2008 — Malaysia, Sumatra
- Heteropoda longipes (L. Koch, 1875) — New South Wales
- Heteropoda lunula (Doleschall, 1857) — India to Vietnam, Malaysia, Singapore, Java, Sumatra, Borneo
- Heteropoda luwuensis Merian, 1911 — Sulawesi
- Heteropoda malitiosa Simon, 1906 — India
- Heteropoda marillana Davies, 1994 — Western Australia
- Heteropoda martinae Jäger, 2008 — Sumatra
- Heteropoda martusa Jäger, 2000 — Sumatra
- Heteropoda maukin Jäger, 2014 — Borneo
- Heteropoda maxima Jäger, 2001 — Laos
- Heteropoda mecistopus Pocock, 1898 — Solomon Islands
- Heteropoda mediocris Simon, 1880 — Java, New Guinea
- Heteropoda meriani Jäger, 2008 — Sulawesi
- Heteropoda merkarensis Strand, 1907 — India
- Heteropoda meticulosa Simon, 1880 — Peru
- Heteropoda minahassae Merian, 1911 — Sulawesi
- Heteropoda mindiptanensis Chrysanthus, 1965 — New Guinea
- Heteropoda modiglianii Thorell, 1890 — Java
- Heteropoda monroei Davies, 1994 — Queensland
- Heteropoda montana Thorell, 1890 — Sumatra
- Heteropoda monteithi Davies, 1994 — Queensland
- Heteropoda mossman Davies, 1994 — Queensland
- Heteropoda murina (Pocock, 1897) — Borneo
- Heteropoda muscicapa Strand, 1911 — New Guinea
- Heteropoda nagarigoon Davies, 1994 — Queensland, New South Wales
- Heteropoda natans Jäger, 2005 — Borneo
- Heteropoda nebulosa Thorell, 1890 — Malaysia
- Heteropoda nigriventer Pocock, 1897 — Sulawesi
- Heteropoda nilgirina Pocock, 1901 — India
- Heteropoda ninahagen Jäger, 2008 — Malaysia
- Heteropoda nirounensis (Simon, 1903) — India, Sumatra
- Heteropoda nobilis (L. Koch, 1875) — New Hebrides, Australia, Polynesia
- Heteropoda novaguineensis Strand, 1911 — New Guinea
- Heteropoda nyalama Hu & Li, 1987 — China
- Heteropoda obe Jäger, 2014 — Sulawesi
- Heteropoda obtusa Thorell, 1890 — Borneo
- Heteropoda ocyalina (Simon, 1887) — Java, Sumatra
- Heteropoda onoi Jäger, 2008 — Vietnam
- Heteropoda opo Jäger, 2014 — Myanmar
- Heteropoda pakawini Jäger, 2008 — Thailand
- Heteropoda parva Jäger, 2000 — Malaysia, Sumatra
- Heteropoda pedata Strand, 1907 — India
  - Heteropoda pedata magna Strand, 1909 — India
- Heteropoda pekkai Jäger, 2014 — Bhutan
- Heteropoda phasma Simon, 1897 — India
- Heteropoda pingtungensis Zhu & Tso, 2006 — China, Taiwan
- Heteropoda planiceps (Pocock, 1897) — Moluccas
- Heteropoda plebeja Thorell, 1887 — Myanmar
- Heteropoda pressula Simon, 1886 — Vietnam
- Heteropoda procera (L. Koch, 1867) — Queensland, New South Wales
- Heteropoda raveni Davies, 1994 — Queensland
- Heteropoda reinholdae Jäger, 2008 — Sumatra
- Heteropoda renibulbis Davies, 1994 — Western Australia, Northern Territory, Queensland
- Heteropoda richlingi Jäger, 2008 — Sumatra, Java
- Heteropoda robusta Fage, 1924 — India
- Heteropoda rosea Karsch, 1879 — Colombia
- Heteropoda rubra Chrysanthus, 1965 — New Guinea
- Heteropoda rundle Davies, 1994 — Queensland
- Heteropoda ruricola Thorell, 1881 — New Guinea
- Heteropoda sarotoides Järvi, 1914 — New Guinea
- Heteropoda sartrix (L. Koch, 1865) — Australia
- Heteropoda schlaginhaufeni Strand, 1911 — New Guinea
- Heteropoda schwalbachorum Jäger, 2008 — China
- Heteropoda schwendingeri Jäger, 2005 — Thailand
- Heteropoda sexpunctata Simon, 1885 — India, Malaysia
- Heteropoda signata Thorell, 1890 — Sumatra
- Heteropoda silvatica Davies, 1994 — Queensland
- Heteropoda simoneallmannae (Jäger, 2018) — Philippines (Palawan)
- Heteropoda simplex Jäger & Ono, 2000 — Laos, Ryukyu Islands
- Heteropoda speciosus (Pocock, 1898) — Solomon Islands
- Heteropoda spenceri Davies, 1994 — Northern Territory
- Heteropoda spinipes (Pocock, 1897) — Moluccas
- Heteropoda spurgeon Davies, 1994 — Queensland
- Heteropoda squamacea Wang, 1990 — China
- Heteropoda steineri Bayer & Jäger, 2009 — Laos
- Heteropoda strandi Jäger, 2002 — Sumatra
- Heteropoda strasseni Strand, 1915 — Java
- Heteropoda striata Merian, 1911 — Sulawesi
- Heteropoda striatipes (Leardi, 1902) — India
- Heteropoda submaculata Thorell, 1881 — New Guinea
  - Heteropoda submaculata torricelliana Strand, 1911 — New Guinea
- Heteropoda subplebeia Strand, 1907 — India
- Heteropoda subtilis Karsch, 1891 — Sri Lanka
- Heteropoda sumatrana Thorell, 1890 — Sumatra
  - Heteropoda sumatrana javacola Strand, 1907 — Java
- Heteropoda teranganica Strand, 1911 — Aru Islands
- Heteropoda tetrica Thorell, 1897 — China to Sumatra
- Heteropoda udolindenberg Jäger, 2008 — Sumatra
- Heteropoda uexkuelli Jäger, 2008 — Bali
- Heteropoda umbrata Karsch, 1891 — Sri Lanka
- Heteropoda variegata (Simon, 1874) — Greece to Israel
- Heteropoda venatoria (Linnaeus, 1767) — Pantropical
  - Heteropoda venatoria emarginata Thorell, 1881 — Sumatra
  - Heteropoda venatoria foveolata Thorell, 1881 — New Guinea, Yule Islands
- Heteropoda vespersa Davies, 1994 — Queensland
- Heteropoda warrumbungle Davies, 1994 — New South Wales
- Heteropoda willunga Davies, 1994 — Queensland
- Heteropoda zuviele Jäger, 2008 — Vietnam
