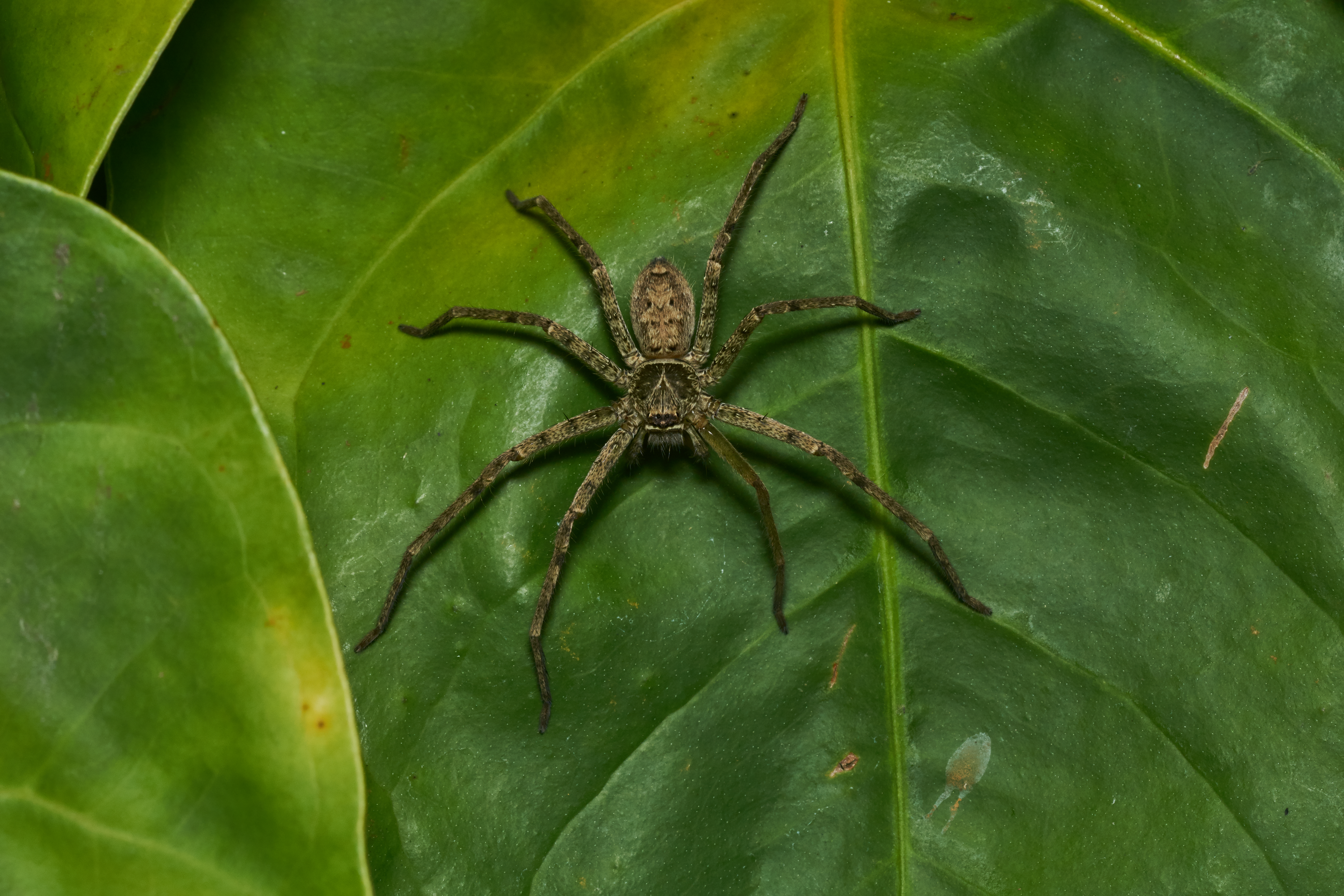
- Male

Scientific classification
- Kingdom: Animalia
- Phylum: Arthropoda
- Subphylum: Chelicerata
- Class: Arachnida
- Order: Araneae
- Infraorder: Araneomorphae
- Family: Sparassidae
- Genus: Heteropoda
- Species: H. venatoria

Binomial name
- Heteropoda venatoria Linnaeus, 1767

Synonyms
- List: Aranea pallens; Aranea regia; Aranea venatoria; Helicops maderiana; Heteropoda ferina; Heteropoda ocellata; Heteropoda regia; Heteropoda shimen; Micrommata setulosa; Ocypete bruneiceps; Ocypete draco; Ocypete murina; Ocypete pallens; Ocypete setulosa; Olios albifrons; Olios antillianus; Olios colombianus; Olios freycineti; Olios gabonensis; Olios javensis; Olios leucosius; Olios lunula; Olios maderianus; Olius regius; Olius setulosus; Olios zonatus; Palystes ledleyi; Palystes maderianus; Sarotes regius; Sarotes venatorius; Sinopoda venatoria; Sparassus ammanita; Thomisus leucosius

= Heteropoda venatoria =

Species of spider

Heteropoda venatoria is a species of spider in the family Sparassidae, the huntsman spiders. It is native to the tropical regions of the world, and it is present in some subtropical areas as an introduced species. Its common names include giant crab spider, pantropical huntsman spider, cane spider, African Huntsman Spider, or giant mombasa spider .

== Description ==
Adults have a flat, brown body 2.2 to 2.8 cm (0.87 to 1.10 in) long, with leg spans of 7 to 10 cm (2.8 to 3.9 in). The female may be slightly larger than the male, particularly in the abdomen, but the male has longer legs and larger tips on its pedipalps. The clypeus, the area just in front of the eyes, is cream or yellowish, and the carapace behind the eyes has a wide band which is usually tan in the female and cream in the male. The body is not very hairy, but the legs have erectile setae, each of which is marked with a black dot.

== Biology ==
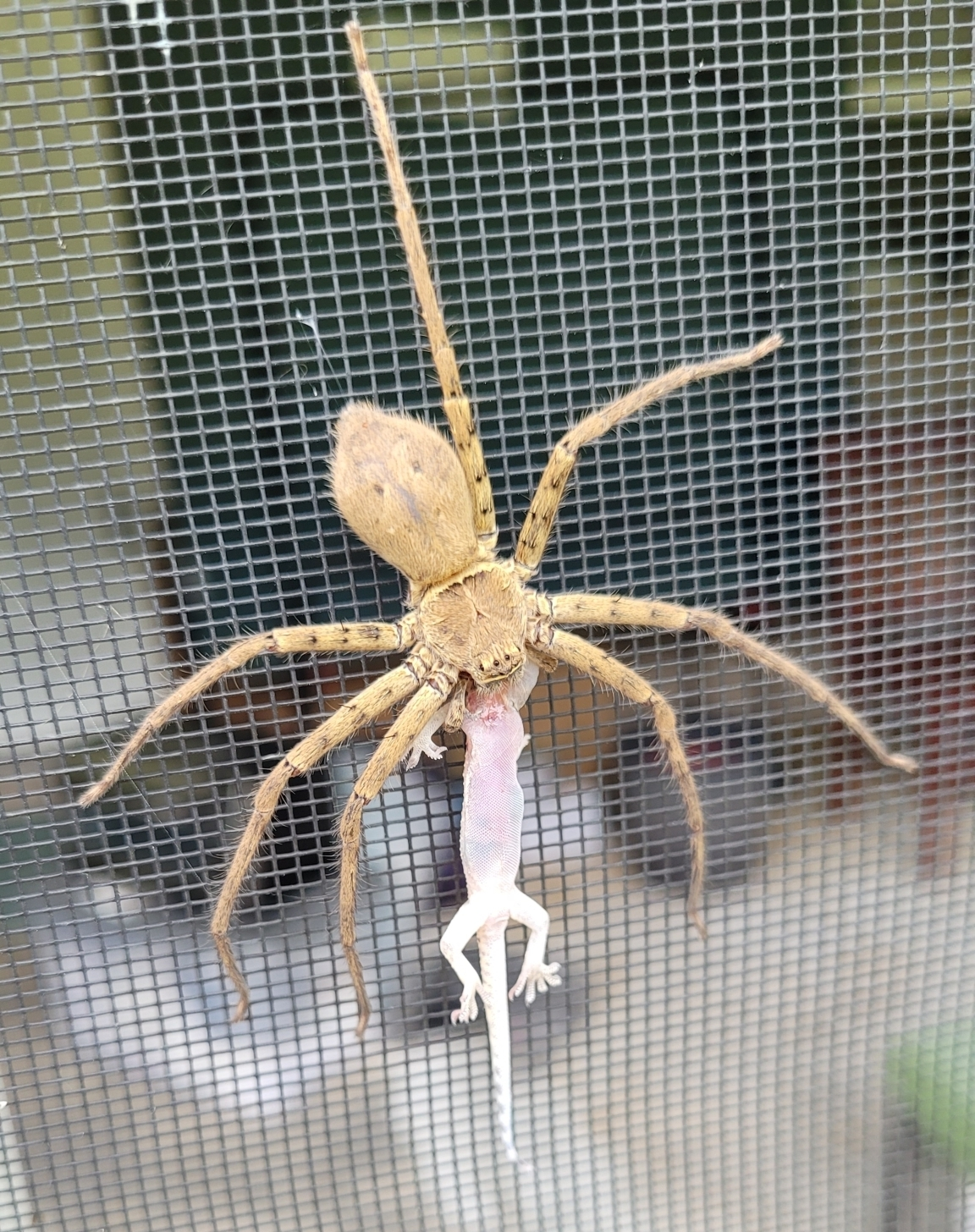
Eating a Mediterranean house gecko

Females produce an egg sac up to about 2.5 centimeters wide, carrying it with their pedipalps under the body. Egg sacs are variable in size, usually containing over 100 eggs, with larger ones holding over 400. The spiderlings undergo their first molt while still in the sac. In one small laboratory sample, the life span of the male averaged 465 days, and that of the female was 580 days.

As part of its courtship behavior, the male produces a sound by vibrating its abdomen while keeping its feet firmly planted. This is faintly audible to humans as a "buzz" or "hum".

The spider is not considered dangerous, but it does deliver enough venom to give a painful bite.

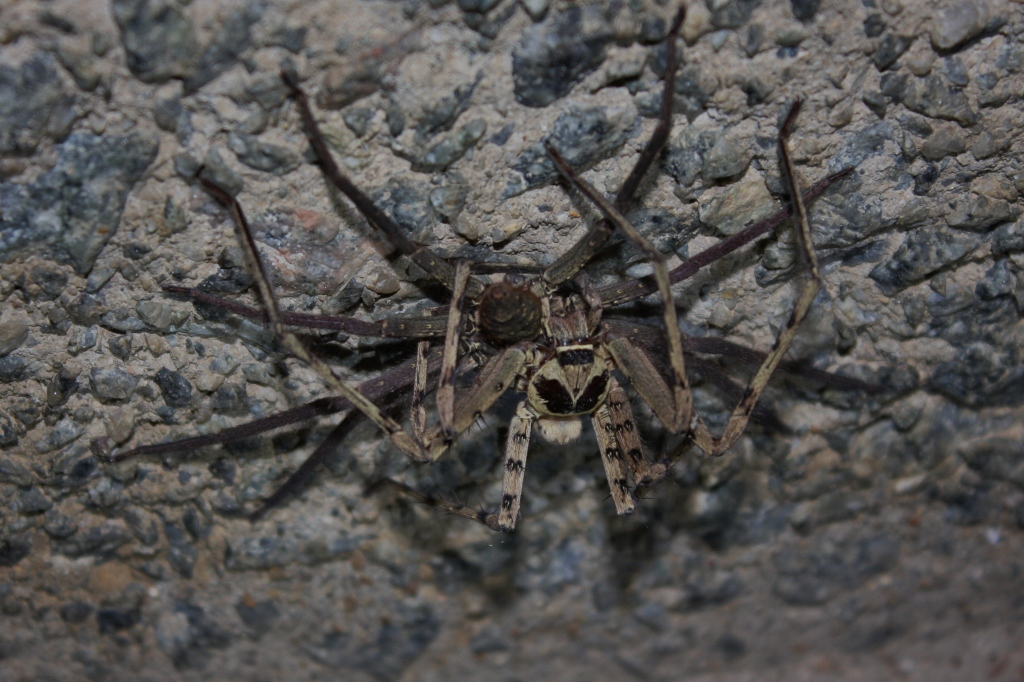
Mating

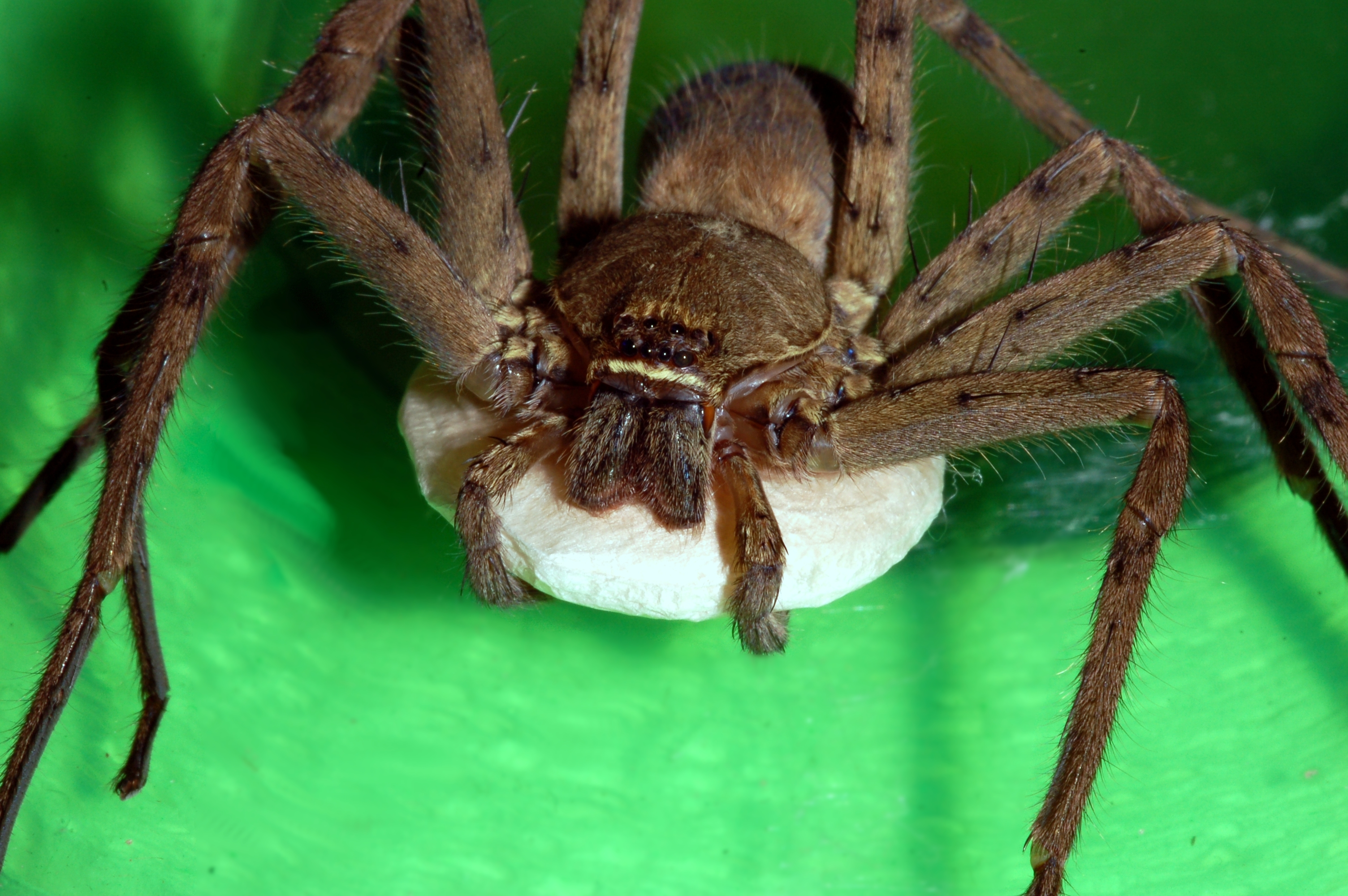
Female with egg sac

== Prey ==
The spider feeds on insects, which includes various species of butterflies and moths such as Deilephila elpenor. The spider captures them directly instead of spinning webs. After capturing its prey, the spider injects them with venom. The venom of this spider contains the toxin HpTX2, a potassium channel blocker. In some tropical areas the spider is considered a useful resident of households because of its efficient consumption of pest insects. It commonly lives in houses and other structures such as barns and sheds, especially in areas that experience cold temperatures. It is sensitive to cold and can live outdoors only in warmer climates. In Bermuda, where they are mostly found indoors, they are generally called house spiders (which may cause its identity to be confused with the Southern house spider), or sometimes wolf spiders (Not to be confused with Lycosidae, which are also called wolf spiders.)

Besides insects it has been known to prey on scorpions and bats.

== Gallery ==
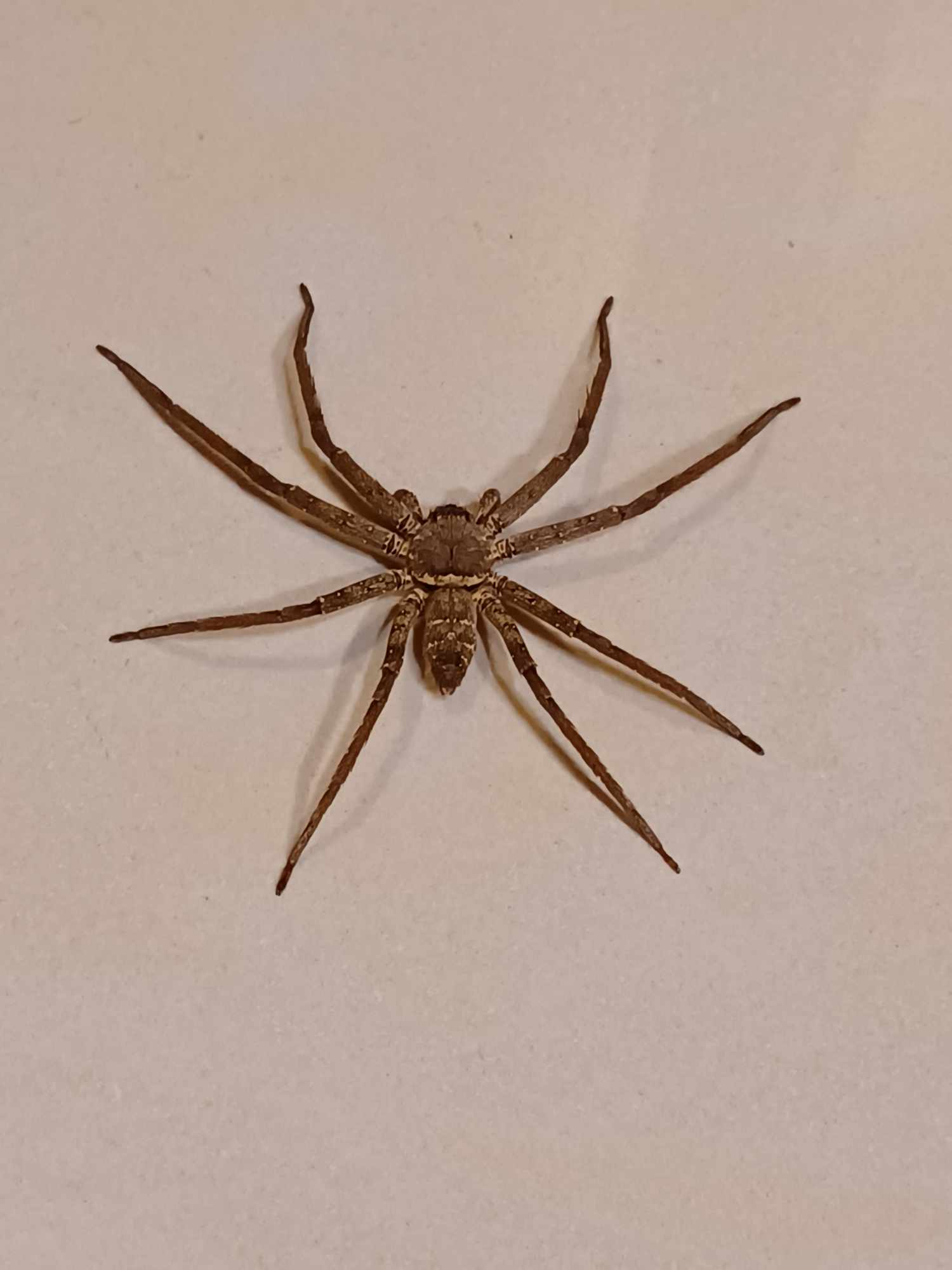
Female

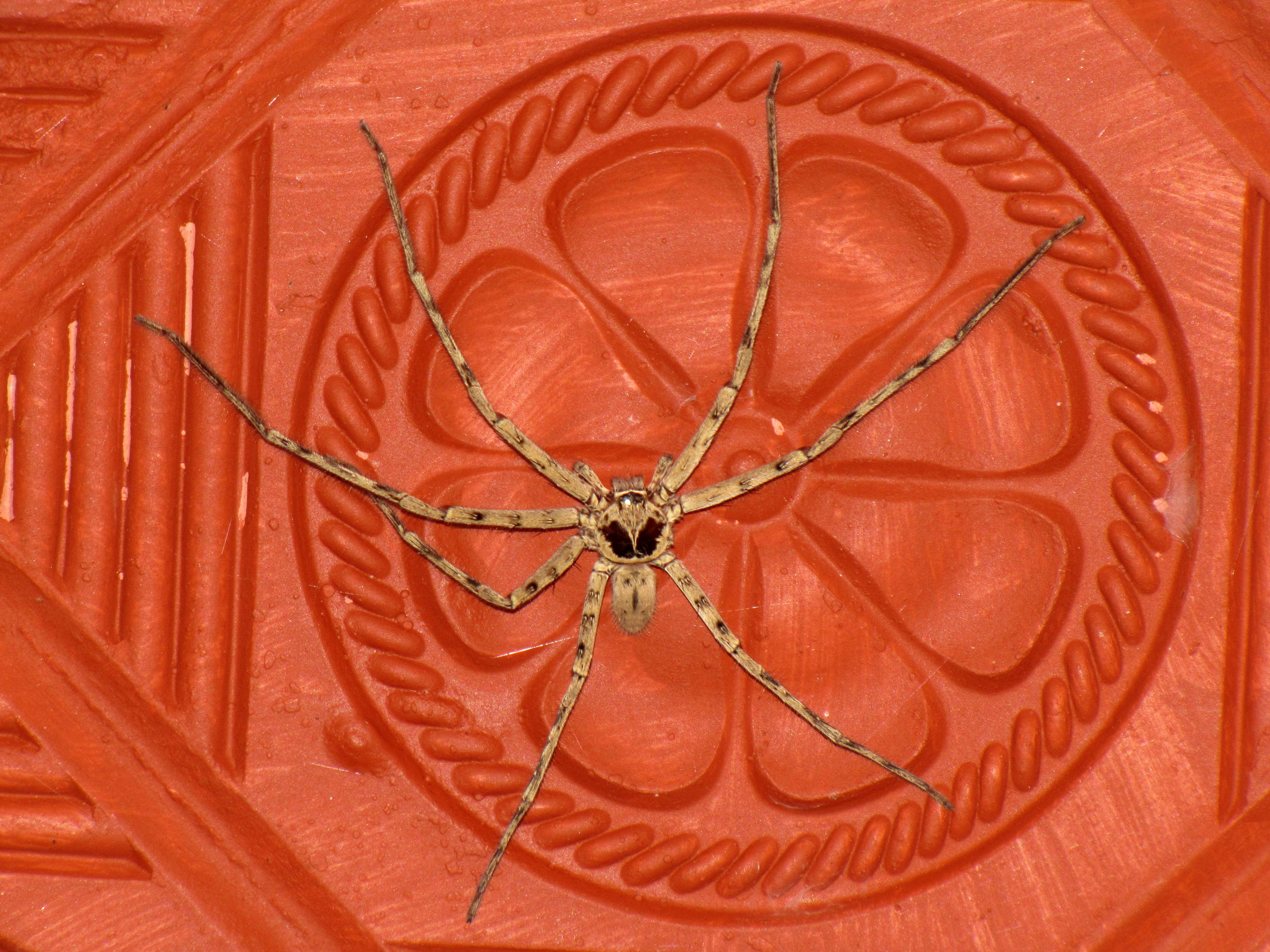
Male

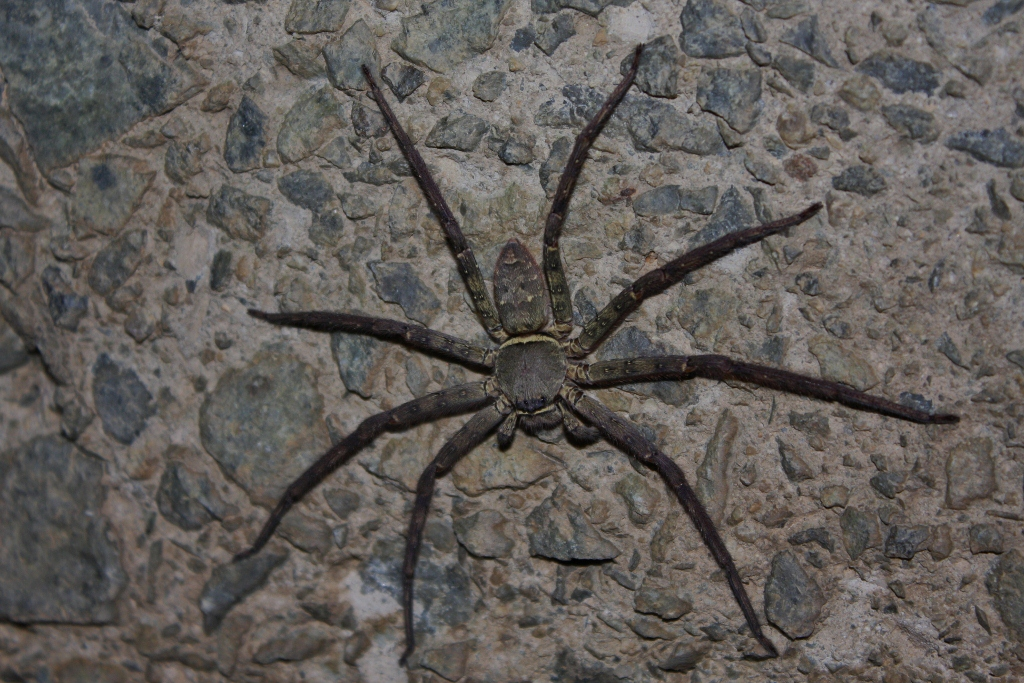
Female

Crawling on a wall

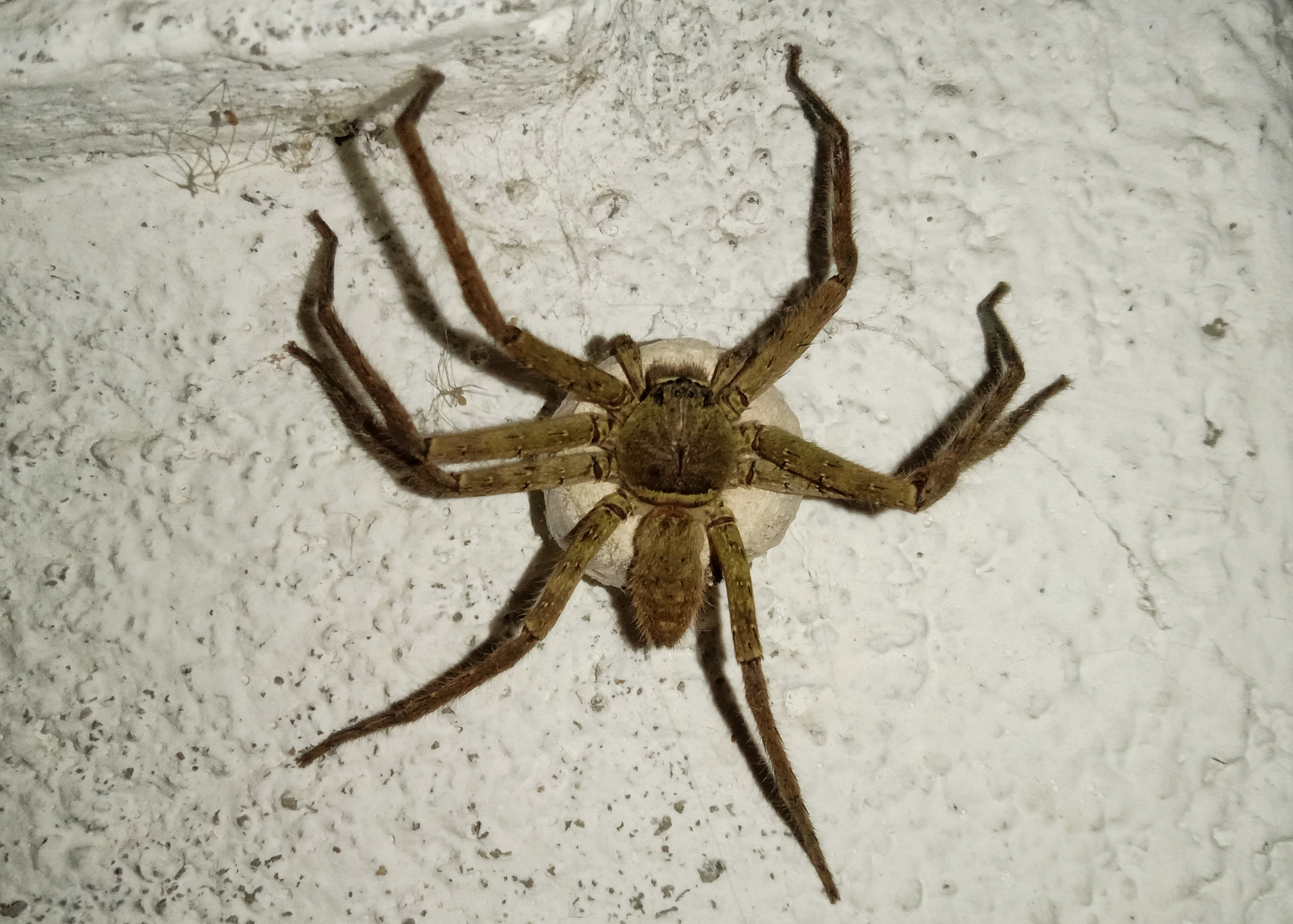
Female with egg sac, in India.
