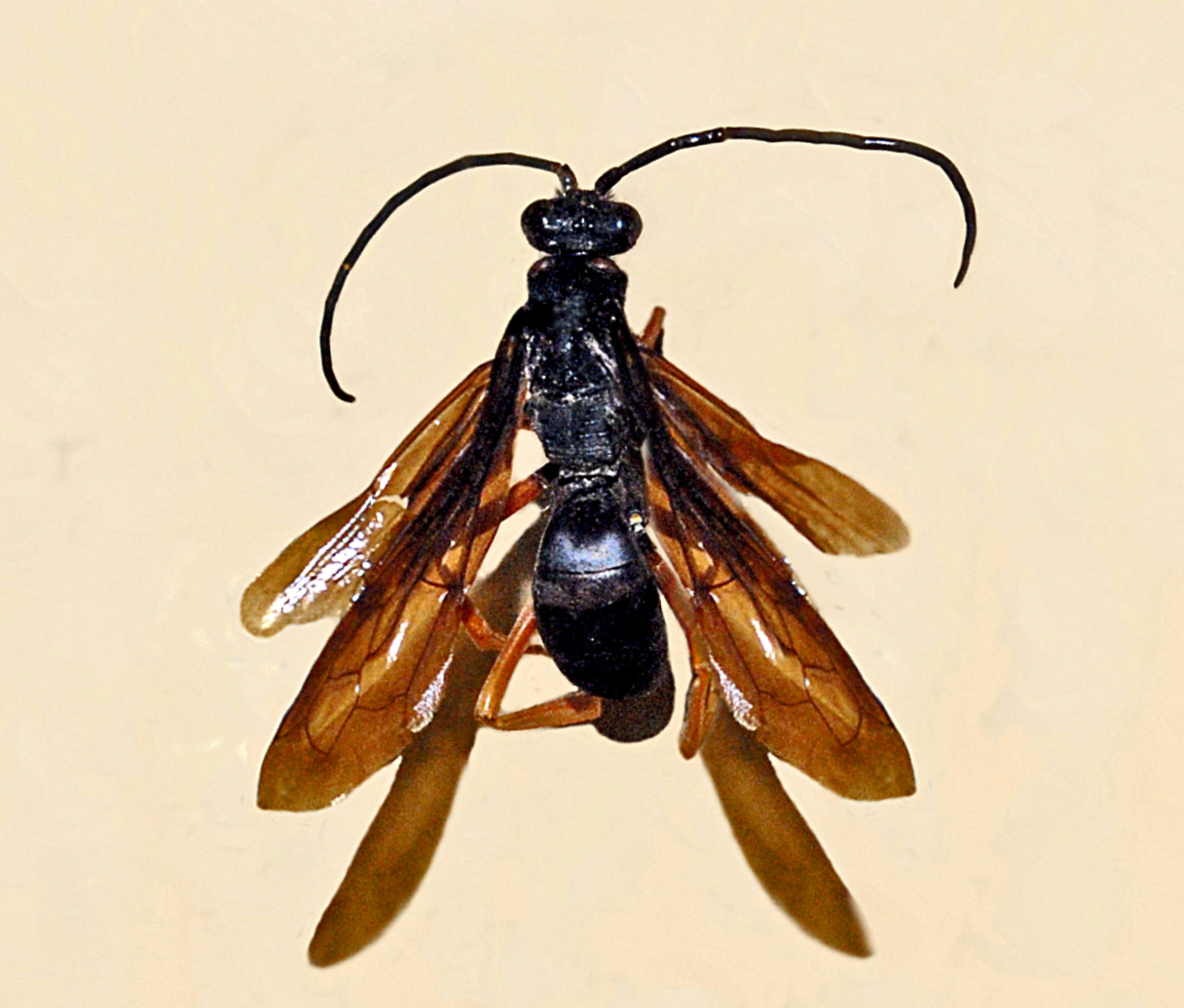
- Cyphononyx optimus

Scientific classification
- Domain: Eukaryota
- Kingdom: Animalia
- Phylum: Arthropoda
- Class: Insecta
- Order: Hymenoptera
- Family: Pompilidae
- Subfamily: Pepsinae
- Genus: Cyphononyx; Dahlbom, 1845

Type species
- Sphex falvicornis Fabricius, 1781

Synonyms
- Cyphonyx Fox, 1896

= Cyphononyx =

Genus of wasps

Cyphononyx is a genus of spider hunting wasps in the family Pompilidae.

== Selected species ==
The following species are listed as belonging to this genus:

- Cyphononyx abyssinicus Gribodo, 1879
- Cyphononyx aeneipennis H. Lucas, 1898
- Cyphononyx anguliferus (H. Lucas, 1897)
- Cyphononyx antarcticus (Linnaeus, 1767)
- Cyphononyx antennatus (Smith, 1855)
- Cyphononyx apicalis (Saussure, 1891)
- Cyphononyx auropubens Arnold, 1932
- Cyphononyx bipartitus (Lepeletier, 1845)
- Cyphononyx bretonii (Guérin, 1844)
- Cyphononyx camerunensis Tullgren, 1904
- Cyphononyx castaneus (Klug, 1834)
- Cyphononyx claggi Banks, 1934
- Cyphononyx confusus Dahlbom, 1845
- Cyphononyx decipiens (Smith, 1855)
- Cyphononyx decoratus Saussure, 1891
- Cyphononyx fatalis (Gerstaecker, 1857)
- Cyphononyx fulvognathus (Rohwer, 1911)
- Cyphononyx gowdeyi (Turner, 1918)
- Cyphononyx grandidieri Saussure, 1887
- Cyphononyx madecassus Saussure, 1887
- Cyphononyx muelleri Saussure, 1890
- Cyphononyx nyasicus Arnold, 1932
- Cyphononyx obscurus (Smith, 1855)
- Cyphononyx optimus (Smith, 1855)
- Cyphononyx pan Arnold, 1932
- Cyphononyx parvulus Banks, 1941
- Cyphononyx plebejus (Saussure, 1868)
- Cyphononyx promontorii Arnold, 1932
- Cyphononyx purpureipennis Arnold, 1948
- Cyphononyx rathjensi Wahis, 2000
- Cyphononyx subauratus Turner, 1918
- Cyphononyx umtaliensis Arnold, 1932
- Cyphononyx usambarensis H. Lucas, 1898
- Cyphononyx ustus Haupt, 1933
