= Sikorsky S-70 =

Family of medium transport/utility military helicopters

S-70/H-60 series
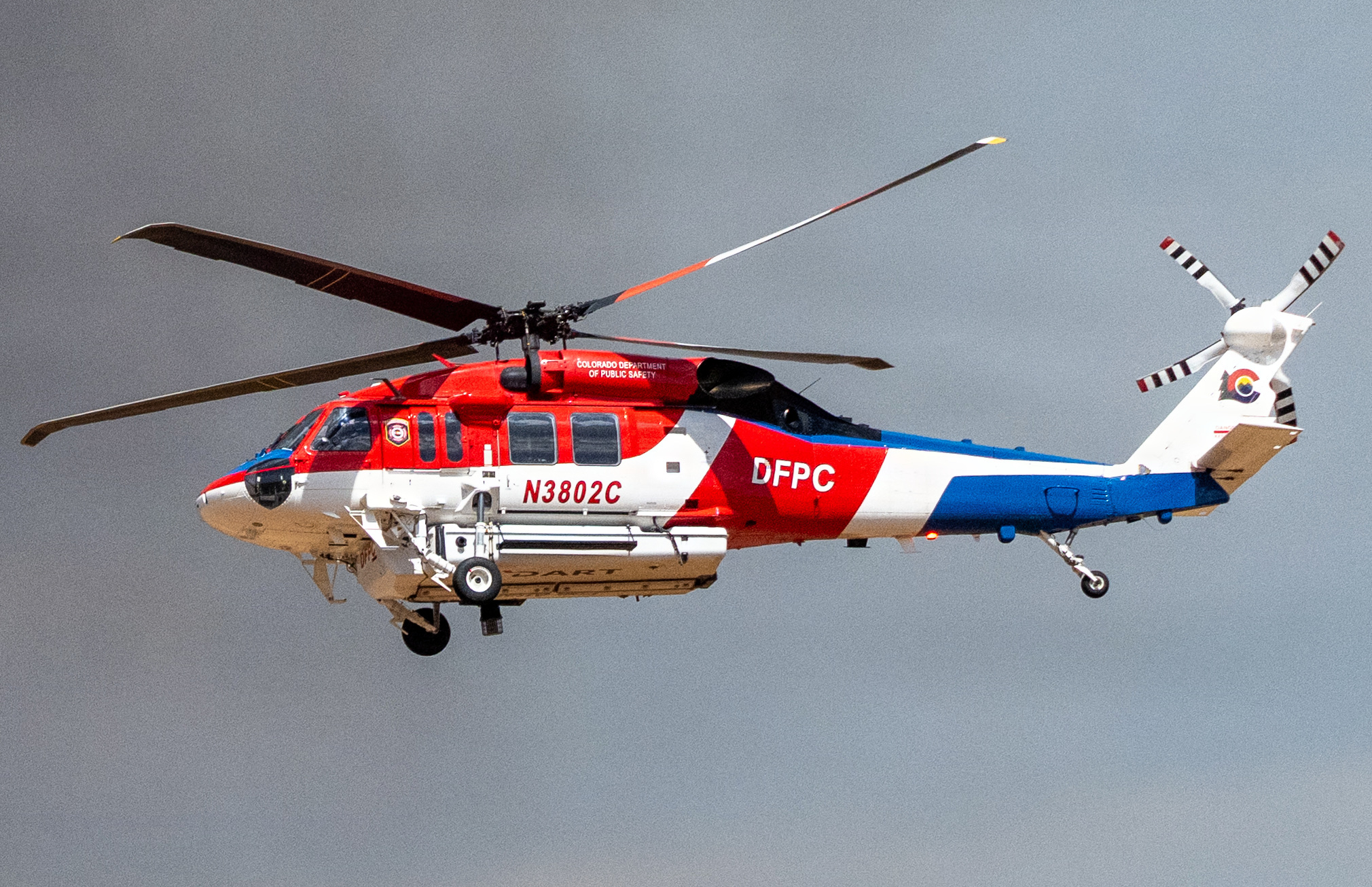
- CDPS S-70i Firehawk during the Ferris Fire

General information
- Type: Medium-lift transport/utility helicopter
- Manufacturer: Sikorsky Aircraft
- Status: In service
- Primary users: U.S. Customs and Border Protection U.S. Drug Enforcement Administration; See Operators section for others

History
- Manufactured: 1970s–present
- Introduction date: 1979
- First flight: October 1974
- Variants: Sikorsky UH-60 Black Hawk; Sikorsky SH-60 Seahawk; Sikorsky HH-60 Pave Hawk; Sikorsky MH-60 Jayhawk; Mitsubishi H-60
- Developed into: Sikorsky S-92

The Sikorsky S-70 is an American medium transport/utility helicopter family manufactured by Sikorsky Aircraft. It was developed for the United States Army in the 1970s, winning a competition to be designated the UH-60 Black Hawk and spawning a large family in U.S. military service. New and improved versions of the UH-60 have been developed since. Civilian versions, and some military versions, are produced under various S-70 model designations.

== Development ==
The Sikorsky S-70 family was developed to meet a United States Army requirement to replace the UH-1 Iroquois family of utility medium-lift helicopters in 1972. Three YUH-60A prototypes were constructed, with the first flying in October 1974. They were evaluated against the Boeing Vertol YUH-61A. The YUH-60A was selected for production, and entered service as the UH-60A Black Hawk with the U.S. Army in 1979.

After entering service, the helicopter was modified for new missions and roles, including mine laying and medical evacuation. An EH-60 variant was developed to conduct electronic warfare and special operations aviation developed the MH-60 variant to support its missions. In the late 1980s the model was upgraded to the UH-60L, which featured more power and lift with the upgrade to the -701C model of the GE T700 engine. The improved UH-60M model was developed in the early 2000s. The UH-60M and its International version, the S-70i, include GPS navigation, a glass cockpit, an integrated Flight Management System, and a significant upgrade to the powertrain and rotor system adding both power and lift capability.

The S-70 can perform a variety of missions, including air cavalry, electronic warfare, and aeromedical evacuation. Versions are used to transport the President of the United States under call sign "Marine One". In air assault operations it can move a squad of 11 combat troops and equipment or carry the 105 mm M102 howitzer, thirty rounds of ammunition, and a six-man crew. Alternatively, it can carry 2,600 lb (1,200 kg) of cargo or sling load 9,000 lb (4,100 kg) of cargo. The S-70 is equipped with advanced avionics and electronics, such as the Global Positioning System.

The United States Navy received the first navalized SH-60B Seahawk in 1983, and the SH-60F Ocean Hawk in 1988.

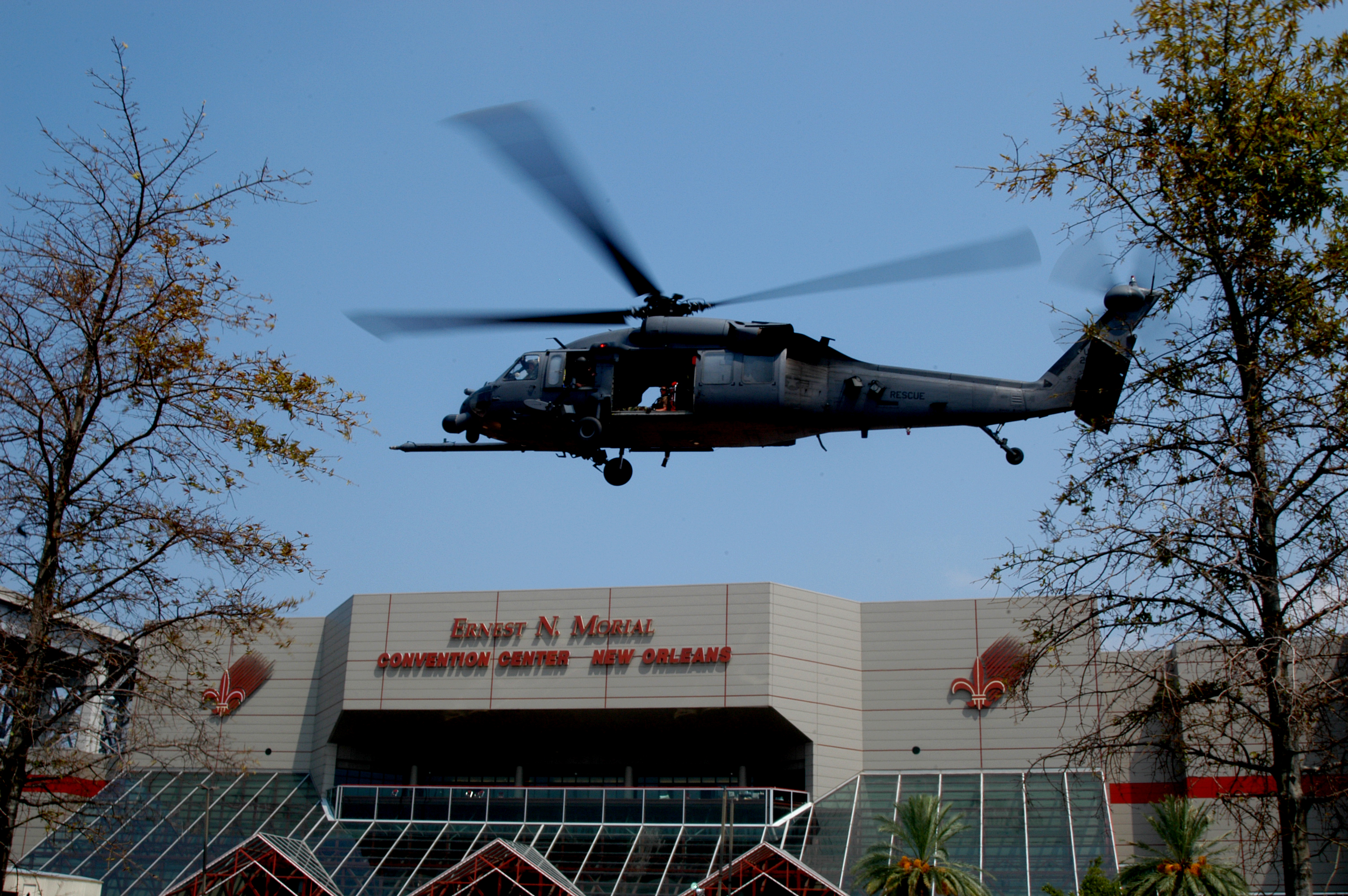
HH-60G Pave Hawk conducting rescue ops in 2005

The HH-60G Pave Hawk is a highly modified version of the S-70 primarily designed to recover downed aircrew or other isolated personnel during war and equipped with a rescue hoist with a 250 ft (76 m) cable that has a 600 lb (270 kg) lift capability, and a retractable in-flight refueling probe. The United States Air Force received the MH-60G Pave Hawk in 1982.

The United States Coast Guard received the HH-60J Jayhawk in 1992. It utilizes the equipment of the HH-60G Pave Hawk on the navalized SH-60 platform.

The S-70A Firehawk is a version of the S-70 designed for firefighting, rescue, medical evacuation, and external lift of bulky cargo and equipment. The Oregon National Guard was the first military organization in the world to add the Firehawk to its inventory; the Los Angeles County Fire Department was the first municipal organization. Another Firehawk aerial firefighting operator is the California Department of Forestry and Fire Protection (CAL FIRE) with the S-70i variant.

The Army flies medical evacuation models configured as rotary winged medical suites. It also uses the S-70 for special operations by the 160th Special Operations Aviation Regiment ("Night Stalkers") at Fort Campbell, Kentucky, designated as the MH-60K.

The Maple Hawk was a variant offered by Sikorsky to the Canadian Forces during a 1996 tender to replace the military's search and rescue helicopters.

== Operational history ==
=== Colombia ===
On 5 August 2010, to support its counter-narcotics and armed forces modernisation efforts, the US DSCA approved the Colombian government's request of additional 9 UH-60L (4 units allocated to the national police force).

In 2017 March, the National Police of Colombia ordered 10 additional 2nd-hand UH-60A helicopters that will increase their total to 19 helicopters in operation.

=== Poland ===
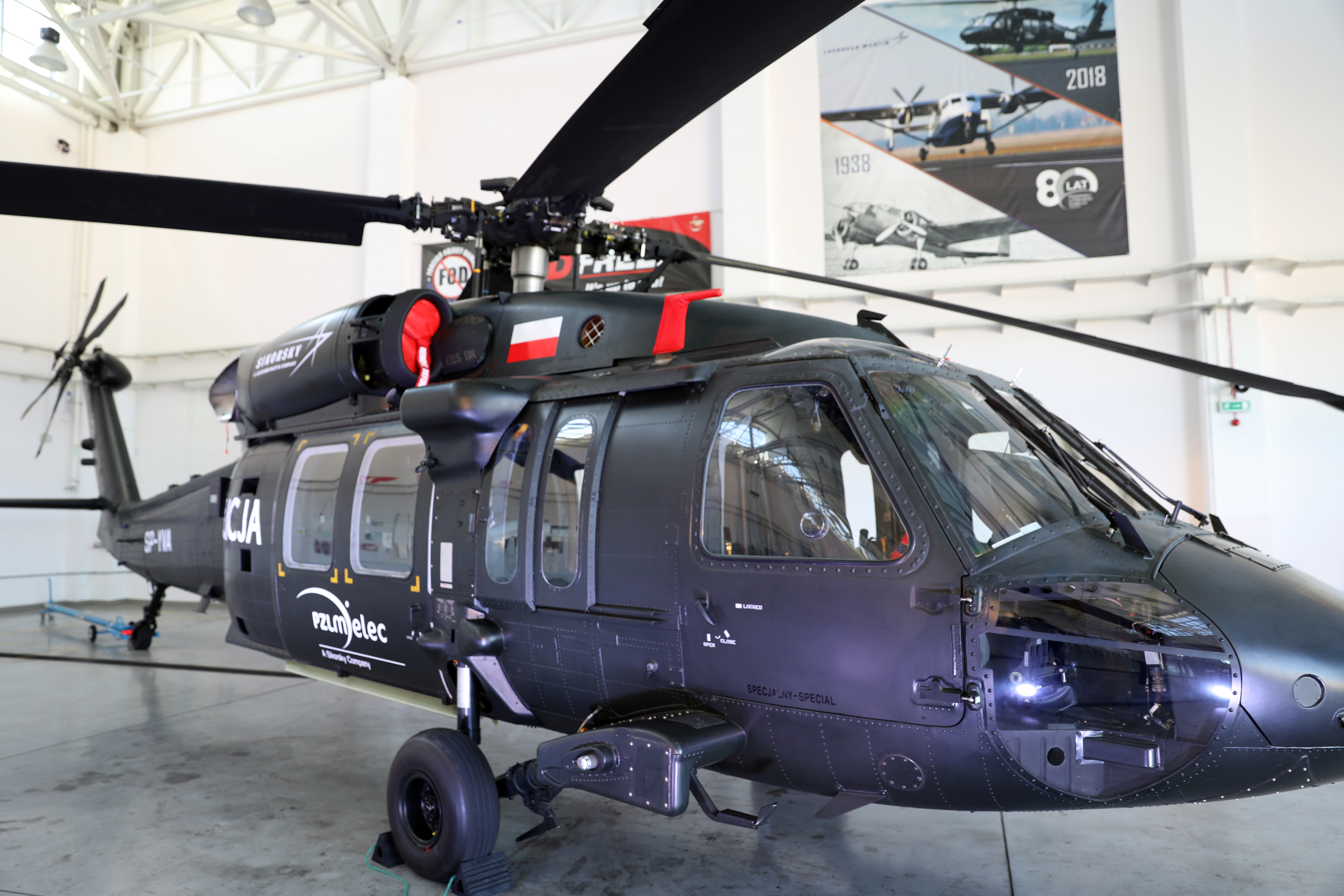
S-70 for Polish Police, 2018

In 2018, Poland signed an agreement to buy S-70is for Police aviation, to replace Mi-2s reaching the end of their safe flying life.

=== Romania ===
In 2021, Romania purchased S-70M Black Hawk helicopters through the VISION 2020 European Union program. Under the EU-funded program, up to 12 Black Hawks build by PZL Mielec are to be acquired. The first seven S-70M helicopters were delivered in 2023, of which six configured for SMURD and one for the Romanian Police. In December 2025, Romania received a Black Hawk helicopter funded through the RescEU program. This helicopter will be used to also intervene during major conflicts in other European countries, at the request of the European Union. The helicopters are operated by the General Inspectorate of Aviation.

=== Peru ===
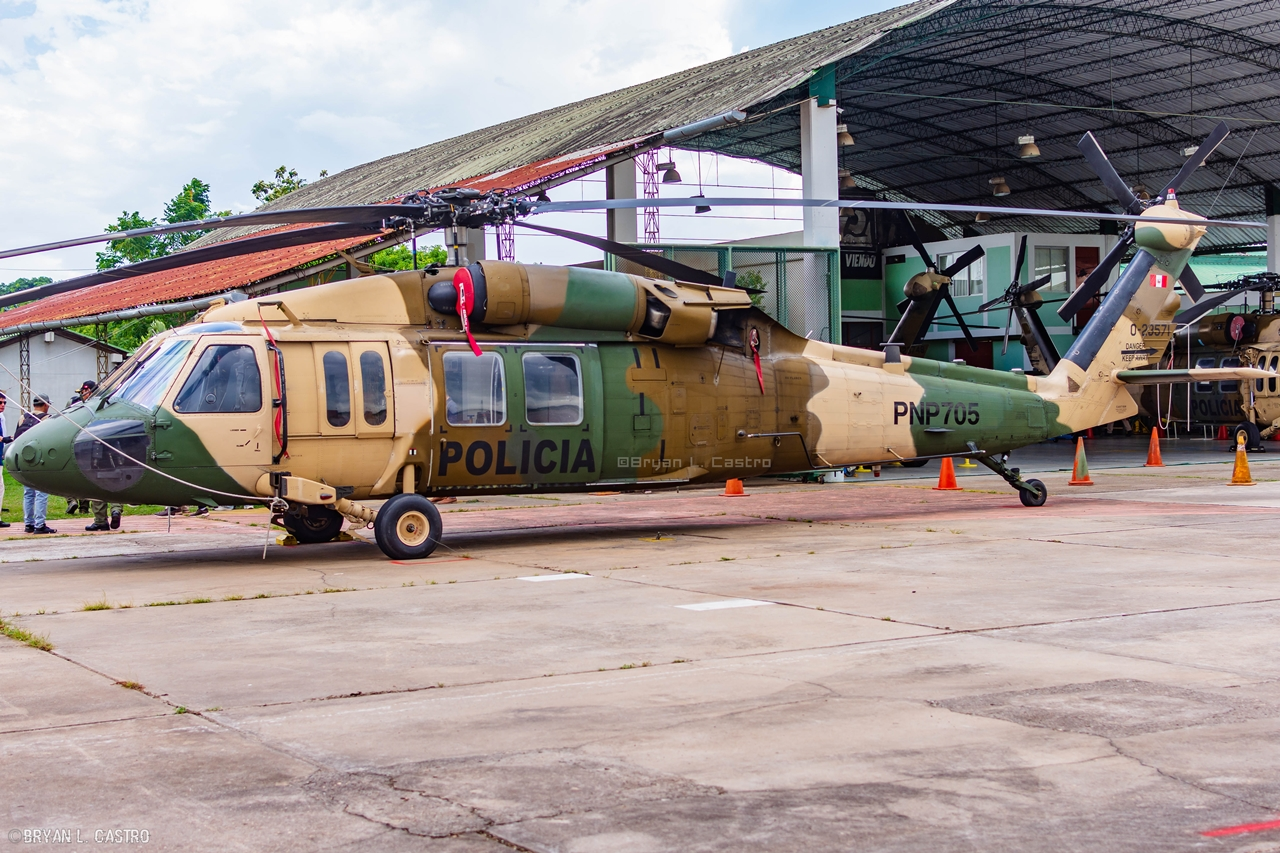
UH-60A+ / PNP-705 / Policía Nacional del Perú

The Peruvian National Police received its first UH-60A in November 2024. These aircraft arrived to replace the older UH-1 Huey helicopters used primarily for anti-drug operations and were assigned to the Pucallpa Police Aviation Base, which is emerging as their main operational center and where some UH-1H Huey II helicopters remain in service.

Two of the aircraft are UH-60A models, previously operated by the Department of State Air Wing (DOSAW), while the remaining four are UH-60A+, a variant developed to provide foreign forces with capabilities equivalent to those of the UH-60L. These four UH-60A+ aircraft retain the desert camouflage scheme used by the Afghan Air Force's Black Hawks that were originally intended for that country.

=== Philippines ===
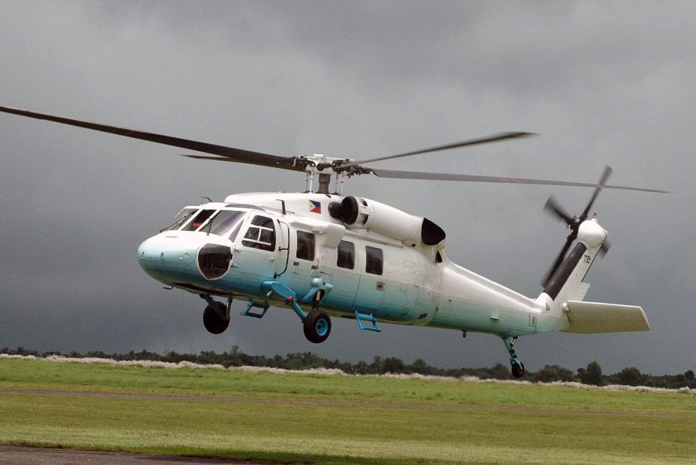
A Philippine S-70-A5 VIP of the Presidential Airlift Wing

2 S-70-A5 VIP helicopters purchased 1983 and was delivered in 1984, this Blackhawk served the 250th PAW for more than 3 decades as a Presidential VVIP transport helicopter. Only 1 remains in service with the 505th Search and Rescue Group.

==== First batch ====
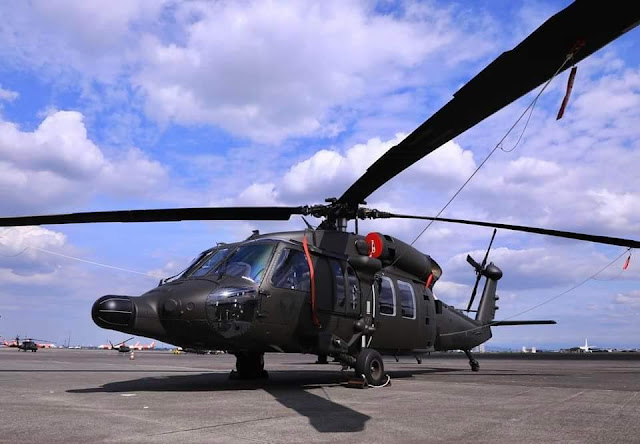
S-70i Black Hawk of the Philippine Air Force, December 2021

As part of the Armed Forces of the Philippines modernization efforts, the Department of National Defense signed a contract with PZL-Mielec for 16 S-70i variant of Black Hawk helicopters worth US$241.4 million in March 2019. This to further replace the Philippine Air Force's aging fleet of UH-1 Huey helicopters. The first six units were delivered in November 2020 while the second five units were delivered in June 2021. The final five units of the first batch were delivered in December 2021.

During a nighttime training mission, one unit of the new S-70i Black Hawk crashed killing all six crew on board. In response, the Philippine Air Force grounded the entire fleet until the investigation has been completed. The Armed Forces of the Philippines later on said that "Based on the investigating team's report, no single factor can be determined as the only cause of these mishaps."

==== Second batch ====
On 22 February 2022, the Department of National Defense signed another contract with PZL-Mielec for an additional 32 S-70i Black Hawks worth US$624 million which included an integrated logistics support and training package for pilots and maintenance crew.

With the latest contract with PZL-Mielec, the Philippines is set to become the largest operator of the S-70i variant of the Black Hawk once full delivery of the ordered units are completed.

=== Failed bids ===
==== India ====
The first tender under the Indian Navy's Multi Role Helicopter (MRH) programme for 16 helicopters was issued in 2006. The same was cancelled and re-issued in September 2008. The acquisition intended to replace the Sea King Mk 42B/C fleet, 40 of which were procured in 1970s. The fleet strength has since reduced to 30 units. The MRH would be deployed for both anti-submarine and anti-surface warfare missions. Sikorsky and NHIndustries submitted their commercial bids in 2009–10. On 17 February 2011, the Indian Defence Ministry announced the rejection of a US offer for direct acquisition of 16 MH-60R Romeo helicopters through the Foreign Military Sales (FMS) route. Instead, the Indian Navy continued with competitive bidding for its MRH tender. This left behind only two contenders — Sikorsky S-70B Seahawk and NHIndustries NH90 — for the MRH tender launched in September 2008. The trials were expected to commence in March 2011. The winning bidder was required to supply the first chopper within 46 months and the rest in three phases. The contract also included an option contract for 44 helicopters. The winning bidder was required to re-invest 30% of the contract value back into the Indian industry as part of the offset obligation.

The trials were concluded in late 2011 and opening of commercial bids were expected shortly afterwards. Sikorsky was the frontrunner for the contract. However, there were delays attributed to NHI's complaint of "undue technical waivers" given to Sikorsky raised in 2011–12. The issues were resolved in 2012-end. Further delays followed after the 2013 Indian helicopter bribery scandal allegations that were raised in February 2013. An Italian firm involved in the allegations, Finmeccanica, had a 32% stake in NHIndustries.

On 29 August 2014, the Indian defence ministry decided to open bids for the MRH contract from the two companies. This would be followed by a larger "IMRH programme" in which Lockheed Martin was keen to field its MH-60R design. The NH90 was eliminated due to NHI's commercial links with Finmeccanica which was then partially banned banned from new tenders since June. The commercial bid for S-70B which was the only vendor in the competition was to be opened on 4 December 2014. On 5 December 2014, Sikorsky, then a subsidiary of United Technologies, announced its selection by the Indian Navy to supply 16 S-70B Seahawk helicopters with an option for eight more in later stages. The proposed variant will include avionics and flexible open architecture Weapons Management Systems integrating an advanced sonar, 360 degree search radar, modern air-to-surface missiles, and torpedoes for the ASW role. The chopper would be equipped with blade and tail fold capability for ship storage. It will also be capable of undertaking non-combat roles including search and rescue, utility and external cargo lift, surveillance and CASEVAC.

However, in June 2017, India's Ministry of Defence terminated the procurement programme on a recommendation by the Cost Negotiation Committee (CNC) of the MoD. The CNC have been in a deadlock due to differences in base pricing issues with Sikorsky since 2014 even after Lockheed Martin took over the firm, as reported to Janes on 15 June 2017.

The Indian defence ministry thereafter approved the purchase of 24 multirole helicopters. As per a November 2018 report by The Indian Express, India had sought the multirole MH-60R from the US and had sent a letter of request in that case. The procurement was expected to cost $2 billion. The Cabinet Committee on Security (CCS), chaired by the Prime Minister of India, cleared the deal for 26 MH-60R Romeo helicopters on 19 February 2020, a week ahead of the visit of Donald Trump, the then POTUS, to India. The programme acted as a stopgap measure until the Navy's requirement of 123 helicopters under the Naval Multi Role Helicopter (NMRH) was fulfilled. India signed a $2.12 billion (₹15,157 crore) deal with the US on 26 February. Over 20 MH-60Rs have been delivered by November 2025, while two squadrons, INAS 334 and INAS 335, having been raised.

== Variants ==
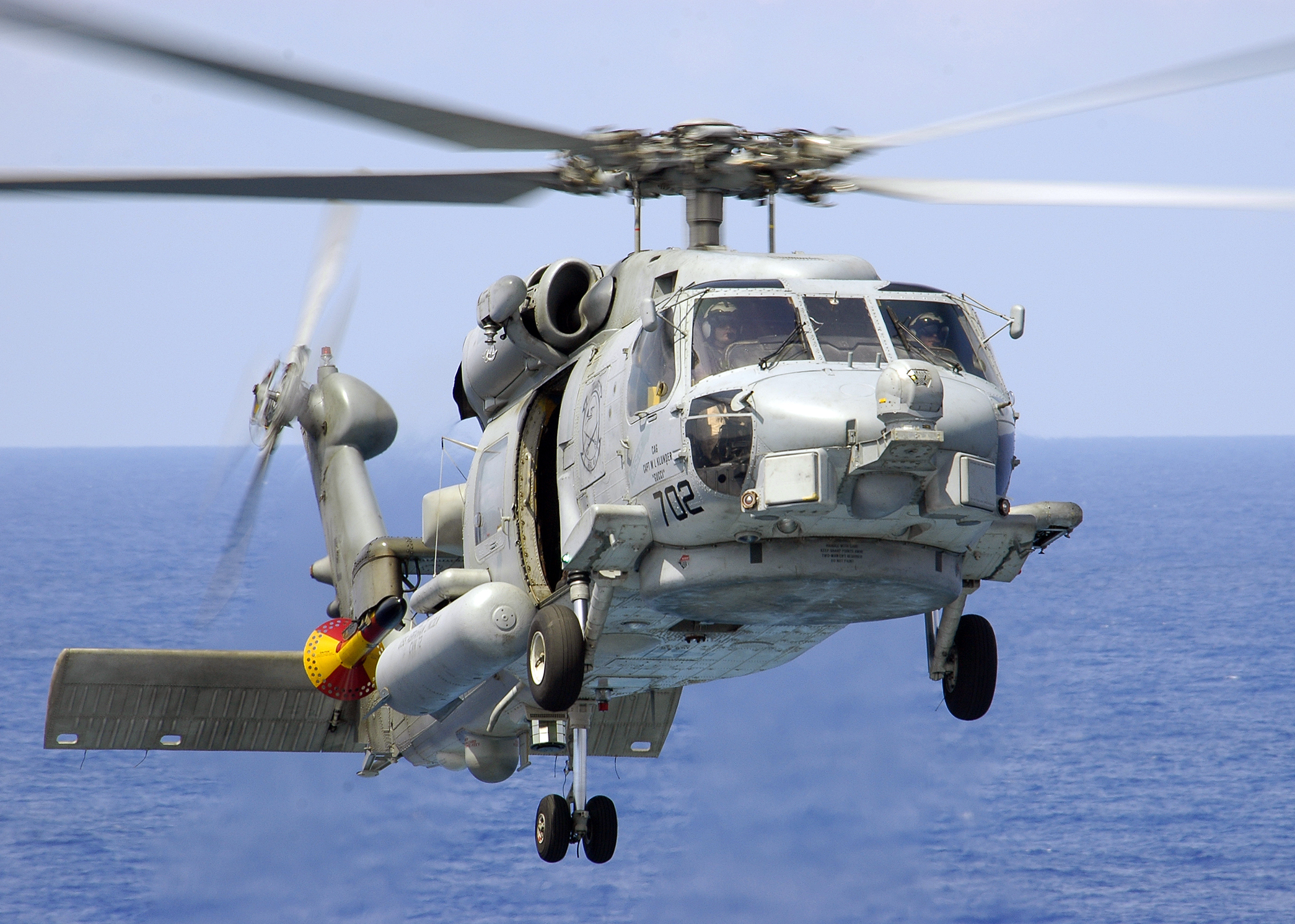
U.S. Navy SH-60B Seahawk

=== H-60 ===
- AH-60 Arpia III: Based on the UH-60H platform, is an indigenous development made by the Colombian Air Force, Israel Aircraft Industries (IAI) (Elbit Systems), and Sikorsky Aircraft. Main armament is Hellfire anti-tank missiles and a GAU-21 machine gun on an indigenously developed turret.
- AH-60 Arpia IV: Based on the UH-60L, is an indigenous development made by the Colombian Air Force, IAI (Elbit Systems), and Sikorsky. Main armament is the Spike NLOS and a Nexter THL-20 gun turret.
- UH-60 Black Hawk: The basic military utility helicopter for the U.S. Army, with MH-60A, K, L, and M Special Operations variants.
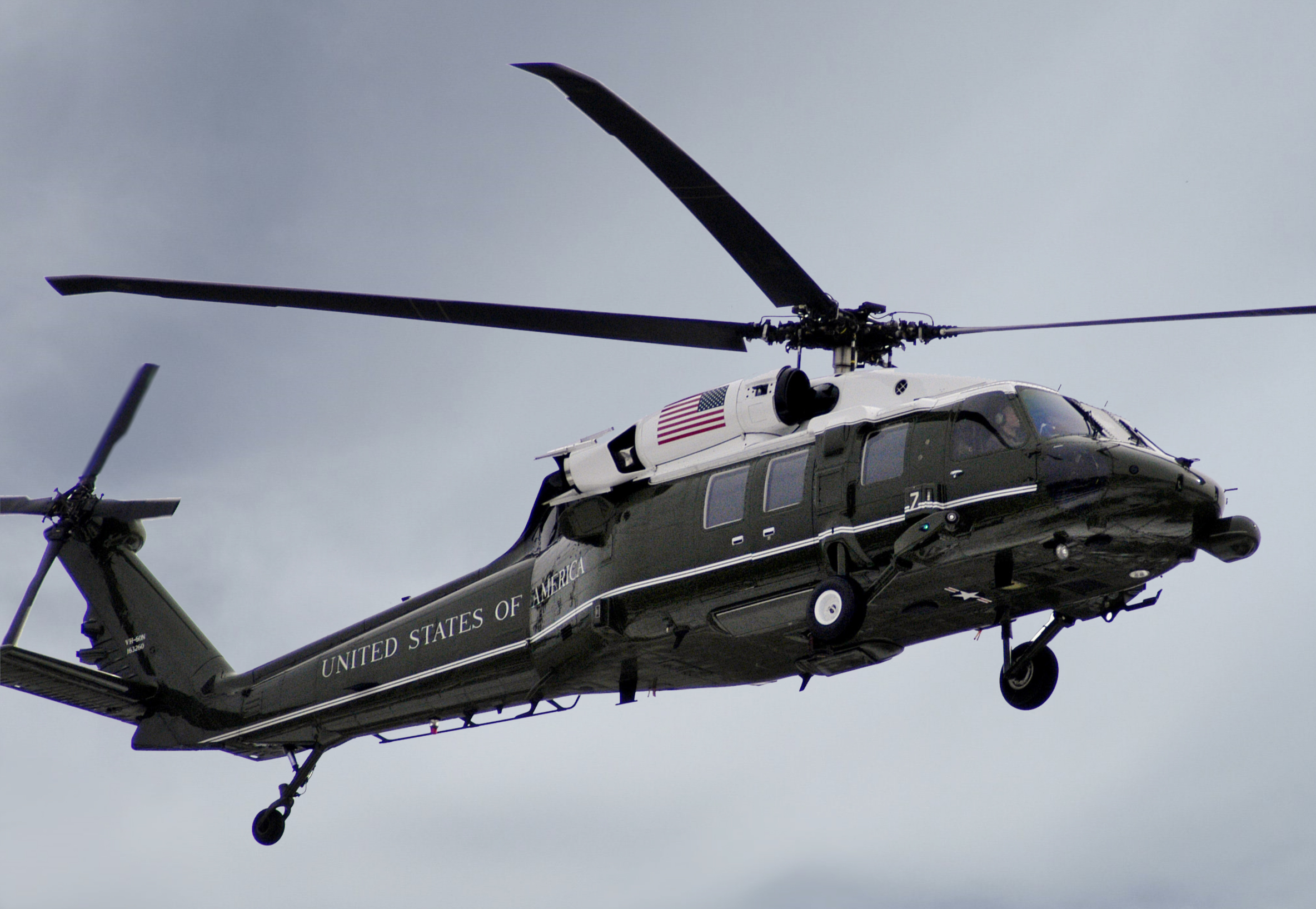
  A VH-60 flies over the Potomac
  - VH-60 White Hawk: The U.S. presidential transport helicopter, Marine One, used by the United States Marine Corps Marine Helicopter Squadron One
- SH-60 Seahawk: Variant for anti-submarine warfare, search and rescue, maritime patrol, all-weather and day/night for the U.S. Navy.
  - Sikorsky MH-60R Seahawk: A multimission maritime helicopter for the U.S. Navy
  - Sikorsky MH-60S, unofficially known as the "Knighthawk", maritime medium-heavy lift helicopter for the U.S. Navy
- HH-60 Pave Hawk: Heli-rescue variant for search and rescue, MEDEVAC, and combat search and rescue use on day and night operations for the USAF.
  - MH-60G Pave Hawk, Special Operations search-and-rescue helicopter variant for the U.S. Air Force.
- HH-60 Jayhawk: Variant for maritime patrol, interdiction, and search and rescue for the United States Coast Guard. The MH-60T Jayhawk is an upgraded version.

=== S-70 ===
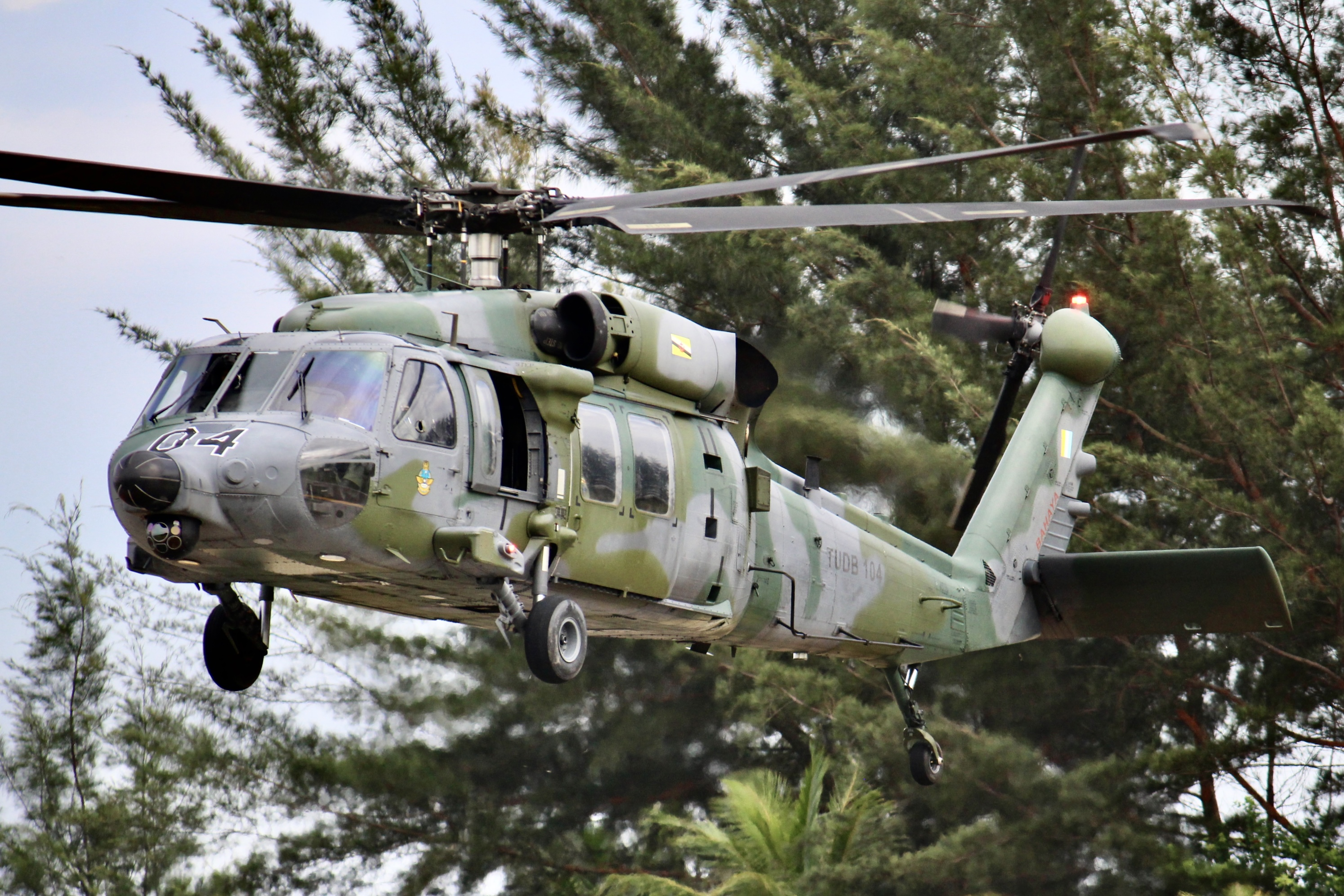
Royal Brunei Air Force S-70i in Kuala Belait, 2022

The company name for the H-60/S-70 family is the S-70 Black Hawk.

- S-70A Black Hawk (UH-60 Black Hawk): Military model for the export market.
- S-70A Firehawk: Firefighting variant of the UH-60L. Tank system designed and built by Aero Union in Chico, California.
- S-70A (N) Naval Hawk: Maritime variant that blends the S-70A Black Hawk and S-70B Seahawk designs.
- S-70B/C Seahawk: Maritime military model for the export market.
- S-70A-9: Australian derivative Black Hawk
- S-70C Firehawk: Firefighting variant
- S-70i Black Hawk: International military version assembled by Sikorsky subsidiary, PZL Mielec in Poland. Designated H.12 (Thai: ฮ.๑๒) by the Royal Thai Armed Forces.
- S-70i Firehawk: Firefighting variant assembled by Sikorsky subsidiary, PZL Mielec in Poland. Tank system designed and built by United Rotorcraft in Englewood, Colorado.
- Turkish Aerospace Industries T-70: Variant based on S-70i built under license by Turkish Aerospace Industries with indigenous Turkish mission-computer and avionics (by ASELSAN); flight controls, landing gear and transmission (by Alp Aviation); and T700-TEI-701D engines built under license from General Electric (by Tusaş Engine Industries). Turkey was to initially produce about 109 T70s under license. U.S. Ambassador to Turkey Frank Ricciardone stated that Turkey intends to produce some 600 T70s.
- S-70M Black Hawk: FAA type certified (Restricted Category Special Airworthiness Certificate) version based on S70i Black Hawk manufactured by Sikorsky subsidiary, PZL Mielec in Poland. S-70M Black Hawk helicopter is available to the US commercial/civil market for the missions such as agricultural operations, external cargo carriage and forest and wildlife conservation, which includes aerial firefighting missions.
- S-70UAS “U-Hawk” A new unmanned cargo and attack variant of the S-70

=== Derivatives ===
- Sikorsky S-71 - a proposed attack helicopter using dynamic components from the S-70.
- Sikorsky S-92 - Civilian medium-lift derivative of the S-70/H-60 with dynamic components based on S-70/H-60 components. The S-92 took its maiden flight on December 23, 1998, at the Sikorsky Development Flight Center, West Palm Beach, Florida.
- H-92 Superhawk - military version of the S-92. The Sikorsky CH-148 Cyclone is the H-92 version for the Canadian Armed Forces.
- Sikorsky VH-92 Patriot - VIP transport version of the S-92.

== Operators ==
=== Civilian operators ===
Argentina

- Presidential Air Group

Canada

- Contour Helicopters (Langley, BC), ex-US Army UH-60A now converted for firefighting operations.
- Expedition Helicopters Ltd. (Cochrane, ON), ex-US Army UH-60A now converted for firefighting operations.
- RCMP two Blackhawks leased to patrol the Canadian-US border (leased from Helicopter Transport Services (Canada) Inc.)

Colombia

- National Police of Colombia (11 UH-60Ls with 2 lost, 10 UH-60As, 19 total)
- Unidad Nacional para la Gestión del Riesgo de Desastres (UNGRD) — 2 S-70i Firehawks on order

Hong Kong

- Government Flying Service (S-70)

Indonesia

- Indonesian National Board for Disaster Management Authority - Leased from Timberline Helicopters, Inc.

Mexico

- Federal Police
- Jalisco State Police

Poland

- Police S-70i (3) (2 on order)

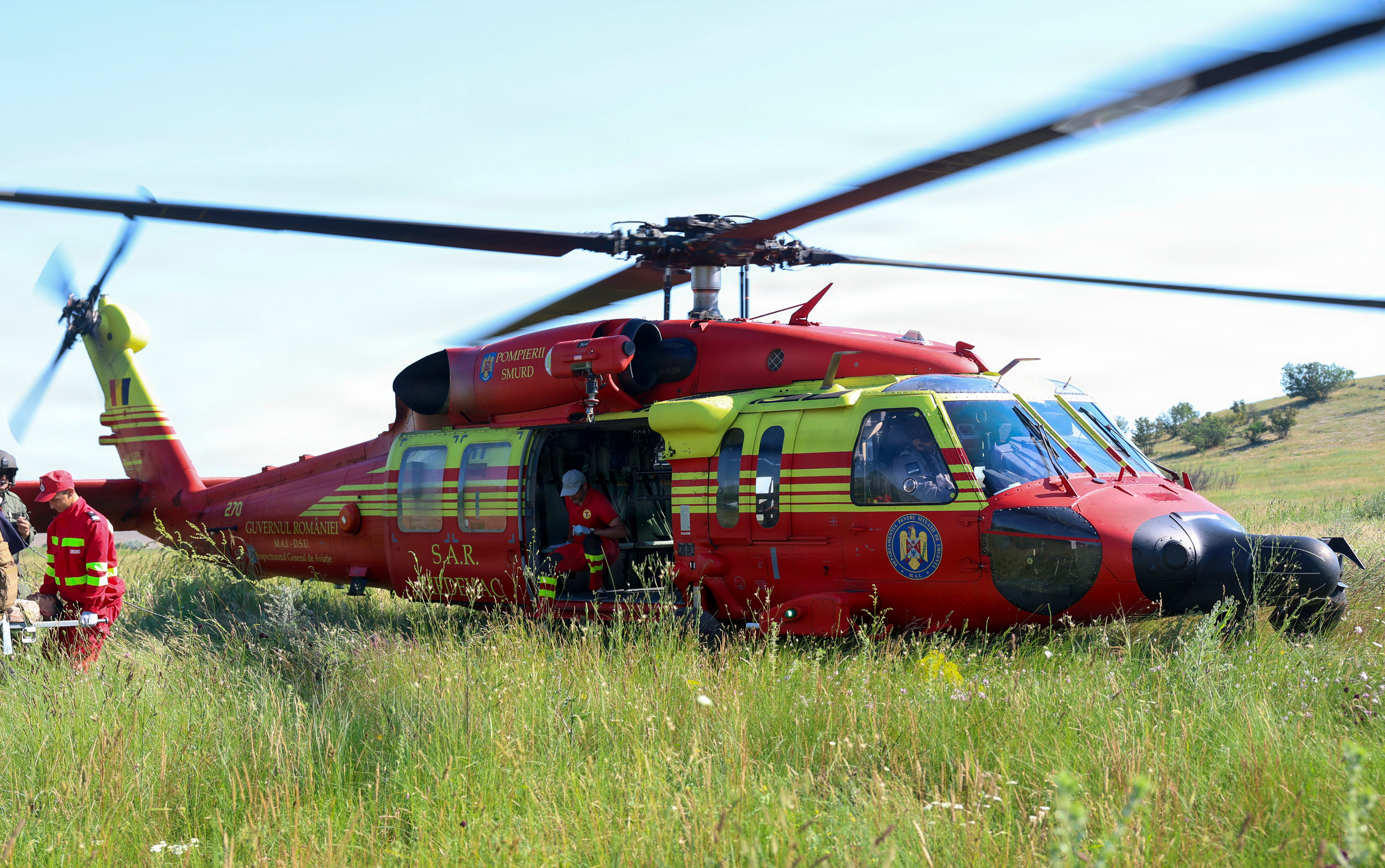
A Romanian S-70M during a medical evacuation exercise at Babadag

Romania

- Ministry of Internal Affairs - S-70M (8, with up to 12 to be purchased). Used by SMURD and the Romanian Police.

Saudi Arabia

- Ministry of Interior

Taiwan (Republic of China)

- National Airborne Service Corps

Turkey

- General Directorate of Security

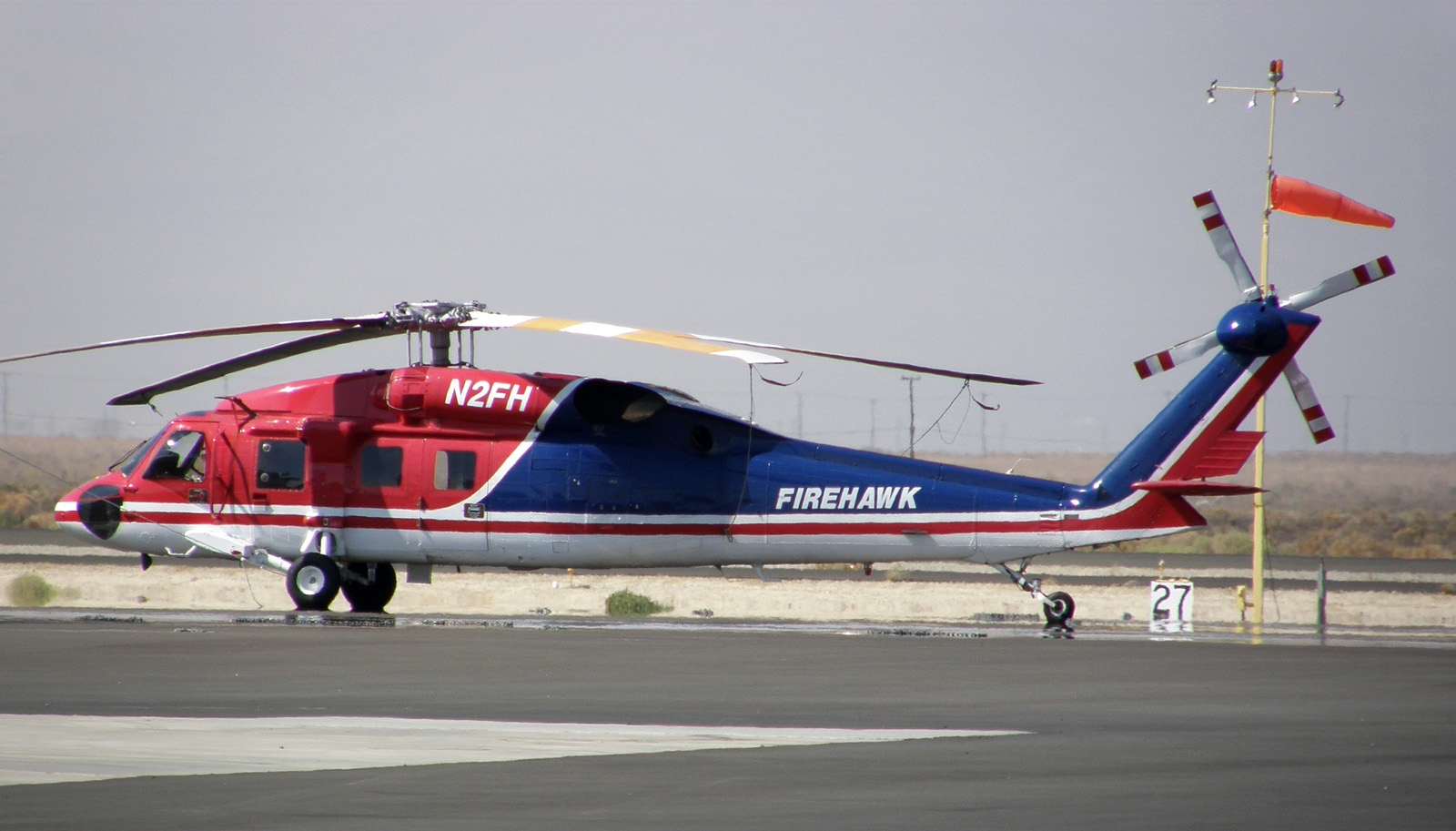
S-70C Firehawk at Fox Field, California

United States

- California Department of Forestry and Fire Protection (CAL FIRE) — 16 S-70i Firehawks ordered
- Los Angeles County Fire Department — 5 S-70A/S-70i Firehawks
- Pacific Gas and Electric Company — 2 UH-60A Blackhawks
- San Diego Fire-Rescue Department — 1 S-70i Firehawk
- U.S. Customs and Border Protection — 35 UH-60A/L/M Blackhawks ordered
- Ventura County Sheriff's Office — 3 HH-60L
- Santa Barbara County Sheriff's Office
- Colorado Department of Public Safety, Division of Fire Prevention and Control (DFPC) — 2 S-70i Firehawks

Ukraine

- Main Directorate of Intelligence - S-70i BLACK HAWK (2)

== Specifications (S-70i) ==

Data from S-70i Brochure

General characteristics

- Crew: 4 (pilot, co-pilot, & gunners or crew chiefs)
- Capacity: 11 foldable seats for troops (+12th seat quick install option) / 6 stretchers / 9,000 lb (4,082 kg) external slung load
- Length: 64 ft 10 in (19.76 m) from forward tip main rotor to rear tip tail rotor
- Width: 14 ft 4 in (4.37 m) between tips of tail wings

7 ft (2.13 m) cabin width

- Height: 17 ft 6 in (5.33 m)
- Empty weight: 11,790 lb (5,348 kg)
- Gross weight: 18,000 lb (8,165 kg)
- Max takeoff weight: 22,000 lb (9,979 kg) or 23,500 lb (10,659 kg) with external load
- Fuel capacity: 360 US gal (300 imp gal; 1,363 L) (Note: maximum fuel is 360 US gal (300 imp gal; 1,363 L) internal and two 185 US gal (154 imp gal; 700 L) cabin auxiliary tanks and up to four 450 US gal (375 imp gal; 1,703 L) or 230 US gal (192 imp gal; 871 L) drop tanks)
- Powerplant: 2 × General Electric T700-GE-701D turboshaft engines, 1,940 shp (1,450 kW) each
- Main rotor diameter: 53 ft 8 in (16.36 m)
- Main rotor area: 2,262.33 sq ft (210.177 m^{2})
- Blade section: - root: SC1095/SC1095R8; tip: Sikorsky SC1095
- Specific fuel consumption: 0.462 lb/hp/h (0.0781 kg/kW/ks)

Performance

- Maximum speed: 195 kn (224 mph, 361 km/h)
- Cruise speed: 160 kn (180 mph, 300 km/h) at maximum cruise (standard day, sea level)

149 kn (171 mph; 276 km/h) economical cruise

- Range: 250 nmi (290 mi, 460 km) with 20 minutes reserve
- Service ceiling: 20,000 ft (6,100 m) at 18,000 lb (8,165 kg) GW all engines operating (AEO)
- Rate of climb: 2,250 ft/min (11.4 m/s)

== See also ==
- U.S. helicopter armament subsystems

Related development

- Harbin Z-20
- Mitsubishi H-60
- Sikorsky CH-148 Cyclone
- Sikorsky HH-60 Pave Hawk
- Sikorsky MH-60 Jayhawk
- Sikorsky S-92
- Sikorsky SH-60 Seahawk
- Sikorsky UH-60 Black Hawk
- VH-60 Presidential Hawk

Related lists

- List of active military aircraft of the United States
- List of helicopters
- List of Sikorsky S-70 Models
- List of utility helicopters
- List of military electronics of the United States
