= CDF Aviation Management Program =

Branch of the California Department of Forestry and Fire Protection

Coordinates: 38.6665°N 121.3930°W

CAL FIRE Aviation Management Program

Operational area
- Area served: California
- Headquarters: Sacramento McClellan Airport

Agency overview
- Established: 1958
- Staffing: 18 CAL FIRE personnel; 130 contract employees

Facilities and equipment
- Stations: 14 air tanker bases; 11 helicopter bases
- Airplanes: 45
- Helicopters: 23

The CAL FIRE Aviation Management Program is a branch of the California Department of Forestry and Fire Protection (known also as CAL FIRE). Due to the frequency and severity of wildfires in California, the state has elected to establish its own aerial firefighting force rather than rely solely on contract or national resources. The Aviation Management Program is based at McClellan Airfield near Sacramento, California.

== Overview ==
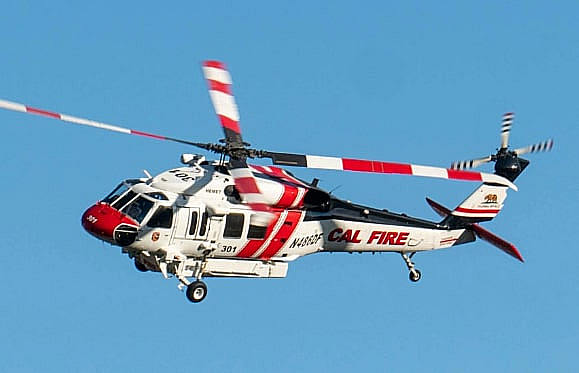
CAL FIRE S-70i Firehawk in flight

In support of its ground forces, the California Department of Forestry and Fire Protection (CAL FIRE) emergency response air program includes airtankers, helicopters and tactical aircraft. These aircraft are stationed at 14 airtanker and 11 helitack bases located statewide and can reach most fires within 20 minutes.

Tactical planes fly overhead at a fire, directing the airtankers and helicopters to critical fire areas for retardant and water drops. While both air tankers and helicopters are equipped to carry fire retardant or water, the helicopters can also transport firefighters, equipment and injured personnel.

The average annual budget of the CAL FIRE Aviation Management Program is nearly $20 million. A total of 18 CAL FIRE personnel oversee the program, with an additional 130 contract employees providing mechanical, pilot and management services.

CAL FIRE's current support contractors are DynCorp and Logistics Specialties Incorporated (LSI). DynCorp provides tanker and tactical aircraft pilot services, and all aircraft maintenance services. All CAL FIRE helicopters are flown by CAL FIRE pilots. LSI provides procurement and parts management services.

== Fleet ==
CAL FIRE aviation fleet
Aircraft	In service	Orders	Role	Gallons (Liters) Carried	Notes
Beechcraft King Air 200	3	—	Tactical	—N/a	Training aircraft
Bell UH-1H	7	—	Helicopter	360 (1,400)	Reserve fleet
Grumman S-2T	23	—	Tanker	1,200 (4,500)	
Lockheed C-130H	3	4	Tanker	4,000 (15,000)	Orders are for a total of seven aircraft to be transferred from US Coast Guard to CAL FIRE
Rockwell OV-10	16	4	Tactical	—N/a	
Sikorsky S-70i Firehawk	16	—	Helicopter	1,000 (3,800)	
Total	68	8			

== History ==
=== Air Tankers ===
The possibility of using aircraft for fighting wildland fires in California was first proposed in 1931 and again in the late 1940s after World War II. In 1953, the Nolta brothers of Willows, California proposed using their agriculture spray planes for fighting brush and grass fires. During the four fire seasons from 1954 to 1957, CAL FIRE used several small airtankers on a call-when-needed basis. These were primarily spray airplanes converted for use as firefighters. Also during this period, several enterprising aviation companies had been converting World War II Grumman TBM Avengers for air tanker use. Thus, in 1958 CAL FIRE first contracted for air tanker services with private aviation companies. That year contracts were let for three Naval Aircraft Factory N3N Canary, four Stearman and four TBM Avenger air tankers. The N3Ns and Stearmans were World War II biplanes used for pilot training and converted for use as agricultural spray planes. They were capable of carrying up to 200 gallons of fire retardant chemicals. The TBM, a World War II torpedo bomber, could deliver 600 gallons.

During the ensuing years other aircraft were converted to air tankers and used by CAL FIRE. Among these were Beechcraft 18 (Twin Beech), Boeing B-17 Flying Fortress, Consolidated PBY Catalina, and Grumman F7F Tigercat. The air tanker program continued to expand until finally in the early 1970s, a total of 14 TBMs, five F7Fs, one PBY and one B-17 comprised the CAL FIRE fleet.

By 1970, concerns with maintainability and accidents occurring in the TBM fleet led to an evaluation of the Grumman S-2 Tracker as a new generation air tanker. Although they were still active in the Navy, four were loaned to CAL FIRE for the evaluation. The Army Aviation Test Facility at Edwards Air Force Base completed a test program that showed the S-2 was a suitable replacement for the TBM. Two S-2 prototype air tankers were placed in service in 1973 with the prototype tank being built at the CAL FIRE Mobile Equipment Facility in Davis and the S-2 modification being completed by Hemet Valley Flying Service. These conversions were accomplished using plans developed by Ontario Lands and Forests in Ontario, Canada.

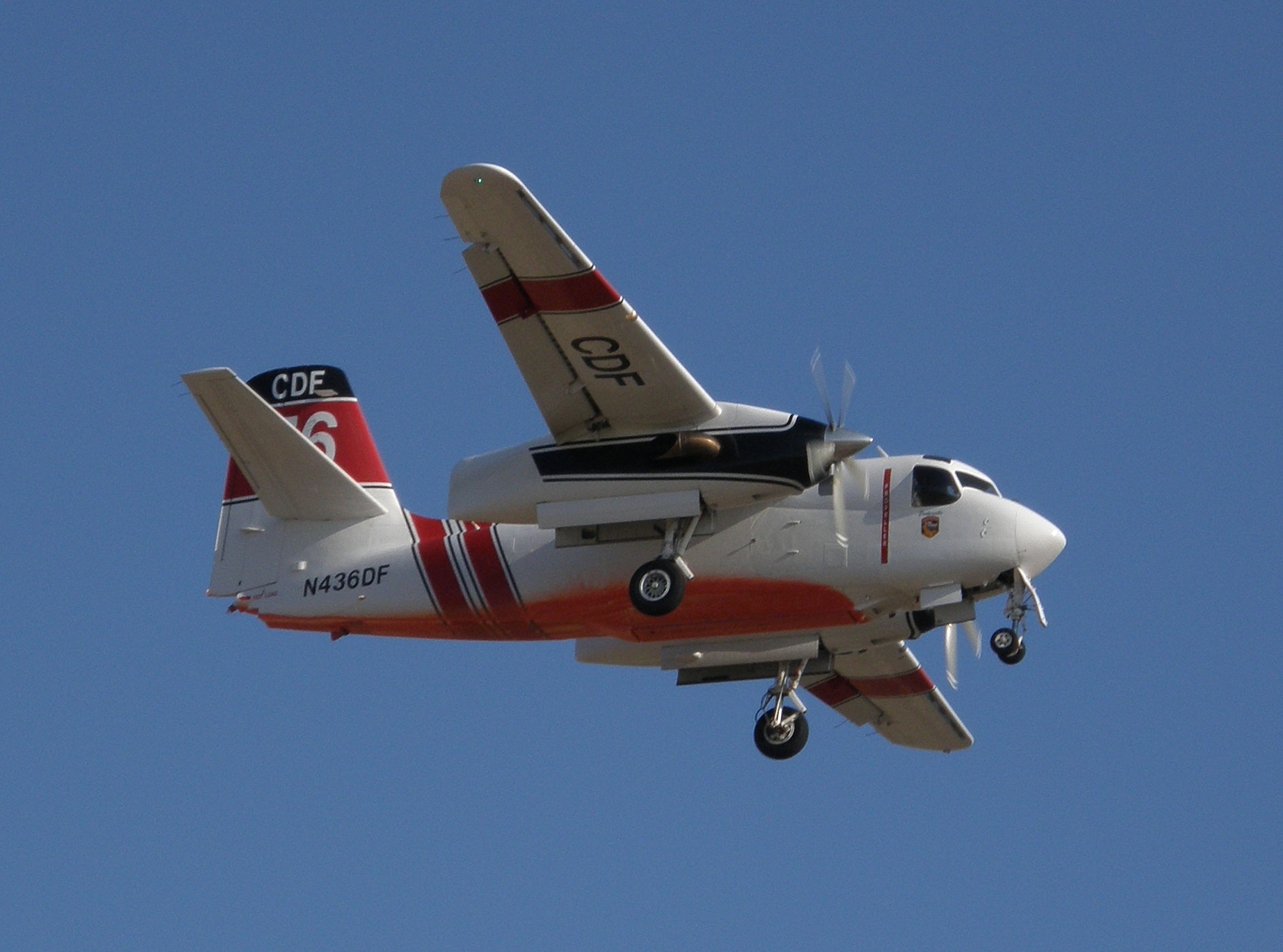
Grumman S-2T landing at Fox Field, while fighting the North Fire

Three TBM accidents in 1973 and three F7F accidents in 1974 accelerated the CAL FIRE S-2 modification program. As a result, contracts were entered into with four California contractors, Aero Union Corp., Sis-Q Flying Service, TBM Inc. and Hemet Valley Flying Service to modify and tank ten S-2 air tankers during the 1973/1974 winter period. As a result, 12 S-2As were placed in service in 1974 and five more were built by Bay Aviation Services and put into the fleet for the 1975 fire season.

Three separate leases with the U.S. Navy brought a total of 55 S-2s and 60 engines for the program. This allowed CAL FIRE to keep the fleet going until the mid-1990s when it was decided to upgrade from S-2A to S-2T air tankers. In 1987, CAL FIRE entered into an agreement with Marsh Aviation of Mesa, Arizona to build a prototype S-2T. This prototype was placed in service and used at several bases. The success of the prototype led to acquisition of 26 S-2E/G aircraft in 1996. The E/G series S-2 was larger and newer. It could haul 1200 gallons of retardant with two TPE-331 GR turboprop engines at speeds in excess of 200 kn (370.4 km/h). A contract for building 23 of the new S-2T airtankers was entered into, with 13 delivered by the end of 2002, seven additional aircraft delivered and placed in service by the end of 2004 and the final three in 2005. As the new air tankers were delivered and placed in service, the original S-2As were retired.

In 2007, CAL FIRE contracted with 10 Tanker Air Carrier for a three year exclusive use contract utilizing a wide body McDonnell Douglas DC-10-10 aerial firefighting jet air tanker known as Tanker 910, at a cost of $5 million per year.

In July 2018, CAL FIRE began efforts to receive seven Lockheed C-130H aircraft from US Coast Guard. The transfer was made official by the December 2023 passage of the FY24 National Defense Authorization Act. The aircraft started entering active service in August 2024 after conversion into airtankers.

=== Air Tactical Aircraft ===
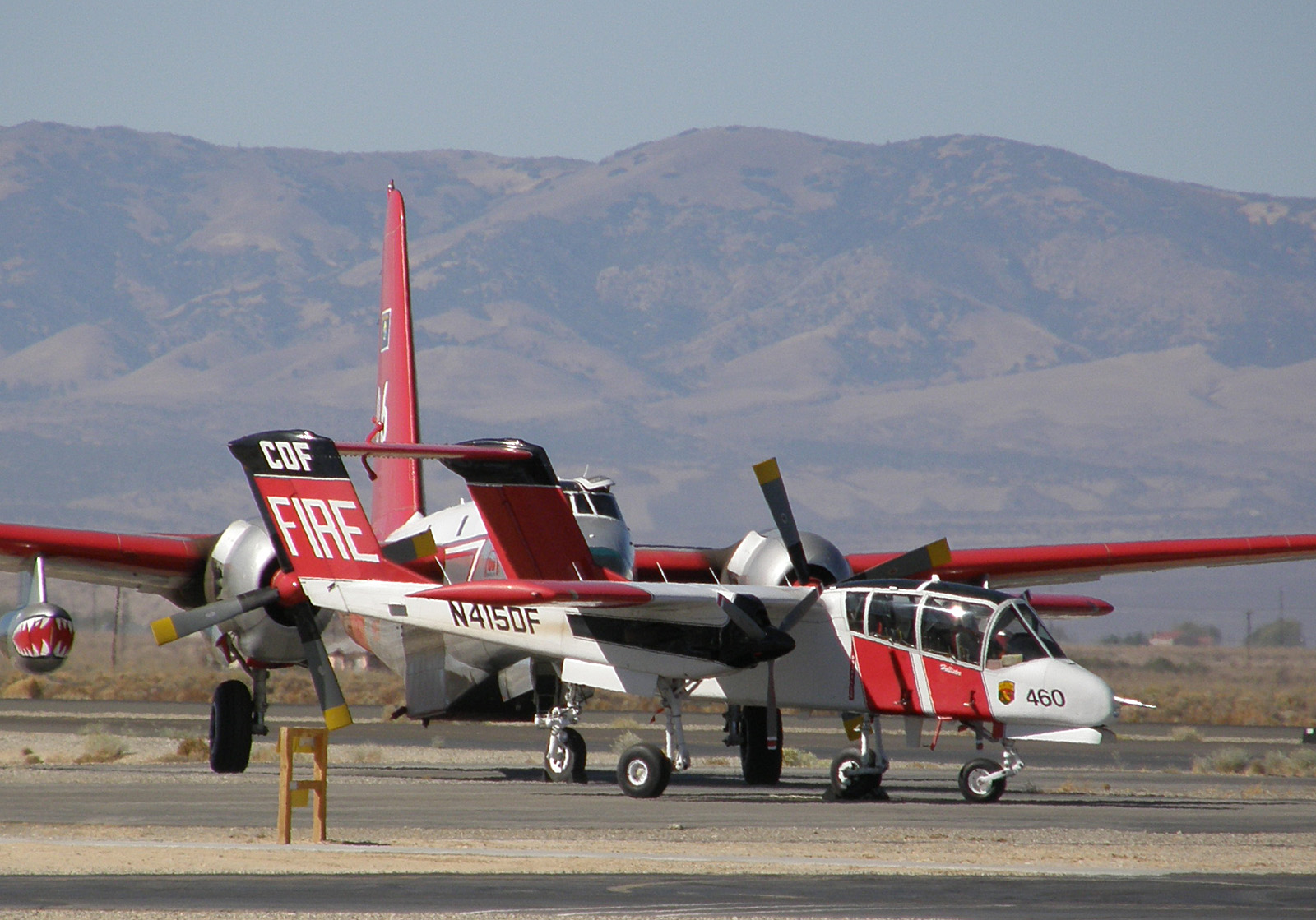
Air Attack 460, a Rockwell OV-10, at Fox Field during the 2007 Southern California firestorm

In the mid-1970s, CAL FIRE found that the contractor-owned air tactical planes, mostly single-engine Cessna 182s and Cessna 210s, did not provide the airspeed and safety needed for the new air tanker program. In 1974, CAL FIRE acquired 20 retired USAF Cessna O-2 observation aircraft from Davis-Monthan Air Force Base. These O-2s had been forward air control aircraft in Vietnam, had been shipped back to the United States in containers and were disassembled and on pallets when they arrived at CAL FIRE's Fresno maintenance facility. A crew of California Conservation Corp (CCC) members reassembled the aircraft. They were placed in service in 1976. The O-2 program was a success and served the Department for more than 20 years.

In 1993, CAL FIRE obtained 15 twin-engine turbine-powered North American OV-10A aircraft from the U.S. Navy. The OV-10s replaced the O-2s as the CAL FIRE's next-generation air tactical platform.

=== Helicopter Program ===
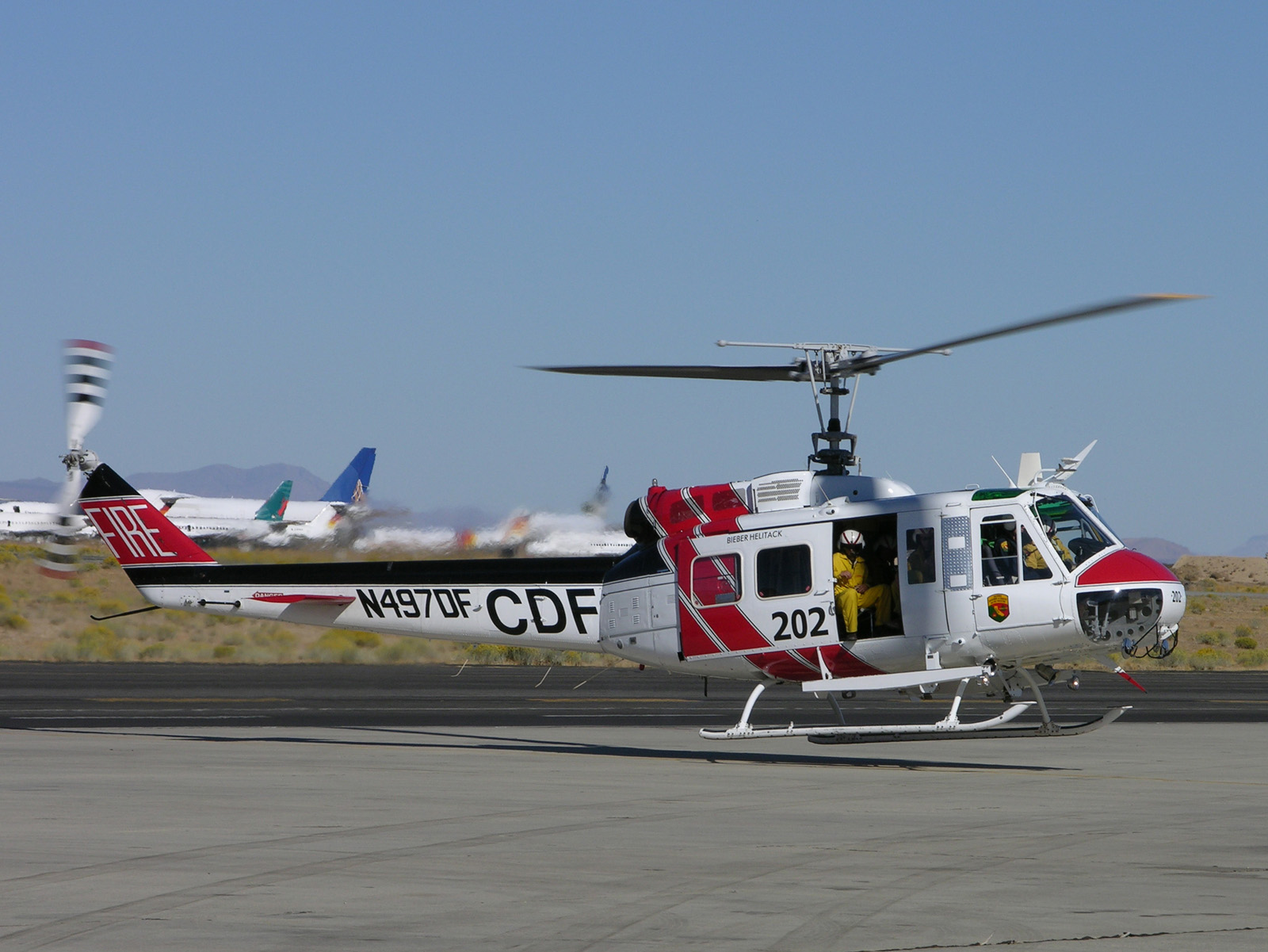
CAL FIRE Super Huey, formerly an EH-1H, assigned to the Bieber Helitack crew, takes off from the Mojave Airport

In 1960 the Division of Forestry decided to experiment with a small, skilled initial attack, or "helitack" crew to be transported by helicopter to increase the early arrival of manpower and equipment to an initial attack fire. Although the crews were trained for hover jumping and had purchased heli-jump suits from the US Forest Service, it was never found necessary to make a jump. Six helitack bases were established in the early 1970s. They were staffed with contracted Bell JetRangers. A typical CAL FIRE helitack crew which responded with the helicopter consisted of one fire captain and two to three seasonal firefighters.

CAL FIRE began using contractor-owned helicopters for fire control in the mid-1960s. Bell 47, Hiller FH1100, Bell 206 JetRangers and Aerospatiale Alouettes were used the most through the 1970s. The helicopters were located at CAL FIRE facilities which protected high value timberlands and critical watershed areas generally in Northern and Central California with one located at Ryan Field in Southern California. The helicopter began playing an increasing role in the CAL FIRE's Initial Attack strategy during the late 70s. In 1978 three Bell 205 medium helicopters were hired in addition to the standby helicopters. One helicopter was located at the Howard Forest, Mendocino Ranger Unit Headquarters. The other two were located at Hemet/Ryan Field and the Monte Vista, San Diego Ranger Unit Headquarters. Each of the medium helicopters was assigned 11 person helitack crews. Unfortunately, in the mid to late 1970s CAL FIRE experienced an increased accident rate throughout the helicopter program. Five accidents involving contractor-owned Bell Jet Rangers occurred in 1979.

As a result of the accidents, CAL FIRE decided that better approach would be for the agency to own and operate its own helicopters. In 1981, CAL FIRE leased 12 excess UH-1F Hueys which had previously been used by the USAF in Vietnam. Nine helicopters were initially reconditioned, and were operated as non-certificated, public-use aircraft. The first helicopter was built up November, 1981 and was placed in service at Hemet-Ryan Helitack Base. Six more F Model Hueys were built up and placed in service at helitack bases throughout California in the summer of 1982. During the first two years CAL FIRE employed “Personal Service Contract” pilots. Each base was assigned a full-time pilot and a seasonal relief pilot who covered two bases. The majority of the contract pilots became state employees in 1984. The helitack unit was designed to be a cohesive unit which consisted of the helicopter and helitack crew. A typical configuration for the helicopter was a Helitack Fire Captain in the copilot's seat and a Helitack Fire Captain plus six fire-fighters in the passenger compartment. The water bucket was replaced in 1984 with a newly designed Canadian 324-US-gallon (1,230 L) Bambi bucket. In the mid-1980s, fixed water dropping tanks were installed on several helicopters. Water bucket operations over ever-increasing populated regions in the urban interface areas of eastern Riverside County had been causing a concern. An accidental drop of a water bucket could cause catastrophic results, while a fixed tank reduced the exposure. In addition, some areas where the helicopters operated had few water sources from which a helicopter could fill its bucket. A fixed tank allowed the helicopter to obtain water from sources previously unobtainable with the bucket.

As the 1991 lease agreement expiration date with the US Air Force rapidly approached, CAL FIRE started a search for a replacement that ultimately resulted in the acquisition in 1989 of the UH-1H. The airframes that CAL FIRE obtained were part of 100 that had been released by the US Department of Defense to the US Forest Service for distribution to states as Federal Excess Personal Property (FEPP) for wildland fire fighting.

The UH-1H aircraft were significantly modified to meet CAL FIRE's specialized needs. The modified helicopters were designated as Super Hueys. The Super Huey included a larger, more powerful engine, transmission and rotor system. The tail boom and tail rotor were also modified to accommodate the engine, giving the aircraft greater performance than the standard US Army UH-1H helicopters in hotter and higher conditions typical of California.

A video montage of the Sikorsky S-70i purchased by CDF in 2020.

Both the F model and the Super Huey maintenance programs were developed by CAL FIRE using the most restrictive overhaul/replacement criteria of the military or Bell Helicopter. All maintenance is performed by contract mechanics. Big Valley built up and maintained the F model helicopters from 1981 to 1990 at their Stockton facility. They also started building up the first Super Hueys in 1989. San Joaquin Helicopters completed the Super Huey build-ups and maintained them in their facility in Yolo County and later at the Aviation Management facility at Mather Field in Sacramento from 1989 to 1999. DynCorp was awarded the contract in 2000 and continued to maintain the Super Hueys at Mather and later at McClellan Airfield in North Highlands, California.

In 2019, CAL FIRE began replacing the Super Hueys with new Sikorsky S-70i Firehawk helicopters. The Firehawk airframe was built by PZL Mielec in Poland and outfitted for firefighting by United Rotorcraft in Englewood, Colorado. The original order for 12 Firehawks replaced the Super Hueys on a one-to-one basis, but in 2022, additional funding was approved to purchase four additional Firehawks increase surge capacity and to maintain operational capabilities during mandatory maintenance cycles. The Super Hueys are expected to be retained on reserve status.

The Firehawk has twin turbine engines, providing redundancy and enabling the airship to carry heavier payloads, including up to 1,000 U.S. gallons (3,800 L; 830 imp gal) of water or fire retardant, a significant increase over the 360 U.S. gal (1,400 L; 300 imp gal) capacity of the Super Huey. Additionally, the Firehawk's advanced avionics offer night-flying capabilities that were previously unavailable. Crews also report that while the Firehawk is physically larger, it has more maneuverability, allowing it to access more and smaller landing zones than the Super Huey.

== Bases ==
CAL FIRE aviation bases
Base	Airfield	Type
Alma	Alma Helitack Base	Helitack
Bieber	Bieber Helitack Base	Helitack
Boggs Mountain	Boggs Mountain Helitack Base	Helitack
Chico	Chico Regional Airport	Air Attack
Columbia	Columbia Airport	Air Attack, Helitack
Fresno	Fresno Air Attack Base	Air Attack, jointly operated with USFS
Gillespie Field	Gillespie Field	Helitack, jointly operated with San Diego Sheriff
Grass Valley	Nevada County Air Park	Air Attack, jointly operated with USFS
Hemet Ryan	Hemet-Ryan Airport	Air Attack, Helitack
Hollister	Hollister Municipal Airport	Air Attack, Helitack
Howard Forest	Howard Forest Helitack Base	Helitack
Kneeland	Kneeland Airport	Helitack
McClelland	Sacramento McClellan Airport	Headquarters / Air Attack
Paso Robles	Paso Robles Municipal Airport	Air Attack
Porterville	Porterville Municipal Airport	Air Attack, jointly operated with USFS
Prado	Prado Helitack Base	Helitack
Ramona	Ramona Airport	Air Attack
Redding	Redding Regional Airport	Air Attack, jointly operated with USFS
Rohnerville	Rohnerville Airport	Air Attack
Sonoma	Charles M. Schulz–Sonoma County Airport	Air Attack
Ukiah	Ukiah Municipal Airport	Air Attack
Vina	Vina Helitack Base	Helitack

== Accidents ==
The program has experienced 13 fatal accidents, all aircraft involved were Grumman S-2T airtankers.

Date	Reg.	Pilot(s)	Cause
June 29, 1976	N414DF	William W. Sears	Possible pilot incapacitation/heart attack.
August 20, 1978	N448DF	James M. Lippitt	Suspected stall on final approach for drop.
June 13, 1979	N404DF	Gayle E. Eaton	Stall/spin during base-to-final turn (following lead plane) for drop.
July 27, 1982	N416DF	James P. Eakin	Aircraft struck tree on final approach to fire, losing some flight controls before crashing.
July 13, 1984	N451DF	Ted Bell Jr.	En route to fire, flew up a canyon he could not clear. Energy management.
September 28, 1984	N436DF	Ed Real	Stalled turning into raising terrain after drop. Energy management.
June 29, 1986	N415DF	Richard Boyd, Clarence R. Lind	Training flight; stalled after water drop. Suspect simulated engine failure practice being given.
October 7, 1987	N444DF	Don Johnson	Stalled making a climbing turn after drop.
June 19, 1992	N427DF	Roger Stark	After drop, struck tree, severing about 11.5 feet (3.5 m) off the left wing.
October 5, 1998	N416DF	Gary Nagel	Left wing tip impacted ground during tight turn to final on high wind, quartering tailwind drop.
August 27, 2001	N450DF	Larry Groff	Midair collision over bus accident.
August 27, 2001	N442DF	Lars Stratte	Midair collision over bus accident.
October 7, 2014	N449DF	Geoffrey "Craig" Hunt	Left wing severed after striking tree, followed by descending left roll until impacting the top of 800-foot tall rock cliff.
