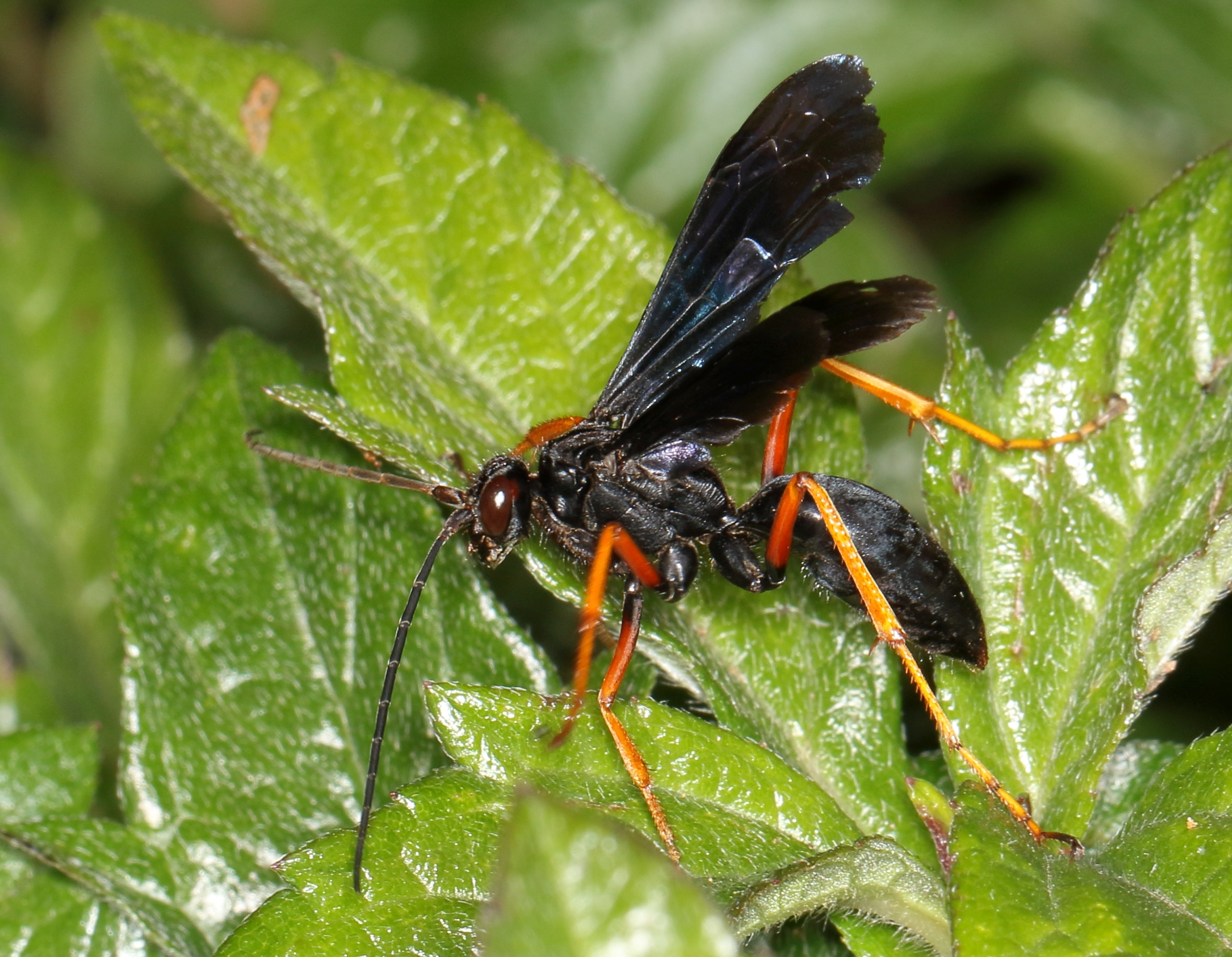
- Cyphononyx optimus from South Africa

Scientific classification
- Kingdom: Animalia
- Phylum: Arthropoda
- Clade: Pancrustacea
- Class: Insecta
- Order: Hymenoptera
- Family: Pompilidae
- Genus: Cyphononyx
- Species: C. optimus

Binomial name
- Cyphononyx optimus (Smith, 1855)

Synonyms
- Cyphononyx abyssinica Gribodo, 1879; Cyphononyx lynx Lucas, 1897; Pompilus momboensis Cameron; Pompilus optimus Smith, 1855; Priocnemis lynx Lucas; Priocnemis optimis Smith; Salius lynx Lucas; Salius melanoceras Cameron, 1910; Salius momboensis Cameron, 1910; Salius optimus (Smith) ù; Salius schoenlandi Cameron, 1905; Salius spilostomus Cameron, 1905

= Cyphononyx optimus =

Species of wasp

Cyphononyx optimus is a species of spider wasps in the family Pompilidae.

== Description ==
C. optimus can reach a total length of about 50 mm (2.0 in). The body length of females (head to tip of abdomen) is 19-26 mm, and of males, 14-18 mm. has black antennae, thorax and abdomen. The head is mostly black. (The labrum and parts of the mandibles and clypeus are dark red, as are thin lines adjacent to the eyes.) The legs, are ferruginous (yellowish to red) excepting the coxae, trochanters and base of the femora, which are black. The wings are also black, but with bluish reflections.

Females of this genus hunt and paralyse large spiders, mainly Palystes species.

== Distribution and habitat ==
This species can be found in subtropical forests, savanna, and bushveld of Ethiopia, Kenya, Uganda, South Africa, and Zimbabwe. It is fairly common in areas with abundant rainfall (average annual rainfall of over 750 mm).

== Gallery ==
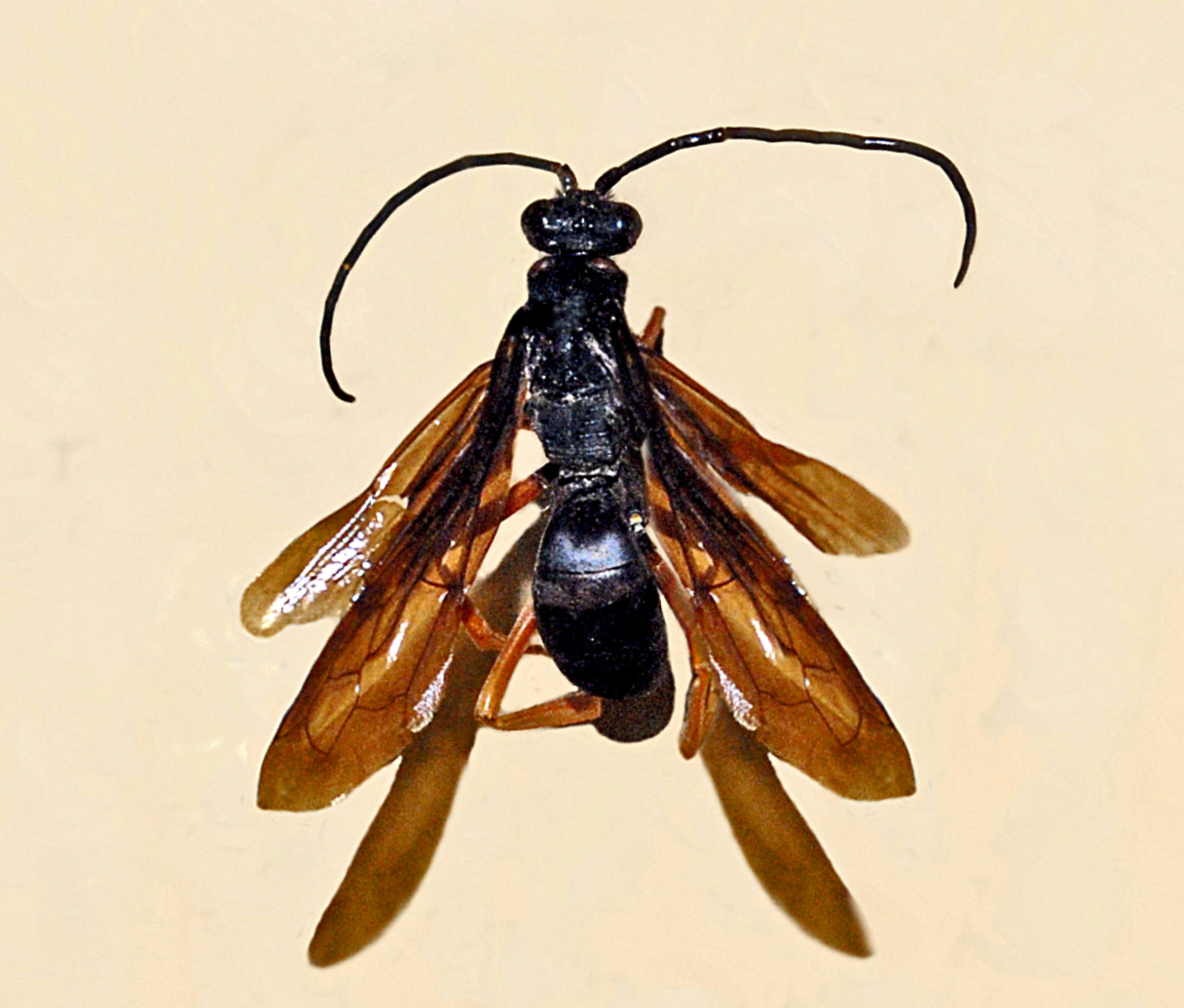
Cyphononyx optimus from Ethiopia

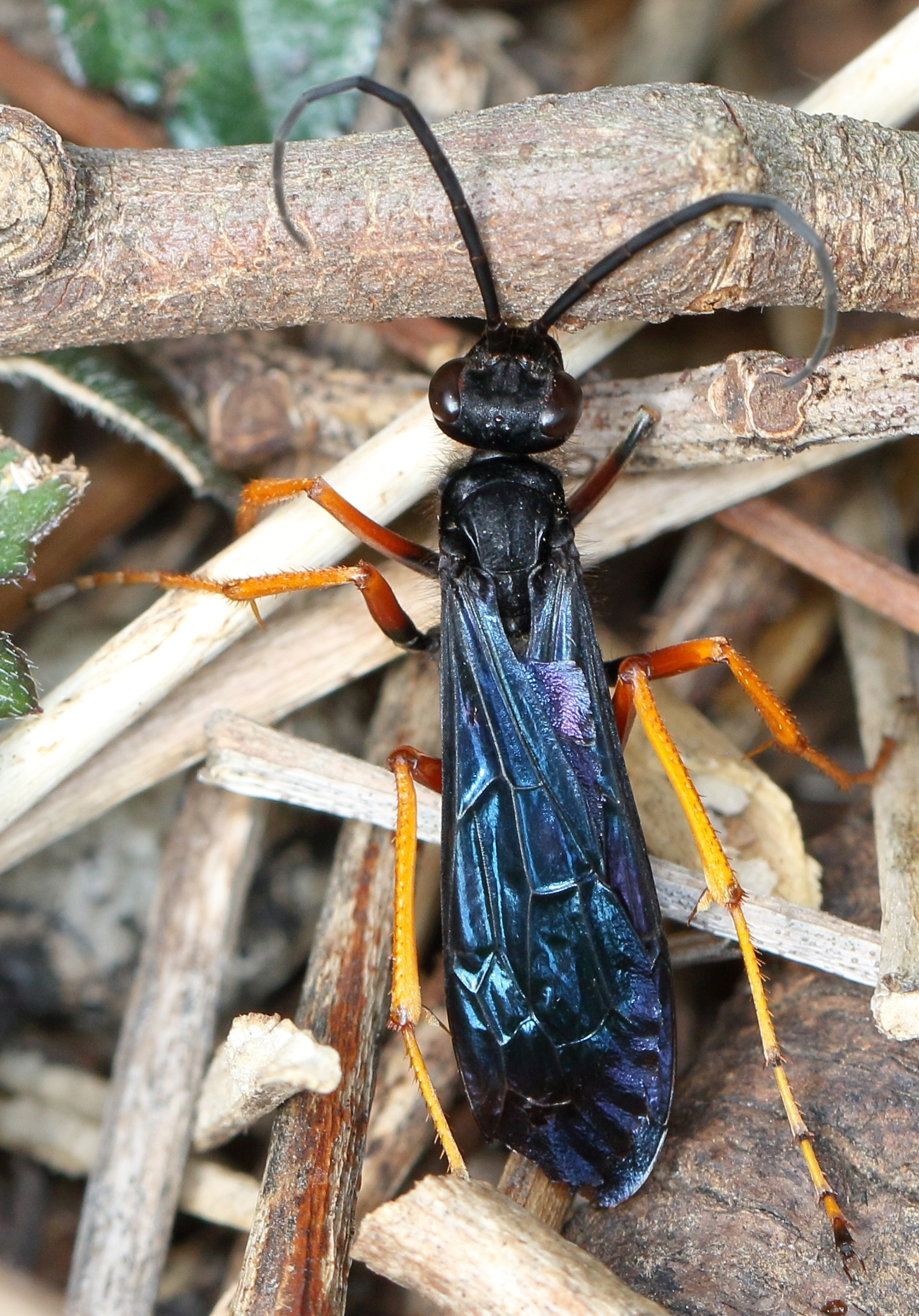

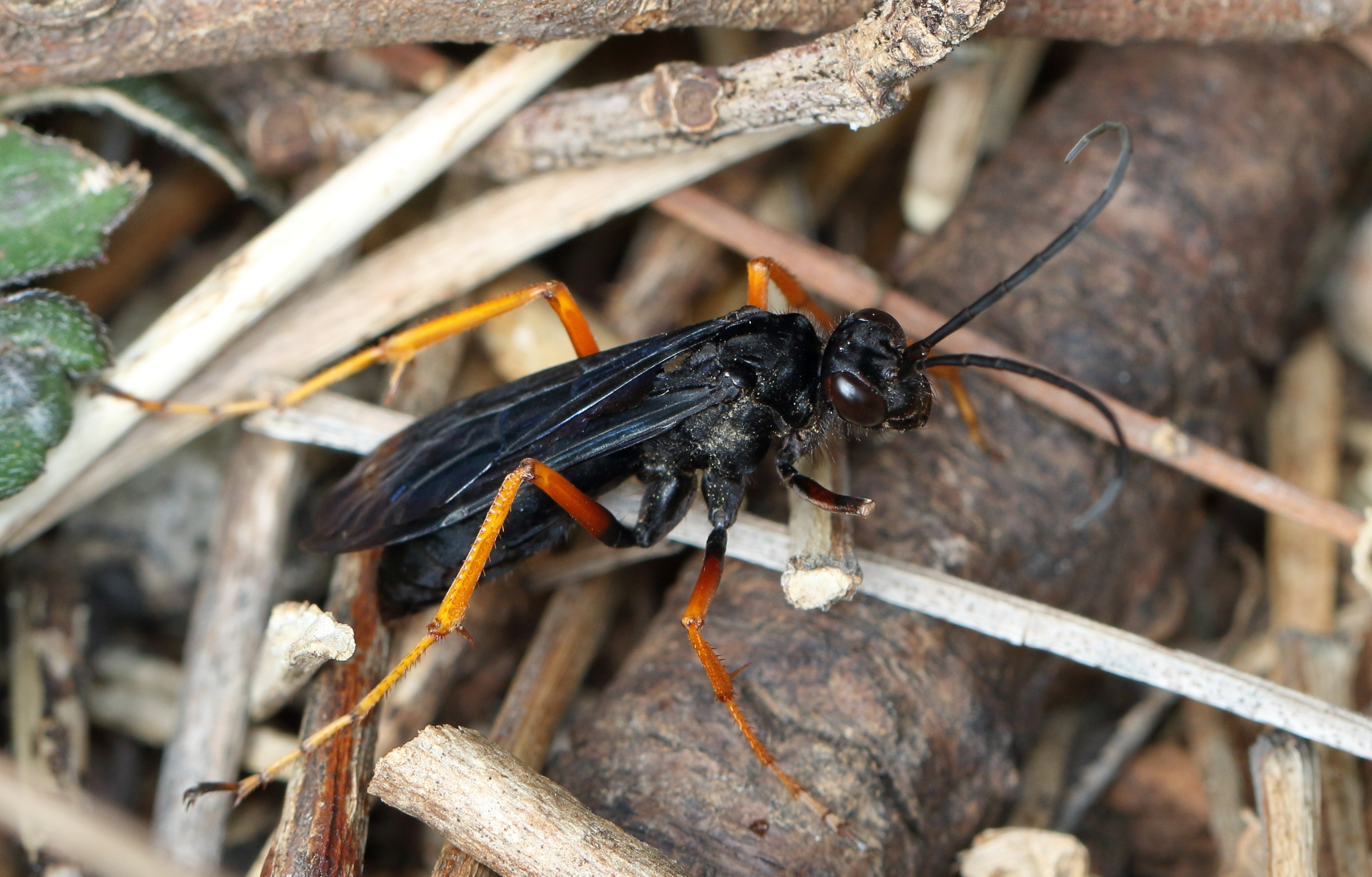

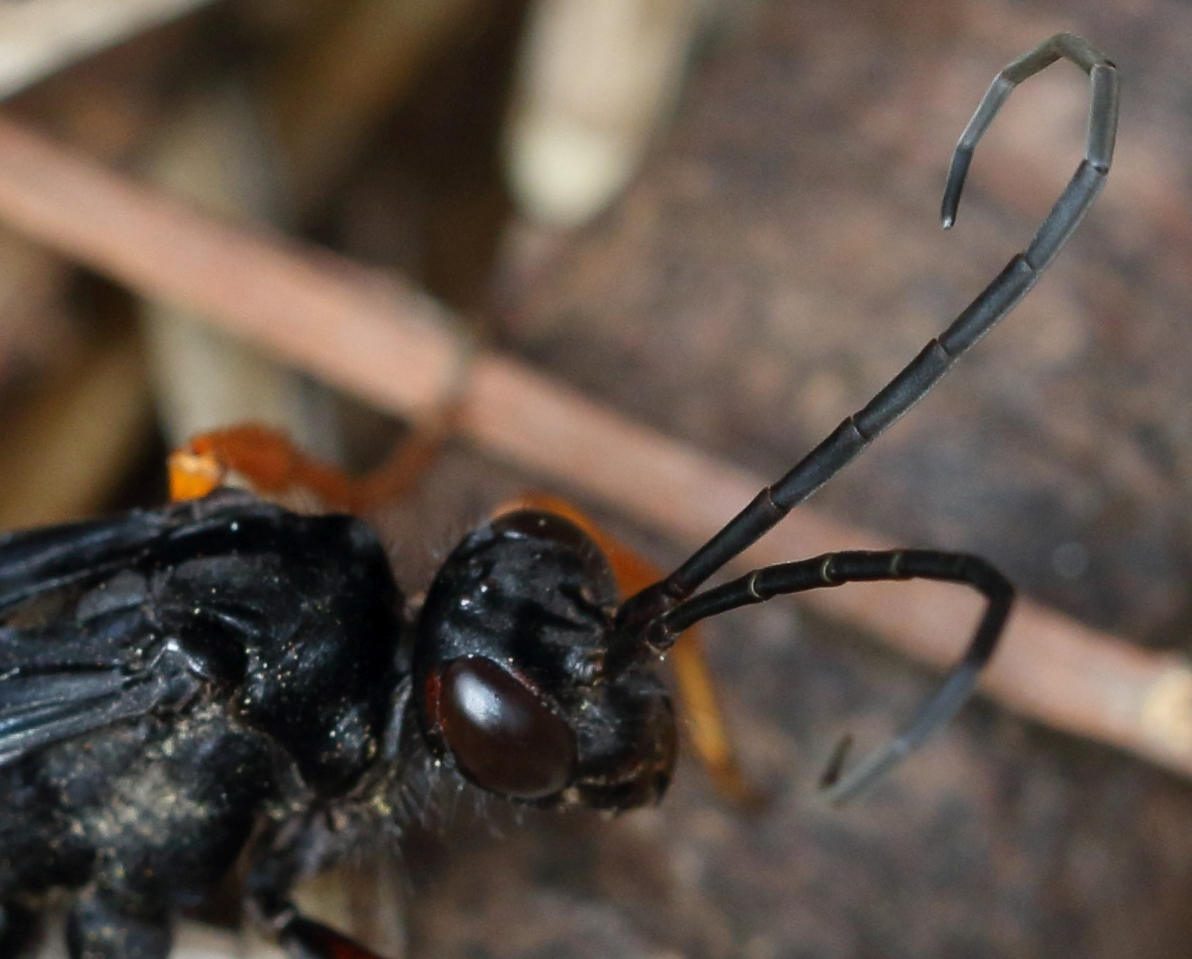
