= Howard Forest Station =

CAL Fire station in Mendocino County, California (USA)

Coordinates: 39.34587°N 123.31900°W

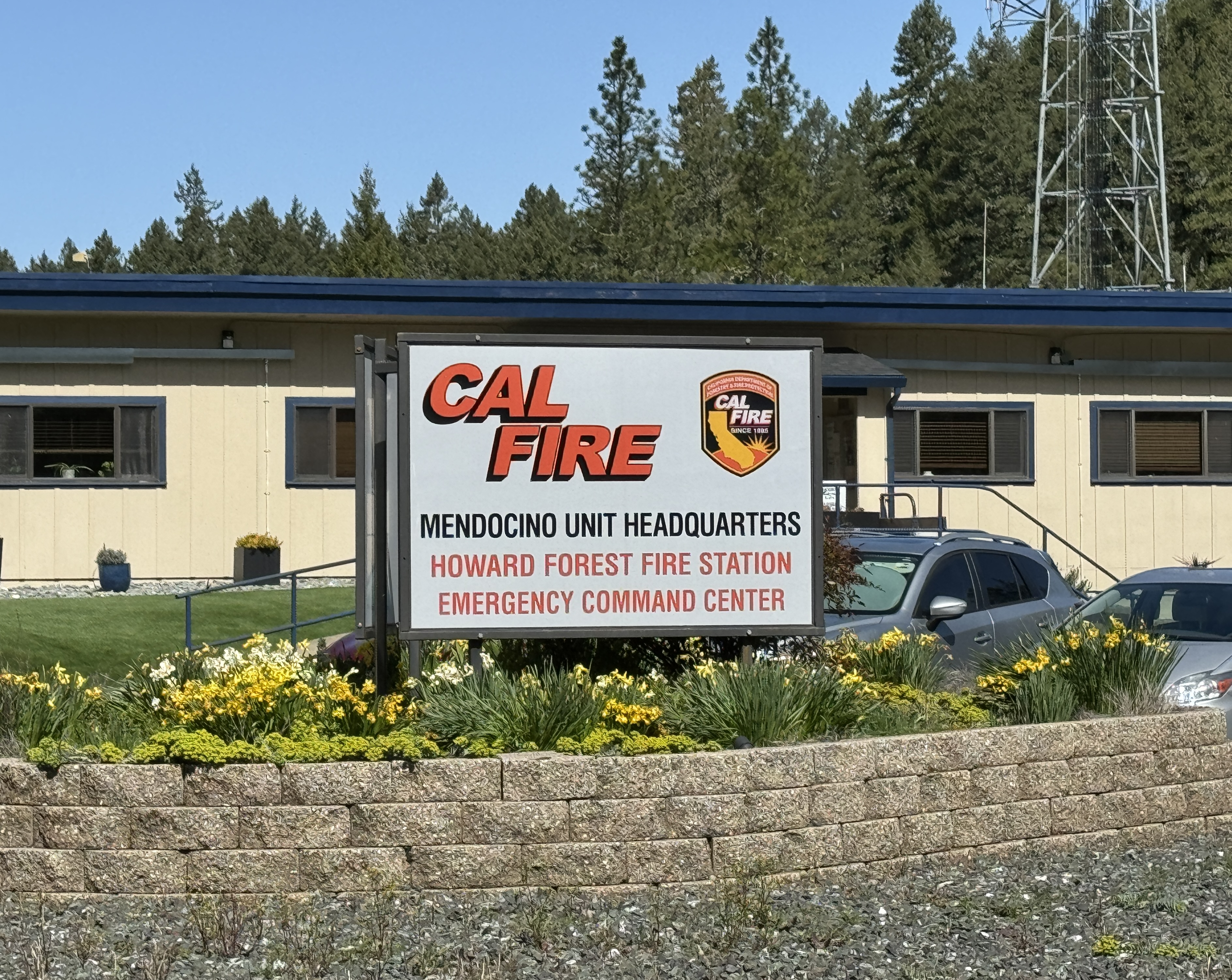
Howard Forest Station on March 8, 2024.

Howard Forest Station is a CAL Fire station and emergency command center (ECC) in Mendocino County, California, located along U.S. Route 101 and 5 miles (8 km) south of the city of Willits. The Howard Forest ECC serves as a secondary public safety answering point (PSAP) for fire and emergency medical services in largely unincorporated Mendocino County. The compound is also the location of the Howard Forest Helitack Base and serves as the headquarters of the Mendocino Ranger Unit.

== Fire station ==
Howard Forest covers a 50-mile (80 km) initial attack response area that contains over 2,800,000 acres (11,000 km^{2}) of state land, and over 730,000 acres (3,000 km^{2}) of US Forest Service and Bureau of Land Management lands. Two fire engines respond from Howard Forest station during peak fire season, each staffed with a crew of three (one officer, two firefighters.) Assigned to the facility are three fire captains, three fire apparatus engineers and ten seasonal firefighters.

== Helitack base ==
The Howard Forest Helitack Base crew includes two pilots, four fire captains, two Fire Apparatus Engineers and twelve seasonal firefighters. This crew staffs a UH-1 H helicopter with call sign Copter 101. The helitack crew logs an average of 412 flight hours per year and responds to both fires and medical emergencies.

When CAL Fire began to develop a helitack program in 1970, it was decided that helitack bases would be established in areas where they could most easily protect high-value timberlands and critical watershed areas in northern and central California. Subsequently two bases were created for Mendocino County and the surrounding area to protect the high-value timber industry in this region. Starting in 1972, the first was located at Laytonville Fire Station, with call sign Copter 101. The second was an Evergreen contract Bell 205A1 (50 Romeo) starting in 1977 at CDF's Howard Forest Fire Station near the town of Willits, California, with call sign of Copter 100. Copter 100 performed the first rope rappelling at Howard Forest, and demonstrated the value and function of the Medium Helicopter for California firefighting. In 1981, Laytonville helitack moved and Copter 101 established at its current location at Howard Forest; Copter 100 and its helitack crew was disbanded. Laytonville's helipad and fueling facilities are still maintained as a secondary base and mid-mission refueling location.

== Emergency command center ==
In addition to all CAL Fire units within the county, Howard Forest is also responsible for dispatching multiple local entities including 19 Local Government Fire Agencies, 7 Ambulance Agencies, REHIT Hazardous Materials Team, and BLM Law Enforcement in Lake and Mendocino Counties.

== See also ==
- CDF Aviation Management Program
- Helicopter bucket
- Aerial firefighting
- Wildfire suppression
