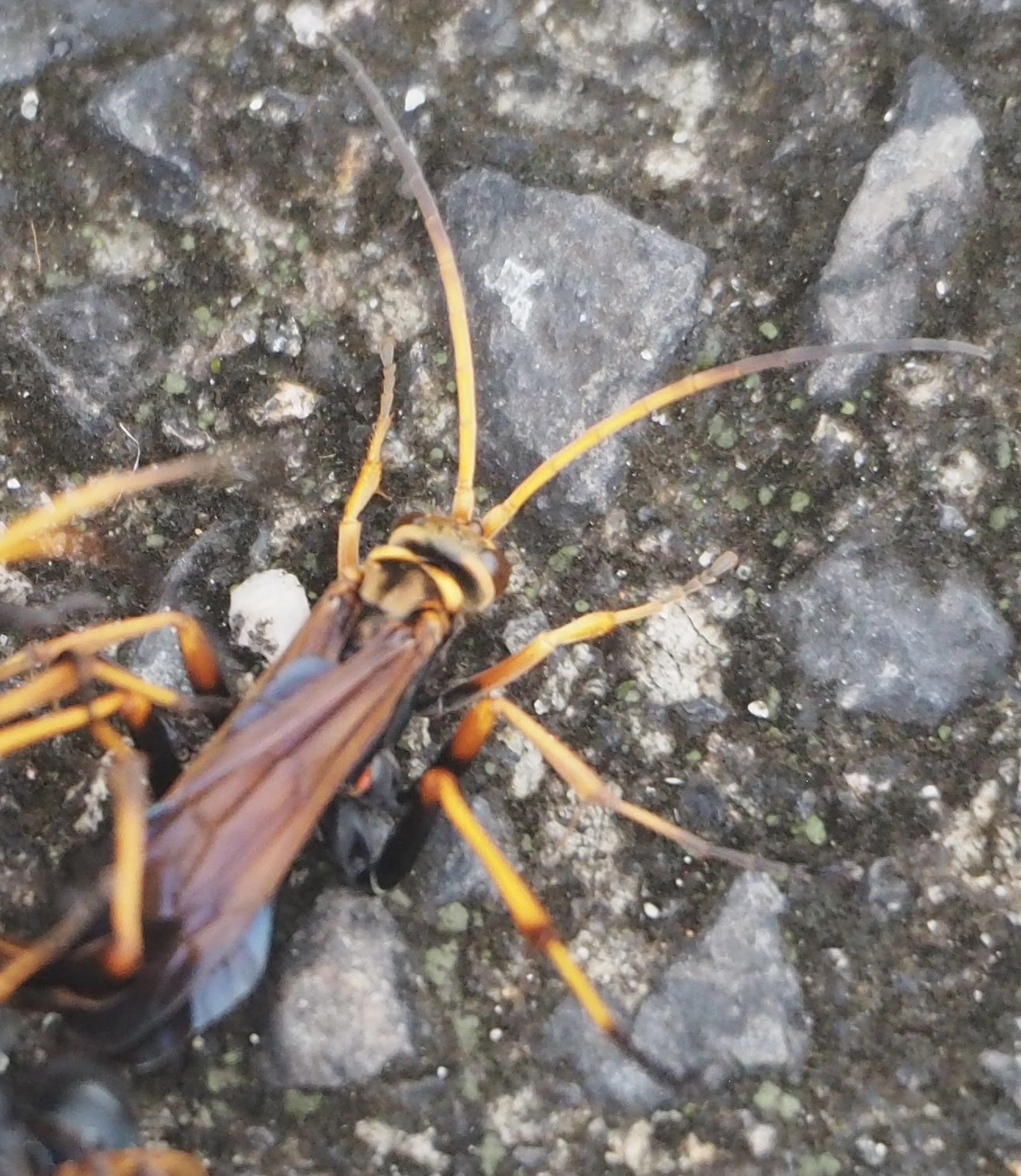

Scientific classification
- Kingdom: Animalia
- Phylum: Arthropoda
- Class: Insecta
- Order: Hymenoptera
- Family: Pompilidae
- Genus: Cyphononyx
- Species: C. fulvognathus

Binomial name
- Cyphononyx fulvognathus (Rohwer, 1911)

= Cyphononyx fulvognathus =

Species of insect

Cyphononyx fulvognathus is a species of insect from the genus Cyphononyx. It was originally described by Sievert Allen Rohwer in 1911.

Cyphononyx fulvognathus is a solitary wasp that can be found in south-east Asia, notably between Japan, Taiwan and the south of China. In Japan, it is the only species from the genus Cyphononyx. Females have a body length between 17.0 and 26.1 mm (0.67 and 1.03 in) and a forewing length between 15.1 and 22.0 mm (0.59 and 0.87 in). Males are notably smaller with a body length between 10.5 and 18.9 mm (0.41 and 0.74 in)1 and a forewing length between 10.9 and 17.6 mm (0.43 and 0.69 in).

== Range ==
The documented distribution of C. fulvognathus ranges from Japan, through Taiwan to south China. This is confirmed with recent observations through crowd-sourcing initiatives, which also observes the species in South Korea.

== Similar species ==
Cyphononyx fulvognathus is similar to Cyphononyx peregrinus found from India to south China. In C. fulvognathus the vertex is more strongly raised between eye tops. Both males and females of this species typically have wings that are a yellowish-brown color. In males, the genitalia are different too.
