= William J. Fox =

American officer and engineer (1897–1993)

Brigadier General William J. Fox
- Fox as a colonel c. 1942–1947
- Born: William Joseph Fox; December 23, 1897; Trenton, New Jersey, U.S.
- Died: April 11, 1993 (aged 95) Fillmore, California, U.S.
- Buried: Trenton, New Jersey, U.S.
- Allegiance: United States
- Branch: United States Army; United States Marine Corps Reserve
- Service years: 1918–1932 (Army); 1932–1947 (USMCR)
- Rank: Brigadier general
- Commands: VMS-7R USMCR squadron; Marine Corps Air Station El Toro; Henderson Field
- Conflicts: World War II; Guadalcanal campaign (WIA)
- Awards: Legion of Merit; Distinguished Flying Cross; Purple Heart; Air Medal (x3)
- Alma mater: University of Southern California; Loyola Law School

Brigadier General William Joseph Fox (December 23, 1897 – April 11, 1993) was a United States Marine Corps Reserve officer and engineer. Fox oversaw the construction of various military airfields, including Marine Corps Air Station El Toro in Irvine, California, and Henderson Field in Guadalcanal, both of which he commanded. Fox also served as a civil engineer for Los Angeles County from 1923 to 1955, after which he moved to Mexico, where he became a charro (a Mexican horse rider). The General William J. Fox Airfield in Lancaster, California, is named after him.

== Early life ==
William Joseph Fox was born on December 23, 1897, in Trenton, New Jersey. He graduated from high school in 1915 and completed an apprenticeship in carpentry.

== Military career ==
=== Pre-World War II ===
In 1918, Fox enlisted in the United States Army. He trained and studied at the University of Southern California (USC). Fox was selected to join officer candidate school, and by 1925, he attained the rank of sergeant. Beginning in 1925, Fox took flying lessons at Mines Field, the modern-day Los Angeles International Airport, and after obtaining his pilot license, was a flight instructor. In 1926, Fox became a military officer and was given the rank of second lieutenant. He was promoted to first lieutenant in 1929, but resigned his commission in 1932. By then, he had accumulated 200 flying hours and he was commissioned into the United States Marine Corps Reserve as a student pilot with the rank of first lieutenant. He earned his Wings of Gold once he completed his student pilot program. He eventually returned to USC where, in 1937, he graduated as a Bachelor of Engineering.

Sometime after graduating from USC, Fox attended the Loyola Law School. In 1923, he began working as a civil engineer for Los Angeles County, and in 1926, he became the chief engineer of the Los Angeles County Planning Commission. In 1933, following the Long Beach earthquake, Fox was appointed as the chief engineer of the Department of Building and Safety and the coordinator of Public Works and Grants. He also served as a member of the California State Planning Commission from 1934 to 1937. During World War II, Fox received a leave of absence from Los Angeles County and retained all of his positions with the county.

On December 16, 1940, Fox became the commander of the VMS-7R United States Marine Corps Reserve squadron in Long Beach, California. In March 1941, Fox played the role of a stunt double for actor Errol Flynn in the film Dive Bomber. He was later inducted in the Hollywood Stuntman's Hall of Fame for his role in the film.

=== World War II ===
Following the Japanese attack on Pearl Harbor, Fox was activated from the Marine Corps Reserve to active service. During World War II, Fox flew bombers and constructed military bases, some of which he commanded. In 1942, he selected three Marine Corps Air Stations (MCAS)—Mojave (Auxiliary), El Centro, and Santa Barbara—and constructed a fourth—El Toro—to train pilots and crews for service in the Pacific Theater of World War II. Fox also designed four more military bases in southern California, including the Los Alamitos Airfield. After making these selections, Fox was mobilized to the Pacific Theater himself.

Fox oversaw the construction of the Henderson Field in Guadalcanal and later commanded the airfield. On January 31, 1943, Fox suffered a spinal injury when he fell off a 40-foot high bluff during a Japanese bombing of Guadalcanal for which he received a Purple Heart. After his injury, he returned to the United States and served as the commander of MCAS El Toro from 1943 to 1944, during which, he flew a captured Japanese Mitsubishi A6M Zero as part of an aerial demonstration in San Diego. He was promoted to brigadier general in 1947 upon which he retired from military service.

=== Post-World War II ===
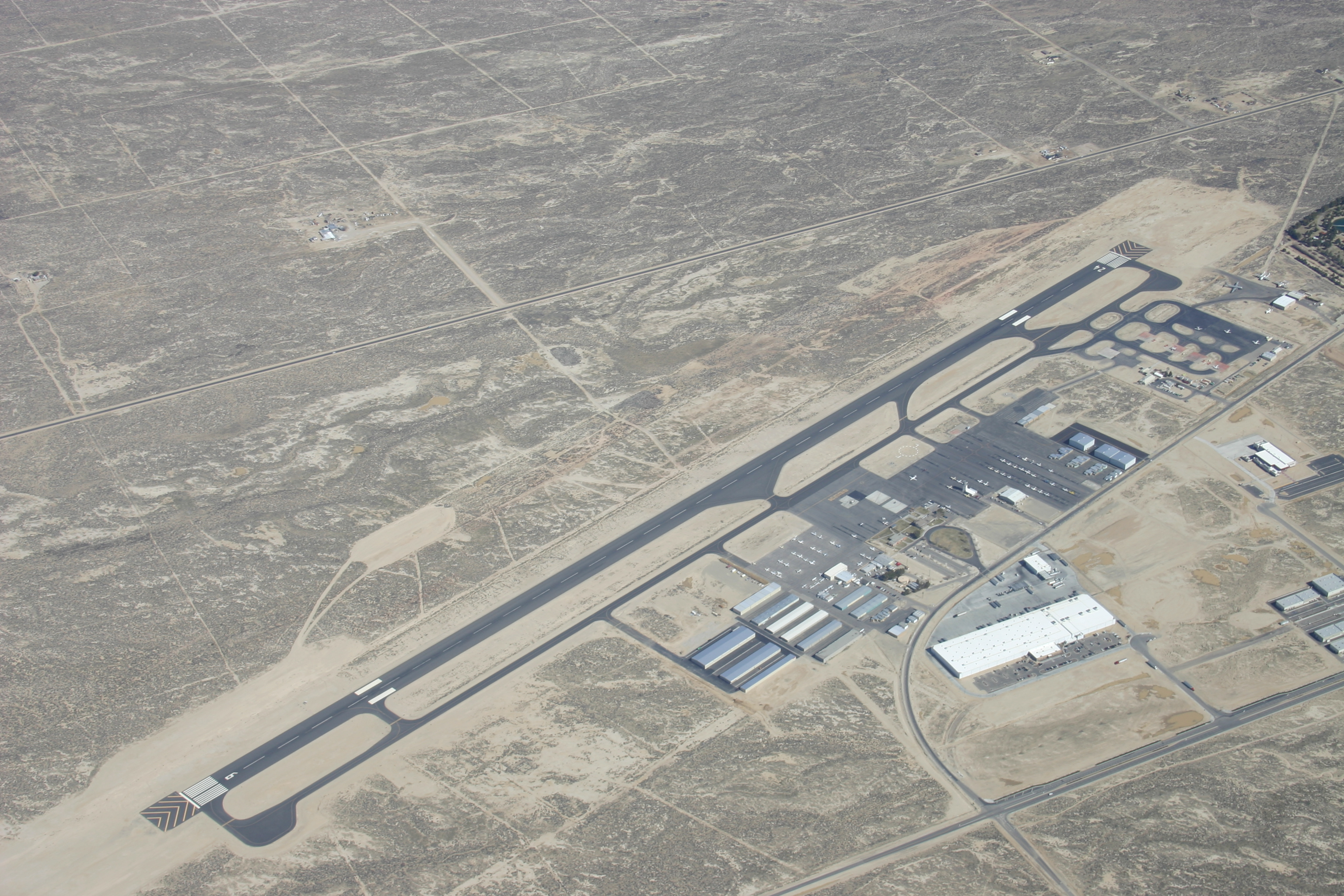
The General William J. Fox Airfield was named after Fox in 1959

In 1951, Fox was given the title of "county engineer" and oversaw five of Los Angeles county's engineering departments. In 1954, Fox recommended the construction of an airfield in the Antelope Valley; his recommendation was approved by the Los Angeles County Board of Supervisors, and on November 14, 1959, the General William J. Fox Airfield was inaugurated and named in his honor. Fox retired from civil engineering in 1955 and resigned from his local government positions.

== Later life and death ==
In 1959, Fox moved to San Miguel de Allende, Mexico, where he wanted to learn the Spanish language so that he could move to Spain to retire. While there, however, he stated that he "liked the horses, the surrounding country and the people I met" and eventually remained in Mexico and became a charro, a type of Mexican horse rider. He became a member of the San Miguel charro team and later the Mexico national charro team. While in Mexico, Time columnist Ed Ainsworth described Fox becoming a charro as "utterly incredible" due to Fox's American heritage, stating that charros were the "most exclusive organization of strictly Mexican horsemen imaginable". Fox lived in Mexico until 1981 when he returned to the United States and settled in Fillmore, California.

Fox died in Fillmore on April 11, 1993. He was buried in Trenton.

== Dates of ranks ==
The following table lists the ranks Fox held and his dates of promotion:

Insignia	Rank	Service branch	Date of promotion
Private	Private	Army	1918
Corporal	Corporal	Army	19??
Sergeant	Sergeant	Army	1925
Second Lieutenant	Second lieutenant	Army	1926
First Lieutenant	First lieutenant	Army	1929
First Lieutenant	First lieutenant	Marine Corps Reserve	1932
Captain	Captain	Marine Corps Reserve	193?
Major	Major	Marine Corps Reserve	1938
Lieutenant Colonel	Lieutenant colonel	Marine Corps Reserve	1942
Colonel	Colonel	Marine Corps Reserve	1942
Brigadier General	Brigadier general	Marine Corps Reserve	1947

== Awards and decorations ==
Fox's awards and decorations included the Legion of Merit with "V" device, the Distinguished Flying Cross, the Purple Heart, and the Air Medal with two oak leaf clusters. He also received a special letter from United States Secretary of the Navy James Forrestal for commanding the VMS-7R USMCR squadron for 4 years.
