= General William J. Fox Airfield =

General aviation airport in California, United States

General Wm. J. Fox Airfield
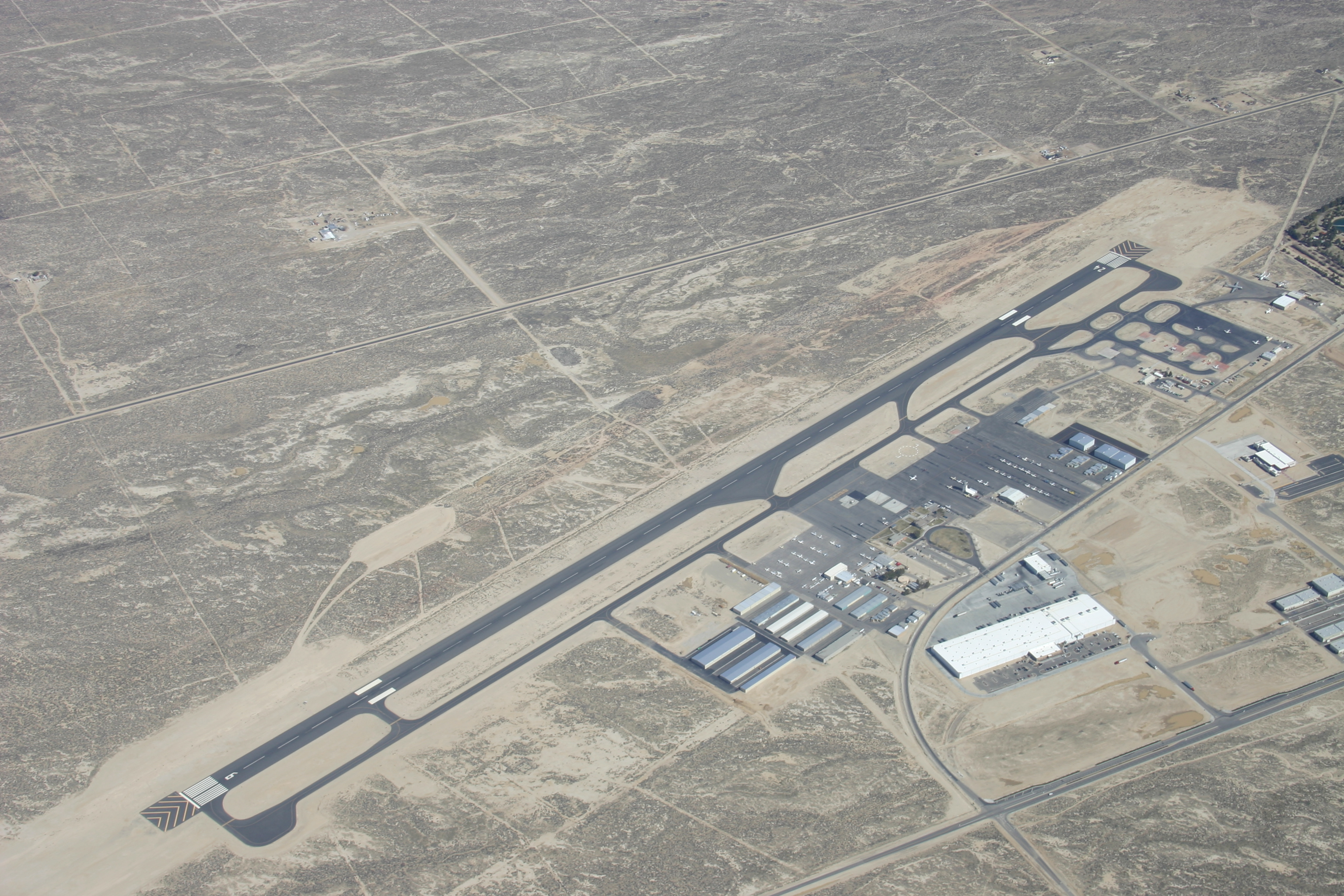
- Fox Field (February 2008)
- IATA: WJF; ICAO: KWJF; FAA LID: WJF

Summary
- Airport type: Public
- Owner: County of Los Angeles
- Serves: Lancaster, California
- Elevation AMSL: 2,351 ft (717 m)
- Coordinates: 34°44′28″N 118°13′07″W

Map
- Location of airport in California

Runways
Direction	Length		Surface
Direction	ft	m	Surface
6/24	7,201	2,195	Asphalt

Statistics (2021)
- Aircraft operations: 48,184
- Based aircraft: 60
- Source: Federal Aviation Administration

General William J. Fox Airfield (IATA: WJF, ICAO: KWJF, FAA LID: WJF) is a county-owned, public airport in Los Angeles County, California, five miles northwest of Lancaster, California, United States. Locally known as Fox Field, the airport serves the Antelope Valley. The airport is named after Brigadier General William J. Fox, "a Marine war hero, a movie stunt man, the first Los Angeles County engineer and, for 20 years after his retirement, a cowboy."

The National Plan of Integrated Airport Systems for 2011–2015 categorized it as a general aviation facility. The airport has limited scheduled cargo operations. The U.S. Forest Service has a fixed wing airtanker and helicopter base on the airfield which becomes one of the main hubs in the region for aerial firefighting suppression efforts during fire season.

== Historical airline service ==
Fox Field had scheduled passenger air service as early as the late 1950s operated by Southwest Airways with Douglas DC-3 aircraft primarily to the Los Angeles International Airport (LAX). Southwest Airways then changed its name to Pacific Air Lines which in 1959 was operating new Fairchild F-27 turboprops from the airport nonstop to Las Vegas and also to Burbank Airport (BUR, now Hollywood Burbank Airport, previously Bob Hope Airport) on a daily basis as well as operating Martin 4-0-4 and DC-3 prop aircraft on flights to LAX. By 1960, Pacific was operating daily F-27 propjet flights to San Francisco (SFO) from Fox Field via a stop in Bakersfield and also nonstop to LAX. In 1968, Pacific Air Lines merged with Bonanza Air Lines and West Coast Airlines to form Air West which in turn continued to serve the airport with F-27 flights to LAX. Also in 1968, Cable Commuter Airlines was operating de Havilland Canada DHC-6 Twin Otter service to LAX. Air West then changed its name to Hughes Airwest which continued to operate scheduled passenger service with the Fairchild F-27 turboprop primarily to Los Angeles International Airport during the early 1970s with several nonstop flights a day. By 1983, Mojave Airlines was operating flights to LAX, San Diego, Ontario and Mammoth Yosemite Airport with Beechcraft C99 turboprops. In 1985, commuter air carrier Desert Sun Airlines was operating up to five flights a day nonstop to LAX with Beechcraft 99 turboprops.

Fox Field currently does not have any scheduled passenger flights, with the nearest airline service being available at the Hollywood Burbank Airport in Burbank.

== Facilities ==
General William J. Fox Airfield covers 1,217 acres (493 ha) at an elevation of 2,351 feet (717 m) above sea level. Its one runway, 6/24, is 7,201 by 150 feet (2,195 x 46 m) asphalt.

In the year ending December 31, 2021, the airport had 48,184 aircraft operations, average 132 per day: 97% general aviation, 3% military, and 1% air taxi. 60 aircraft were then based at this airport: 56 single-engine, 2 multi-engine, and 2 glider.

== Airlines and destinations ==
=== Cargo ===
Airlines	Destinations
Ameriflight	Ontario International Airport
FedEx Feeder	Ontario International Airport

== Accidents and incidents ==
- On October 17, 1978, a Learjet 24 owned by Martin Aviation cartwheeled during takeoff which was part of a touch and go. Out of two occupants on board, one died.
