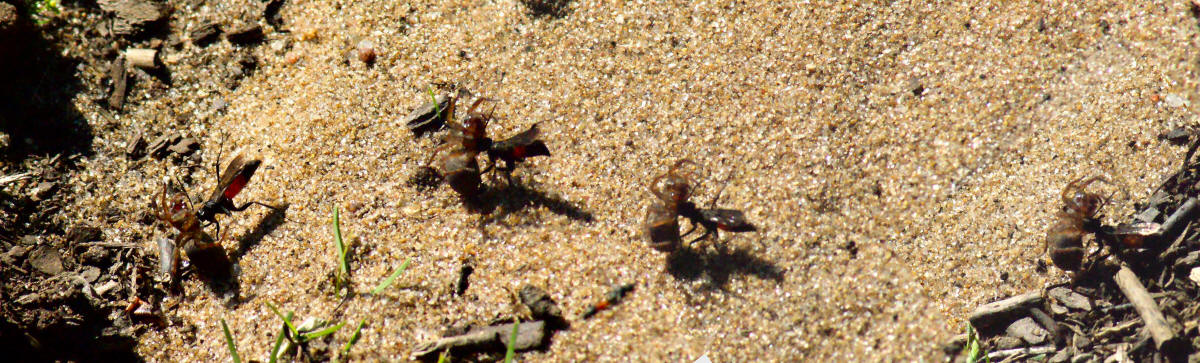
- Anoplius infuscatus dragging a spider

Scientific classification
- Kingdom: Animalia
- Phylum: Arthropoda
- Clade: Pancrustacea
- Class: Insecta
- Order: Hymenoptera
- Family: Pompilidae
- Genus: Anoplius
- Species: A. infuscatus

Binomial name
- Anoplius infuscatus (Vander Linden, 1827)

Synonyms
- Arachnophroctonus infuscatus (Vander Linden, 1827); Pompilus argentatus (Tournier, 1890); Pompilus calcatus Tournier, 1890; Pompilus chalybeatus Schioedte, 1837; Pompilus difformis Schioedte, 1837; Pompilus dispar Dahlbom, 1843; Anoplius fortunatus Wolf, 1975; Anoplius lusitanicus Wolf & Diniz, 1970; Pompilus meticulosus Costa, 1882; Pompilus minor Herrich-Schäffer, 1830; Pompilus onus Tournier. 1890; Anoplius petulans Haupt, 1962; Pompilus sabulicola Thomson, 1874; Pompilus sericatus Shuckard, 1835; Anoplius simii Wolf, 1978; Pompilus stellatus Tournier, 1890; Pompilus utendus Tournier, 1890; Pompilus vivus Tournier, 1890; Pompilus xysticus Tournier, 1890; Pompilus aerarius Tournier, 1890; Pompilus aeruginosus Tournier, 1890

= Anoplius infuscatus =

Species of wasp

Anoplius infuscatus is a species of spider wasp found mainly in Eurasia.

== Distribution ==
A. infuscatus occurs in Europe (including southern Britain) and North Africa, east to the Pacific.

== Identification ==
A. infuscatus is about ten mm in length and resemble the Arachnospila wasps with which they are often found in appearance and behaviour. The colouring of A. infuscatus is less red than orange and its wing venation also differs from all members of Arachnospila.

== Habitat ==
This species prefers moist sandy areas, especially near the coast.

== Biology ==
Xerolycosa nemoralis, Alopecosa trabalis, Trochosa ruricola and Pardosa monticola spiders are recorded as prey but A. infuscatus is also suspected to feed on other members of the families Lycosidae, Agelenidae and Thomisidae. Adults nectar on Heracleum sphondylium and other members of the Apiaceae. Prey is captured following an active hunt and paralysed within the spider's own burrow or other hiding place, e.g. under a stone while the nest burrow is constructed. The spider is then dragged to the wasp's nest burrow and the wasp begins to construct a cell in which to place the spider. Commencement of cell construction is indicated by the wasp entering and leaving the nesting burrow head first, meaning it can turn around in the burrow. Sometimes the wasp amputates some of the spider's legs before placing into the burrow. The wasp lays its egg on the gaster of the spider.

Kleptoparasitic behaviour has been recorded, both intraspecific and from Anoplius concinnus. In the latter case, the A. infuscatus female entered the nest of its congener, destroyed the egg already on the spider and placed one of its own. Interaction with ants can disturb the wasp while it is transporting the prey and this can cause it to hide the prey by placing it higher up in grass. There is also a case of parasitism by the fly of the family Sarcophagidae, probably Sarcophaga socrus, while the spider-wasps Ceropales maculata, Ceropales cribrata and Evagetes argenteodecoratus have been recorded as interspecific kleptoparasites.

The flight period in Britain is from June to September and it does not overwinter as an adult.
