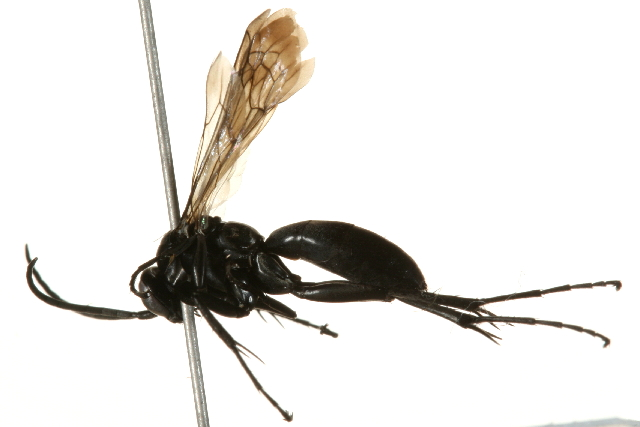
- Anoplius nigerrimus preserved specimen

Scientific classification
- Kingdom: Animalia
- Phylum: Arthropoda
- Class: Insecta
- Order: Hymenoptera
- Family: Pompilidae
- Genus: Anoplius
- Species: A. nigerrimus

Binomial name
- Anoplius nigerrimus (Scopoli, 1763)

Synonyms
- Sphex nigerrimus Scopoli, 1763; Pompilus incisus Tischbein, 1850; Pompilus excerptus Tournier, 1889; Pompilus nigerrimus var. kohli Verhoeff, 1892; Anoplius wheeleri Banks, 1939; Anoplius banksi Dreisbach, 1950

= Anoplius nigerrimus =

Species of wasp

Anoplius nigerrimus is a species of spider wasp, or pompilid, and is the type species of the genus Anoplius.

== Description and identification ==
They are mostly black and the females are 6–8 mm long while males measure 5–8 mm. This species may be distinguished from the related A. caviventris and A. concinnus by the triangular rather than quadrilateral third submarginal cell of the forewing and the shorter setae, or hairs, on the thorax and abdomen.

== Distribution ==
A. nigerrimus is a Holarctic species found from Northern and Central Europe eastwards across Asia to the Pacific Coast and in North America from the Yukon to Newfoundland. It is widespread in Great Britain and Ireland.

== Habitat ==
Unlike other species of the genus Anoplius, A. nigerrimus does not show a preference for damp habitats and occurs in drier habitats such as grassland and scrub, the males are frequently encountered running over short vegetation.

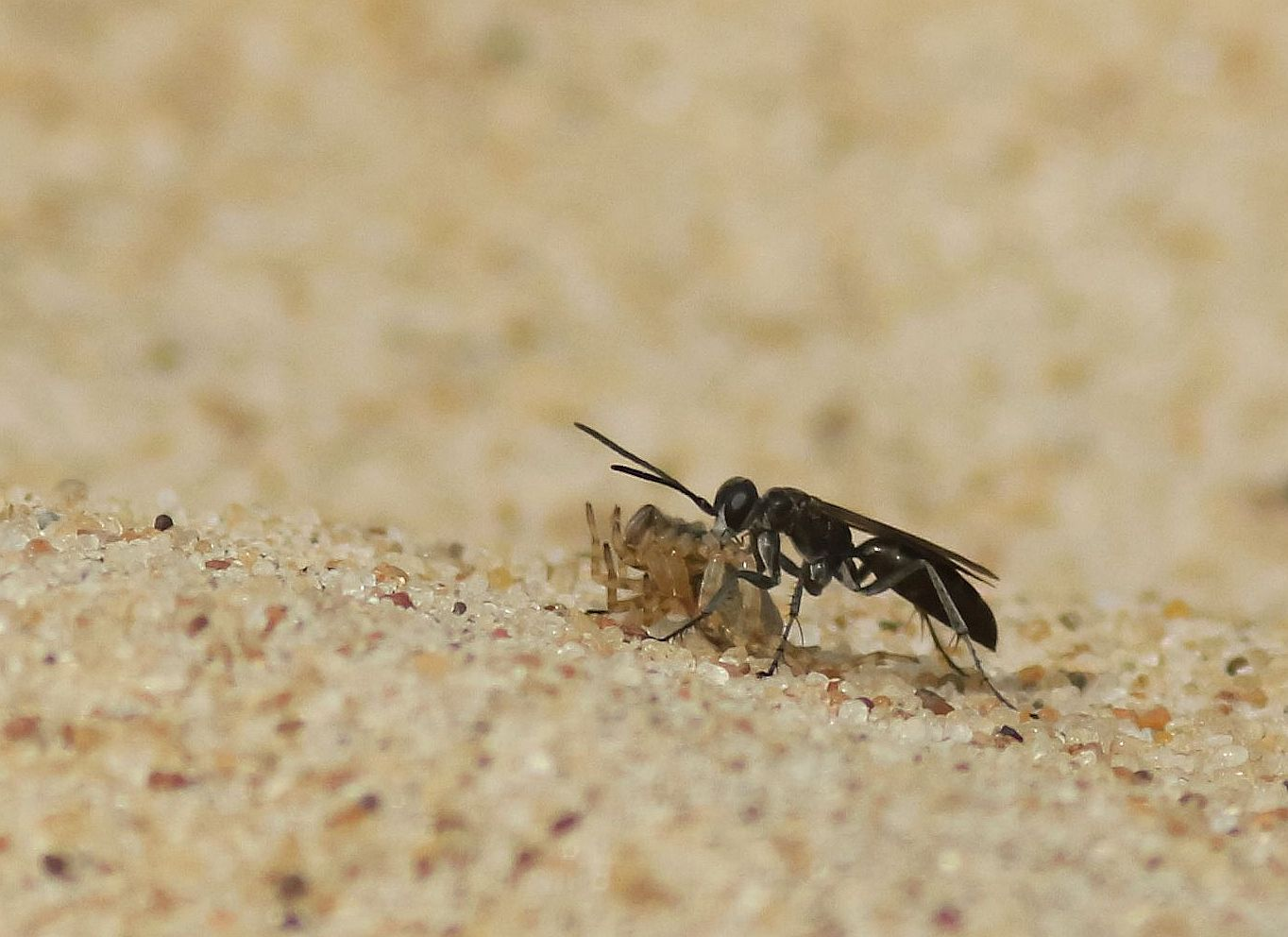
Anoplius nigerrimus carrying prey.

== Biology ==
The flight period in Great Britain is May to September, although in northern California adults have been collected in May, June and July. Prey collected by A. nigerrimus include spiders from the families Lycosidae, Gnaphosidae and Pisauridae. A nigerrimus builds nests under stones, in cavities in stone walls, in hollow plant stems, in deserted burrows of ants, bees or wasps, and in empty snail shells. It can also dig a burrow and build cells in friable soil. One nest of four cells was found under a stone on moorland at an altitude of 400 m in Glen Tilt, near Blair Atholl, Perthshire. Flowers visited include umbellifers such as wild carrot and Heracleum sphondylium. The eulophid wasp, Tetrastichus pompilicola has been reared from larvae of A. nigerrimus in Newfoundland.
