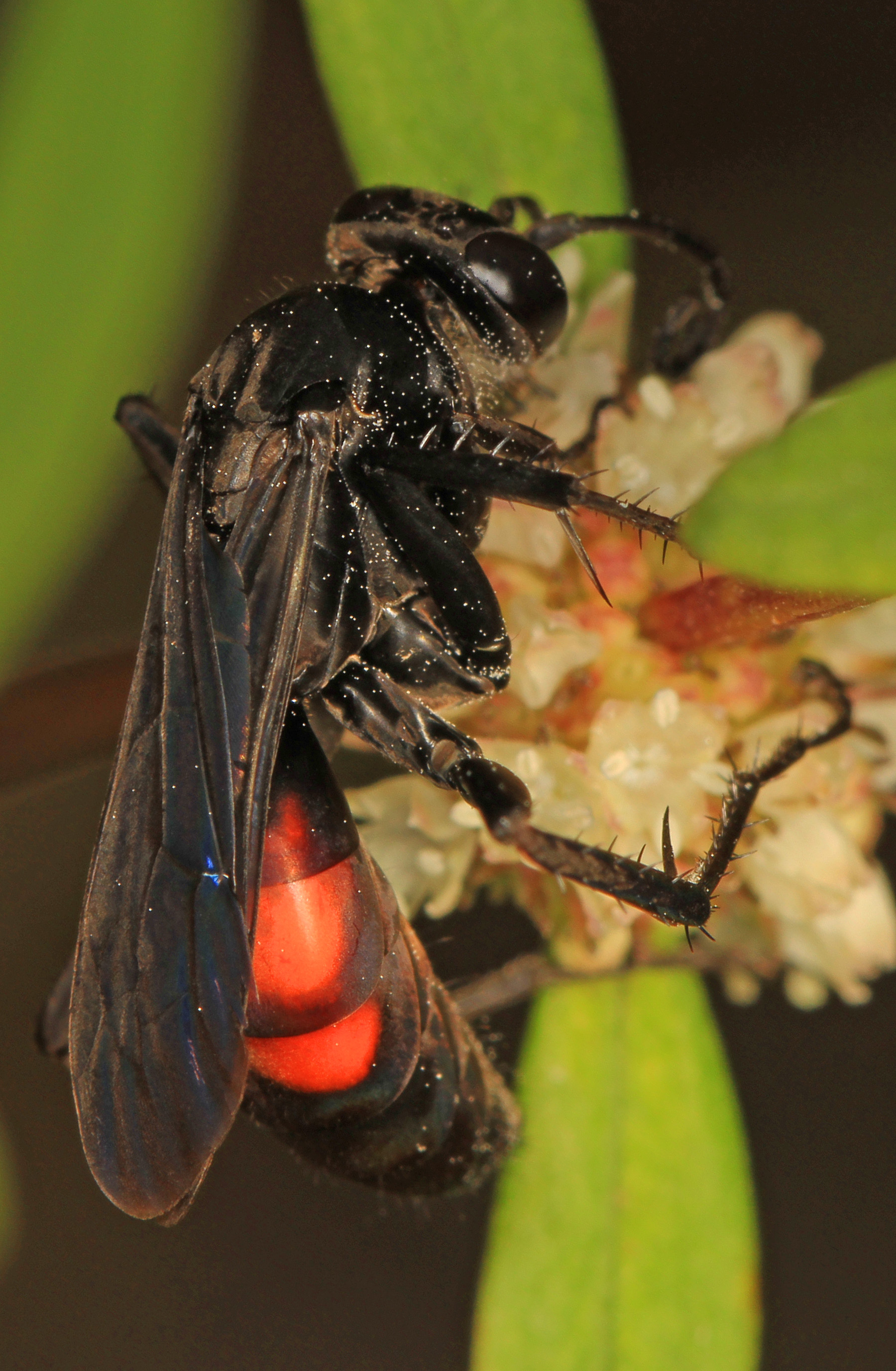
- Anoplius americanus, Big Cypress National Preserve, Ochopee, Florida

Scientific classification
- Domain: Eukaryota
- Kingdom: Animalia
- Phylum: Arthropoda
- Class: Insecta
- Order: Hymenoptera
- Family: Pompilidae
- Genus: Anoplius
- Species: A. americanus

Binomial name
- Anoplius americanus (Beauvois, 1811)

= Anoplius americanus =

Species of wasp

Anoplius americanus is a species of blue-black spider wasp which is widely distributed in the New World.

== Description ==
Anoplius americanus is approximately 20 mm in length. It is almost completely black, except for bright orange spots on the second and third segments on the abdomen which are specifically distinct.

== Habitat and Ecology ==
Adults have been observed nectaring on flowers of the families Apiaceae, Asteraceae, Lamiaceae and Polygonaceae. Like other members of the genus Anoplius the predominant prey is likely to be wolf spiders of the family Lycosidae.

== Distribution ==
Anoplius americanus can be found in North America, Central America, and the West Indies.
