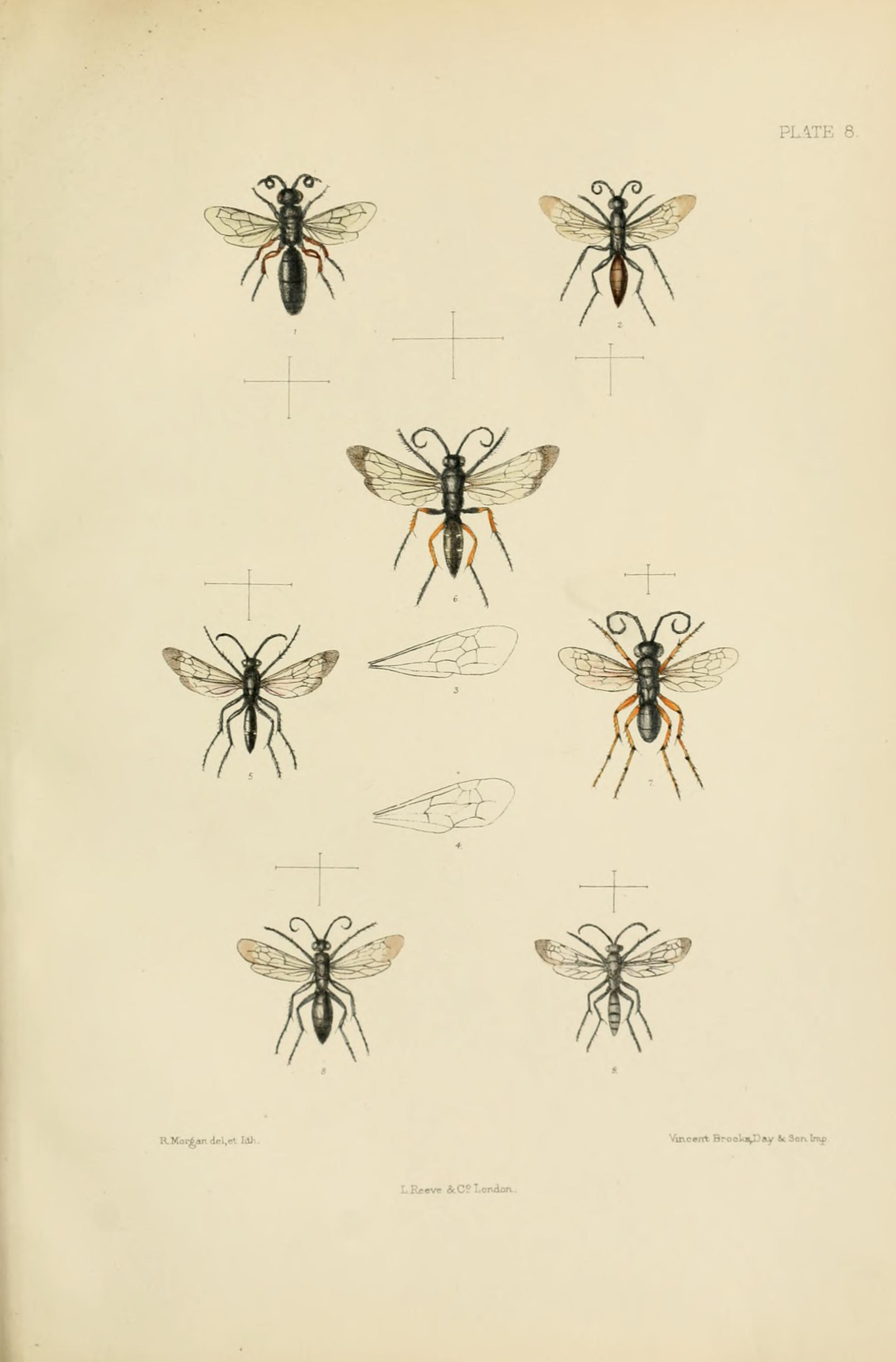
- Anoplius concinnus figure 8

Scientific classification
- Domain: Eukaryota
- Kingdom: Animalia
- Phylum: Arthropoda
- Class: Insecta
- Order: Hymenoptera
- Family: Pompilidae
- Genus: Anoplius
- Species: A. concinnus

Binomial name
- Anoplius concinnus (Dahlbom, 1843)

Synonyms
- Anoplius concinus Dahlberg, Pompilus approximates (Smith, 1877); Pompilus bifidus (Morawitz, 1891); Pompilus distinguendus (Morawitz, 1891); Pompilus haereticus (Tournier, 1889); Pompilus vacillans (Wesmael, 1851)

= Anoplius concinnus =

Species of wasp

Anoplius concinnus is a widespread Eurasian species of spider wasp.

== Distribution ==
This species can be found throughout Europe as far west as Great Britain, North Africa and the Middle East and eastwards to Mongolia. In Britain it is found as far north as the Moray Firth

== Habitat and ecology ==
Adult wasps run on wet stones exposed in gravel stream beds, flying between them and the stream banks, and can also be found at the margins of pools formed in sand and gravel pits. The flight period is from June to September in Britain. In the northern German lowlands there may be two generations per year. A. concinnus overwinters in the last larval stage and the males appear from the end of May. The males often break into cells to mate with newly emerged females.

The prey of A. concinnus consist of spiders of the family Lycosidae. The wasps search for the spiders under stones. In sand pit pools, females prey on spiders that run over the surface of the very shallow water near the edges. Females excavate multiple cells beneath stones which are stocked with spiders. In north-west Germany, A. concinnus has been found nesting in urban areas between paving stones; nests may be as deep as 9 cm and contain up to seven cells. Spiders, which are captured after the cells have been excavated, are placed one in each cell. Females may rob each other's cells, and fighting may occur. Anoplius infuscatus has been recorded kleptoparasiting A. concinnus in Italy: female A. infuscatus may enter the nest of A. concinnus and destroy the egg already laid on the prey before placing one of its own.
