= Pseudopedinaspis =

Scientific classification
- Domain: Eukaryota
- Kingdom: Animalia
- Phylum: Arthropoda
- Class: Insecta
- Order: Hymenoptera
- Family: Pompilidae
- Subfamily: Ctenocerinae
- Genus: Pseudopedinaspis; Brauns, 1906

Type species
- Pseudopedinaspis marshalli Brauns, 1906

Species
- 3 species; see text

Synonyms
- Dromopompilus Heymons, 1915

Genus of wasps

Pseudopedinaspis is a genus of flightless African spider wasps from the subfamily Ctenocerinae. The genus name is feminine, following ICZN Article 30.1.2.

== Species ==
- Pseudopedinaspis fasciata Arnold, 1940
- Pseudopedinaspis marshalli Brauns, 1906
- Pseudopedinaspis sanguinolenta (Heymons, 1915)
