= Dorcadion auratum =

Scientific classification
- Kingdom: Animalia
- Phylum: Arthropoda
- Clade: Pancrustacea
- Class: Insecta
- Order: Coleoptera
- Suborder: Polyphaga
- Infraorder: Cucujiformia
- Family: Cerambycidae
- Genus: Dorcadion
- Species: D. auratum

Binomial name
- Dorcadion auratum Tournier, 1872

Synonyms
- Dorcadion lederi Kraatz, 1878

Species of beetle

Dorcadion auratum is a species of beetle in the family Cerambycidae. It was described by Henri Tournier in 1872. It is known from the Caucasus Mountains.
