= Anoplius illinoensis =

Scientific classification
- Domain: Eukaryota
- Kingdom: Animalia
- Phylum: Arthropoda
- Class: Insecta
- Order: Hymenoptera
- Family: Pompilidae
- Genus: Anoplius
- Species: A. illinoensis

Binomial name
- Anoplius illinoensis (Robertson)

Species of wasp

Anoplius illinoensis is a species of spider wasp in the family Pompilidae.
