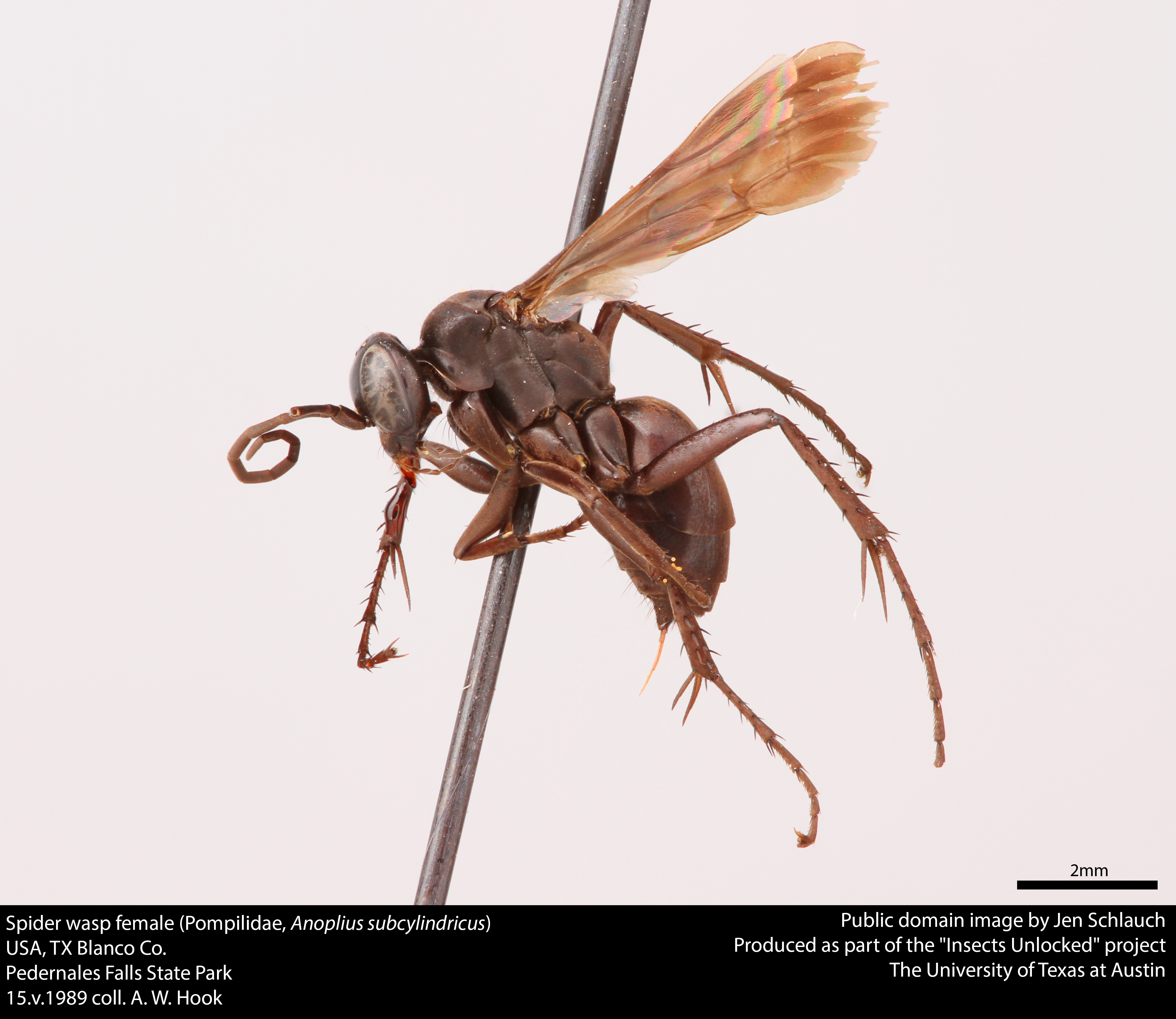

Scientific classification
- Kingdom: Animalia
- Phylum: Arthropoda
- Clade: Pancrustacea
- Class: Insecta
- Order: Hymenoptera
- Family: Pompilidae
- Genus: Anoplius
- Species: A. subcylindricus

Binomial name
- Anoplius subcylindricus (Banks)

= Anoplius subcylindricus =

Species of wasp

Anoplius subcylindricus is a species of spider wasp in the family Pompilidae.
