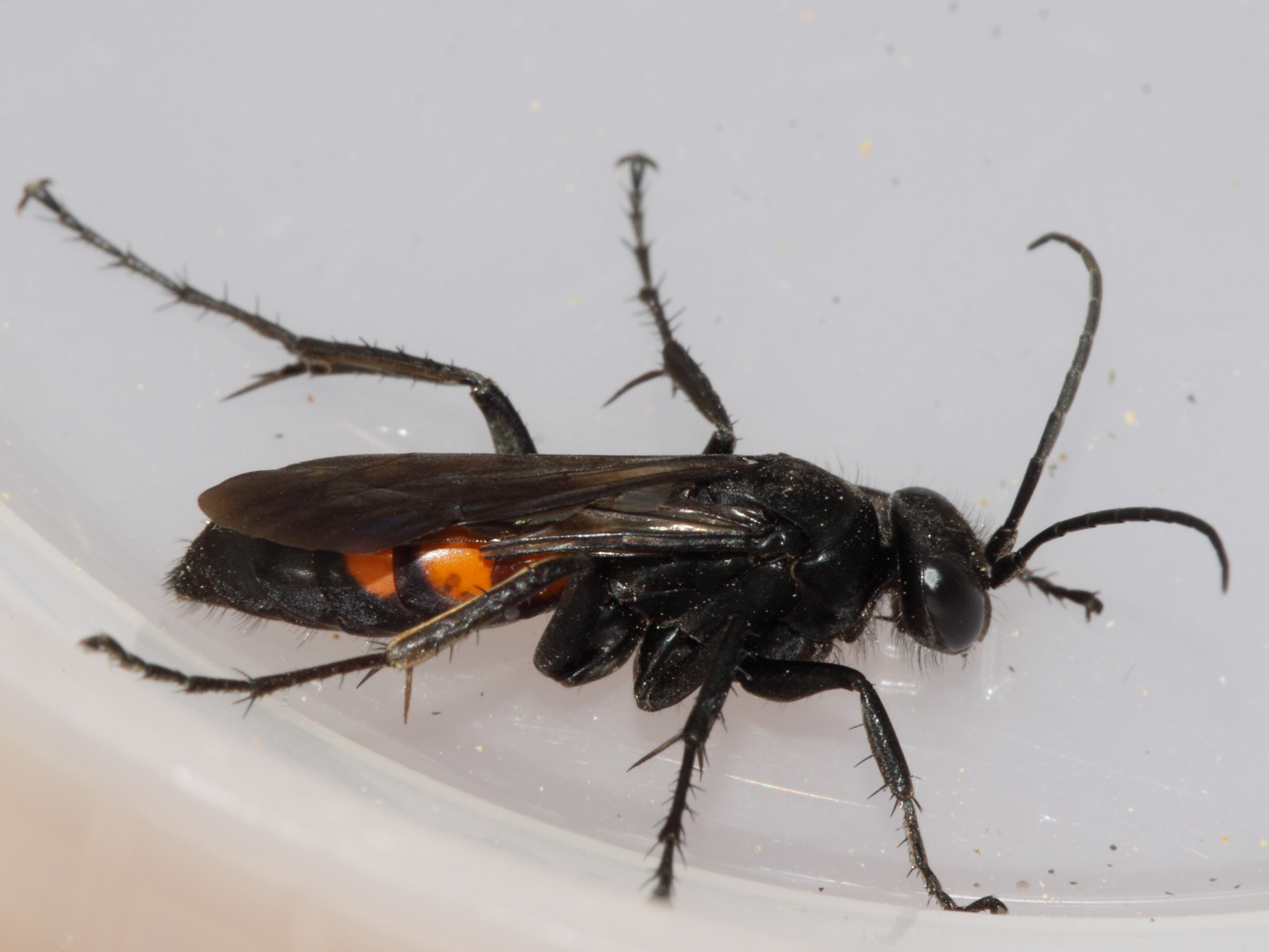

Scientific classification
- Kingdom: Animalia
- Phylum: Arthropoda
- Class: Insecta
- Order: Hymenoptera
- Family: Pompilidae
- Genus: Anoplius
- Species: A. viaticus

Binomial name
- Anoplius viaticus (Linnaeus, 1758)

Synonyms
- Sphex viaticus Linnaeus, 1758; Anoplius (Arachnophroctonus) haupti Guiglia, 1941; Anoplius fuscus (Linnaeus, 1761); Pompilus delatorius Tournier, 1890; Pompilus holomelas Mantero, 1905; Pompilus immixtus Tournier, 1890; Pompilus macrurus Tournier, 1890; Pompilus paganus Dahlbom, 1843; Pompilus pleropicus Tournier, 1890; Pompilus propinquus Smith, 1879; Pompilus tibialis Tournier, 1890; Pompilus valesicus Tournier, 1890; Sphex fusca Linnaeus, 1761

= Anoplius viaticus =

Species of wasp

Anoplius viaticus, commonly known as the black-banded spider wasp, is a species of spider wasp. These wasps are known as spider wasps because the females capture spiders to provide their offspring with food. The paralysed spider is cached in a burrow, the wasp lays an egg on it, and when this hatches, the developing wasp larva consumes the spider. This species is found in sandy heathland across most of Europe, and also the mountainous parts of eastern Africa and the temperate parts of South Africa.

== Description ==
A. viaticus is a large species of spider-hunting wasp and measures about 14 millimetres (0.55 in) in length. The head and thorax are black and the propodeum is fused to the thorax and bears erect black hairs. The first three tergites of the abdomen are red with black rear margins and the remainder of the abdomen is black. In Africa, the species is quite variable and Arnold described a number of varieties; in particular, the extent of the red colours on the abdomen varies, with the first two or three tergites of some specimens being entirely red or orange.

== Diet ==
Adult A. viaticus feed on nectar from flowers. Wasps in this species predominantly prey on spiders from the wolf spider family Lycosidae, but they also take ground spiders (Gnaphosidae), grass spiders (Agelenidae), crab spiders (Thomisidae) and jumping spiders (Salticidae).

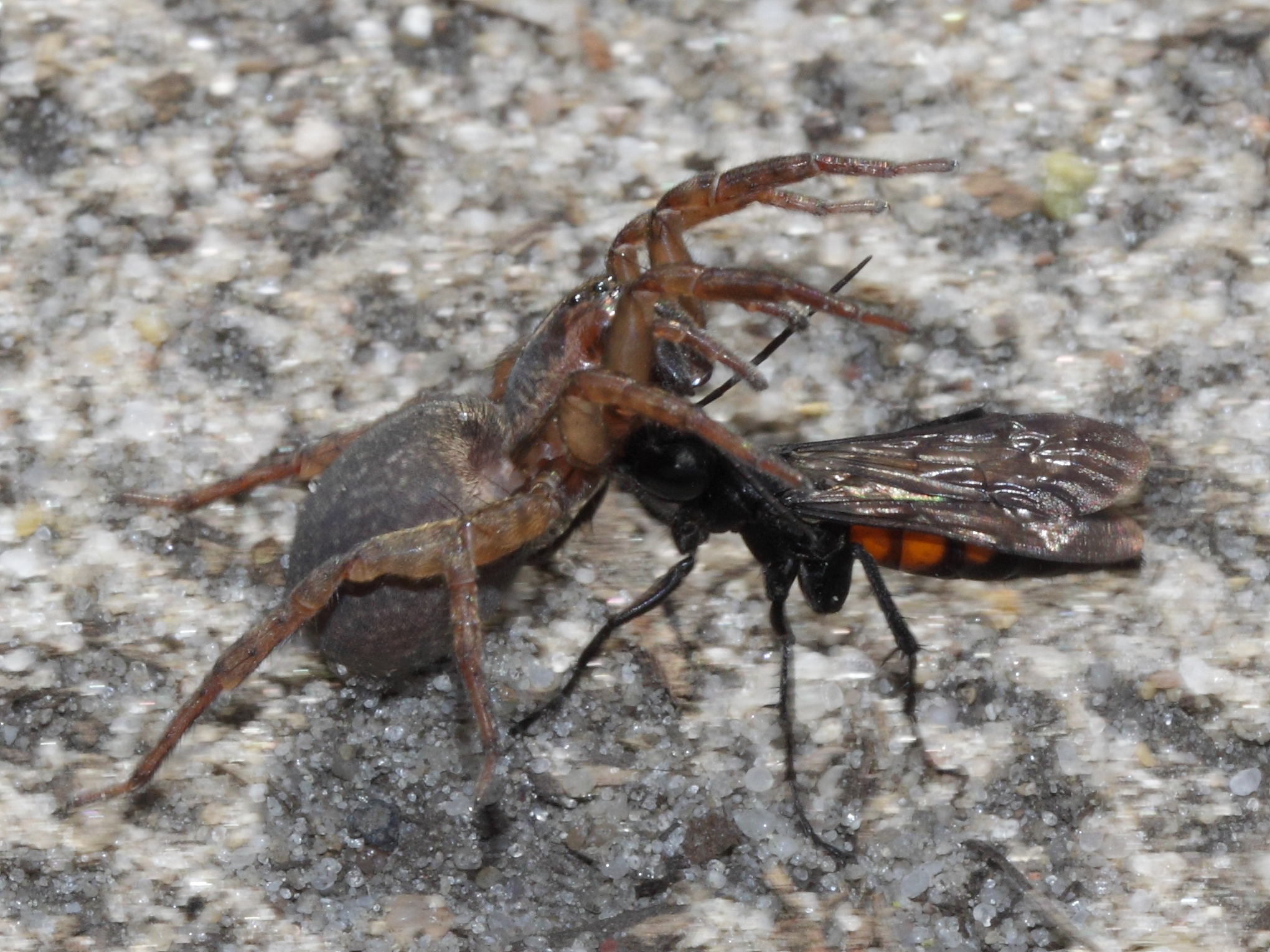
A spider wasp Anoplius viaticus with captured Trochosa terricola

== Biology ==
Anoplius viaticus is unusual in that it overwinters as an adult, hibernating in a deep burrow. This enables it to emerge and become active earlier in the year than other related species. In southern England, it is on the wing from March onwards.

The female A. viaticus searches for a suitable spider with which to provision its nest. The spider is injected with venom to paralyse it and is dragged back to the chosen nesting location. The wasp puts the spider down and digs a shallow burrow. The spider is then dragged into the burrow, the wasp lays an egg on its still-living body and plugs the burrow with soil. Further similar single cell nests are excavated and provisioned, usually in close proximity to the first.

Things do not always go according to plan. Other female wasps may try to steal the prey before it is brought to the nest site, or they may take it while the nest is being excavated. Wasps have been observed to deposit their paralysed prey in grassy areas, where it is perhaps less visible to conspecifics, while the nest burrow is dug. Even after the burrow is sealed, it is not entirely safe, as other wasps may try to unseal it and lay their eggs on the prey, a practice known as brood parasitism. Female wasps defend their nesting site and drive away conspecifics that come too close. They seem to be concerned for the safety of their future offspring because they frequently interrupt their hunting to return to the nest site, and the clustering of the burrows makes their defence easier.
