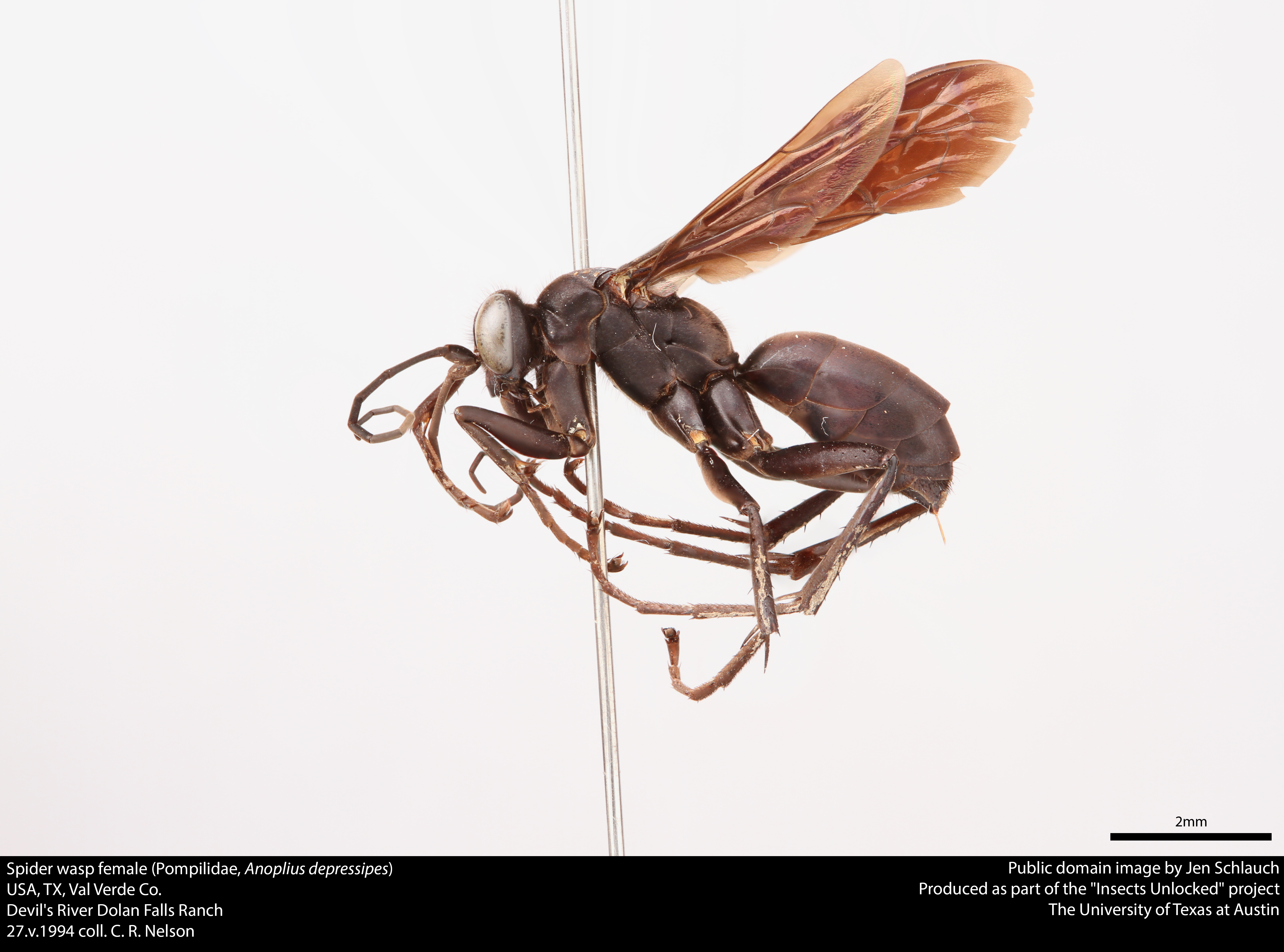
- Female

Scientific classification
- Kingdom: Animalia
- Phylum: Arthropoda
- Class: Insecta
- Order: Hymenoptera
- Family: Pompilidae
- Genus: Anoplius
- Species: A. depressipes

Binomial name
- Anoplius depressipes Banks

= Anoplius depressipes =

Species of wasp

Anoplius depressipes is a species of spider wasp in the family Pompilidae. It is a known predator of fishing spiders from the genus Dolomedes, and the wasp is highly adept at walking on the surface of water. It is also able to go underwater for a few minutes to sting and drag out spiders that attempt to escape by going beneath the surface.
