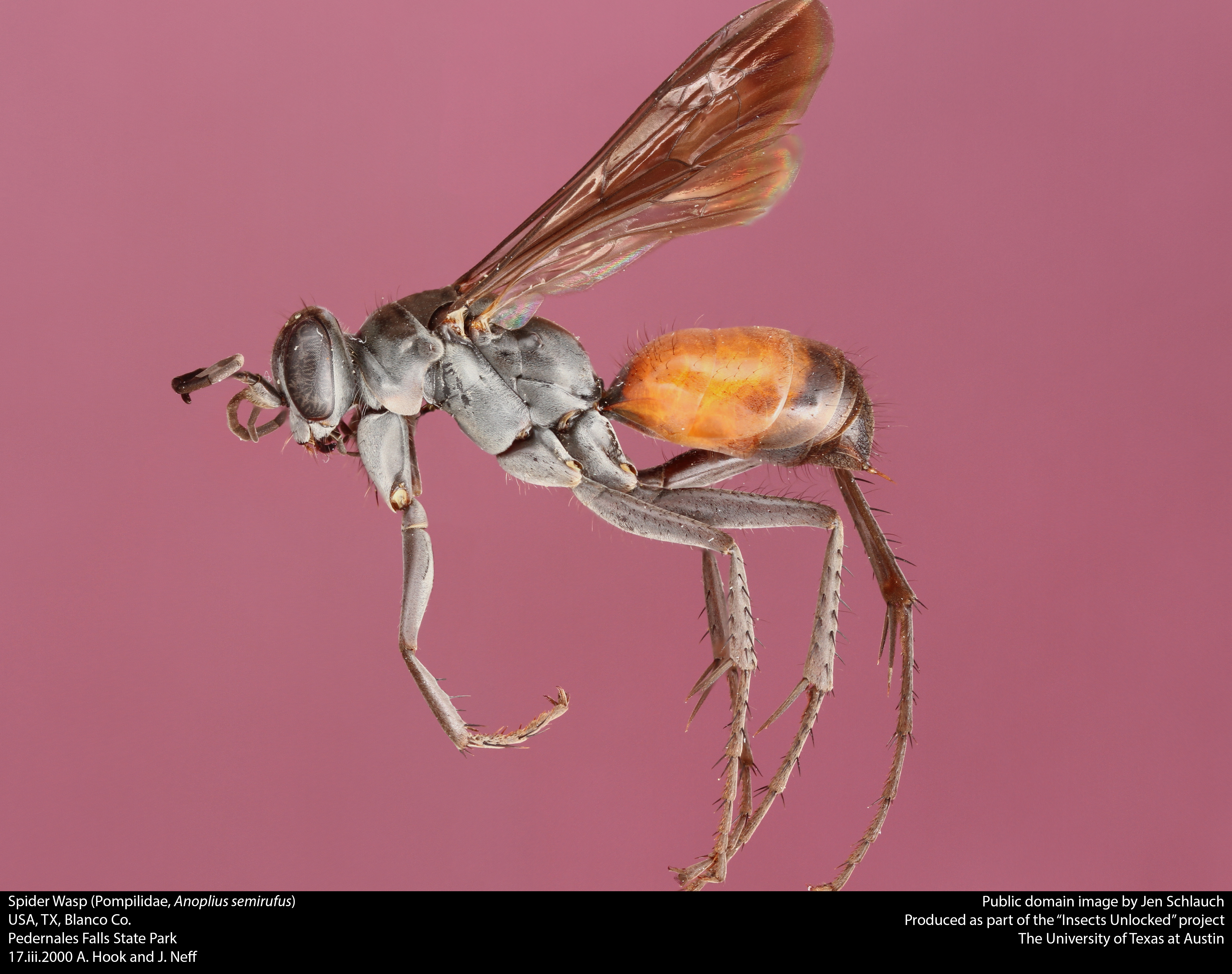
- Anoplius semirufus

Scientific classification
- Domain: Eukaryota
- Kingdom: Animalia
- Phylum: Arthropoda
- Class: Insecta
- Order: Hymenoptera
- Family: Pompilidae
- Genus: Anoplius
- Species: A. semirufus

Binomial name
- Anoplius semirufus (Cresson)

= Anoplius semirufus =

Species of wasp

Anoplius semirufus is a species of spider wasp in the family Pompilidae.
