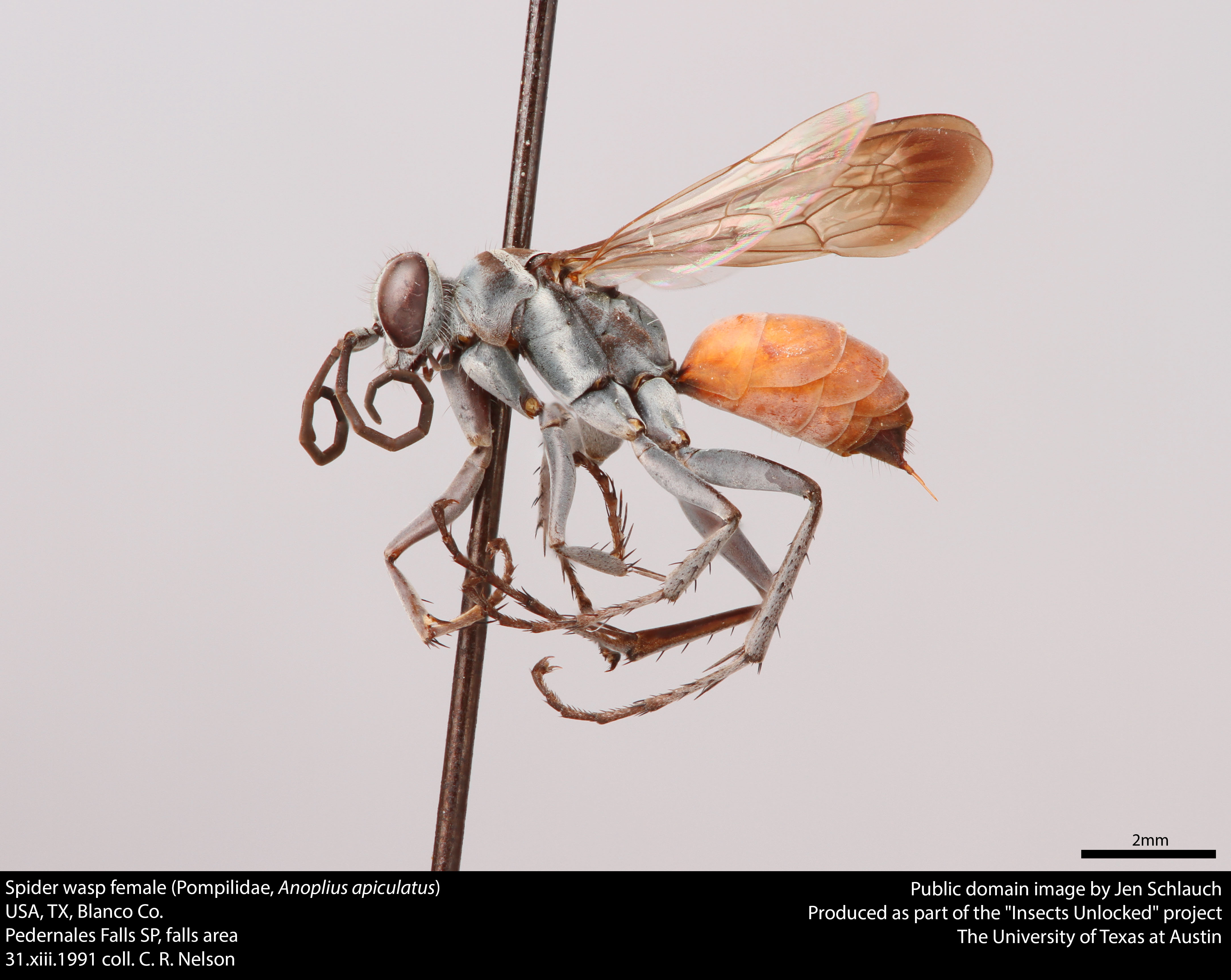
- Female

Scientific classification
- Domain: Eukaryota
- Kingdom: Animalia
- Phylum: Arthropoda
- Class: Insecta
- Order: Hymenoptera
- Family: Pompilidae
- Genus: Anoplius
- Species: A. apiculatus

Binomial name
- Anoplius apiculatus (Smith)

= Anoplius apiculatus =

Species of wasp

Anoplius apiculatus is a species of spider wasp in the family Pompilidae.
