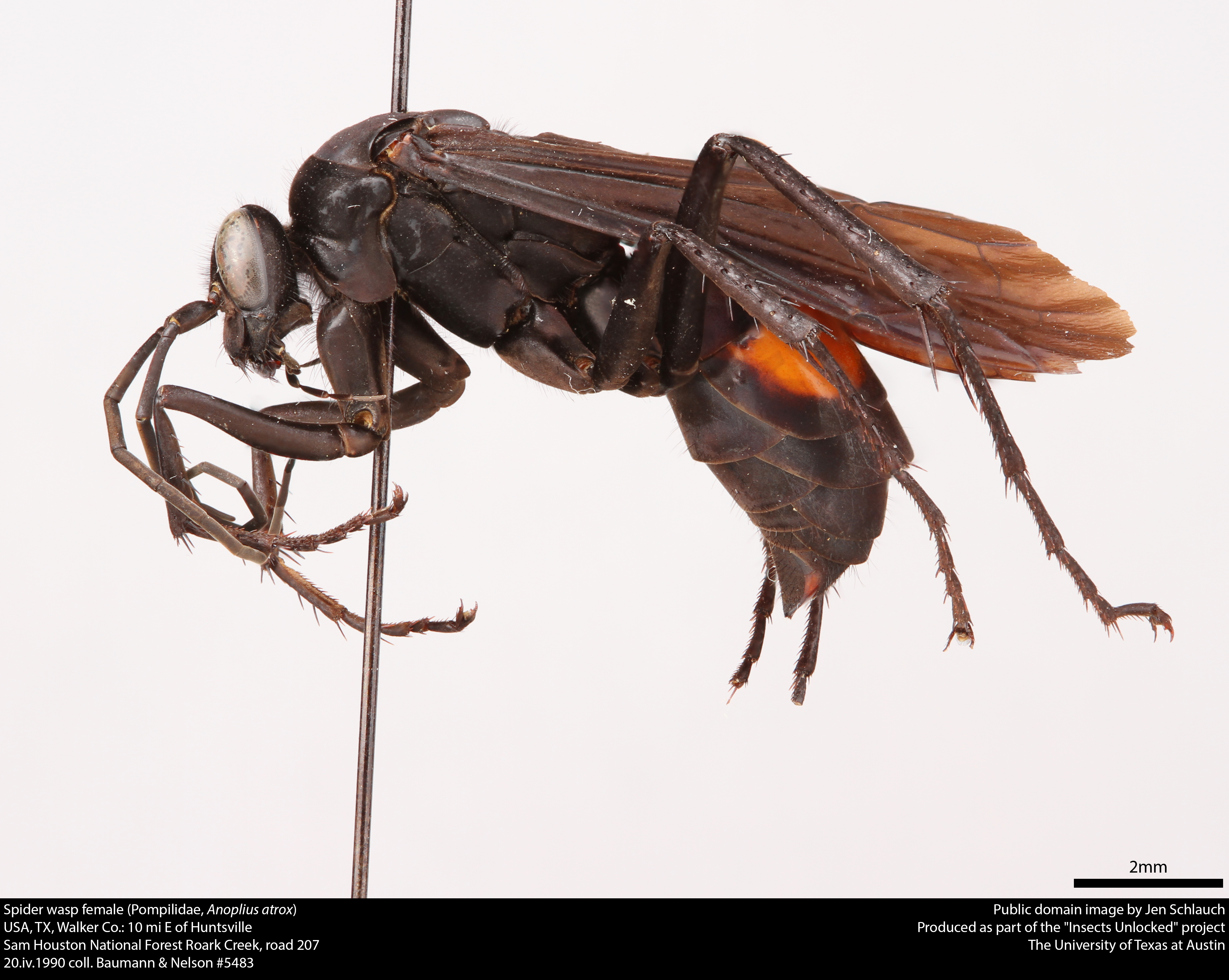
- Female

Scientific classification
- Domain: Eukaryota
- Kingdom: Animalia
- Phylum: Arthropoda
- Class: Insecta
- Order: Hymenoptera
- Family: Pompilidae
- Genus: Anoplius
- Species: A. atrox

Binomial name
- Anoplius atrox (Dahlbom, 1843)

= Anoplius atrox =

Species of wasp

Anoplius atrox is a species of spider wasp in the family Pompilidae.
