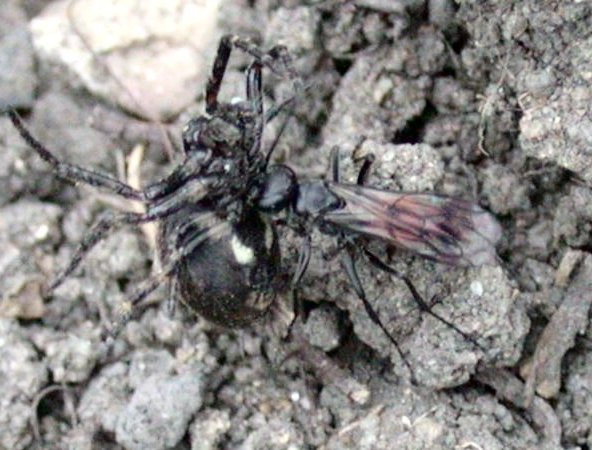
- Anoplius viaticus (L.) (Hymenoptera: Pompilidae) with prey Nuctenea umbratica (Clerck) (Arachnida: Araneidae)
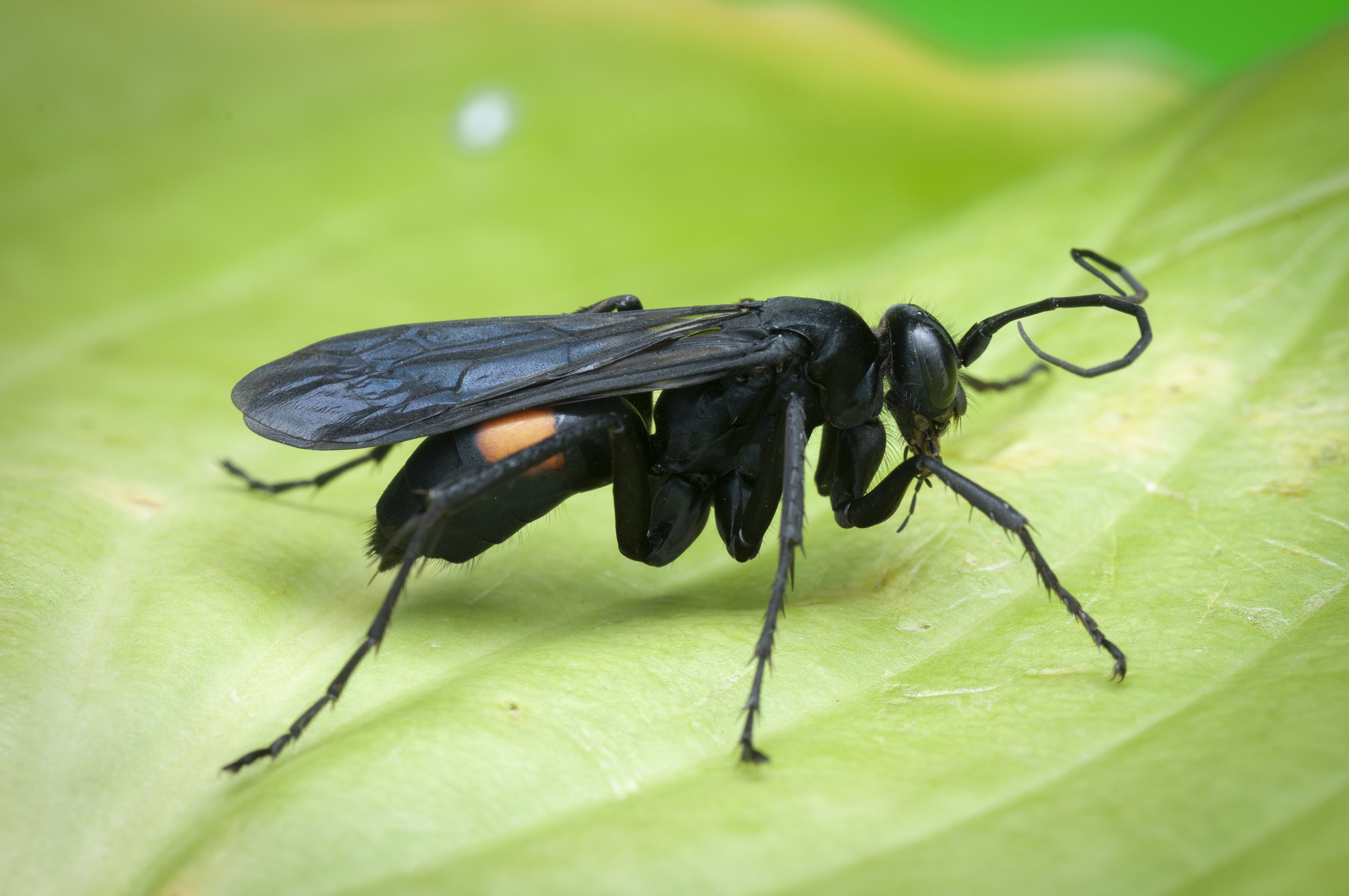
- Anoplius samariensis, Adult, South Korea

Scientific classification
- Kingdom: Animalia
- Phylum: Arthropoda
- Clade: Pancrustacea
- Class: Insecta
- Order: Hymenoptera
- Family: Pompilidae
- Genus: Anoplius; Dufour, 1834

Type species
- Sphex nigerrmius Scopoli, 1763

= Anoplius =

Genus of wasps

Anoplius is a genus of spider wasps in the family Pompilidae called the blue-black spider wasps. It is one of two genera within the tribe Anopliini of subfamily Pompilinae.

== Species ==
The genus includes the following species:

=== Subgenus Anoplius (Anopliodes) ===
- Anoplius bolli Banks, 1917
- Anoplius chiriqui Evans, 1966
- Anoplius parsonsi (Banks, 1944)
- Anoplius varius (Fabricius, 1804)
- Anoplius vestoris Banks, 1947

=== Subgenus Anoplius (Anoplius) ===
- Anoplius aberrans Gussakovskij, 1932
- Anoplius alpinobalticus Wolf, 1965
- Anoplius ambatoensis (Cameron, 1903)
- Anoplius angustus Banks, 1947
- Anoplius apicalis (Haupt, 1938)
- Anoplius araucanus (Herbst, 1928)
- Anoplius basalis Dreisbach, 1950
- Anoplius caviventris (Aurivillius, 1907)
- Anoplius concinnus (Dahlbom, 1845)
- Anoplius davisi Banks, 1947
- Anoplius depressipes Banks, 1919
- Anoplius dreisbachi Evans, 1966
- Anoplius elongatus Dreisbach, 1950
- Anoplius eous Yasumatsu, 1936
- Anoplius fratellus (Pérez, 1905)
- Anoplius fulgidus (Robertson, 1901)
- Anoplius hispidulus Dreisbach, 1950
- Anoplius hummeli (Haupt, 1934)
- Anoplius illinoensis (Cresson, 1865)
- Anoplius imbellis Banks, 1944
- Anoplius iriomotensis Tsuneki, 1990
- Anoplius ishigakianus Tsuneki, 1990
- Anoplius ithaca (Banks, 1912)
- Anoplius iwatai Yasumatsu, 1939
- Anoplius japonicus Yasumatsu, 1943
- Anoplius liukiu (Dalla Torre, 1897)
- Anoplius machachiensis (Cameron, 1903)
- Anoplius minor Banks, 1947
- Anoplius niger (Haupt, 1938)
- Anoplius nigerrimus (Scopoli, 1763)
- Anoplius obscuratus (Haupt, 1938)
- Anoplius pacificus Yasumatsu, 1943
- Anoplius pannonicus Wolf, 1965
- Anoplius papago Banks, 1941
- Anoplius perpilosus Banks, 1947
- Anoplius petiolaris Gussakovskij, 1932
- Anoplius piliventris (Morawitz, 1889)
- Anoplius ryukyuensis Tsuneki, 1990
- Anoplius sachalinensis Lelej, 1994
- Anoplius sakishimanus Tsuneki, 1990
- Anoplius simulans (Cresson, 1869)
- Anoplius sundukovi Loktionov & Lelej, 2014
- Anoplius surusumi Tsuneki, 1989
- Anoplius tanoi Tsuneki, 1990
- Anoplius tenuicornis (Tournier, 1889)
- Anoplius toluca (Cameron, 1893)
- Anoplius toyohei Loktionov & Lelej, 2014
- Anoplius varunus Banks, 1947
- Anoplius ventralis (Banks, 1910)
- Anoplius virginiensis (Cresson, 1867)

=== Subgenus Anoplius (Arachnophroctonus) ===
- Anoplius acapulcoensis (Cameron, 1893)
- Anoplius aeruginosus (Tournier, 1890)
- Anoplius alcataria (Banks, 1947)
- Anoplius allorices (Banks, 1947)
- Anoplius americanus (Beauvois, 1811)
- Anoplius apiculatus (Smith, 1855)
- Anoplius arequipensis (Brèthes, 1924)
- Anoplius argelesia (Banks, 1947)
- Anoplius argenteomaculata (Fox, 1897)
- Anoplius atrimene (Banks, 1947)
- Anoplius bilunata (Haliday, 1836)
- Anoplius boliviana (Banks, 1947)
- Anoplius caloderes (Banks, 1945)
- Anoplius chiapanus Evans, 1966
- Anoplius clotho (Smith, 1879)
- Anoplius cuautemoc Evans, 1966
- Anoplius cymocles (Banks, 1947)
- Anoplius cynthia (Banks, 1947)
- Anoplius decepta (Fox, 1897)
- Anoplius echinatus (Fox, 1897)
- Anoplius emortua Banks, 1947
- Anoplius euacantha Banks, 1947
- Anoplius hermanni (Holmberg, 1904)
- Anoplius hispaniolae Evans, 1966
- Anoplius holmbergi (Banks, 1947)
- Anoplius inaurata (Smith, 1879)
- Anoplius inculcatrix (Cameron, 1912)
- Anoplius infuscatus (Vander, Linden, 1827)
- Anoplius marginalis (Banks, 1910)
- Anoplius marginicollis (Taschenberg, 1869)
- Anoplius moestus (Banks, 1912)
- Anoplius nigritus (Dahlbom, 1843)
- Anoplius occidentalis (Dreisbach, 1954)
- Anoplius ornamenta (Fox, 1897)
- Anoplius partita (Fox, 1897)
- Anoplius personata (Fox, 1897)
- Anoplius peruviana (Banks, 1947)
- Anoplius platensis (Brèthes, 1909)
- Anoplius pulchrisoma (Banks, 1947)
- Anoplius relativus (Fox, 1893)
- Anoplius scalaris (Taschenberg, 1869)
- Anoplius semicinctus (Dahlbom, 1843)
- Anoplius semirufus (Cresson, 1867)
- Anoplius separata (Taschenberg, 1869)
- Anoplius sobrinus (Spinola, 1851)
- Anoplius spinimanus (Eschscholtz, 1823)
- Anoplius spinolae (Kohl, 1905)
- Anoplius taschenbergi (Brèthes)
- Anoplius triqueta (Fox, 1897)
- Anoplius turcica (Fabricius, 1775)
- Anoplius veranes (Banks, 1947)
- Anoplius viaticus (Linnaeus, 1758)
- Anoplius virilis (Banks, 1947)
- Anoplius xerophilus Evans, 1947

=== Subgenus Anoplius (Dicranoplius) ===
- Anoplius albidus (Evans, 1969)
- Anoplius areatus (Taschenberg, 1869)
- Anoplius brevitarsus (Banks, 1947)
- Anoplius cujanus (Holmberg, 1881)
- Anoplius diphonichus (Spinola, 1851)
- Anoplius evansi Pitts & Sadler, 2017
- Anoplius nigritus (Evans, 1969) — preoccupied by Anoplius (Ar.) nigritus Dahlbom, 1843
- Anoplius pampero (Evans, 1969)
- Anoplius satanus (Holmberg, 1881)

=== Subgenus Anoplius (Notiochares) ===
- Anoplius amethystinus (Dahlbom, 1834)
- Anoplius diffinis Banks, 1947
- Anoplius lepidus (Say, 1836)

=== Subgenus Anoplius (Onentanophus) ===
- Anoplius bifasciatus Tullgren, 1904
- Anoplius canifrons (Smith, 1855)
- Anoplius morosus Smith, 1855
- Anoplius nigripes (Haupt, 1950)
- Anoplius nozakae Tsuneki, 1990
- Anoplius rufipes Day, 1974
- Anoplius saegeri Arnold, 1937
- Anoplius yonagunianus Tsuneki, 1990

=== Subgenus Anoplius (Pompilinus) ===
- Anoplius brevihirta (Banks, 1945)
- Anoplius californiae Evans, 1948
- Anoplius clystera (Banks, 1914)
- Anoplius cylindricus (Cresson, 1867)
- Anoplius estellina (Banks, 1914)
- Anoplius fraternus (Banks, 1941)
- Anoplius insolens (Banks, 1912)
- Anoplius krombeini Evans, 1950
- Anoplius leona (Cameron, 1893)
- Anoplius marginatus (Say, 1824)
- Anoplius percitus Evans, 1950
- Anoplius rectangularis (Dreisbach, 1949)
- Anoplius splendens (Dreisbach, 1949)
- Anoplius stenotus (Banks, 1914)
- Anoplius subcylindricus (Banks, 1917)
- Anoplius tenebrosus (Cresson, 1865)
- Anoplius texanus (Dreisbach, 1949)
- Anoplius townesi Evans, 1951

=== Species transferred to Lophopompilus ===
The former subgenus Lophopompilus has been elevated to a separate genus by Loktionov and Lelej.

- Lophopompilus aethiops (Cresson, 1865)
- Lophopompilus atrox (Dahlbom, 1843)
- Lophopompilus bengtssoni (Regan, 1923)
- Lophopompilus carolina (Banks, 1921)
- Lophopompilus cleora (Banks, 1917)
- Lophopompilus grandis (Eversmann, 1846)
- Lophopompilus samariensis (Pallas, 1771) — species studied for its venom Pompilidotoxin

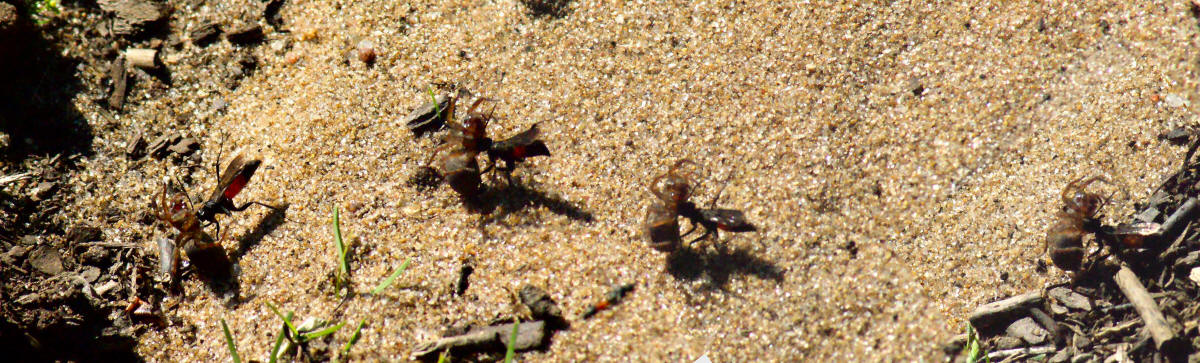
Anoplius infuscatus dragging spider
