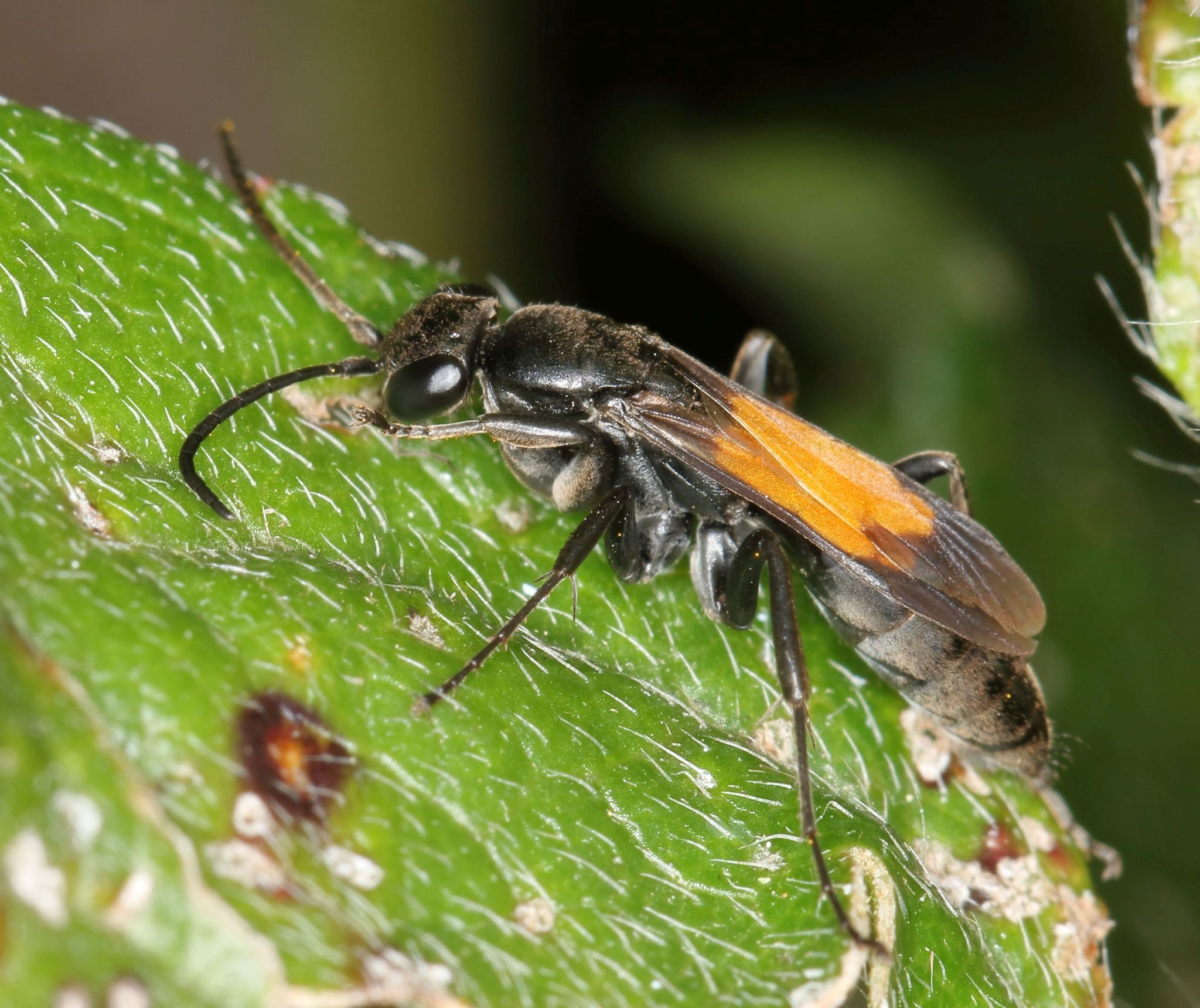
- Unidentified Ctenocerinae from South Africa

Scientific classification
- Kingdom: Animalia
- Phylum: Arthropoda
- Class: Insecta
- Order: Hymenoptera
- Family: Pompilidae
- Subfamily: Ctenocerinae; Arnold, 1934

= Ctenocerinae =

Subfamily of wasps

The Ctenocerinae are a subfamily of spider wasps, Pompilidae, which contains a small number of genera, two in the Neotropics, four in Australia and the remainder in Africa. Ctenocerine wasps have evidently evolved from a common ancestor with the Pepsinae, but are specialized for preying upon trap-door spiders (Ctenizidae).

== Genera ==
The following 26 genera are in the subfamily Ctenocerinae:

- Apinaspis Banks, 1938
- Apoclavelia Evans, 1972
- Apteropompilus Brauns, 1899
- Apteropompiloides Brauns, 1899
- Arnoldatus Pate, 1946
- Ateloclavelia Arnold, 1932
- Austroclavelia Evans, 1972
- Clavelia Lucas, 1851
- Claveliella Arnold, 1939
- Cteniziphontes Evans, 1972
- Ctenocerus Dahlbom, 1845
- Evansiclavelia Pitts, Rodriguez & Shimizu, 2021
- Hadropompilus Arnold, 1934
- Marimba Pate, 1946
- Masisia Arnold, 1934
- Maurillus Smith, 1855
- Maurilloides Pitts & Shimizu, 2021
- Paraclavelia Haupt, 1930
- Parapompilus Smith, 1855
- Parapsilotelus Arnold, 1960
- Pezopompilus Arnold, 1946
- Pseudopedinaspis Brauns, 1906
- Psilotelus Arnold, 1932
- Spathomelus Wahis, 2013
- Teinotrachelus Arnold, 1935
- Trichosalius Arnold, 1934
