= Pompilidotoxin =

Beta-Pompilidotoxin

Clinical data
- Other names: B-Pompilidotoxin, PMTX

Pharmacokinetic data
- Metabolism: Liver and other proteases
- Excretion: Kidney and intestines

Identifiers
- IUPAC name: (3S)-3-[[(2S)-2-[[(2S)-2-[[2-[[(2S,3S)-2-[[(2S)-6-amino-2-[[(2S,3S)-2-[[(2S)-2-amino-5-(diaminomethylideneamino)pentanoyl]amino]-3-methylpentanoyl]amino]hexanoyl]amino]-3-methylpentanoyl]amino]acetyl]amino]-4-methylpentanoyl]amino]-3-phenylpropanoyl]amino]-4-[[(2S)-5-amino-1-[[(2S)-1-[[(2S)-1-[[(2S)-1-[[(2S)-1-amino-4-methyl-1-oxopentan-2-yl]amino]-5-(diaminomethylideneamino)-1-oxopentan-2-yl]amino]-3-hydroxy-1-oxopropan-2-yl]amino]-4-methyl-1-oxopentan-2-yl]amino]-1,5-dioxopentan-2-yl]amino]-4-oxobutanoic acid
- CAS Number: 216064-36-7
- PubChem CID: 90479801

Chemical and physical data
- Formula: C_{71}H_{124}N_{22}O_{17}
- Molar mass: 1557.910 g·mol^{−1}
- 3D model (JSmol): Interactive image
- Solubility in water: ≥22.05 mg/mL (20 °C)
- SMILES: CCC(C)C(C(=O)NC(CCCCN)C(=O)NC(C(C)CC)C(=O)NCC(=O)NC(CC(C)C)C(=O)NC(CC1=CC=CC=C1)C(=O)NC(CC(=O)O)C(=O)NC(CCC(=O)N)C(=O)NC(CC(C)C)C(=O)NC(CO)C(=O)NC(CCCN=C(N)N)C(=O)NC(CC(C)C)C(=O)N)NC(=O)C(CCCN=C(N)N)N
- InChI: InChI=1S/C71H124N22O17/c1-11-40(9)56(93-62(103)44(23-16-17-27-72)86-69(110)57(41(10)12-2)92-59(100)43(73)22-18-28-80-70(76)77)68(109)82-35-54(96)83-48(31-38(5)6)63(104)89-50(33-42-20-14-13-15-21-42)65(106)90-51(34-55(97)98)66(107)85-46(25-26-53(74)95)61(102)88-49(32-39(7)8)64(105)91-52(36-94)67(108)84-45(24-19-29-81-71(78)79)60(101)87-47(58(75)99)30-37(3)4/h13-15,20-21,37-41,43-52,56-57,94H,11-12,16-19,22-36,72-73H2,1-10H3,(H2,74,95)(H2,75,99)(H,82,109)(H,83,96)(H,84,108)(H,85,107)(H,86,110)(H,87,101)(H,88,102)(H,89,104)(H,90,106)(H,91,105)(H,92,100)(H,93,103)(H,97,98)(H4,76,77,80)(H4,78,79,81)/t40-,41-,43-,44-,45-,46-,47-,48-,49-,50-,51-,52-,56-,57-/m0/s1; Key:YBOJYGJMKPMNRC-QRIWDNSUSA-N

Pompilidotoxins (PMTXs) are toxic substances that can only be found in the venom of several solitary wasps. This kind of wasp uses their venom to offensively capture prey and is relatively harmless to humans. This is in stark contrast to social insects that defend themselves and their colonies with their venom.

The pompilidotoxin producing wasps are part of the Pompilinae subfamily which consists of fifty known genus groups of which only two groups are known to produce the toxin. Both groups produce different variants.

The first notice of a pompilidotoxin variant was made by Konno et.al in 1997 after a survey was conducted of neurotoxins in solitary wasps that inhabit Japan. He purified and synthesised this toxin, now called α-pompilidotoxin from the solitary spider wasp (Anoplius samariensis). The second, closely related variant, β-pompilidotoxin, was found by Konno et.al. a year later in 1998 in another solitary wasp (Batozonellus maculifrons) In this year Konno et.al. also shed concrete light on the structure and function of these toxins.

Anoplius samariensis is known to live distributed over the globe with reported cases in east-Asia, east and central Europe, and Russia. It produces the α-PMTX to act upon the nervous system of a stung victim. This way they can paralyse a wide range of spiders that will then be dragged to the wasp's nest that is located in the ground, in a cavity of a plant stem, or made from mud. The spider wasp lays its eggs on paralysed spiders so that the hatching larvae can feed on living prey.

In addition to hunting spiders, Batozonellus maculifrons wasps also hunt a large variety of insects. The animals within this genus use both the α-PMTX and β-PMTX. As of date, the wasp has only been reported in China and Japan.

== Structure and reactivity ==
The structure of α-PMTX consists of 13 amino acid residues with the sequence Arg-Ile-Lys-Ile-Gly-Leu-Phe-Asp-Gln-Leu-Ser-Lys-Leu-NH_{2}. Replacement of the lysine residue at position 12 of α-PMTX with arginine results in β-PMTX. This single amino acid difference appears to be responsible for a difference in potency, as β-PMTX appeared to be five times as potent as α-PMTX in lobster neuromuscular junctions. The location of the three basic residues at positions 1, 3 and 12 was found to be crucial for toxin action. The length of the compound also appeared to be crucial for its function.

Analogues of α- and β-PMTX have been synthesized by implementing changes in the amino acid sequence to understand the structure-activity relationship (SAR) with respect to activity for human voltage-gated sodium channel 1.1 (hNa_{V}1.1) and selectivity over other isoforms of human Na^{+} channels such as hNa_{V}1.2-1.7. 3D models have suggested that β-PMTX may adopt a kinked conformation assisted by its Gly-5 residue and is further stabilised by electrostatic interaction between its negatively charged Asp-8 and positively charged residues Arg-1 and/or Lys-3. This led to the hypothesis that a β-turn-like conformation depending on Gly-5, since it is the most sterically flexible amino acid, could be an important feature of the pharmacologically active conformation. This was tested by replacing Gly-5 with other (β-)turn-favouring residues, but this change was not tolerated. By interchanging the Arg-1, Lys-3, and Asp-8 residues to see if their positions are essential for sodium channel binding or formation of the secondary structure, inactive peptides were obtained which proposes that correct positioning of these residues is critical for activity. The introduction of disulfide bonds in the kink structure to make it less flexible also led to inactive peptides as they appeared to be very sensitive to structural changes.

However, a peptide where Lys-3 was replaced with a more basic Arg residue showed better activity. This was designed based on observations that some of the acidic residues in the neuronal sodium channels are important for binding and that removal of basic residue Lys-3 from α-PMTX was not tolerated, while removal of acidic residue Asp-8 was. By combining K3R (lysine-3 to arginine) and S11L (serine-11 to leucine) mutations, a higher activity could also be obtained.

Lipophilic residues in other toxins that block sodium channels have been assumed to be important for binding at site 3 of neuronal sodium channels. Additionally, it was found that replacing Phe-7 of β-PMTX with more lipophilic amino non-natural amino acids such as 1-Nal and 2-Nal resulted in a boost in activity, while replacement with a polar residue led to a complete loss of activity. This suggests an essential role of the endogenous Phe-7 residue in mediating the interaction between the venom toxin and the sodium channel.

Even though PMTX has no structural homology with other toxins acting on sodium channels, such as sea anemone toxins or scorpion toxins, some parts of these toxins show similar structures to interact with the receptor site of the sodium channels.

== Synthesis ==
Although Pompilidotoxins can be extracted from the venom of solitary wasps, where they are made via standard protein synthesis pathways, they can also be obtained via synthetic routes such as a stepwise solid-phase addition method using Fmoc chemistry.

== Mechanism of action ==
After the venom has entered the body via the wasp sting, it enters the bloodstream, where it will be diluted in the blood and distributed through the organism. Pompilidotoxins target the sodium channels, so the toxin reaches its target sites via the distribution by the bloodstream.

Research by Sahara et.al. (2000) has suggested that α-PMTX might slow or block the conformational changes that are necessary for the fast inactivation of voltage gated sodium channels. This causes the intracellular sodium concentration to increase. They hypothesise that this effect could be caused by the α-PMTX binding to similar elements of the neurotoxin receptor site 3 on the extracellular surface of the sodium channel. α-PMTX also enhances both the inhibitory postsynaptic potentials (IPSPs) and the excitatory postsynaptic potentials (EPSPs). The eventual paralysis of the spider is caused by the prolonged membrane depolarization, which is induced by the EPSPs.

However, when the fast inactivation is slowed or blocked by channel blocker like PMTX, the membrane will not repolarize properly, but stay in a depolarized state instead. The long-lasting depolarisation leads to paralysis.

A study by Konno et.al. (2001) has found that the positively charged amino acids in β-PMTX likely bind to the Glu-1616 site on the D4S3-S4 loop of the sodium channel. This indicates that the positive charges of PMTXs are a crucial part of the toxins, as they are likely involved in the electrostatic bonding between the toxin and the sodium channel.

Pompilidotoxins discriminate between neuronal and cardiac sodium channels, in that they only bind to neuronal sodium channels.

== Efficacy and side effects ==
Counterintuitively to the drastic effect of thinly winged insect-venom on neurological processes, some toxins of these hymenopteran insects are used in the field of medicine. An example can be found in tertiapin-Q from the European honey bee (Apis mellifera) which is used in the treatment of pain, multiple sclerosis (MS), and rheumatoid arthritis.

The spider wasp is also a hymenopteran insect but its pompilidotoxins are currently not linked to any existing drugs. Therefore there are also no indications for these compounds. PMTXs medical potential has been considered in the past but to no avail. Their possible characteristic to only enhance neuronal activity has already been nullified as early as in 1998 by Harsch et.al who experimentally found that α-PMTX could also disrupt the activity of rat cortical neurons irreversibly and immediately upon administration. The unpredictability of the toxin and the still rather large gap in information on the toxin, contribute to it not having been translated into medicine.

However, even though pompilidotoxins are not used as drugs, they do hold a large medical value. This value comes forth from the fact that this neurotoxin of 13 amino acids is so much smaller than its fellow sodium channel-specific polypeptide toxins. For example, pompilidotoxins are much smaller than the conventionally studied sea anemone toxin that has 46 to 49 amino acids, or the α-scorpion toxin of even 60 to 65 residues. The short length of pompilidotoxins implies that the crucial amino acid for receptor binding would be easier to detect in studies based on pompilidotoxins.

Additionally, the binding of the α-scorpion or sea anemone toxin to the sodium receptor also includes a complex system of forming three to four additional disulfide bonds. Pompilidotoxins cannot form such bonds. Pompilidotoxins thus provide a special advantage to research, classify, and characterise different isoforms of sodium channels due to their concise and simple structure. They have already been used for neuronal research into the action mechanisms of sodium channels, and the characterisation of receptor functions.

Knowing more about the working of sodium channels could greatly contribute to healthcare as sodium channel alterations are associated with a large range of neurological disorders. Persistent sodium currents are especially participating in some variants of epilepsy and MS. Moreover, β-PMTX itself has been associated with being an epilepsy-inducing agent due to its drastic working in increasing neuronal excitability and has been recognized as being especially important for providing insights into the role of sodium currents in epileptogenesis.

Thus, even though pompilidotoxins are not used as drugs and therefore have no efficacious nor adverse effects, they are medically valuable as a research model to indirectly improve patient well-being.

== Toxicity ==
The Pompilidae family of spider wasps is known for its powerful and painful sting that is used to paralyse arachnids. Social wasps readily attack any threat to their queen and colony and are the only type of insects responsible for medically significant incidents with humans. However, PMTXs are produced by solitary spider wasps and since solitary wasps do not have a colony to defend, humans normally will not be stung by these wasps.

PMTX is not listed by IARC, which suggests that there is no indication of carcinogenicity for humans, other information about the effects of PMTX on humans is currently not available. However, it is thought that it won't have a big impact on humans due to the difference in neurological setup between humans and arachnids. What is known is that being stung by a spider wasp causes local pain and swelling, and some people might have an allergic reaction to the sting which can be dangerous. The symptoms of a spider wasp sting, apart from the allergic reaction, can be treated with a cold compress.

Even though humans usually will not be stung by these wasps, there have been scientists that deliberately extensively provoked spider wasps similar to PMTX-producing spider wasps, to have them stung by these animals for research on the pain inflicted by these insects. Because of these individuals, it is known that though spider wasp venom causes paralysis in their arthropod prey, they inflict intense pain that remains for around five minutes onto vertebrates such as humans. Entomologist Justin Schmidt created a sting pain index where the Tarantula hawk spider wasp is described as "Blinding, fierce, shockingly electric. A running hair dryer has just been dropped into your bubble bath". Dr Sam Robinson had himself stung by the Australian spider-hunting wasp and described the experience as "authoritative, gripping and shockingly powerful".

Though both insects are related to the PMTXs producing spider wasps, there are no recorded cases of the experience of having Anoplius samariensis or Batozonellus maculifrons administer their PMTXs-containing venom to humans. The pain arises after the venom is introduced into the skin and enzymes have degraded the surrounding tissue. Several immune cells such as mast cells and basophils are then activated and release histamine to cause widening of the veins and the immune response that causes the pain and gives rise to increased warmth as well as the swelling and reddening of the skin that is characteristic for insect stings.

== Effects on animals ==
The biological activity in animals of PMTX was first tested on lobsters by administering it to the neuromuscular synapse in the legs. 10mM of α-PMXT and β-PMXT each was administered, and both toxins enhanced the excitatory postsynaptic potentials (EPSPs). Enhancement of the EPSPs generates oscillatory spike responses and results in longer and larger depolarisations of the muscle membrane which will cause muscle contraction. The β-PMXT is proven to be 5 times more potent than the α-PMXT.

The effect of β-PMXT on rat hippocampal CA1 interneurons is proven to be sodium channel modulation, this modulation is due to the toxin slowing the inactivation process of the sodium channels. It is also seen that the effect of the PMTX differs between different cell types, this can be explained by the different distribution of voltage-gated sodium channels in the cell types.

In 2016 Konno et.al. experimented with the effect of pompilidotoxins on one insect and seven mammalian voltage-gated sodium channels. From the mammalian sodium channels the Nav1.6 channel gave the most potent effect which indicates that the toxin is selective for this channel. The channel of the insect that was tested for the toxin gave an even greater effect, which is quite logical since the spider wasps target arthropods.

The toxin has not yet been tested on arachnids, though it is known that pompilidotoxins are used by spider wasps to paralyse arachnids. The voltage-gated sodium channels of arachnids are quite similar to those of insects, so based on the effect pompilidotoxins have on insect sodium channels, it is thought that the toxin will also slow the inactivation of those of arachnids. This slow inactivation could affect the locomotion of arachnids that they need to attack by disrupting the synchronised firing of neurons.
