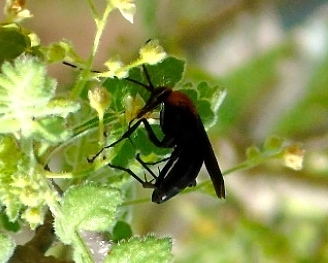
- Notocyphus dorsalis

Scientific classification
- Kingdom: Animalia
- Phylum: Arthropoda
- Clade: Pancrustacea
- Class: Insecta
- Order: Hymenoptera
- Family: Pompilidae
- Subfamily: Notocyphinae
- Genus: Notocyphus; Smith, 1855

Type species
- Notocyphus saevissimus Smith, 1855

= Notocyphus =

Genus of spider wasps

Notocyphus is a genus of spider wasps, belonging to the family Pompilidae. They are the only genus in the monotypic subfamily Notocyphinae. These wasps are found in the Nearctic and the Neotropics.

== Species ==
The following species are included in the genus Notocyphus:

- Notocyphus abdominalis Lucas, 1897
- Notocyphus abnormis (Taschenberg, 1869)
- Notocyphus adoletis Banks, 1945
- Notocyphus albopictus Smith, 1862
- Notocyphus alboplagiatus (F.Smith)
- Notocyphus anacaona Rodriguez & Pitts, 2012
- Notocyphus apicalis Cameron, 1893
- Notocyphus atratus Banks, 1947
- Notocyphus aurantiicornis Lucas, 1897
- Notocyphus bicolor Lucas, 1897
- Notocyphus bimaculatus Lucas, 1897
- Notocyphus bipartitus Banks, 1947
- Notocyphus brevicornis Fox, 1897
- Notocyphus chiriquensis Cameron, 1893
- Notocyphus compressiventris (Cresson, 1865)
- Notocyphus conspicua (Smith, 1873)
- Notocyphus crassicornis (Smith, 1864)
- Notocyphus deceptus Banks, 1947
- Notocyphus dolorosus Banks, 1947
- Notocyphus dorsalis Cresson, 1872
- Notocyphus dubius Fox, 1897
- Notocyphus erythronotus Lucas, 1897
- Notocyphus femoratus Lucas, 1897
- Notocyphus ferrugineus Fox, 1897
- Notocyphus fraternus Banks, 1947
- Notocyphus fulvus Lucas, 1897
- Notocyphus fumipennis (Cameron, 1891)
- Notocyphus fuscus Lucas, 1897
- Notocyphus griseus Lucas, 1897
- Notocyphus inornatus Banks, 1947
- Notocyphus joergenseni Brèthes, 1909
- Notocyphus laetabilis (Smith, 1873)
- Notocyphus lucasi Banks, 1945
- Notocyphus lugubris (Smith, 1873)
- Notocyphus lunulatus Lucas, 1897
- Notocyphus luteipennis Lucas, 1897
- Notocyphus macrostoma Kohl, 1886
- Notocyphus maculifrons Smith, 1873
- Notocyphus melanosoma Kohl, 1886
- Notocyphus minimus Lucas, 1897
- Notocyphus morosus Banks, 1947
- Notocyphus multipicta (Smith, 1873)
- Notocyphus nessus Banks, 1945
- Notocyphus nigrinus Banks, 1947
- Notocyphus nubilipennis Fox, 1897
- Notocyphus obscuripennis Fox, 1897
- Notocyphus octomaculatus Arnold, 1951
- Notocyphus ordinaria (Smith, 1873)
- Notocyphus ornatus Banks, 1947
- Notocyphus pallidipennis Banks, 1947
- Notocyphus pictipennis Fox, 1897
- Notocyphus plagiatus Smith, 1862
- Notocyphus procris Banks, 1947
- Notocyphus rixosus Smith, 1855
- Notocyphus rubriventris Brèthes, 1909
- Notocyphus rufigaster Banks, 1945
- Notocyphus saevissimus Smith, 1855
- Notocyphus sericeus Banks, 1947
- Notocyphus sigmoides Banks, 1947
- Notocyphus signatus Banks, 1947
- Notocyphus similis Fox, 1897
- Notocyphus stahli Lucas, 1897
- Notocyphus terminatus Fox, 1897
- Notocyphus thetis Banks, 1945
- Notocyphus tyrannicus Smith, 1855
- Notocyphus unicinctus Brèthes, 1913
- Notocyphus variegatus Banks, 1947
- Notocyphus vindex Smith, 1864
- Notocyphus violaceipennis Cameron, 1893
- Notocyphus williamsi Banks, 1947
- Notocyphus xanthoproctus Lucas, 1897
