= Heinrich Wolf (entomologist) =

German entomologist

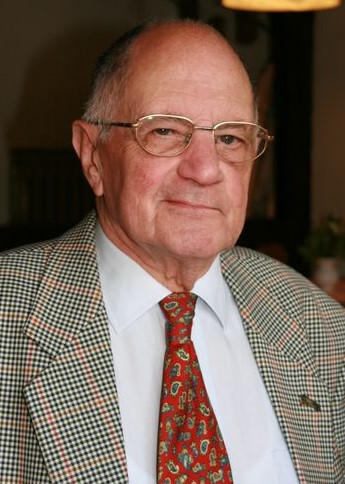
- Born: 26 April 1924; Siegen, North Rhine-Westphalia, Germany
- Died: 18 May 2020 (aged 96); Plettenberg, North Rhine-Westphalia, Germany
- Occupation: entomologist

Heinrich Wolf (26 April 1924 – 18 May 2020) was a German entomologist who specialised in Hymenoptera. His collection is conserved in the Castle Museum in Linz (Landesmuseum Linz).
