= Henri Tournier =

Swiss entomologist (1834–1904)

Henri Tournier (1834 – 27 August 1904) was a Swiss entomologist. He was a dealer in Peney, Satigny. Tournier described many new species of Hymenoptera and Coleoptera.

== Selected works ==
=== Coleoptera ===
- 1868 Description des Dascillides du bassin du Léman. 95 pp., 4 pls. Georg, Bale & Genève. F. Savy, Paris (Association Zoologique du Léman. Année 1867).
- 1874 Materiaux pour servir a la monographie de la tribu des Erirhinides de la famille des Curculionides (Coleopteres). Annales de la Societe Entomologique de Belgique, vol.17, no. I, pp. 63–116.

=== Hymenoptera ===
- 1889 Hymenoptéres, famille des Scolides: Monographie des espéces europeennes et des contres limitrophes du genre Tiphia Fabr. Ann. Soc. Entomol. Belg. 33: 1–35.
- 1889 Deux Hyménoptères nouveaux. Comptes rendus des Séances de la société entomologique de Belgique 33:23–24.
- 1889 Études Hyménoptèrologiques; de quelques Pompilides d'Europe et contrées limitrophes. L’Entomologiste Genevois. 1:133-140,154-178, 194–219.
- 1889 Hyménoptères. Descriptions d'espèces nouvelles et remarques diverses. L’Entomologiste Genevois 1: 11–18, 2: 35–45, 3: 56–69, 4: 93–96, 5: 102–115, 6-8:124–140.
- 1891 Descriptions d'espèces nouvelles L’Entomologiste Genevois. 1:194–219.
- 1895 Table synoptique des especes européennes et circa-européennes du genre Ferreola. Soc. Ent. France, Bull.:11–13.
