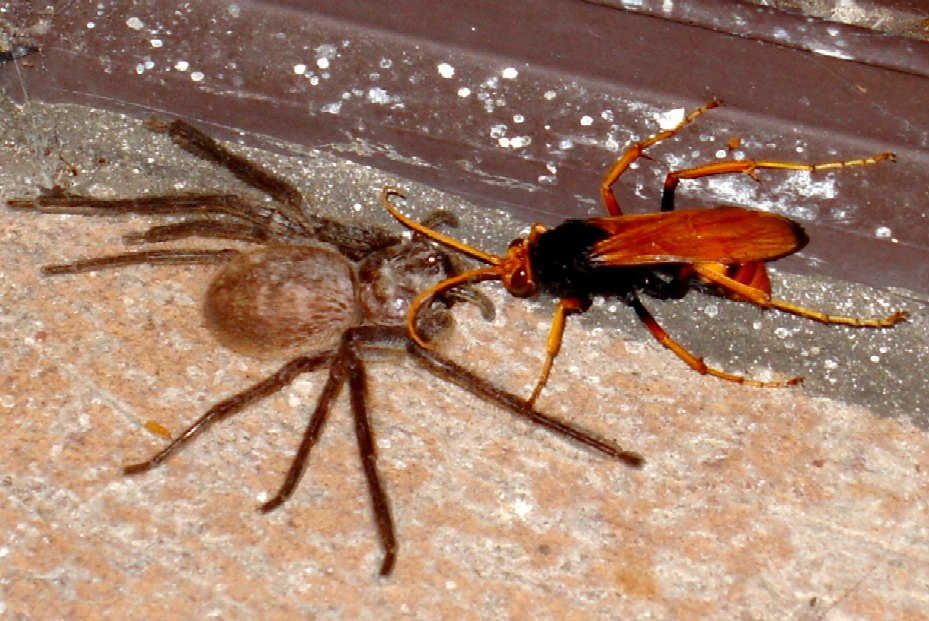
- Heterodontonyx bicolor captures a large huntsman spider in Western Australia

Scientific classification
- Kingdom: Animalia
- Phylum: Arthropoda
- Clade: Pancrustacea
- Class: Insecta
- Order: Hymenoptera
- Superfamily: Pompiloidea
- Family: Pompilidae; Latreille, 1804

Subfamilies
- see text

= Spider wasp =

Spider wasp Temporal range: Ypresian–Recent

Family of wasps

Pompilidae is a family of wasps commonly called spider wasps, spider-hunting wasps, or pompilid wasps. The family is cosmopolitan, with some 5,000 species in six subfamilies. With the exception of some group-nesting Ageniellini, the wasps are solitary. Most capture and paralyze prey, though members of the subfamily Ceropalinae are kleptoparasites of other pompilids, or ectoparasitoids of living spiders.

In South America, species may be referred to colloquially as marabunta or marimbondo, though these names can be generally applied to any very large stinging wasps. Furthermore, in some parts of Venezuela and Colombia, it is called matacaballos, or "horse killers", while in Brazil some particular bigger and brighter species of the general marimbondo kind might be called fecha-goela/cerra-goela, or "throat locker".

== Morphology ==
Like other strong fliers, pompilids have a thorax modified for efficient flight. The metathorax is solidly fused to the pronotum and mesothorax; moreover, the prothorax is best developed in Pompilidae and Scoliidae because wasps in these families use their forelegs to dig.

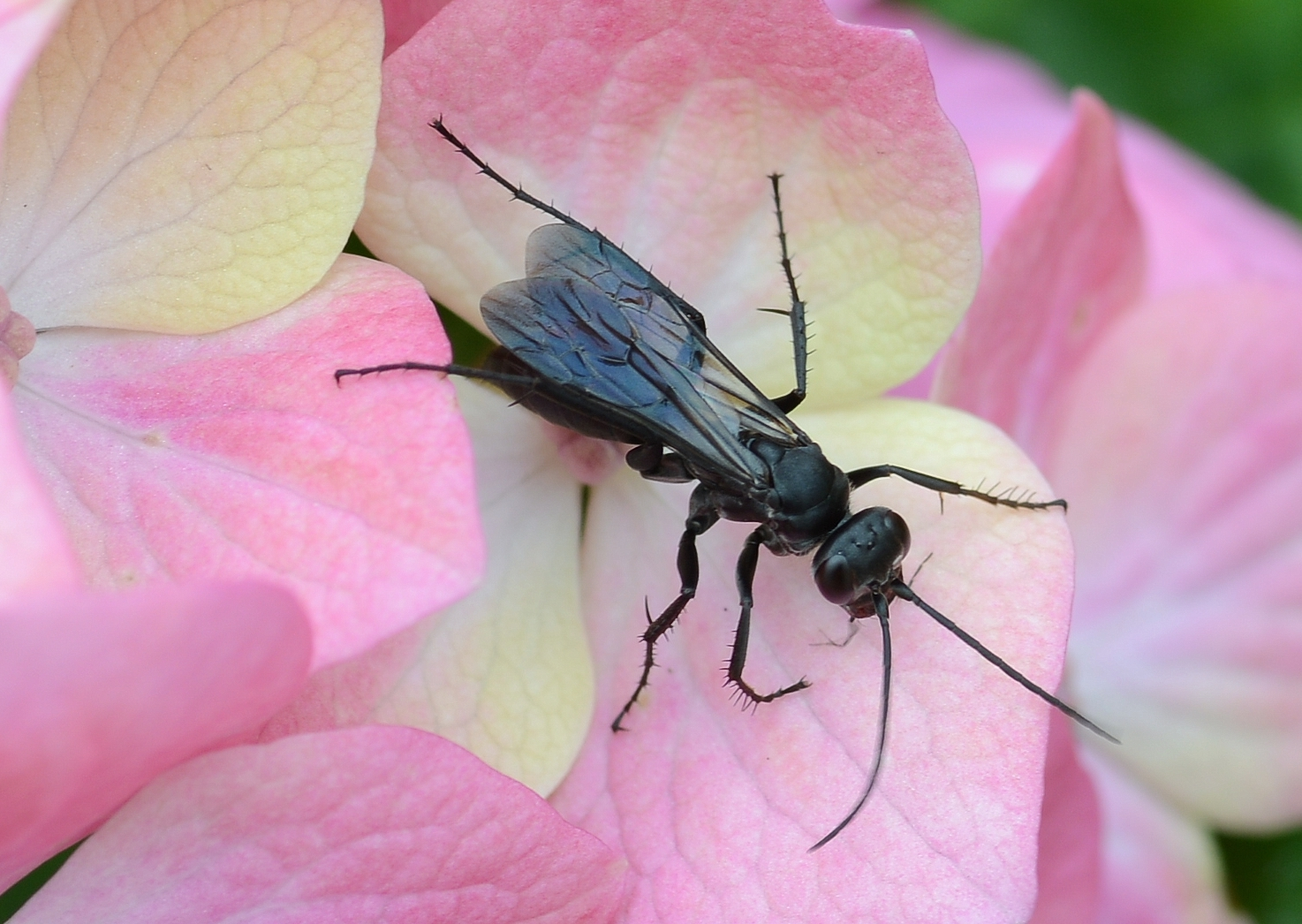
An unidentified spider wasp

Pompilids typically have long, spiny legs; the hind femur is often long enough to reach past the tip of the abdomen. The tibiae of the rear legs usually have a conspicuous spine at their distal end. The first two segments of the abdomen are narrow, giving the body a slender look. The pompilid body is typically dark (black or blue, sometimes with metallic reflections), but many brightly colored species exist. From a lateral view, its pronotum looks rectangular and it extends back to the tegulae, near the base of the wings. Most species are macropterous (having long wings), but a few brachypterous (short-winged) and apterous (no wings) species are known.

Spider wasps are best distinguished from vespoid wasps in having (in most species) a transverse groove bisecting the mesopleuron (the mesepisternal sclerite, a region on the side of middle segment of the thorax above the point where the legs join). They have antennae with 10 flagellomeres in females and 11 in males. Most Pompilidae have straight inner eye margins. The hind wings do not have a distinct claval lobe, but they have a distinctive jugal lobe. The hind leg has a tibial spur with a tuft or row of fine hairs. The legs are long and slender with the tips of the tibia (metatibia) long enough to extend beyond the tip of the abdomen (metasoma). Sexual dimorphism is not pronounced, although females are often larger than the males. Coloration and wing appearance vary greatly among the many species. General coloration is aposematic (warning off predators), generally based on black, often with markings of orange, red, yellow, or white. Larvae can also be identified by physical examination.

== Systematics ==
The Pompilidae have in the past been split into either four or six subfamilies. However, phylogenetic analyses based on morphological data have suggested that Notocyphinae is nested within the Pompilinae, while Epipompilinae is nested within the Ctenocerinae. This would leave four subfamilies as monophyletic clades, with Ceropalinae being sister to the other subfamilies, and Pepsinae being the sister clade to the Ctenocerinae and Pompilinae.

Analyses using four nuclear molecular markers have resurrected Notocyphinae as a subfamily, resulting in five subfamilies within Pompilidae. In this classification, Ctenocerinae are sister to the remaining lineages in the family; Pepsinae and Notocyphinae are sister taxa, as are Pepsinae and Pompilinae. They placed the genus Epipompilus in the Pepsinae.

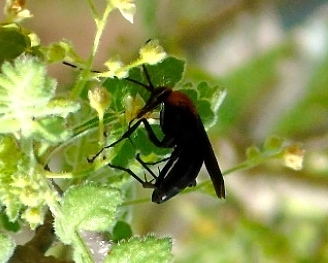
Notocyphus dorsalis

The subfamilies according to Waichert et al are:

- Ceropalinae, containing 2 genera, Ceropales and Irenangelus
- Notocyphinae, containing a single genus, Notocyphus, distributed in both the Nearctic and Neotropics
- Ctenocerinae, containing 26 genera, including 2 genera in the Neotropics, 4 in Australia and 11 in Africa
- Pepsinae, a diverse subfamily containing 84 genera, distributed worldwide except for Antarctica
- Pompilinae, a diverse subfamily containing 107 genera, distributed worldwide except for Antarctica

== Evolution ==
The oldest fossil currently known is an indeterminate fossil from the Early Eocene (Ypresian) Klondike Mountain Formation of Washington State, USA. Other fossil species are known from Dominican and Baltic ambers, the Florissant Formation and various other localities in Germany, France and Spain. Bryopompilus described from the mid Cretaceous Burmese amber was initially thought to belong to this family; however, it was subsequently placed in its own family, the Bryopompilidae.

== Ecology and behavior ==
Video of an unidentified spider wasp with prey (23s)

Unlike many other families in the Aculeata, essentially all wasps in this family are solitary (nests made by a single female).

Adult pompilids are nectar-feeding insects and feed on a variety of plants. Depending on genus and species, pompilids capture a variety of spiders for their larvae to feed on, covering nearly all free-living spider families, including tarantulas, wolf spiders (Lycosidae), huntsman spiders (Sparassidae), jumping spiders (Salticidae) and baboon spiders (Harpactirinae), though any given pompilid tends to attack only a limited diversity of spiders.

A female wasp searches the ground and/or vegetation for a spider, and upon finding one, stings it, paralyzing the spider. The targeted spider is typically unable to kill the wasp, because the wasp can just fly out of reach, so at best the spider fights fiercely to escape. Tarantula hawks (Pepsini) do not attack when adult tarantulas are close to or in their burrows. Instead, the wasps seek out adult males who have left their burrows in search of females to mate with. In the open the wasp first uses its wings to beat air over the tarantula, deceiving the tarantula into thinking that it is being targeted by a large bird so the tarantula reacts by curling up to appear smaller and less noticeable, which in turn makes the tarantula defenseless against the wasp's attack. However, Brazilian Wandering spiders (Phoneutria) and their predators have a different interaction dynamic, and the spiders often manage to defeat the hunting wasp.

Once the spider is paralyzed, a female pompilid digs a burrow or flies or drags the spider to a previously made burrow. Because of the large body size of their prey, tarantula hawks usually will either construct burrows near the site of attack or use the host's own burrow or tunnel. Pompilids typically provide each of their larvae with a single prey/host, which must be large enough to serve as its food source throughout its development. Typically, a single egg is laid on the abdomen of the spider, and the nest or burrow is closed so the larva can develop without disruption by other parasites or scavengers. The female wasp may then engage in spreading soil or other changes to the area, leaving the nest site inconspicuous. One species of spider wasp protects its nests by putting dead ants into the outermost chamber, where the ants' chemicals deter predators.

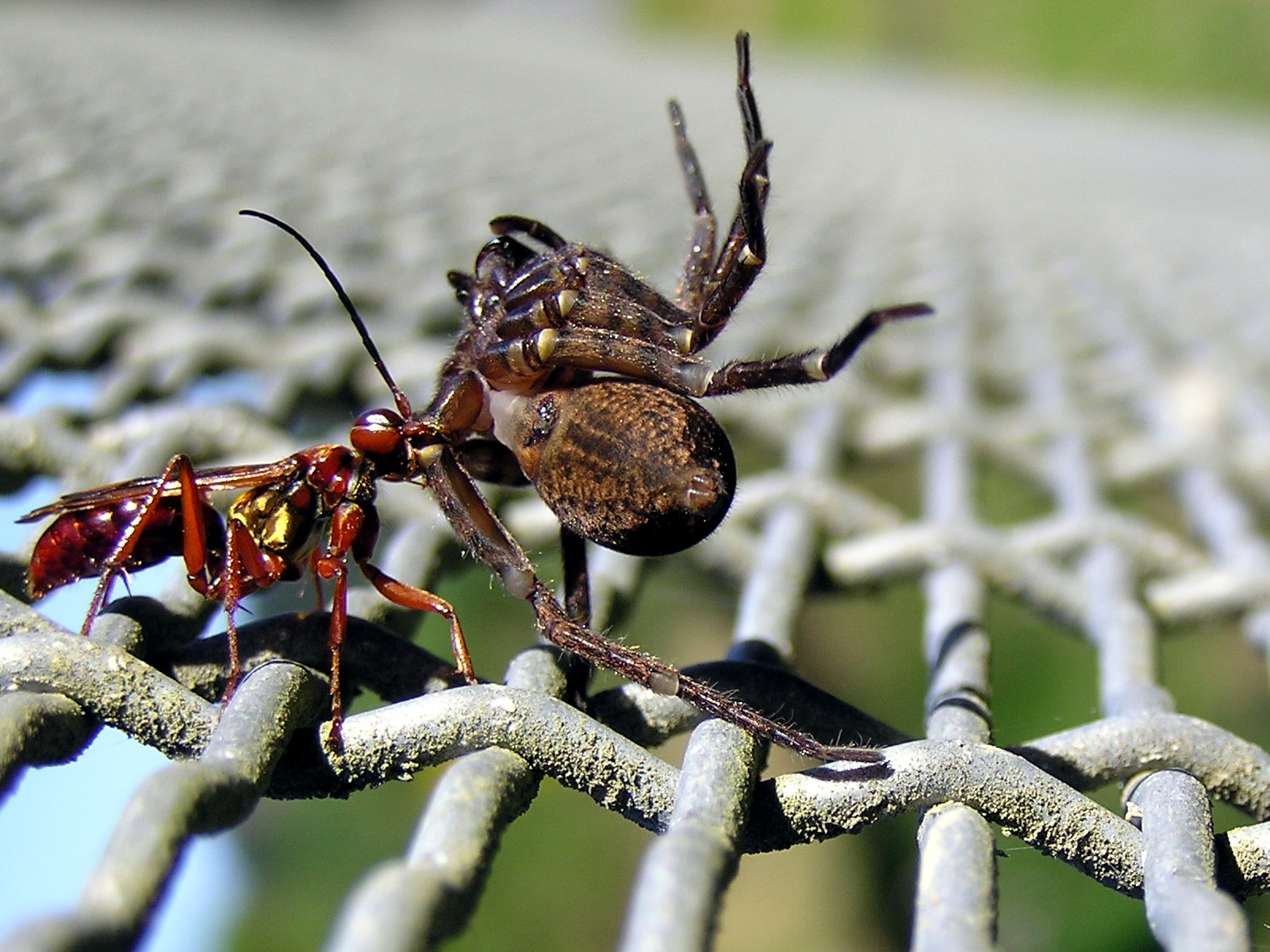
Sphictostethus nitidus dragging a spider to its nest

The egg hatches and the larva feeds on the spider, breaking through the integument with its mandibles. As the larva feeds on its host, it saves the vital organs, such as the heart and central nervous system, for last. By waiting until the final larval instar, it ensures the spider will not decompose before the larva has fully developed. The larva has five instar stages before it pupates; no major morphological differences are noted between the first four instars, with the exception of size. At the conclusion of the final instar, the larva spins a durable silk cocoon, and emerges as an adult either later in the same season or overwinters, depending on the species and the time of year the larva pupates. Some ceropalines lay their egg on a still-active spider, only temporarily paralyzing it, and the wasp larva feeds externally by extracting hemolymph after the egg hatches. In time, the spider will die, and the mature wasp larva will then pupate.

The size of the host can influence whether the wasp will lay a male or a female egg; larger prey often yield the (larger) females. Pepsis thisbe of the southwestern United States exhibits a direct correlation between adult wasp body length and the weight of its host spider, Aphonopelma echina. Because the size of a P. thisbe adult is determined by the size of the host provided for it by its mother, the seasonal frequency of host sizes implicitly will determine the size variation in adult wasps.

In another study on Pepsis thisbe, chemosensory cues were shown to be used to detect specific hosts. Specific chemosensory cues attract the wasp to its prey, Aphonopelma echina, despite other host spiders of the same size and frequency being present. In studies on Pepsis grossa (formerly P. formosa), a pompilid of the southwestern United States, the wasps were found to have behavioral plasticity. Their hunting behavior concerning their host Rhechostica echina improved with experience. The time required to complete all behavioral components decreased with each spider killed.

Concerning mating behavior, males acquire perch territories to scan for incoming receptive females. In studies on the tarantula wasp Hemipepsis ustulata, larger males are more likely to acquire perch territories and territorial males appear to increase their chances of mating because receptive females fly to perch sites held by said males.

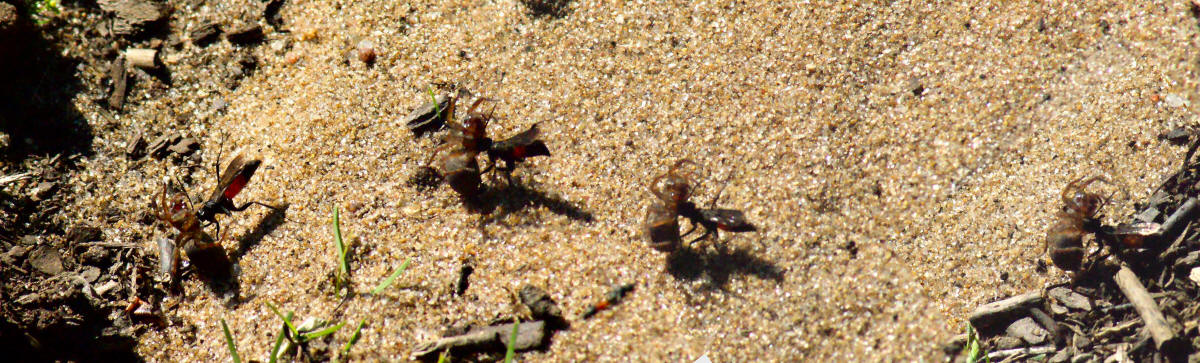
Anoplius sp. dragging a spider larger than herself backwards across a sandy heath (four stages are shown in the composite image)

== Sting ==
=== Toxins ===
The Pompilidae produce a venom, delivered when they sting, containing a variety of powerful neurotoxins named pompilidotoxin (PMTX). These inhibit the inactivation of voltage-gated sodium channels, causing too much sodium to flow through neuron cell membranes, causing long bursts of nerve impulses (action potentials), and thus overstimulating these nerves. Alpha- and beta-PMTX are both small peptide chains of just 13 amino acids; alpha-PMTX has been studied in Anoplius samariensis, while beta-PMTX has been studied in Batozonellus maculifrons.

=== Schmidt pain index ===
In 1984, Justin O. Schmidt developed a hymenopteran sting pain scale, now known as the Schmidt sting pain index. In this index, a 0 is given to a sting from an insect that cannot break through human skin, a 2 is given for intermediate pain, and a 4 is given for intense pain. The scale rates stings from 78 different species in 42 different genera. The species Pepsis grossa, one of the species of tarantula hawk, has a sting rating of 4. The sting is described as "blinding, fierce, and shockingly electric. A running hair dryer has been dropped into your bubble bath."

== Gallery ==
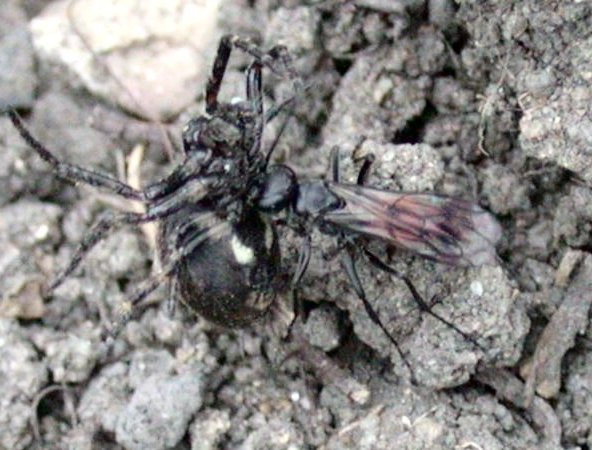
Anoplius viaticus with Nuctenea umbratica prey, England UK

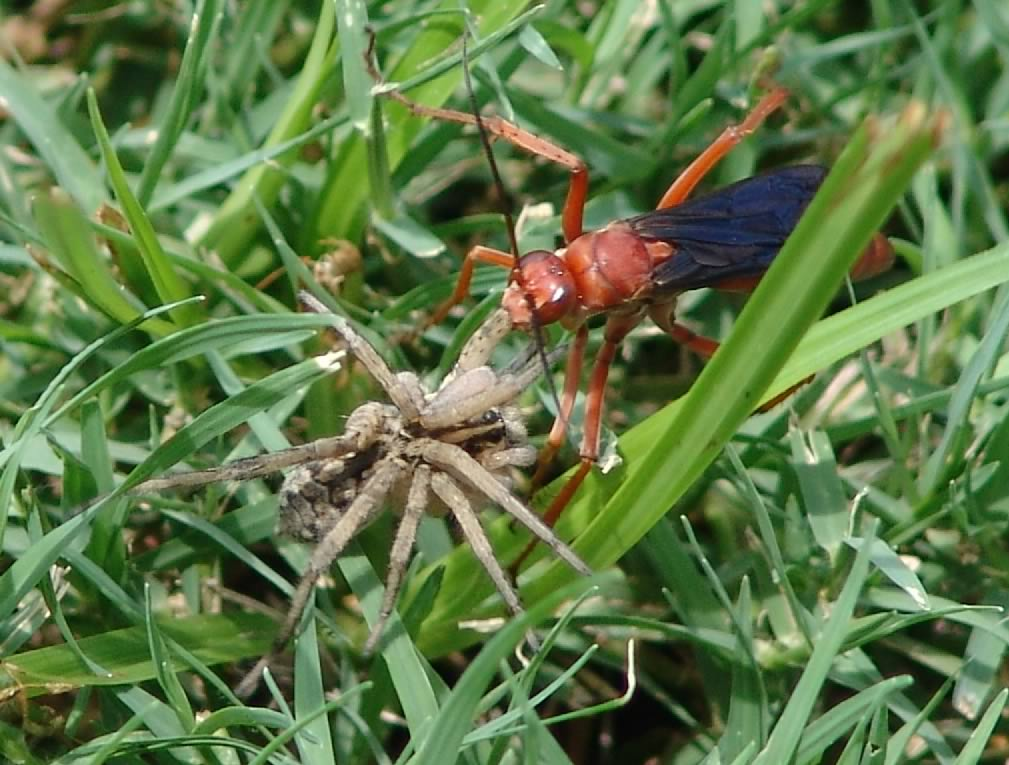
Tachypompilus ferrugineus, also known as the rusty spider wasp, hunting in Texas, United States

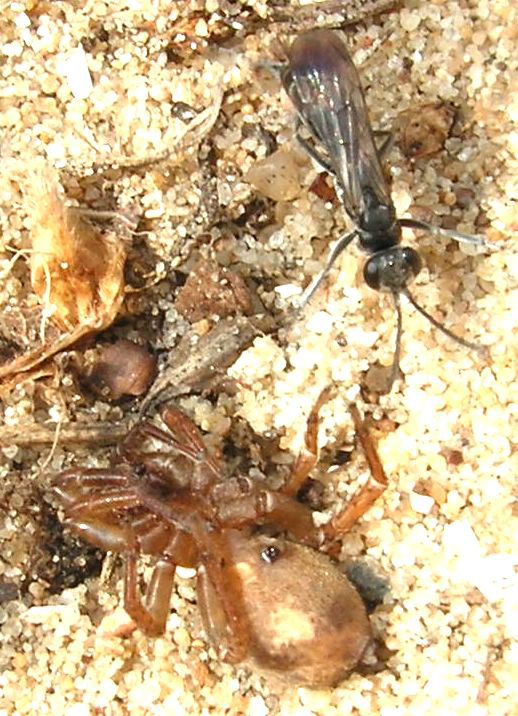
Unidentified spider wasp with its prey near Heemstede, Netherlands

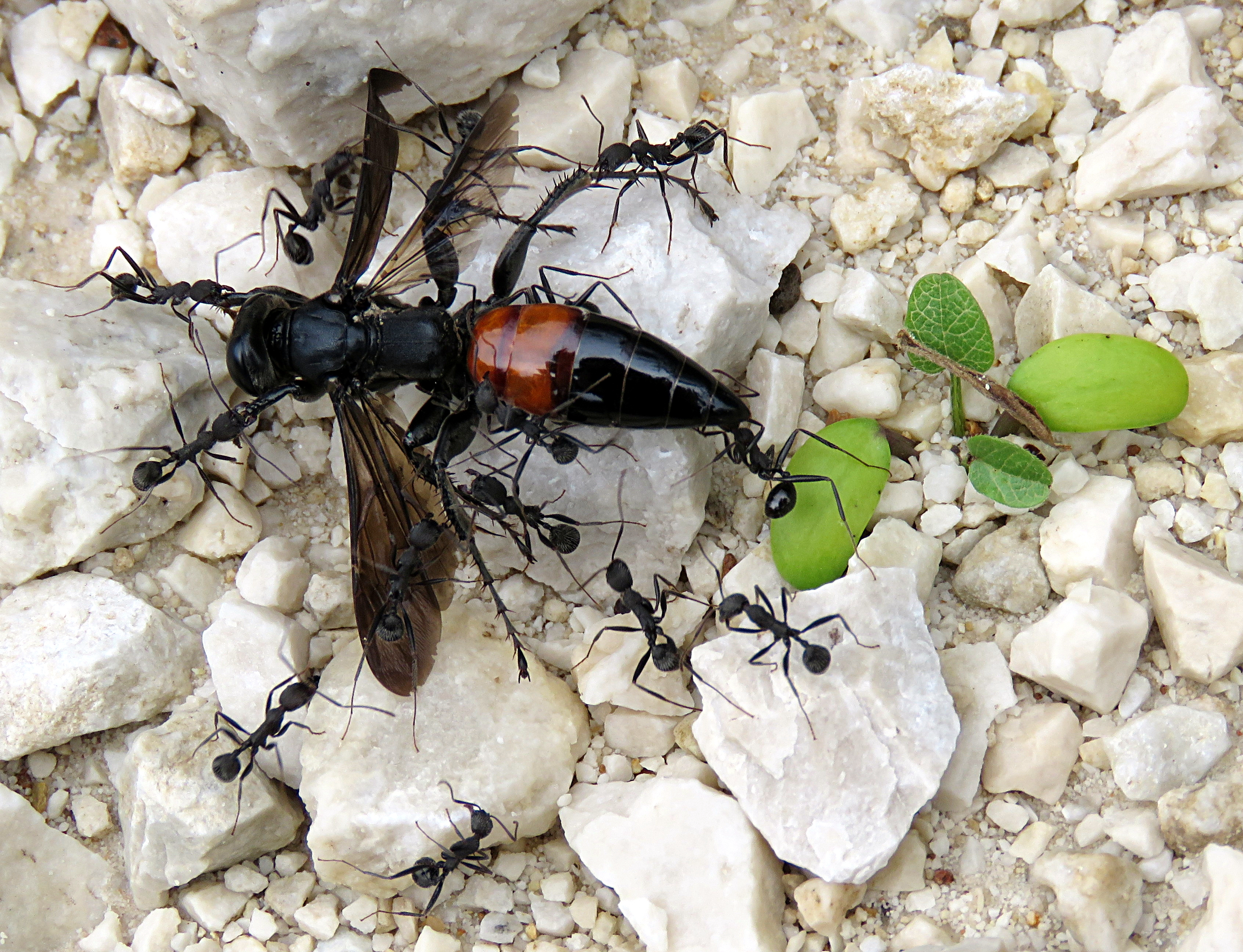
Unidentified spider wasp being carried off by ants.

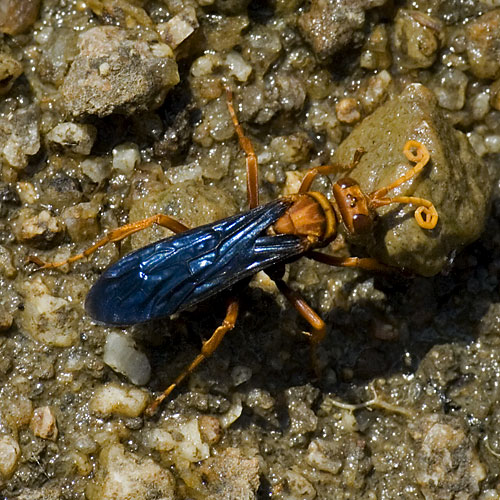
An unidentified pompilid from Bangalore, India

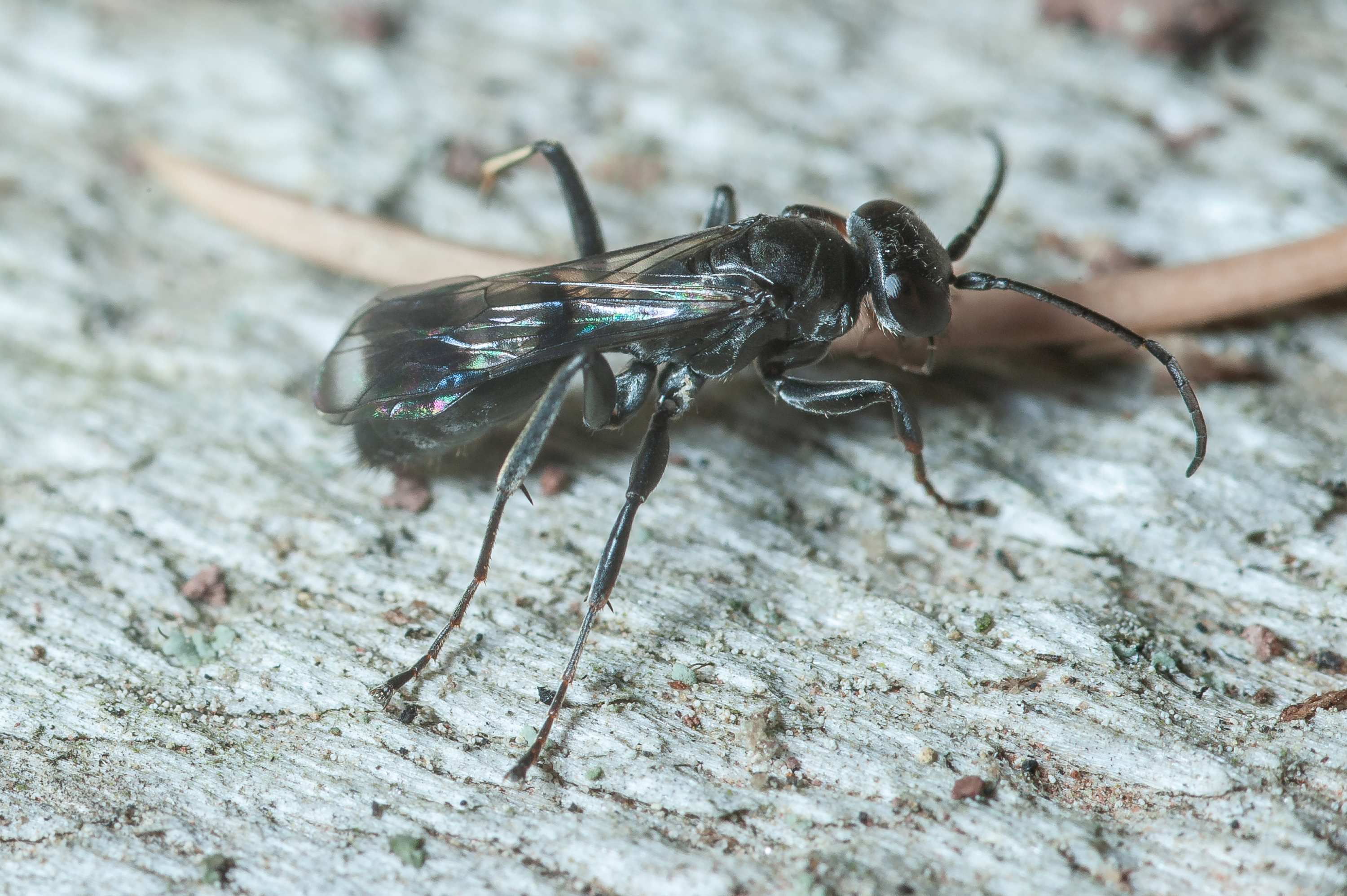
Female Dipogon subintermedius

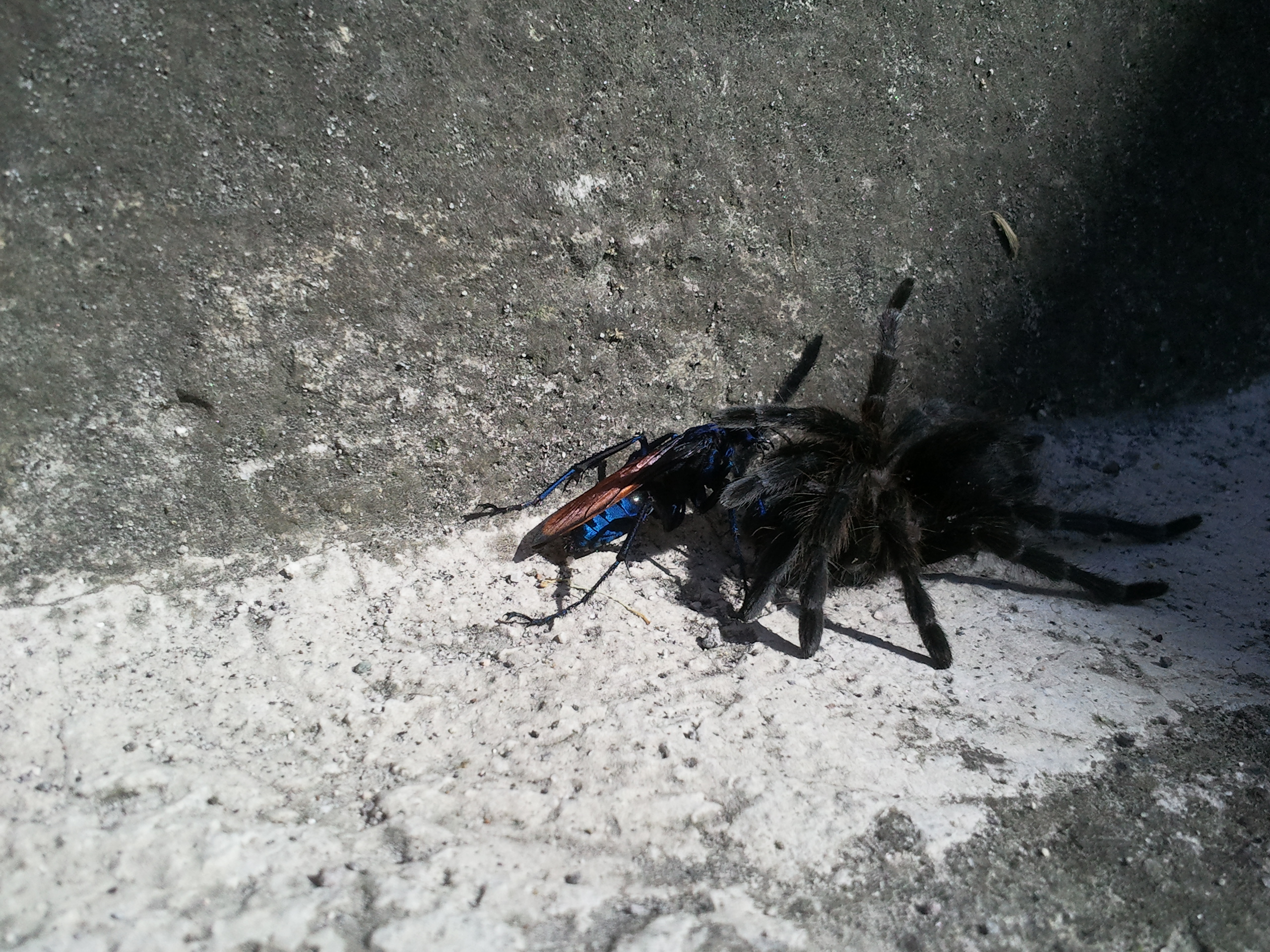
An unidentified pompilid has captured a spider in Quito, Ecuador.

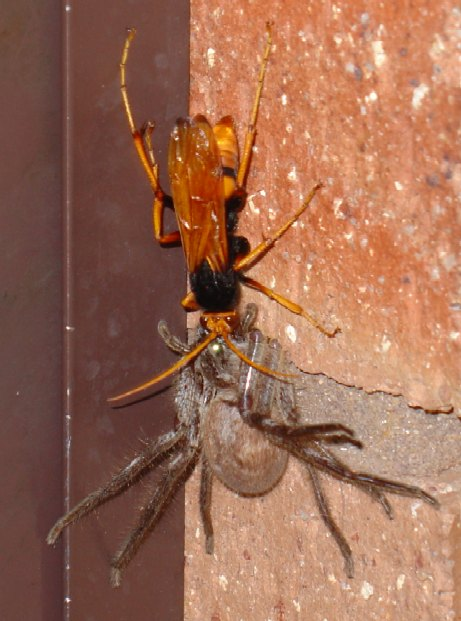
Heterodontonyx bicolor carrying an anaesthetised spider up to a nest in a roof.

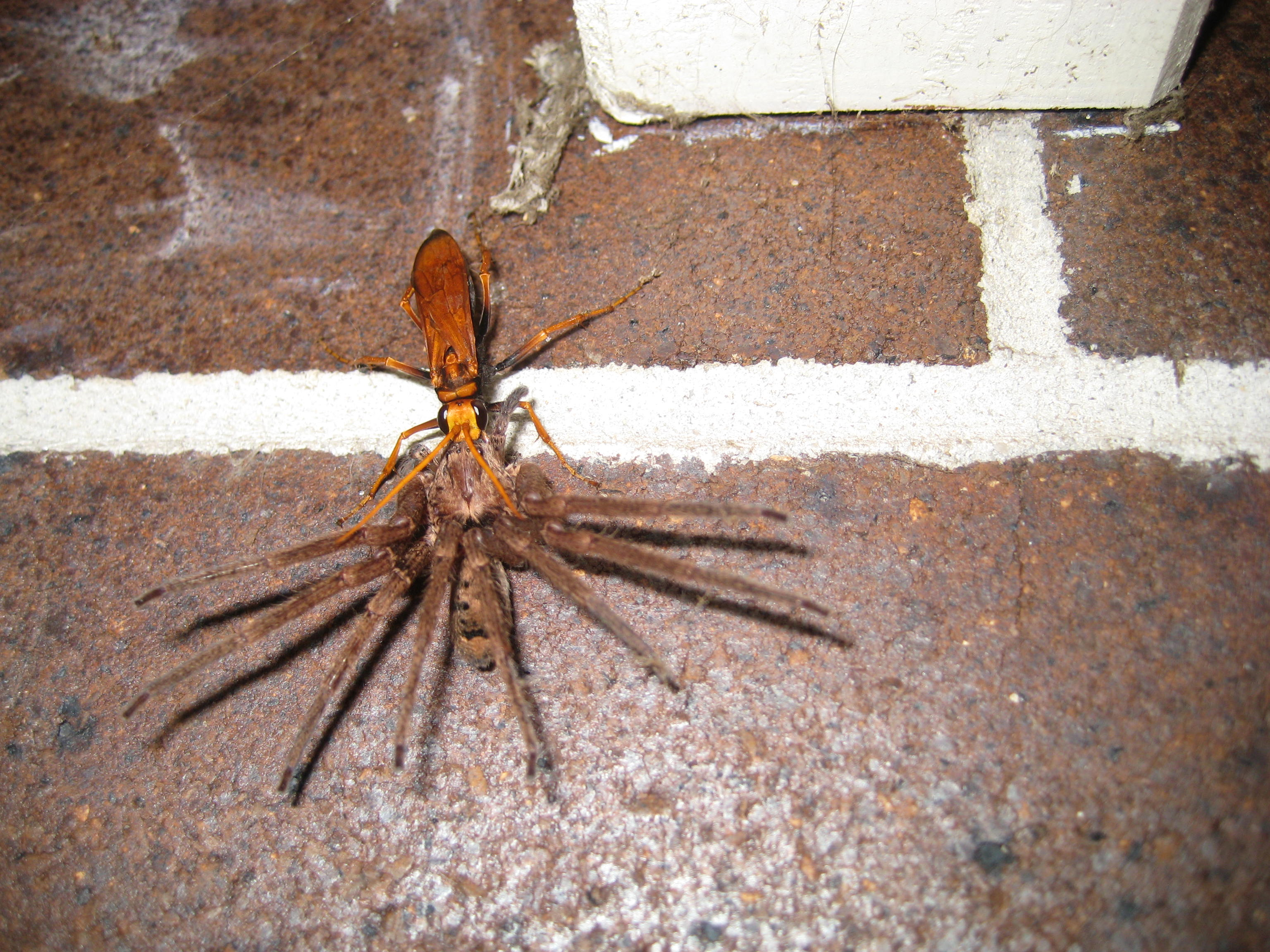
Heterodontonyx sp. dragging its captured prey in Sydney, Australia.

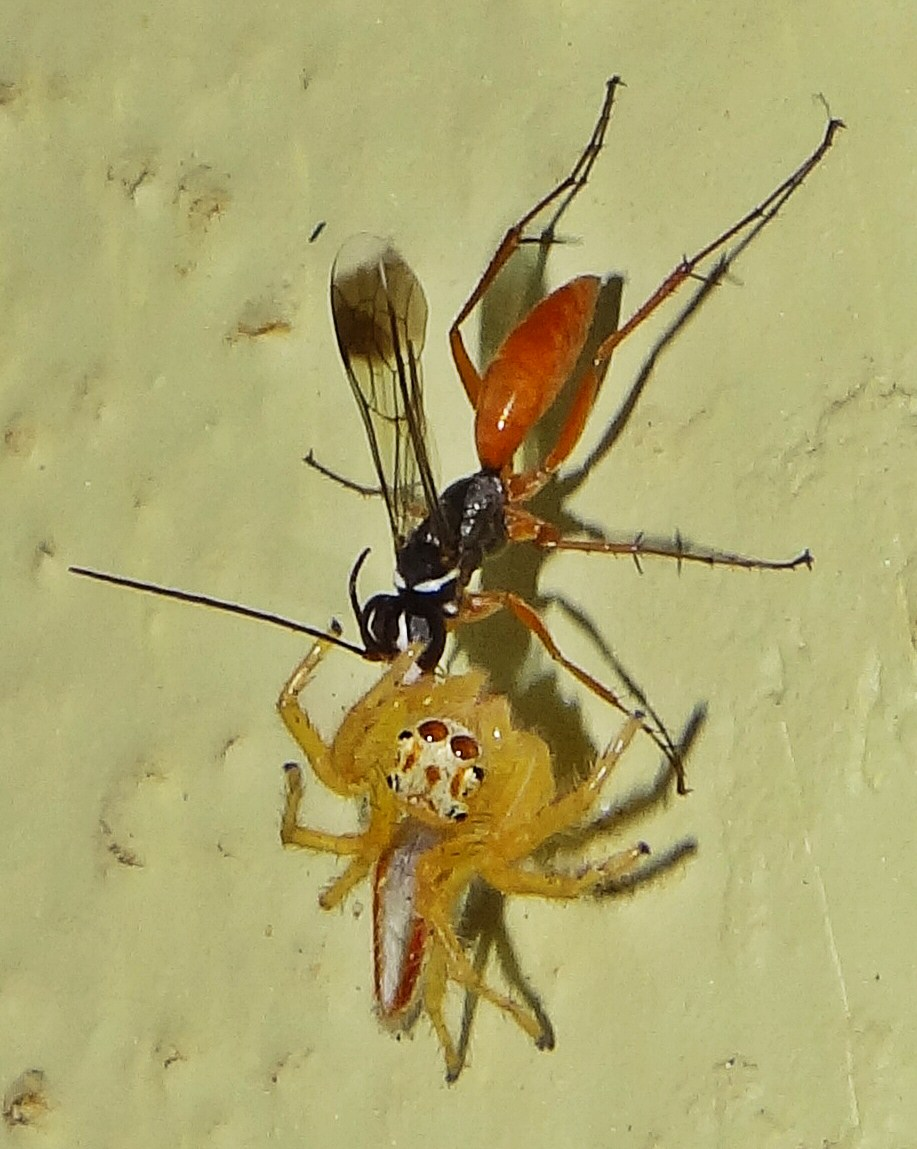
An unidentified Indian spider wasp carrying a jumping spider in Tumkur, India
