= List of Parasitica of Great Britain =

This article contains a list of wasps of Great Britain. The following species are of the order Hymenoptera and suborder Apocrita that is neither a bee nor ant.

== Family Embolemidae ==
- Embolemus ruddii

== Family Chrysididae (cuckoo wasps) ==
- Chrysis ignita
- Chrysis ruddii
- Chrysis viridula
- Cleptes britannicorum

== Family Tiphiidae ==
- Tiphia femorata

== Family Mutillidae ==
- Mutilla europaea

== Family Pompilidae (spider wasps) ==
=== Subfamily Ceropalinae ===
==== Genus Ceropales ====
- Ceropales maculata

=== Subfamily Pepsinae ===
==== Genus Auplopus ====
- Auplopus carbonarius

==== Genus Cryptocheilus ====
- Cryptocheilus notatus

==== Genus Dipogon ====
- Dipogon bifasciatus
- Dipogon subintermedius
- Dipogon variegatus

==== Genus Priocnemis ====
- Priocnemis perturbator

=== Subfamily Pompilinae ===
==== Genus Anoplius ====
- Anoplius nigerrimus

==== Genus Aporus ====
- Aporus unicolor

==== Genus Episyron ====
- Episyron gallicum
- Episyron rufipes

==== Genus Evagetes ====
- Evagetes crassicornis

==== Genus Homonotus ====
- Homonotus sanguinolentus

==== Genus Pompilus ====
- Pompilus cinereus – leaden spider wasp

== Family Vespidae ==
=== Subfamily Eumeninae (potter and mason wasps) ===
==== Genus Eumenes ====
- Eumenes coarctatus

==== Genus Pterochilus ====
- Pterochilus phaleratus

==== Genus Euodynerus ====
- Euodynerus quadrifasciatus

==== Genus Pseudepipona ====
- Pseudepipona herrichii – Purbeck mason wasp

==== Genus Odynerus ====
===== Subgenus Odynerus =====
- Odynerus melanocephalus
- Odynerus spinipes

===== Subgenus Spinicoxa =====
- Odynerus reniformis
- Odynerus simillimus

==== Genus Gymnomerus ====
- Gymnomerus laevipes

==== Genus Microdynerus ====
- Microdynerus exilis

==== Genus Ancistrocerus ====
- Ancistrocerus antilope
- Ancistrocerus gazella
- Ancistrocerus nigricornis
- Ancistrocerus parietinus
- Ancistrocerus parietum
- Ancistrocerus quadratus
- Ancistrocerus scoticus
- Ancistrocerus trifasciatus

==== Genus Symmorphus ====
- Symmorphus bifasciatus
- Symmorphus connexus
- Symmorphus crassicornis
- Symmorphus gracilis

=== Subfamily Polistinae (paper wasps) ===
==== Genus Polistes ====
- Polistes dominula

=== Subfamily Vespinae ===
==== Genus Vespa (hornets) ====
- Vespa crabro – European hornet

==== Genus Dolichovespula ====
===== Subgenus Dolichovespula =====
- Dolichovespula media – median wasp

===== Subgenus Pseudovespula =====
- Dolichovespula norwegica – Norwegian wasp
- Dolichovespula saxonica – Saxon wasp
- Dolichovespula sylvestris – tree wasp

==== Genus Vespula (typical social wasps) ====
===== Subgenus Vespula =====
- Vespula austriaca
- Vespula rufa – red wasp

===== Subgenus Paravespula =====
- Vespula germanica – German wasp
- Vespula vulgaris – common wasp

== Family Sphecidae ==
Ammophila sabulosa

== Family Crabronidae ==
- Cerceris rybyensis – ornate tailed digger wasp

== Family Philanthidae ==
- Philanthus triangulum – European beewolf
