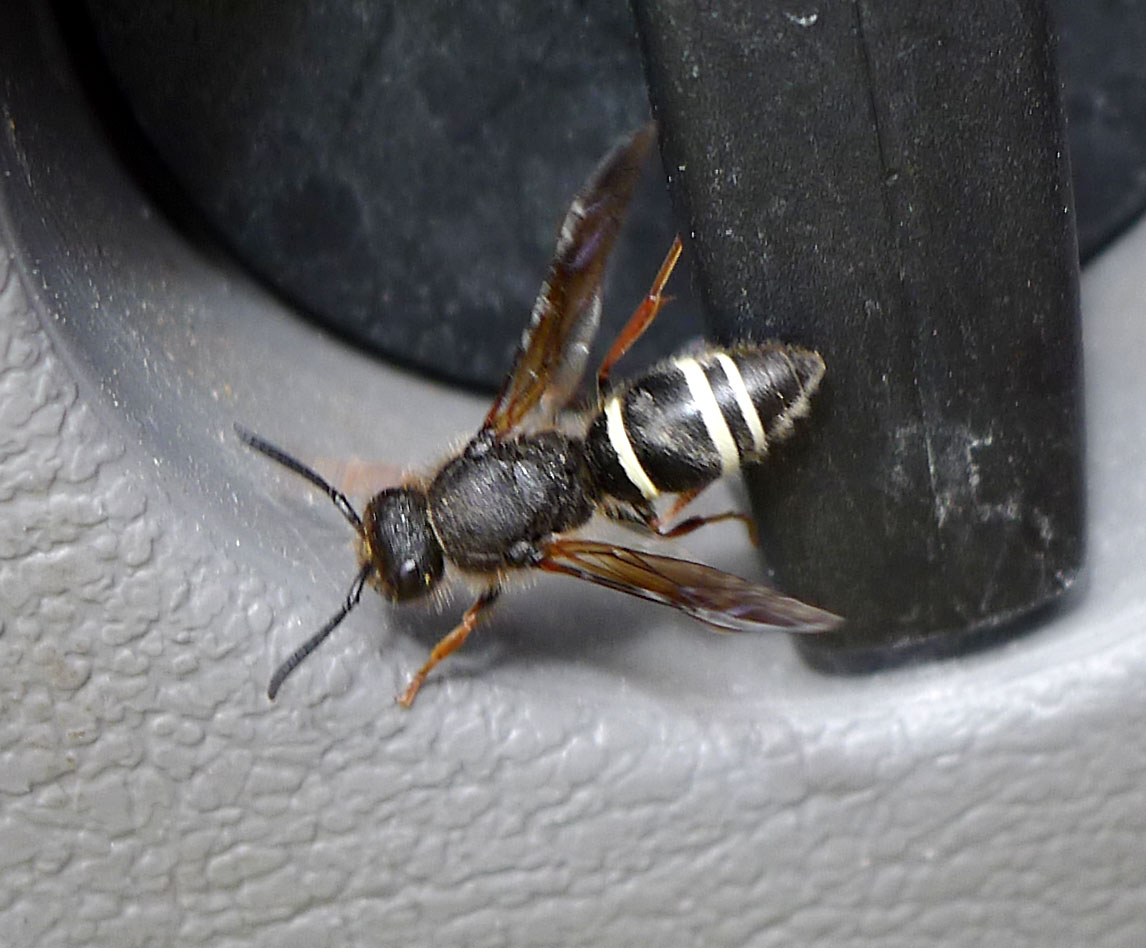

Scientific classification
- Kingdom: Animalia
- Phylum: Arthropoda
- Clade: Pancrustacea
- Class: Insecta
- Order: Hymenoptera
- Family: Vespidae
- Subfamily: Eumeninae
- Genus: Ancistrocerus
- Species: A. scoticus

Binomial name
- Ancistrocerus scoticus (Curtis, 1826)

Synonyms
- Ancistrocerus albotricinctus (Zetterstedt, 1838); Odynerus albotricinctus Zetterstedt, 1838; Odynerus scoticus Curtis, 1826

= Ancistrocerus scoticus =

Species of wasp

Ancistrocerus scoticus is a Palearctic species of potter wasp.

== Description ==
Ancistrocerus scoticus is not easy to distinguish from some sympatric congeners and is frequently misidentified as Ancistrocerus trimarginatus. In most of its range this species is mainly black with yellow tergal bands but in western Scotland and coastal Ireland these bands are coloured ivory-white.

== Distribution ==
Ancistrocerus scoticus occurs throughout the Palearctic from Ireland south to northern Morocco east to Kamchatka, including Korea. In Britain it is scarce but widespread, although it is absent from the Shetland, the Channel Islands and much of Ireland.

== Habitat ==
Ancistrocerus scoticus has a rather catholic choice of habitats and has been recorded in moorland, sandy areas such as lowland and coastal heaths, woodlands on clay and sandy soils, parkland, quarries (especially limestone and sandstone), calcareous grassland, gardens, coastal cliffs, wetlands, sand dunes and shingle.

== Biology ==
In Britain Ancistrocerus scoticus is probably univoltine flying mainly from June to August, occasionally it has been recorded as early as May and as late as September, and very infrequently in April. The main prey consists of small caterpillars of butterflies and moths, but it will also take the grubs of chrysomelid beetles. It normally builds clay cells in hollow spaces such as crevices in rocks, cracks in man made stone structures, cavities among pebbles and slag heaps at mines, as well as within the bark of pine trees and the dry, dead stems of such plants as elder and in reeds. Females are able to burrow into flat bare soil to form her oval cells which are made mainly of clay, and in these circumstances the openings of the cells are level with the soil surface and may be in a group. The adults have been recorded foraging for nectar at the flowers of sea holly, brambles, hogweed and thistles.

The cuckoo wasp Chrysis ignita is known to be a kleptoparasite of A. scoticus and it is probable that Chrysis rutiliventris is also a kleptoparasite of this species.

== Subspecies ==
There are three recognised subspecies of Ancistrocerus scoticus:

- Ancistrocerus scoticus iberogallicus Blüthgen, 1956
- Ancistrocerus scoticus meridianus Gusenleitner, 1977
- Ancistrocerus scoticus scoticus (Curtis, 1826)
