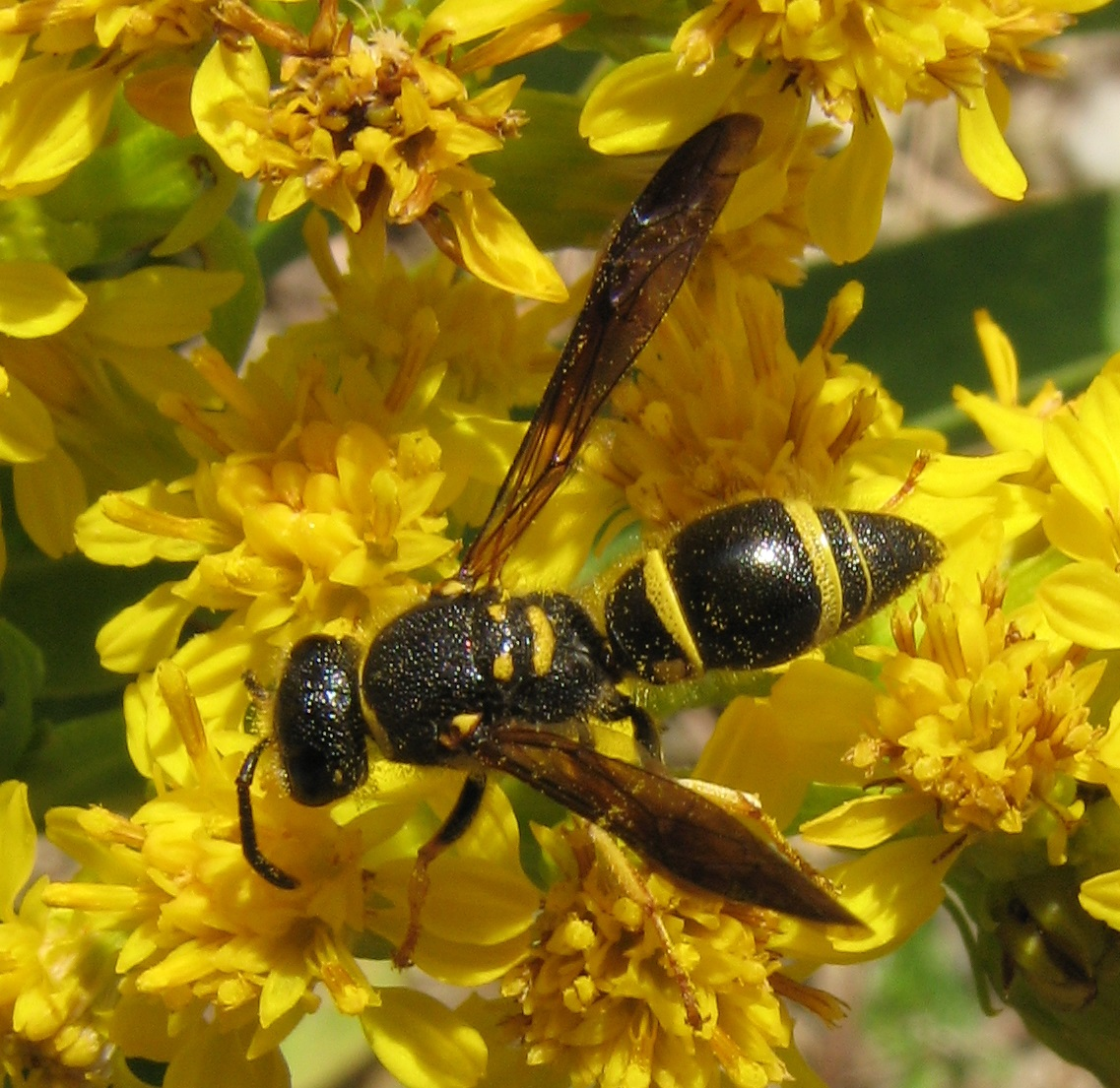
- Ancistrocerus campestris on goldenrod

Scientific classification
- Kingdom: Animalia
- Phylum: Arthropoda
- Clade: Pancrustacea
- Class: Insecta
- Order: Hymenoptera
- Family: Vespidae
- Subfamily: Eumeninae
- Genus: Ancistrocerus; Wesmael, 1836

= Ancistrocerus =

Genus of insects

Ancistrocerus nigricornis in copula (video, 1m 50s)

Ancistrocerus is a widely distributed genus of potter wasps present in many biogeographical regions of the world. They are nonpetiolate eumenine wasps with a transverse ridge at the bending summit of the first metasomal tergum and with a low and opaque propodeal lamella completely fused to the submarginal carina.

The name of this genus (meaning "hooked horn" for the back-curved last segments of the antennae characteristic of males of this genus and most other potter wasp genera) has been widely used as root in the construction of many other genus-level names for potter wasps with a nonpetiolated metasoma and normally bearing a transverse ridge on the first metasomal tergum, such as Ancistroceroides, Parancistrocerus, Orancistrocerus, Tachyancistrocerus, etc.

== Species ==
The Interim Register of Marine and Nonmarine Genera (IRMNG) lists the following 211 recognized species in the genus:

- Ancistrocerus abditus Gusenleitner, 1977
- Ancistrocerus acanthopus Cameron
- Ancistrocerus adenensis Giordani Soika, 1952
- Ancistrocerus adiabatus (Saussure, 1853)
- Ancistrocerus agilis Smith
- Ancistrocerus andreinii Giordani Soika, 1939
- Ancistrocerus androcles (Meade-Waldo)
- Ancistrocerus angulata Donovan, 1810
- Ancistrocerus antilope (Panzer, 1789)
- Ancistrocerus antoni (Cameron, 1900)
- Ancistrocerus arcanus Giordani Soika, 1993
- Ancistrocerus argelus Cameron, 1905
- Ancistrocerus aristae (Saussure, 1857)
- Ancistrocerus assamensis (Meade-Waldo)
- Ancistrocerus atlanticus (Kirby, 1884)
- Ancistrocerus atroalbus Giordani Soika, 1960
- Ancistrocerus atropos (Lepeletier)
- Ancistrocerus auctus Fabricius, 1793
- Ancistrocerus aureovillosus Giordani Soika, 1977
- Ancistrocerus baluchistanensis (Cameron)
- Ancistrocerus behrensi Tucker, 1910
- Ancistrocerus beieri Giordani Soika, 1960
- Ancistrocerus belizensis Cameron
- Ancistrocerus bilaminatus Vecht, 1937
- Ancistrocerus biphaleratus (Saussure, 1852)
- Ancistrocerus birenimaculatus (Saussure, 1852)
- Ancistrocerus bistrigata Blüthgen, 1938
- Ancistrocerus boreanus Giordani Soika
- Ancistrocerus borneanus Giordani Soika, 1996
- Ancistrocerus borneomontanus Gusenleitner, 1997
- Ancistrocerus budongo (Meade-Waldo)
- Ancistrocerus burensis Giordani Soika
- Ancistrocerus bustamente (Saussure, 1857)
- Ancistrocerus caelestimontanus Kostylev, 1940
- Ancistrocerus camicrus (Cameron)
- Ancistrocerus campestris (Saussure, 1853)
- Ancistrocerus capensis (Saussure, 1854)
- Ancistrocerus carinicollis (Cameron)
- Ancistrocerus catharinae Cameron, 1913
- Ancistrocerus catskill (Saussure, 1853)
- Ancistrocerus cervus Giordani Soika, 1974
- Ancistrocerus chotanensis Blüthgen, 1942
- Ancistrocerus claripennis Thomson, 1874
- Ancistrocerus contrarius Giordani Soika, 1966
- Ancistrocerus cupreipennis (Bingham)
- Ancistrocerus danticoides Giordani Soika
- Ancistrocerus densepilosellus Cameron, 1911
- Ancistrocerus dolorans Giordani Soika
- Ancistrocerus dolosus Gusenleitner, 1993
- Ancistrocerus durangoensis Cameron, 1908
- Ancistrocerus dusmetiolus (Strand, 1914)
- Ancistrocerus ebusianus (Licht., 1884)
- Ancistrocerus egidae Giordani Soika
- Ancistrocerus epicus (Zav., 1912)
- Ancistrocerus erythropus (Bingham)
- Ancistrocerus excisa Faester, 1961
- Ancistrocerus fasciaticollis Giordani Soika, 1974
- Ancistrocerus ferghanicus Blüthgen, 1955
- Ancistrocerus ferrugineoclypeatus Giordani Soika, 1960
- Ancistrocerus flaviventris Giordani Soika, 1986
- Ancistrocerus flavomarginatus (Brethes, 1906)
- Ancistrocerus fluvialis (Saussure, 1856)
- Ancistrocerus fortunatus Blüthgen, 1954
- Ancistrocerus foxeanus Cameron, 1906
- Ancistrocerus frigidus Giordani Soika, 1977
- Ancistrocerus fukaianus (Schulthess)
- Ancistrocerus fulvicarpus Cameron, 1908
- Ancistrocerus fulvitarsis Cameron, 1908
- Ancistrocerus gazella (Panzer, 1798)
- Ancistrocerus geae Giordani Soika, 1974
- Ancistrocerus gunnisonensis Cameron, 1906
- Ancistrocerus haematodes (Brullé, 1840)
- Ancistrocerus handschini (Schulthess, 1935)
- Ancistrocerus hangaicus Kurzenko, 1977
- Ancistrocerus heirinus Sonan, 1939
- Ancistrocerus hirsutus (Meade-Waldo, 1910)
- Ancistrocerus horni Sonan, 1938
- Ancistrocerus hypodynericolor Giordani Soika, 1966
- Ancistrocerus ichneumonideus (Ratz., 1844)
- Ancistrocerus impunctatus (Spinosa, 1838)
- Ancistrocerus inconstans (Saussure)
- Ancistrocerus intermediatus Sonan, 1939
- Ancistrocerus iranensis Giordani Soika, 1943
- Ancistrocerus japonicus (Schulthess, 1908)
- Ancistrocerus kazbekianus Kostylev, 1940
- Ancistrocerus kenyaensis Giordani Soika, 1974
- Ancistrocerus kerneri (Dalla Torre, 1904)
- Ancistrocerus khangmarensis Giordani Soika, 1966
- Ancistrocerus kisangani Bequard
- Ancistrocerus kitcheneri (Dusmet, 1917)
- Ancistrocerus krausei Giordani Soika, 1966
- Ancistrocerus kuraruensis Sonan, 1939
- Ancistrocerus laminiger (Grib.)
- Ancistrocerus lecontei Cameron, 1908
- Ancistrocerus leensis Cameron, 1908
- Ancistrocerus liliae Giordani Soika, 1952
- Ancistrocerus lindemanni Cameron
- Ancistrocerus lineaticollis Cameron, 1910
- Ancistrocerus lineativentris Cameron, 1906
- Ancistrocerus longipilosus Cameron
- Ancistrocerus longispinosus (Saussure, 1855)
- Ancistrocerus lucasius Maindron, 1882
- Ancistrocerus lufirae (Meade-Waldo)
- Ancistrocerus lutonidus Bohart, 1974
- Ancistrocerus maculiscapus (Cameron, 1910)
- Ancistrocerus madaera (Saussure, 1853)
- Ancistrocerus managuaensis Cameron, 1906
- Ancistrocerus marginaticollis Giordani Soika, 1939
- Ancistrocerus maroccanus Gusenleitner, 1977
- Ancistrocerus massaicus (Cameron)
- Ancistrocerus matangensis (Cameron)
- Ancistrocerus mediterraneus Blüthgen, 1952
- Ancistrocerus megaspilus (Cameron, 1907)
- Ancistrocerus melanocerus (Dalla Torre, 1894)
- Ancistrocerus melanurus Morawitz, 1889
- Ancistrocerus microcynoeca Schrottky, 1911
- Ancistrocerus minnesotaensis Cameron
- Ancistrocerus moeschleri Blüthgen, 1938
- Ancistrocerus mongolicus Kostylev, 1940
- Ancistrocerus monstricornis Giordani Soika
- Ancistrocerus montuosus Gusenleitner, 1993
- Ancistrocerus morator Gusenleitner, 1987
- Ancistrocerus multipictus Smith
- Ancistrocerus nearcticus Cameron, 1906
- Ancistrocerus neavei (Meade-Waldo, 1915)
- Ancistrocerus neocallosus Bequard, 1943
- Ancistrocerus neuvillei (Buysson, 1906)
- Ancistrocerus nigricapitus Sonan, 1939
- Ancistrocerus nigricornis (Curtis, 1826)
- Ancistrocerus nigricornis Morawitz, 1889
- Ancistrocerus nilensis Giordani Soika
- Ancistrocerus nitidissimus Giordani Soika
- Ancistrocerus nominalis Faester, 1961
- Ancistrocerus ochraceopictus Giordani Soika, 1960
- Ancistrocerus ormsbyensis Cameron, 1905
- Ancistrocerus oviventris (Wesmael, 1836)
- Ancistrocerus pakistanus Giordani Soika, 1986
- Ancistrocerus palaestinicus Giordani Soika
- Ancistrocerus paracallosus Bequard, 1943
- Ancistrocerus parapoloi Giordani Soika, 1966
- Ancistrocerus parazairensis Giordani Soika
- Ancistrocerus parietinus Linnaeus, 1761
- Ancistrocerus parietum Linnaeus, 1758
- Ancistrocerus parredes Saussure, 1857
- Ancistrocerus parvispinosus Cameron, 1906
- Ancistrocerus pelias Cameron, 1908
- Ancistrocerus pharao (Saussure)
- Ancistrocerus philippinus Giordani Soika, 1996
- Ancistrocerus phoenixensis Cameron, 1908
- Ancistrocerus pictipes Thomson, 1874
- Ancistrocerus pilosus (Saussure, 1856)
- Ancistrocerus polonica Blüthgen, 1952
- Ancistrocerus punjabensis (Nurse)
- Ancistrocerus quebecensis Cameron, 1906
- Ancistrocerus raddei Kostylev, 1940
- Ancistrocerus reconditus Gusenleitner, 1983
- Ancistrocerus reflexus (Fox)
- Ancistrocerus renimacula Lepeletier, 1841
- Ancistrocerus rhipheus (Cameron)
- Ancistrocerus rhodensis Saussure
- Ancistrocerus rivularis Cameron, 1908
- Ancistrocerus robertsianus (Cameron)
- Ancistrocerus roubaudi Bequard
- Ancistrocerus rubrotinctus Giordani Soika, 1957
- Ancistrocerus rufoluteus Gusenleitner, 1996
- Ancistrocerus rufopictus (Meade-Waldo, 1915)
- Ancistrocerus rufopictus Kostylev, 1940
- Ancistrocerus sabahensis Giordani Soika
- Ancistrocerus santa-annae (Saussure, 1857)
- Ancistrocerus satyrus Cameron, 1908
- Ancistrocerus scoticus (Curtis, 1826)
- Ancistrocerus scoticus (Wesm.)
- Ancistrocerus serenus Giordani Soika
- Ancistrocerus sexcingulatus Ashmead, 1901
- Ancistrocerus sichelii (Saussure)
- Ancistrocerus sikhimensis (Bingham, 1898)
- Ancistrocerus similis (Smith, 1857)
- Ancistrocerus simulator (Cameron, 1908)
- Ancistrocerus sounkionis (Tsuneki, 1986)
- Ancistrocerus spilogaster Cameron, 1905
- Ancistrocerus spinolae (Saussure, 1856)
- Ancistrocerus striativentris (Cameron, 1910)
- Ancistrocerus subrenimacula Blüthgen, 1938
- Ancistrocerus tahoensis Rohwer, 1917
- Ancistrocerus taikonus Sonan, 1939
- Ancistrocerus tardinotus Bequard, 1925
- Ancistrocerus tardinotus Taylor, 1922
- Ancistrocerus tenellus (Kostylev, 1935)
- Ancistrocerus terayamai Sk. Yamane, 1993
- Ancistrocerus terekensis Kostylev, 1940
- Ancistrocerus thalassarctos (Dalla Torre)
- Ancistrocerus thomsoni Blüthgen, 1938
- Ancistrocerus tibetanus Giordani Soika, 1966
- Ancistrocerus tityrus Cameron, 1908
- Ancistrocerus trichionotus Cameron, 1905
- Ancistrocerus trifasciatus (Müller, 1776)
- Ancistrocerus triphaleratus Saussure
- Ancistrocerus truncatus Cameron, 1908
- Ancistrocerus tuberculocephalus (Saussure, 1853)
- Ancistrocerus tussaci Gusenleitner, 1987
- Ancistrocerus unifasciatus (Saussure, 1853)
- Ancistrocerus verhaereni Bondroid, 1943
- Ancistrocerus vigilans Blüthgen, 1954
- Ancistrocerus waldenii (Viereck, 1906)
- Ancistrocerus waltoni (Meade-Waldo, 1910)
- Ancistrocerus xanthodesmus Schrottky, 1909
- Ancistrocerus xanthozonus (Cameron, 1908)
- Ancistrocerus yamanei Giordani Soika, 1986
- Ancistrocerus zairensis Bequard
- Ancistrocerus zebra (Saussure, 1863)

There are further species not listed above, including:

- Ancistrocerus capra (Saussure, 1857)
- Ancistrocerus coreanus
- Ancistrocerus densepilosellus
- Ancistrocerus extremus
- Ancistrocerus isla
- Ancistrocerus leleji
- Ancistrocerus tenebrosus
