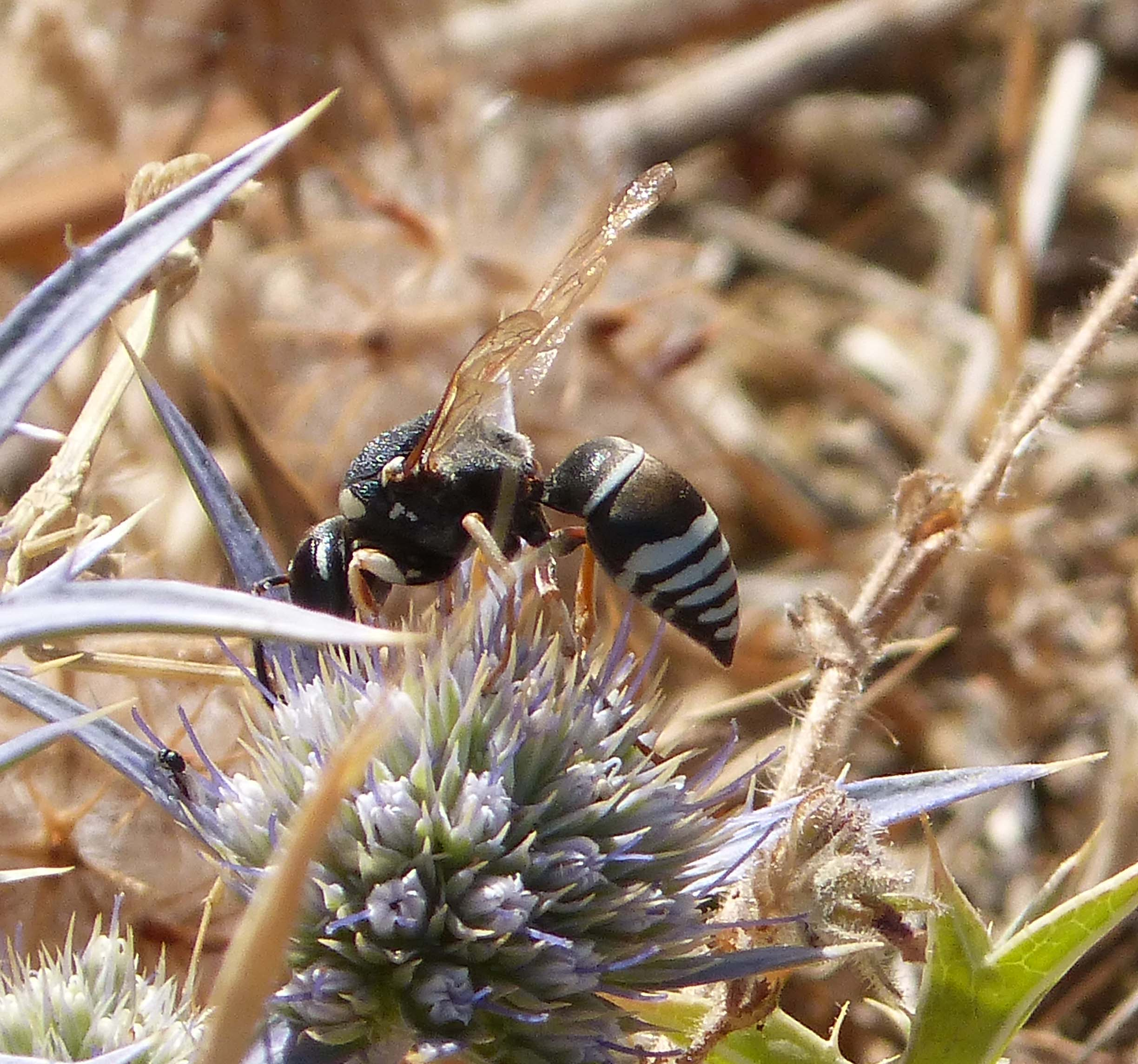
- Cephalochilus labiatus hispanicus

Scientific classification
- Domain: Eukaryota
- Kingdom: Animalia
- Phylum: Arthropoda
- Class: Insecta
- Order: Hymenoptera
- Family: Vespidae
- Subfamily: Eumeninae
- Genus: Cephalochilus; Blüthgen, 1939

Species
- See text

= Cephalochilus =

Genus of wasps

Cephalochilus is a palearctic genus of potter wasps. It contains the following species:

- Cephalochilus draco Giordani Soika, 1970
- Cephalochilus labiatus (Fabricius, 1798)
