= Alastorynerus =

Scientific classification
- Domain: Eukaryota
- Kingdom: Animalia
- Phylum: Arthropoda
- Class: Insecta
- Order: Hymenoptera
- Family: Vespidae
- Subfamily: Eumeninae
- Genus: Alastorynerus (Blüthgen, 1938)

Species
- Alastorynerus ludendorffi; Alastorynerus microdynerus; Alastorynerus perezi; Alastorynerus wolffi

Genus of wasps

Alastorynerus is a genus of potter wasps.
