= Bees, Wasps and Ants Recording Society =

British entomological society

Coordinates: 52°47′20.1″N 1°34′19.9″W

The Bees, Wasps and Ants Recording Society (BWARS) is a British society dedicated to recording bees, wasps and ants.

== See also ==
- List of bees of Great Britain
- List of wasps of Great Britain
- List of ants of Great Britain
