= Alastorynerus microdynerus =

Scientific classification
- Kingdom: Animalia
- Phylum: Arthropoda
- Clade: Pancrustacea
- Class: Insecta
- Order: Hymenoptera
- Family: Vespidae
- Genus: Alastorynerus
- Species: A. microdynerus

Binomial name
- Alastorynerus microdynerus (Dalla Torre, 1889)

Species of wasp

Alastorynerus microdynerus is a species of wasp in the family Vespidae.
