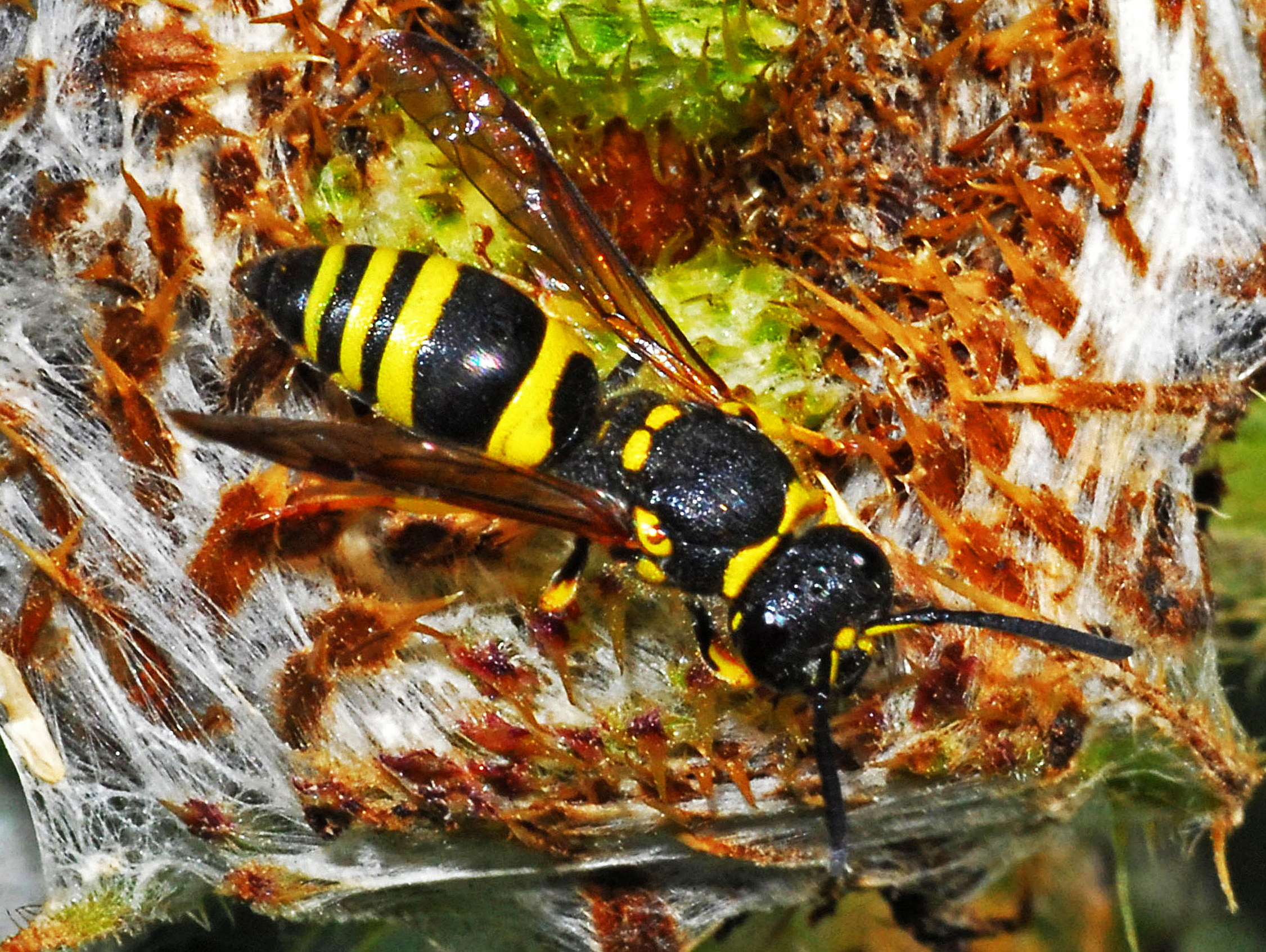
- Ancistrocerus longispinosus longispinosus. Dorsal view
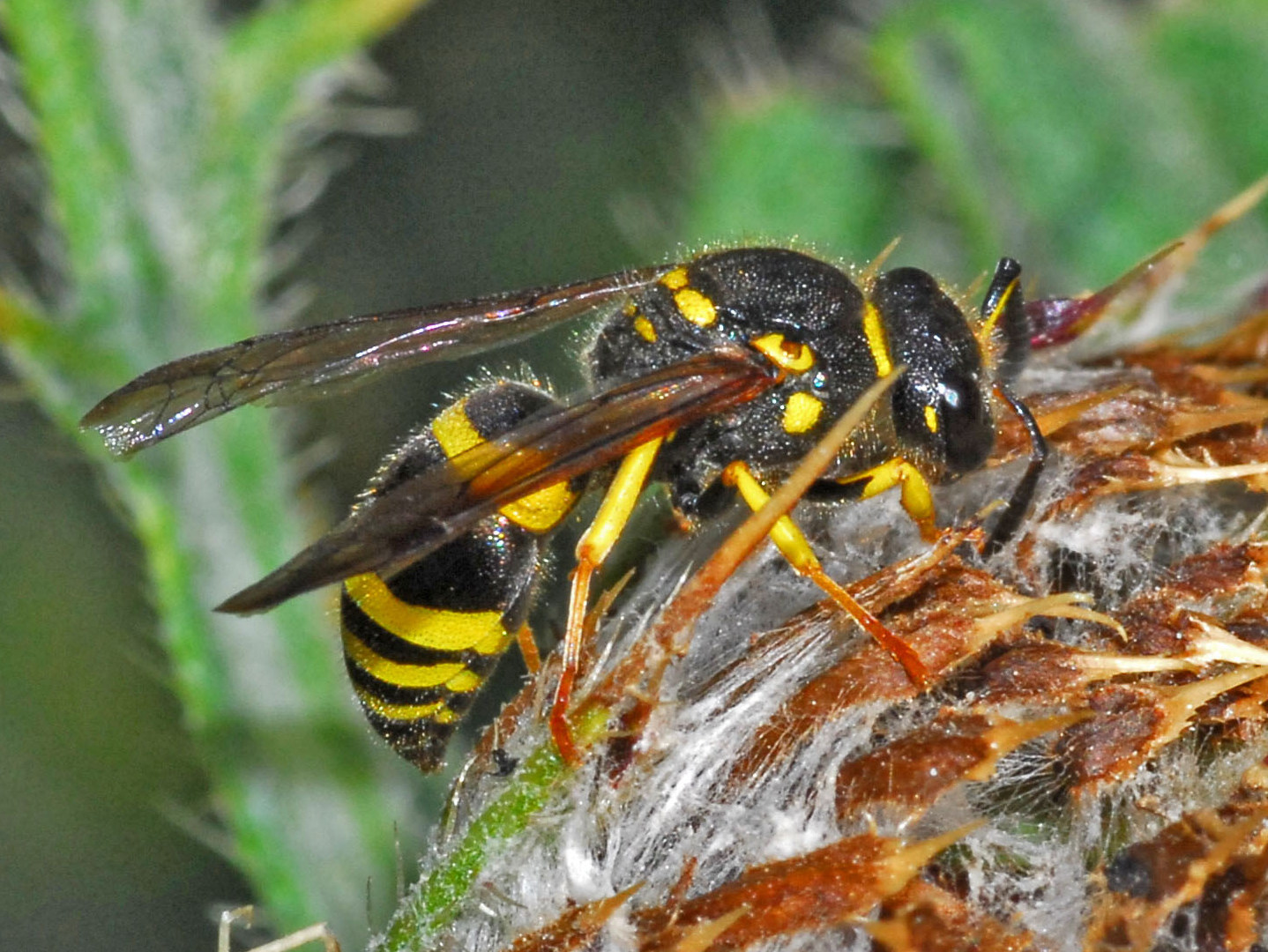
- Side view

Scientific classification
- Domain: Eukaryota
- Kingdom: Animalia
- Phylum: Arthropoda
- Class: Insecta
- Order: Hymenoptera
- Family: Vespidae
- Genus: Ancistrocerus
- Species: A. longispinosus

Binomial name
- Ancistrocerus longispinosus (Saussure, 1855)

Synonyms
- Odynerus longispinosus Saussure, 1855

= Ancistrocerus longispinosus =

Species of wasp

Ancistrocerus longispinosus is a species of potter wasp, belonging to the family Vespidae, subfamily Eumeninae.

== Etymology ==
The Latin genus name Ancistrocerus means hooked horn. for the back-curved last segments of the antennae characteristic of males. The species name longispinosus means with long thorns.

== Subspecies ==
Subspecies include:

- Ancistrocerus longispinosus longispinosus (Saussure, 1855)
- Ancistrocerus longispinosus gazelloides Giuglia, 1945 (endemic to Corsica and Sardinia)
- Ancistrocerus longispinosus hellenicus Blüthgen, 1957

== Distribution ==
This species is present in Southern Europe (Albania, Balearic Islands, Croatia, Cyprus, Dodecanese Islands, European Turkey, France, Greece, Italy, Portugal, Spain and Ukraine), in the Near East and in North Africa.

== Description ==
These nonpetiolate eumenine wasps has a transverse ridge at the bending summit of the first metasomal tergum and a low and opaque propodeal lamella completely fused to the submarginal carina. The second sternite is more or less concave at the base, the propodeum is black and the wings are darkened at the apex. They show four yellow abdominal bands, Legs are mainly yellow.

== Biology ==
These wasp have a solitary lifestyle. Mothers nest alone, usually utilizing pre-existing cavities. They provide larvae with preserved preys (mainly Lepidopteran, Coleopteran and Hymenopteran larvae) that they paralyze with their sting.

== Bibliography ==
- Guido Pagliano (2003) Naturalista Siciliano, Giornale di Scienze Naturali. Ricerche imenotterologiche nelle isole di Lampedusa e Pantelleria, Volume: 27 Pages: 115-149 (in Italian)
- Horst-Günter Woydak (2001) Natur und Heimat Die solitären Faltenwespen: Eumenidae (Lehmwespen) und Masaridae (Honigwespen im Westfälischen Museum für Naturkunde Münster, Volume: 61 Pages: 85-95 (in German)
- Antonio Giordani Soika (1966) Boll.Mus.Civ.Stor.nat.Venezia Notulae vespidologicae XXIV. Ancistrocerus plaeartici nuovi o poco noti., Volume: 17 Pages: 81-88 (in Italian)
