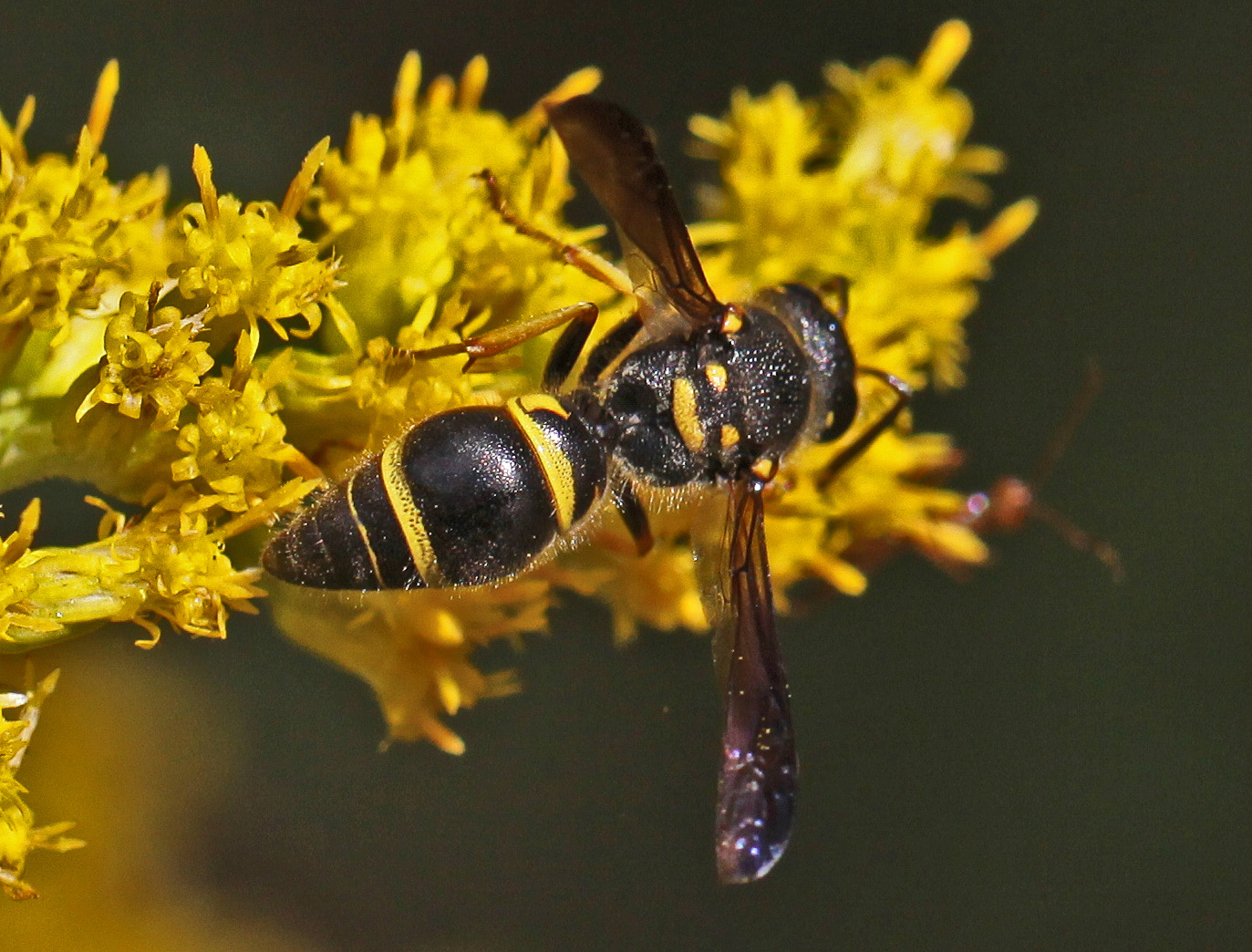

Scientific classification
- Kingdom: Animalia
- Phylum: Arthropoda
- Clade: Pancrustacea
- Class: Insecta
- Order: Hymenoptera
- Family: Vespidae
- Genus: Ancistrocerus
- Species: A. campestris

Binomial name
- Ancistrocerus campestris (de Saussure, 1853)

= Ancistrocerus campestris =

Species of wasp

Ancistrocerus campestris is a species of potter wasp. Adults grow up to 10 mm (0.394 in) in length. Quickly identified by the coloration on the rear of its thorax which is reminiscent of a smiley face. Preys on the caterpillars of Amphisbatidae and Gelechiidae.
