= Alastorynerus ludendorffi =

Scientific classification
- Kingdom: Animalia
- Phylum: Arthropoda
- Clade: Pancrustacea
- Class: Insecta
- Order: Hymenoptera
- Family: Vespidae
- Genus: Alastorynerus
- Species: A. ludendorffi

Binomial name
- Alastorynerus ludendorffi (Dusmet, 1917)

Species of wasp

Alastorynerus ludendorffi is a species of wasp in the family Vespidae.

The species was named in 1917 after the German General Erich Ludendorff, First Quartermaster-general of the Imperial Army's Great General Staff in the previous year, a chief policymaker in a de facto military dictatorship that dominated Germany for the rest of the First World War.
