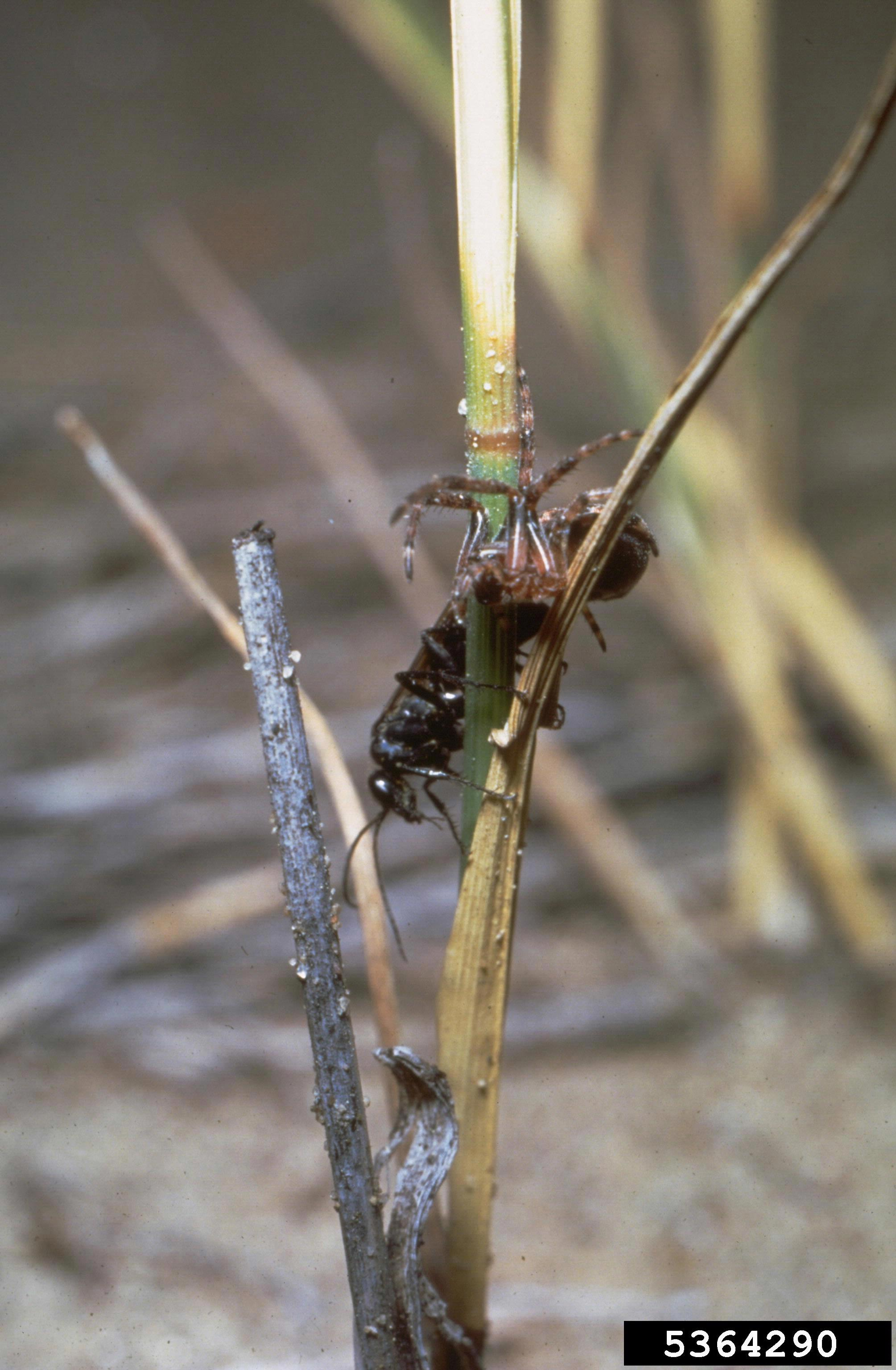

Scientific classification
- Domain: Eukaryota
- Kingdom: Animalia
- Phylum: Arthropoda
- Class: Insecta
- Order: Hymenoptera
- Family: Pompilidae
- Genus: Episyron
- Species: E. quinquenotatus

Binomial name
- Episyron quinquenotatus (Say 1835)

= Episyron quinquenotatus =

Species of wasp

Episyron quinquenotatus is a North American species of pompilid spider hunting wasp.

== Description ==
The body length is approximately 10 mm.

== Distribution ==
From Yukon and Northwest Territories south to the Gulf of Mexico states such as Texas, Arkansas and Alabama.

== Subspecies ==
- E. q. quinquenotatus in the eastern part of the range
- E. q. hurdi in the western part of the range

== Habitat ==
Sandy, open areas, often by waterbodies.

== Habits ==
Grubs which hatch too late in the season to mature will often go into diapause over the winter.
