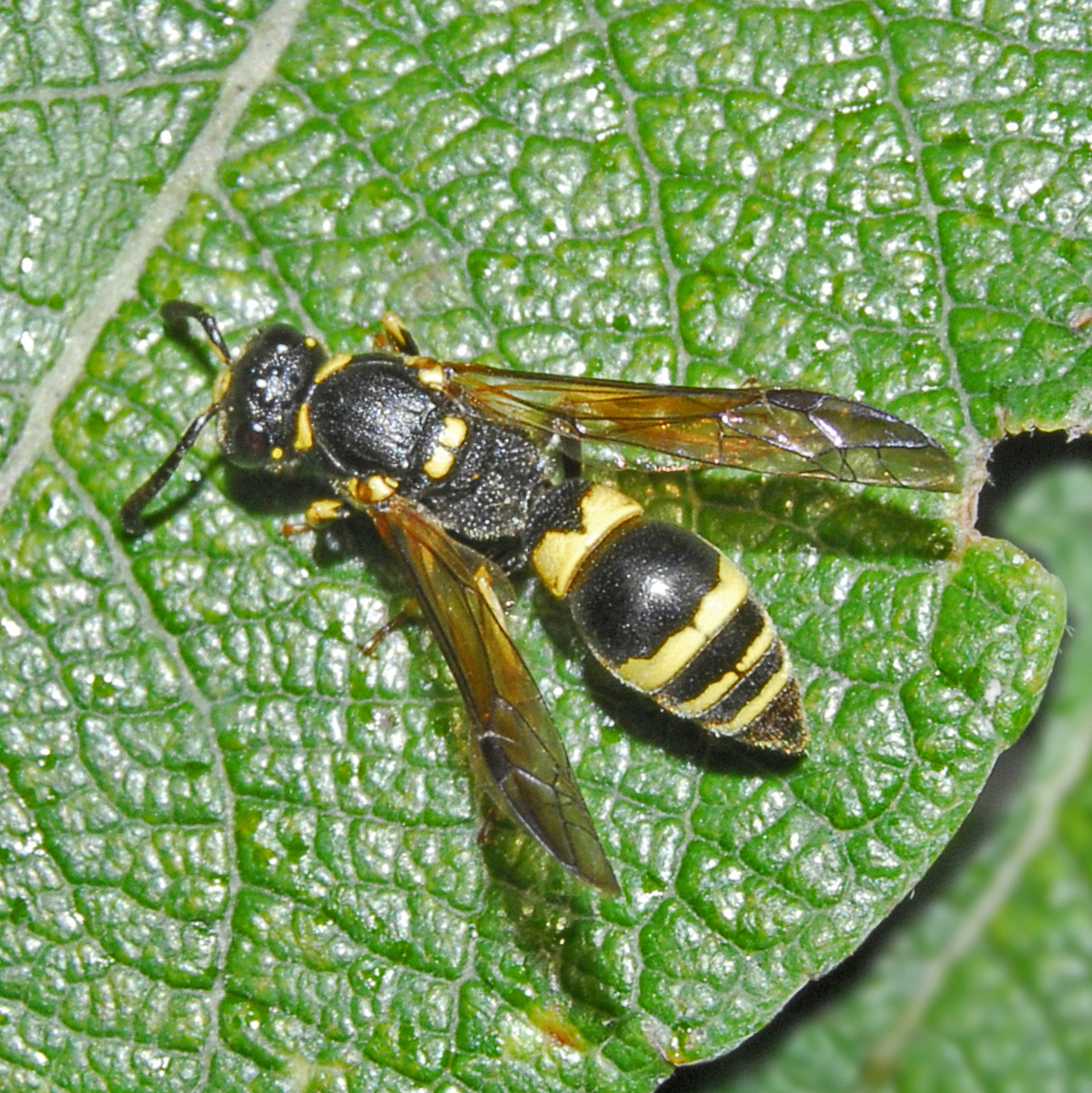
- Symmorphus gracilis

Scientific classification
- Domain: Eukaryota
- Kingdom: Animalia
- Phylum: Arthropoda
- Class: Insecta
- Order: Hymenoptera
- Family: Vespidae
- Subfamily: Eumeninae
- Genus: Symmorphus; Wesmael, 1836

Type species
- Symmorphus gracilis (Brullé 1832) originally Odynerus elegans Westmael, 1833

Species
- See text

= Symmorphus =

Genus of wasps

Symmorphus is a primarily holarctic genus of potter wasps. It is within the family Vespidae.

== Species ==
- Symmorphus albomarginatus
- Symmorphus alkimus
- Symmorphus allobrogus
- Symmorphus ambotretus
- Symmorphus angustatus
- Symmorphus apiciornatus
- Symmorphus aurantiopictus
- Symmorphus bifasciatus
- Symmorphus canadensis
- Symmorphus canlaonicus
- Symmorphus captivus
- Symmorphus carinatus
- Symmorphus cliens
- Symmorphus connexus
- Symmorphus crassicornis
- Symmorphus cristatus
- Symmorphus debilitatus
- Symmorphus decens
- Symmorphus declivis
- Symmorphus foveolatus
- Symmorphus fuscipes
- Symmorphus glasunowi
- Symmorphus gracilis
- Symmorphus hoozanensis
- Symmorphus incisus
- Symmorphus iwatai
- Symmorphus jucundus
- Symmorphus lucens
- Symmorphus mizuhonis
- Symmorphus momunganensis
- Symmorphus murarius
- Symmorphus negrosensis
- Symmorphus nipteroides
- Symmorphus ornatus
- Symmorphus palawanensis
- Symmorphus paralleliventris
- Symmorphus parvilineatus
- Symmorphus projectus
- Symmorphus sichuanensis
- Symmorphus sublaevis
- Symmorphus tsushimanus
- Symmorphus tukvarensis
- Symmorphus violaceipennis
- Symmorphus yananensis
- Symmorphus yunnanensis

== Distribution ==
Many species within this genus are present in most of Europe, in East Palearctic realm, in the Near East and in the Oriental realm. Three species are found in North America.

== Description ==
These small solitary wasp can reach a length of about 2 centimetres (0.79 in). They nest in pre-existing cavities (twigs, stems, galls, old nests of other Hymenoptera, hollows in the wood). Partitions between cells are made of mud. Adult females prey on caterpillars and larvae of beetles to lay eggs in them.

== Bibliography ==
- Carpenter, J. M. 1986. A synonymic generic checklist of the Eumeninae (Hymenoptera: Vespidae). Psyche, 93: 61–90.
