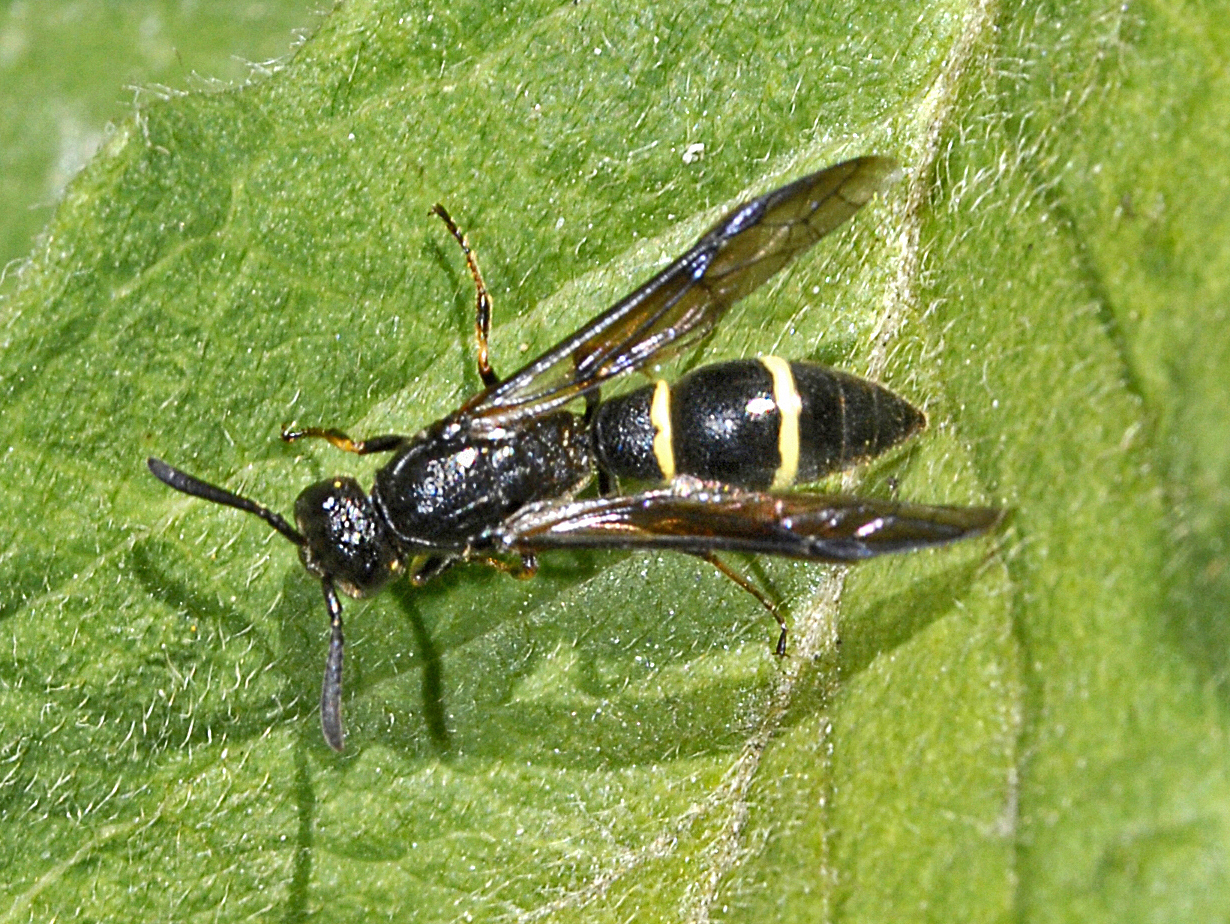
- Symmorphus allobrogus

Scientific classification
- Kingdom: Animalia
- Phylum: Arthropoda
- Clade: Pancrustacea
- Class: Insecta
- Order: Hymenoptera
- Family: Vespidae
- Genus: Symmorphus
- Species: S. allobrogus

Binomial name
- Symmorphus allobrogus (Saussure, 1855)

= Symmorphus allobrogus =

Species of wasp

Symmorphus allobrogus is a species of potter wasps belonging to the subfamily Eumeninae.

== Distribution ==
Species within this genus are present in most of Europe, in the eastern Palearctic realm, and in the Near East.

== Description ==
These small solitary wasps can reach a length of about 9.5–12 millimetres (0.37–0.47 in) in females, of 7.5–11 millimetres (0.30–0.43 in) in males. They have a black thorax much longer than wide and a long and narrow abdomen with two yellow bands. The 4th abdominal tergite is usually completely black. The main segment of the antennae of males are completely black.

== Biology ==
They nest in pre-existing cavities (twigs, stems, galls, old nests of other Hymenoptera, hollows in the wood). Adult females prey on caterpillars and larvae of beetles (Chrysomelidae, Curculionidae) to lay eggs in them. Adults fly from May to July.
