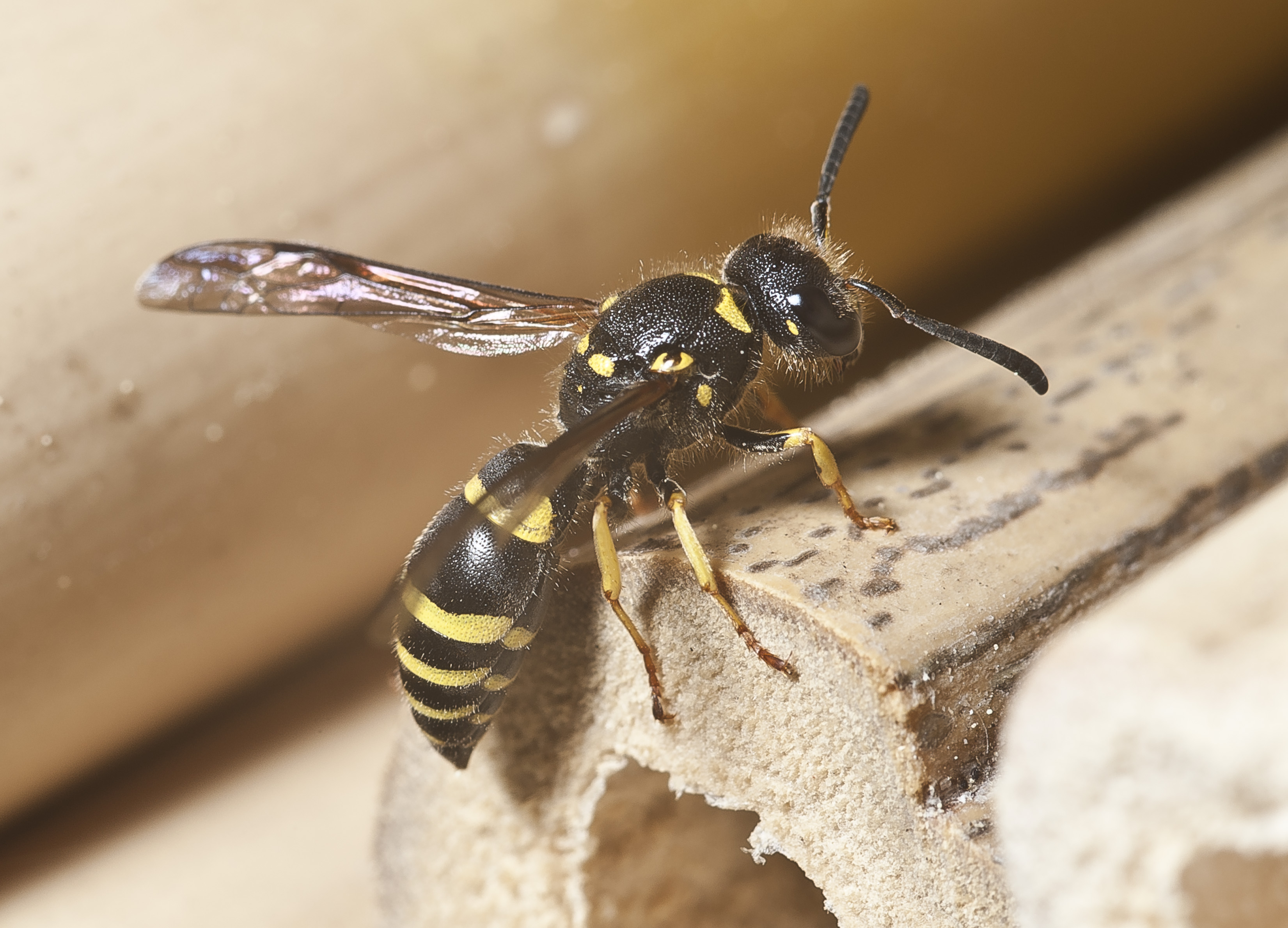

Scientific classification
- Kingdom: Animalia
- Phylum: Arthropoda
- Clade: Pancrustacea
- Class: Insecta
- Order: Hymenoptera
- Family: Vespidae
- Genus: Ancistrocerus
- Species: A. nigricornis

Binomial name
- Ancistrocerus nigricornis (Curtis, 1826)

Synonyms
- Ancistrocerus polonica Blüthgen, 1952; Odynerus callosus Thomson, 1870; Odynerus excisus Thomson, 1870; Vespa sexpunctata Christ, 1791

= Ancistrocerus nigricornis =

Species of wasp

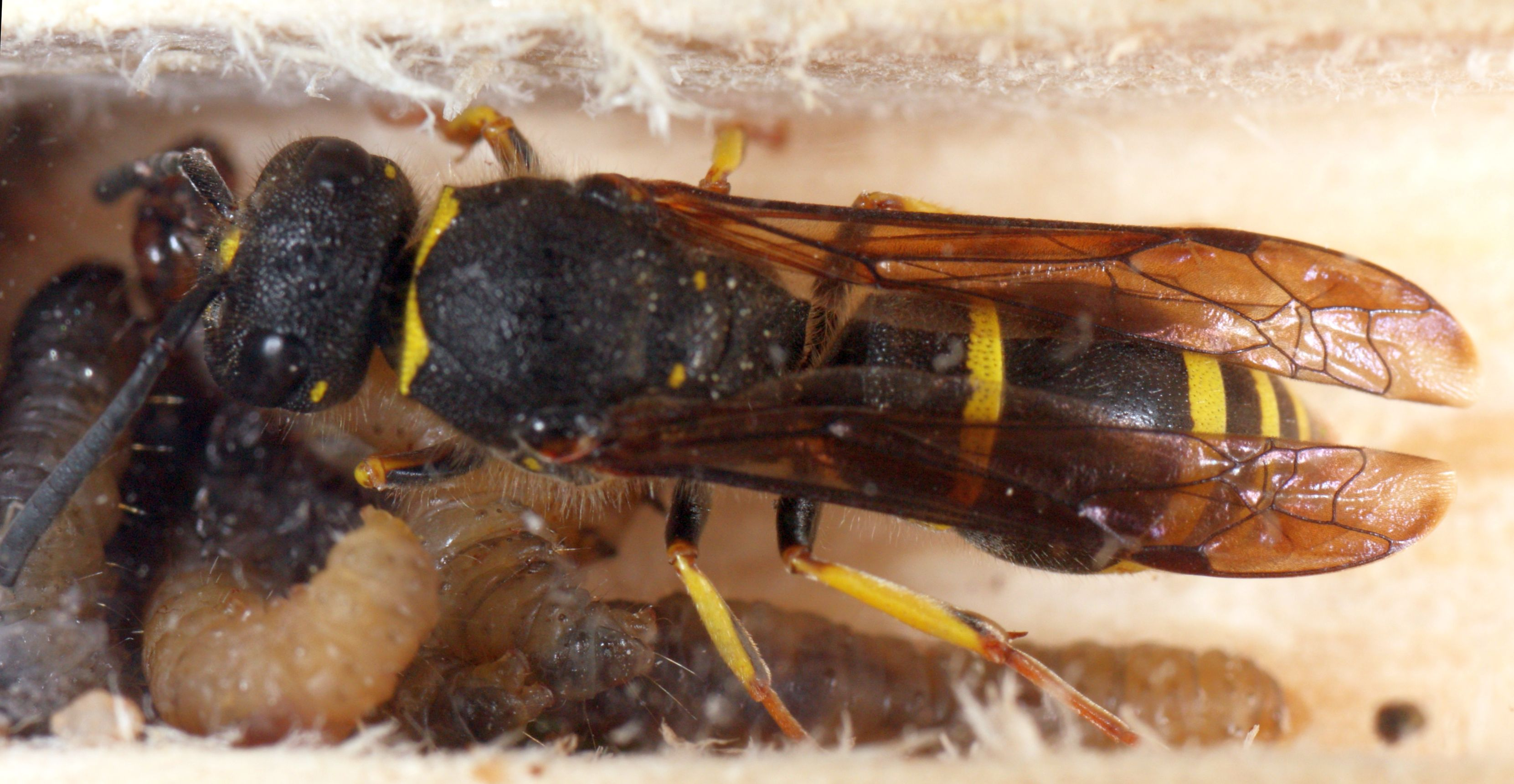
Female Ancistrocerus nigricornis cleans up paralyzed larvae that the children will eat later

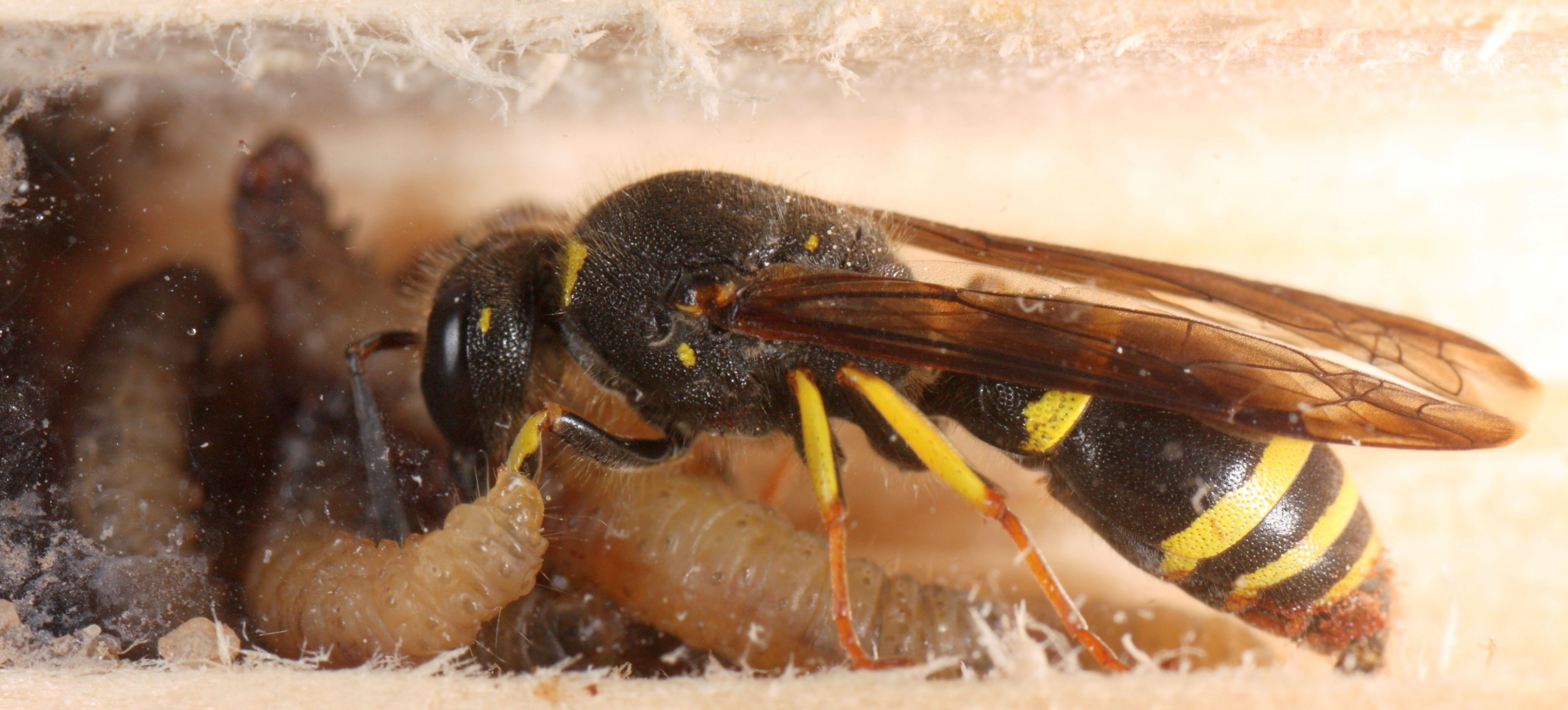
Female Ancistrocerus nigricornis cleans up paralyzed larvae that the children will eat later

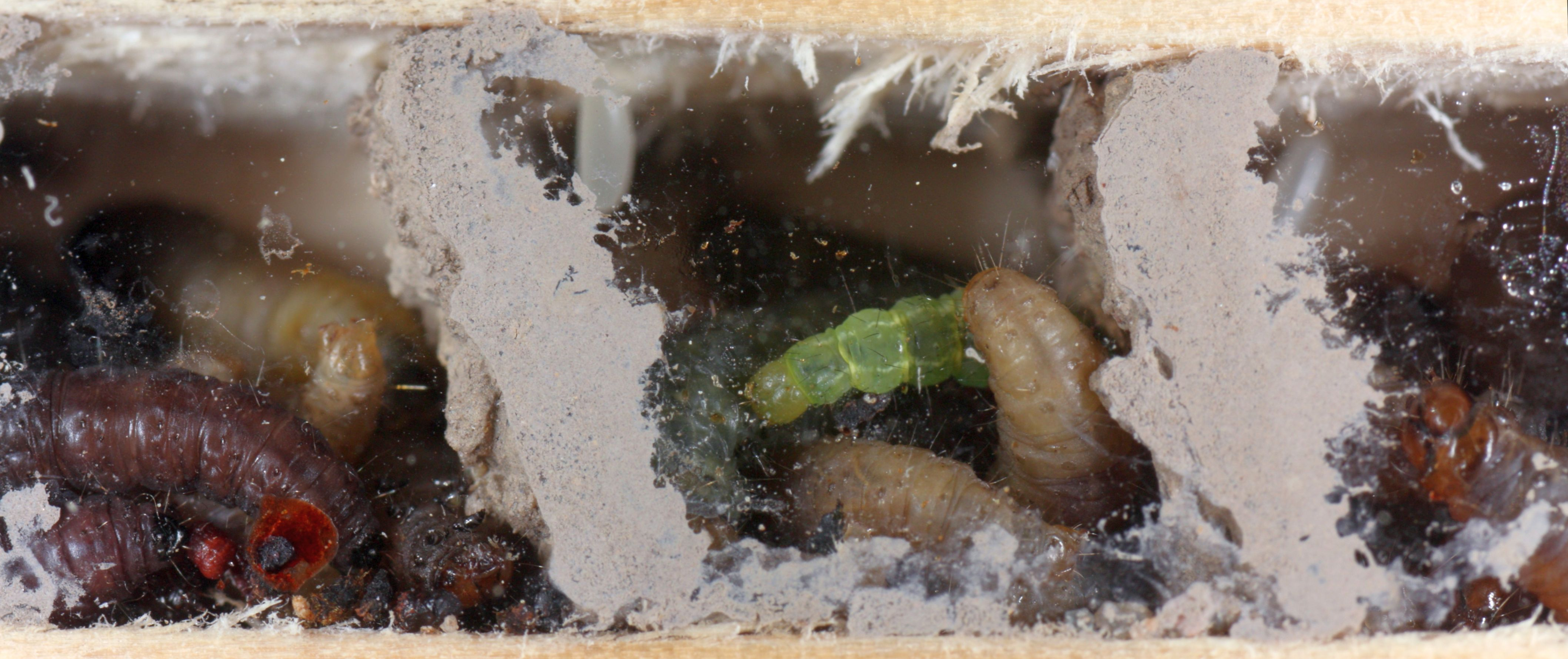
Female Ancistrocerus nigricornis has laid paralyzed larvae in each cell, where the children will eat and later pupate over the winter

Ancistrocerus nigricornis is a species of potter wasp.

== Distribution ==
This species is present in most of Europe and in the eastern Palearctic realm, in the Near East, in North Africa, and in the Oriental realm.

== Habitat ==
These potter wasps live in wet meadows, in open landscapes, sometimes in gardens and in areas where their feeding and preferred nesting sites are present.

== Description ==
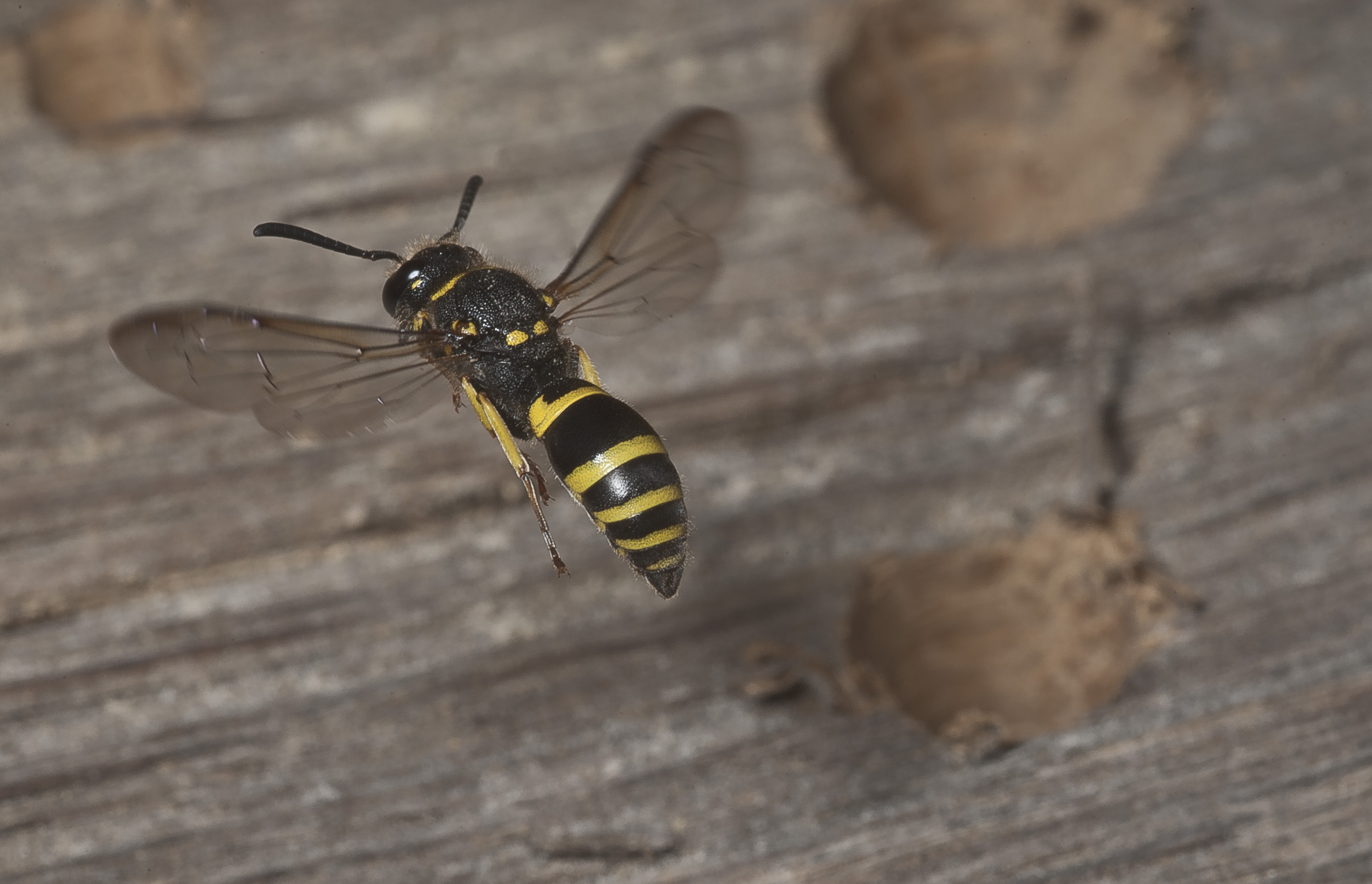
Dorsal view, in flight

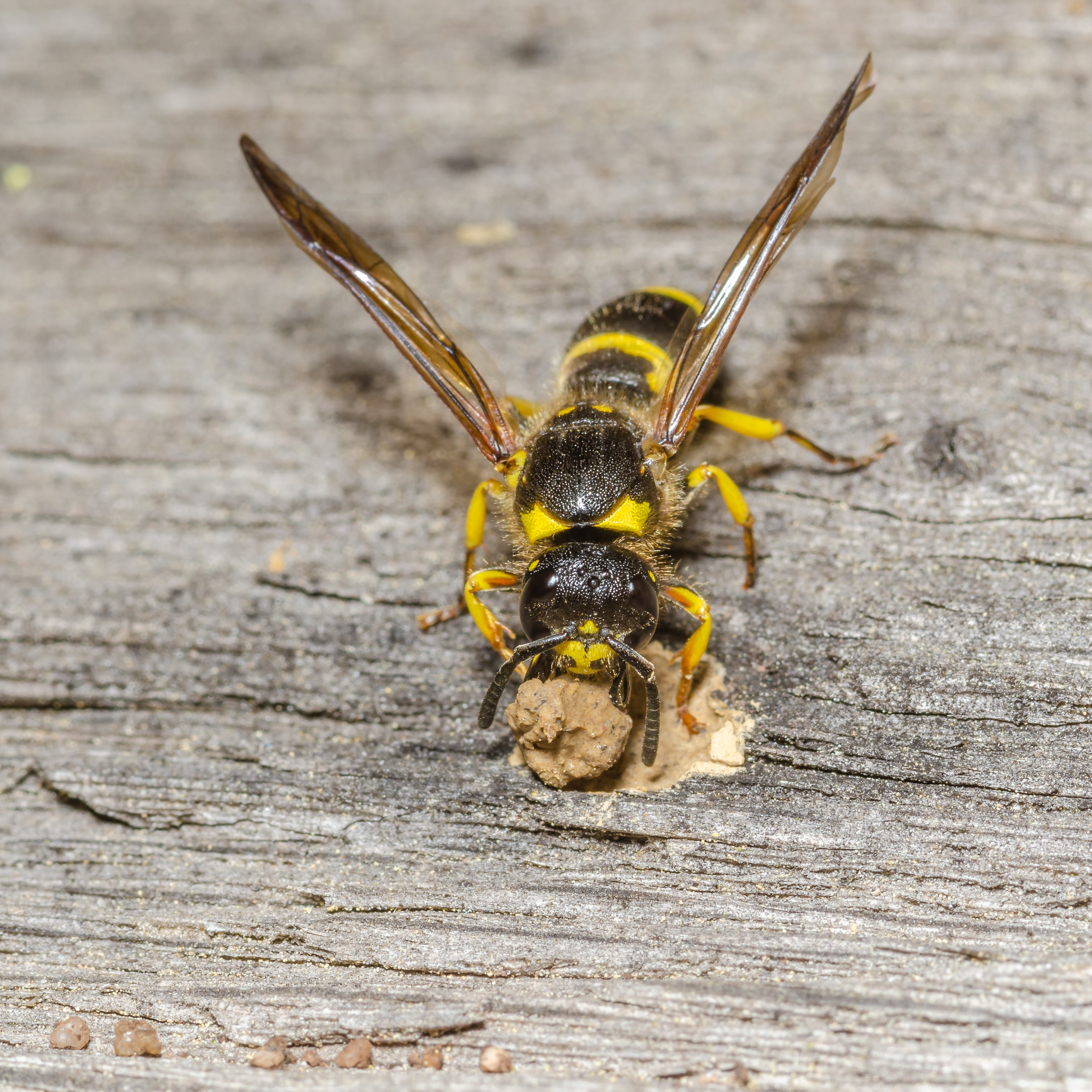
Closing its nest with clay

Ancistrocerus nigricornis can reach a length of 6–10 millimetres (0.24–0.39 in) in males, of 9–13 millimetres (0.35–0.51 in) in females. These medium-sized solitary wasps are yellow and black, with brown hairs on thorax, small spots at the base of the front wings and wing stigma.

Metasomal terga III–IV show apical bands. In the females the spot between antennal socket and eye is absent.

== Biology ==
This species has a single annual generation (univoltine). Adults emerge in late summer. Males can be seen from June until September, while females have been recorded from February to October. After mating the males die and the females overwinter and reappear in the spring. As adults, they eat plant juices, honeydew larvae and nectar of various flowers, mainly wild angelica (Angelica sylvestris), hogweed (Heracleum), blackberry (Rubus fruticosus), nightshades (Solanaceae), goldenrod (Solidago) and thistle.

Nest building occurs during the spring and early summer. These nest consist of holes in wood or tubes, commonly in elder and bramble stems, with clay partitions. These potter wasps lay an egg in each cell where they put various paralysed small caterpillars of micromoths, mainly Tortricidae. When the eggs hatch the larvae consume the prey.

== Bibliography ==
- Antonio Giordani Soika (1970) Boll.Mus.Civ.Stor.nat.Venezia Contributo alla conoscenza degli Eumenidi del Medio Oriente. Missione Giordani Soika in Iran 1965, III., Volume: 20-21 Pages: 27-183
- Horst-Günter Woydak (2001) Natur und Heimat Die solitären Faltenwespen: Eumenidae (Lehmwespen) und Masaridae (Honigwespen im Westfälischen Museum für Naturkunde Münster, Volume: 61 Pages: 85-95
- Michael E. Archer (2002) Yorkshire Naturalists Union The wasps, ants and bees (Hymenoptera: aculeata) of Watsonian Yorkshire, Pages: 1-200
- Michael Kuhlmann (2002) NachrBl.bayer.Ent. Struktur der Wildbienen- und Wespenzönosen ausgewählter Waldstandorte, Volume: 51 Pages: 61-74
- Volker Haeseler (2003) Oldenburger Jb. Ameisen, Wespen und Bienen der Weserinsel Harriersand bei Bremen, Volume: 103 Pages: 333-363
- ZOBODAT: Zoological-Botanical Database (Vespoidea). Gusenleitner J., 2006-07-20
