= Ancistrocerus unifasciatus =

Scientific classification
- Kingdom: Animalia
- Phylum: Arthropoda
- Clade: Pancrustacea
- Class: Insecta
- Order: Hymenoptera
- Family: Vespidae
- Genus: Ancistrocerus
- Species: A. unifasciatus

Binomial name
- Ancistrocerus unifasciatus (de Saussure, 1853)

Species of wasp

Ancistrocerus unifasciatus, also known as the one-banded mason wasp, is a species of mason wasp in the genus Ancistrocerus. It is found in eastern North America.

== Taxonomy ==
Ancistrocerus unifasciatus contains the following subspecies:

- Ancistrocerus unifasciatus unifasciatus
- Ancistrocerus unifasciatus seminole
