= Ancistrocerus catskill =

Scientific classification
- Kingdom: Animalia
- Phylum: Arthropoda
- Clade: Pancrustacea
- Class: Insecta
- Order: Hymenoptera
- Family: Vespidae
- Genus: Ancistrocerus
- Species: A. catskill

Binomial name
- Ancistrocerus catskill (de Saussure, 1853)

Species of wasp

Ancistrocerus catskill ,also known as the Catskill potter wasp, is a species of mason wasp in the genus Ancistrocerus. It is found in eastern North America.

Ancistrocerus catskill contains the following subspecies:

- Ancistrocerus catskill albophaleratus
