= Ancistrocerus capra =

Scientific classification
- Kingdom: Animalia
- Phylum: Arthropoda
- Clade: Pancrustacea
- Class: Insecta
- Order: Hymenoptera
- Family: Vespidae
- Genus: Ancistrocerus
- Species: A. capra

Binomial name
- Ancistrocerus capra (de Saussure, 1857 )

Species of wasp

Ancistrocerus capra, the lobed mason wasp, is a species of mason wasp in the genus Ancistrocerus. It is found in North America.
