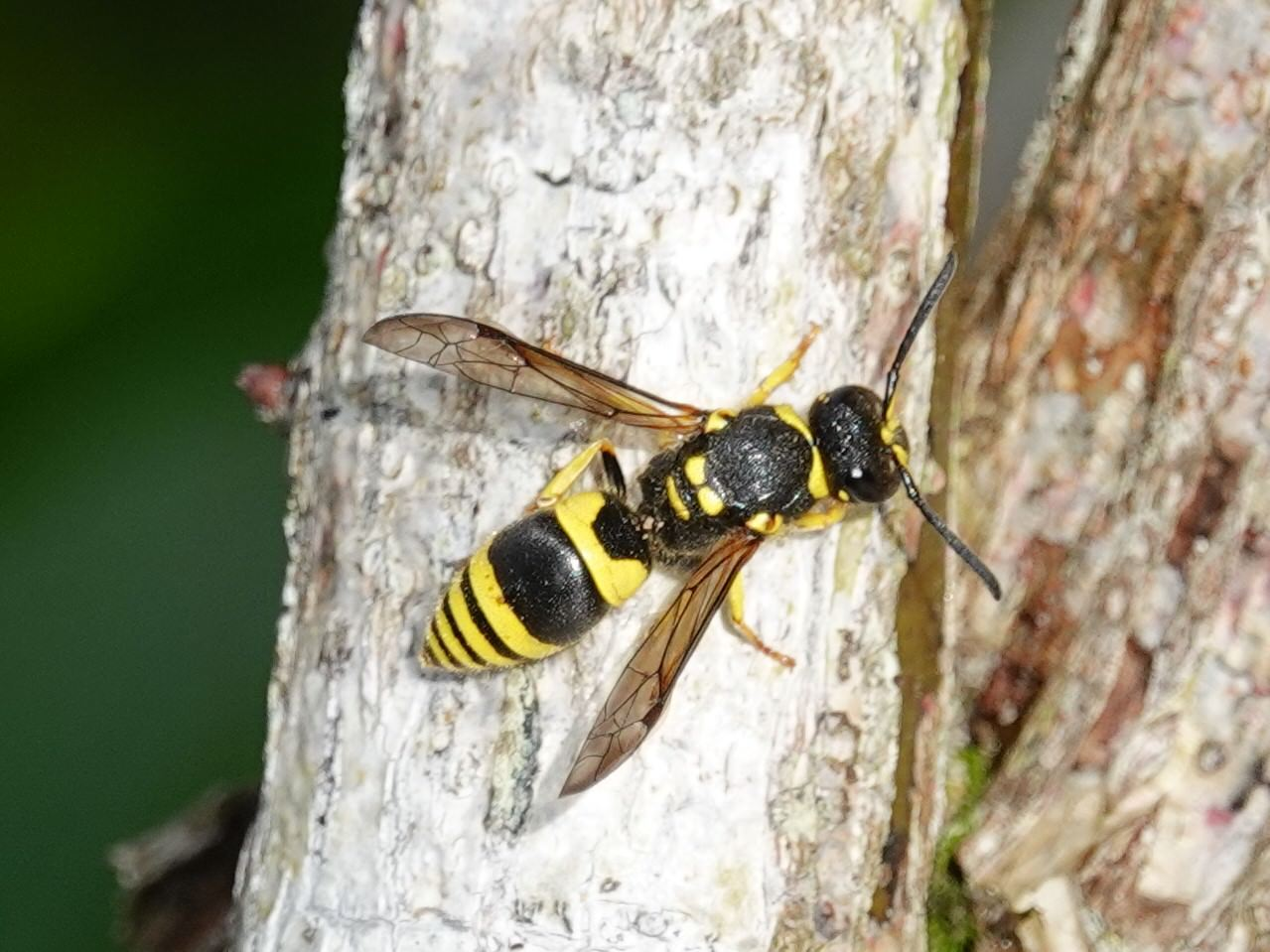
- Cumnor Hill, Oxford

Scientific classification
- Kingdom: Animalia
- Phylum: Arthropoda
- Clade: Pancrustacea
- Class: Insecta
- Order: Hymenoptera
- Family: Vespidae
- Genus: Ancistrocerus
- Species: A. gazella

Binomial name
- Ancistrocerus gazella (Panzer 1798)

= Ancistrocerus gazella =

European potter wasp

Species of wasp

Ancistrocerus gazella, known as the European potter wasp or European tube wasp, is a species of potter wasp. As an imago (adult), the female collects as many as 20 caterpillars for each nest, which consists of a single cell. Her larval offspring then feed on these inside the nest, which is sealed with mud arranged by her. As adults, they eat nectar and aphid honeydew. Males cannot sting, and the sting of a female is not painful. They can be found on windows, foraging for nectar on flowers, or searching out small cracks or holes in which to nest.

== Distribution and habitat ==
This wasp is native to Europe, its range including Norway, Sweden, the Netherlands, France, Spain, Germany, Italy, Poland, Austria, Ukraine, Romania and Bulgaria. In the British Isles it occurs in England, as far north as the Scottish Borders so likely southern Scotland also, in Wales and at scattered locations in Ireland. It also occurs in Morocco. It is found in a variety of habitats where there is suitable sandy and clay soil, such as river banks, coastal areas, parkland, open woodland and urban areas. The species became established in Auckland, New Zealand in 1987, and is now found even in Otago (near the country's southern extremity).

== Ecology ==
In late spring, the wasps emerge from their over-wintering sites and feed on nectar and pollen from such plants as sea-holly, bramble, hogweed and thistles. After mating, the females search for suitable nest sites; these are usually cavities in plants such as hollow stems, pith cavities of dead twigs or the disused tunnels made by wood-boring insects. Inside these tubes, the cells are arranged linearly, with a clay partition between them. The female lays an egg in the first cell and then stocks it with several paralysed caterpillars, before sealing it with a clay plug. Further cells are made in a similar manner. Each wasp egg hatches in a few days and the larva takes ten or twelve days to consume its supply of caterpillars. After a short rest, or an extended period of diapause, depending on the time of year, the larva spins a cocoon and the adult emerges about a fortnight later. It moistens the clay plug to soften it before emerging into the open.
