= Alastorynerus wolffi =

Scientific classification
- Kingdom: Animalia
- Phylum: Arthropoda
- Clade: Pancrustacea
- Class: Insecta
- Order: Hymenoptera
- Family: Vespidae
- Genus: Alastorynerus
- Species: A. wolffi

Binomial name
- Alastorynerus wolffi Giordani Soika, 1974

Species of wasp

Alastorynerus wolffi is a species of wasp in the family Vespidae.
