= Ancistrocerus oviventris =

Scientific classification
- Kingdom: Animalia
- Phylum: Arthropoda
- Clade: Pancrustacea
- Class: Insecta
- Order: Hymenoptera
- Family: Vespidae
- Subfamily: Eumeninae
- Genus: Ancistrocerus
- Species: A. oviventris

Binomial name
- Ancistrocerus oviventris (Wesmael, 1836)

Species of wasp

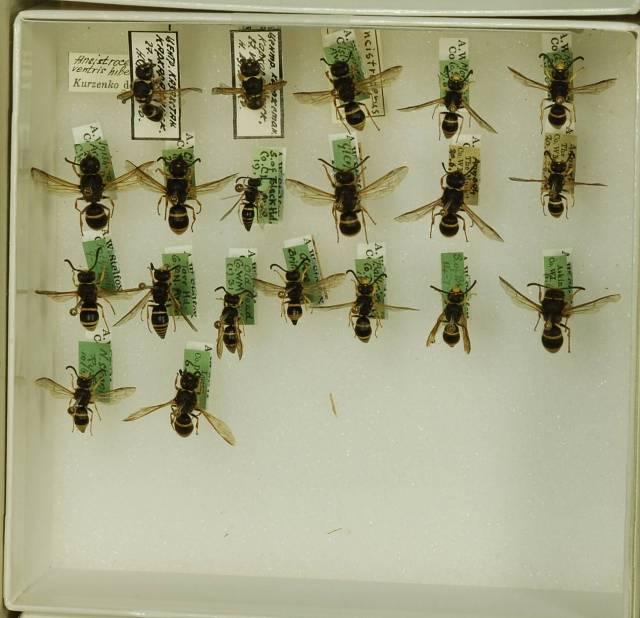
Ancistrocerus oviventris hibernicus

Ancistrocerus oviventris is a Palearctic species of potter wasp.
