= Cephalochilus draco =

Scientific classification
- Kingdom: Animalia
- Phylum: Arthropoda
- Class: Insecta
- Order: Hymenoptera
- Family: Vespidae
- Genus: Cephalochilus
- Species: C. draco

Binomial name
- Cephalochilus draco Giordani Soika, 1970

Species of wasp

Cephalochilus draco is a species of potter wasp of the family Vespidae.

== Distribution ==
Cephalochilus draco has been recorded in Turkey.
