= Gymnomerus =

Scientific classification
- Kingdom: Animalia
- Phylum: Arthropoda
- Clade: Pancrustacea
- Class: Insecta
- Order: Hymenoptera
- Family: Vespidae
- Genus: Gymnomerus; Blüthgen, 1938
- Species: G. laevipes

Binomial name
- Gymnomerus laevipes (Shuckard, 1837)

Synonyms
- Odynerus laevipes Shuckard, 1837

Genus of wasps

Gymnomerus is a monotypic Palearctic genus of potter wasps. The sole species is Gymnomerus laevipes.
