= Alastorynerus perezi =

Scientific classification
- Kingdom: Animalia
- Phylum: Arthropoda
- Clade: Pancrustacea
- Class: Insecta
- Order: Hymenoptera
- Family: Vespidae
- Genus: Alastorynerus
- Species: A. perezi

Binomial name
- Alastorynerus perezi (Berland, 1927)

Species of wasp

Alastorynerus perezi is a species of wasp in the family Vespidae.
