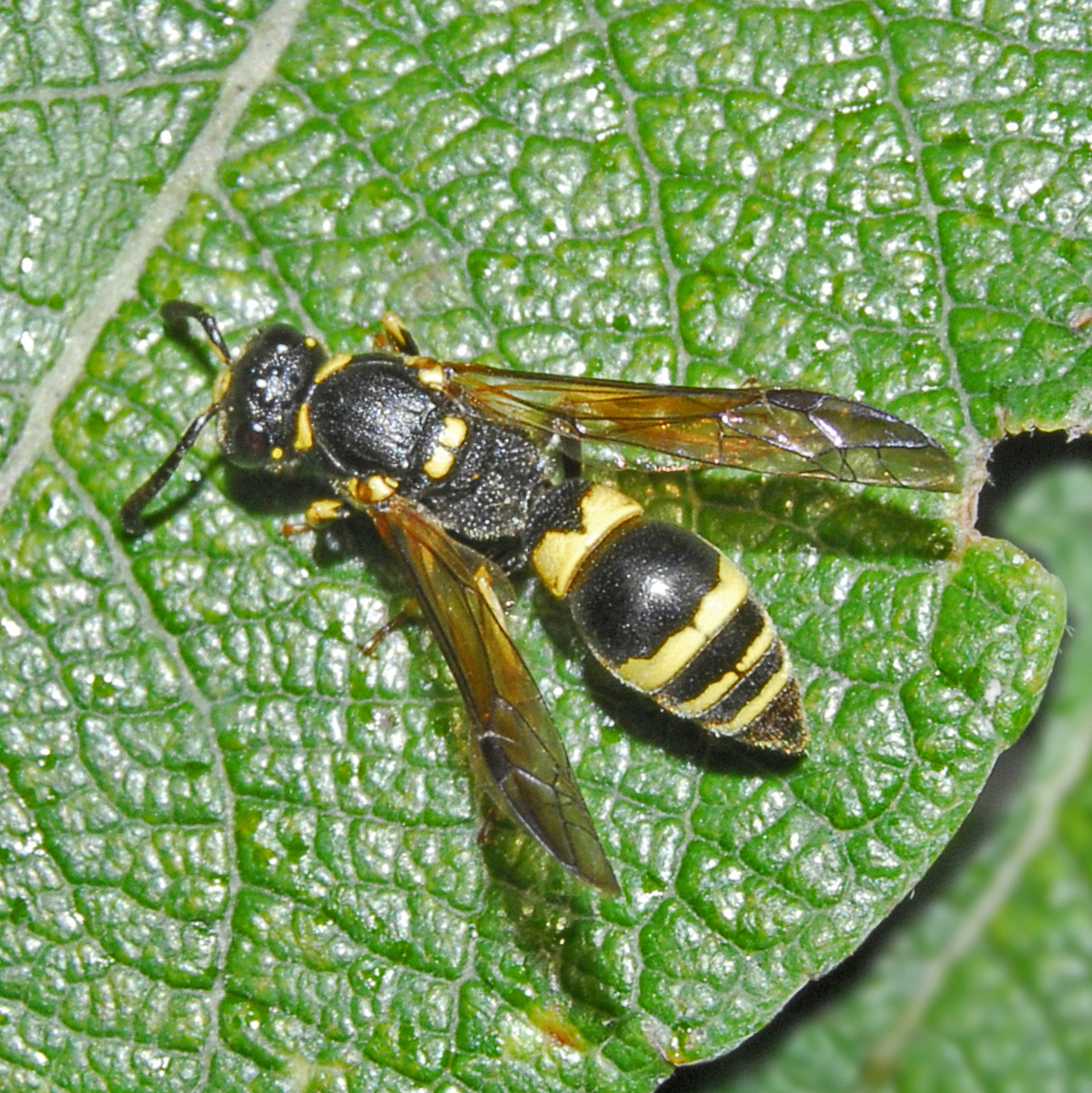
- Symmorphus gracilis. Dorsal view

Scientific classification
- Kingdom: Animalia
- Phylum: Arthropoda
- Clade: Pancrustacea
- Class: Insecta
- Order: Hymenoptera
- Family: Vespidae
- Genus: Symmorphus
- Species: S. gracilis

Binomial name
- Symmorphus gracilis (Brullé, 1832)

Synonyms
- Odynerus elegans Wesmael, 1833

= Symmorphus gracilis =

Species of wasp

Symmorphus gracilis is a species of tube-nesting wasps.

== Subspecies ==
Subspecies include:

- Symmorphus gracilis gracilis (Brullé, 1832)
- Symmorphus gracilis libanicus Giordani Soika, 1963

== Distribution and habitat ==
This rather common species is present in most of Europe and in the eastern Palearctic realm. These wasps mainly inhabit meadows, hedge rows, damp places close to streams, and man-made environments.

== Description ==
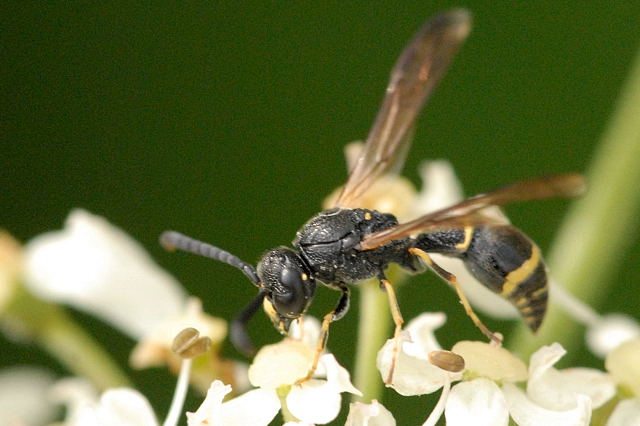
Side view

Adults of Symmorphus gracilis can reach a length of 7–10 millimetres (0.28–0.39 in) in males, of 8–12 millimetres (0.31–0.47 in) in females. These slender tube-nesting wasps have a black head and furrows on the black thorax. On T1 there are a transverse hull and a median longitudinal groove. The small scales at the base of the forewings are black with a yellow border. Antennae of the males are straight up to the end. In the females there are dimples behind the posterior ocelli.

== Biology ==
Adults can be found from June to August. They made their nest in a variety of locations, mainly in hollow stems, e.g. bramble and elder, but also in cavities in walls and disused plant galls. In these existing cavities the females makes several cells, divided by clay. Larvae feed on insects stored by adults, mainly larvae of a chrysomelid beetle (Chrysomela populi) and of a figwort weevil (Cionus hortulanus).

== Bibliography ==
- Antonio Giordani Soika (1970) Boll.Mus.Civ.Stor.nat.Venezia Contributo alla conoscenza degli Eumenidi del Medio Oriente. Missione Giordani Soika in Iran 1965, III., Volume: 20–21
- Horst-Günter Woydak (2001) Natur und Heimat Die solitären Faltenwespen: Eumenidae (Lehmwespen) und Masaridae (Honigwespen im Westfälischen Museum für Naturkunde Münster, Volume: 61
- Michael E. Archer (2002) Yorkshire Naturalists Union The wasps, ants and bees (Hymenoptera: aculeata) of Watsonian Yorkshire
