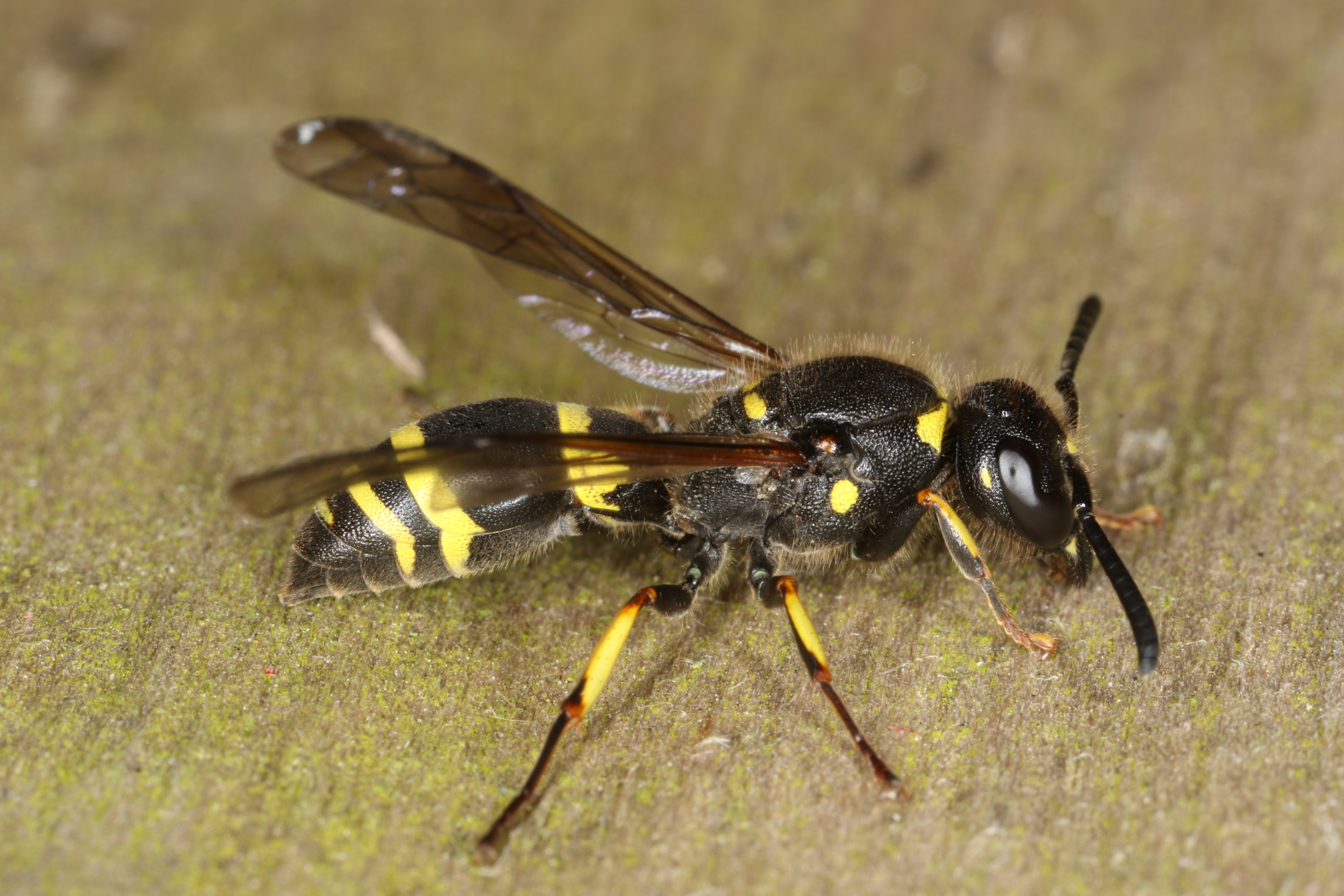

Scientific classification
- Domain: Eukaryota
- Kingdom: Animalia
- Phylum: Arthropoda
- Class: Insecta
- Order: Hymenoptera
- Family: Vespidae
- Subfamily: Eumeninae
- Genus: Ancistrocerus
- Species: A. trifasciatus

Binomial name
- Ancistrocerus trifasciatus (Muller, 1776)

Synonyms
- Ancistrocerus moeschleri Blüthgen, 1938; Odynerus tricinctus Herrich-Schäffer, 1839; Odynerus trimarginatus Zetterstedt, 1838

= Ancistrocerus trifasciatus =

Species of wasp

Ancistrocerus trifasciatus is a Palearctic species of potter wasp.
