= Ancistroceroides =

Scientific classification
- Domain: Eukaryota
- Kingdom: Animalia
- Phylum: Arthropoda
- Class: Insecta
- Order: Hymenoptera
- Family: Vespidae
- Subfamily: Eumeninae
- Genus: Ancistroceroides; Saussure, 1855

Species
- see text

Genus of wasps

Ancistroceroides is a neotropical and nearctic genus of potter wasps.

== Species ==
- Ancistroceroides acuminatus
- Ancistroceroides alastoroides
- Ancistroceroides ambiguus
- Ancistroceroides atripes
- Ancistroceroides bogotanus
- Ancistroceroides conjunctus
- Ancistroceroides cordatus
- Ancistroceroides cruentus
- Ancistroceroides domingensis
- Ancistroceroides erythraeus
- Ancistroceroides fabienii
- Ancistroceroides fulvimaculatus
- Ancistroceroides gribodoi
- Ancistroceroides latro
- Ancistroceroides mearimensis
- Ancistroceroides rufimaculatus
- Ancistroceroides rufus
- Ancistroceroides venustus
- Ancistroceroides vicinus
