= Episyron gallicum =

Scientific classification
- Kingdom: Animalia
- Phylum: Arthropoda
- Class: Insecta
- Order: Hymenoptera
- Family: Pompilidae
- Genus: Episyron
- Species: E. gallicum

Binomial name
- Episyron gallicum Tournier, 1889

Synonyms
- Episyron intermedius Haupt, 1930; Episyron tertius Bluthgen, 1944; Pompilus gallicum Tournier, 1889

Species of wasp

Episyron gallicum is a spider-eating wasp which, as its specific name suggests, has a distribution centred on France.

== Habits ==
It hunts terrestrial spiders which hunt their prey such as Wolf spiders as opposed to web weaving spiders. The spider is paralysed with a sting and then the helpless spider is sealed in a tunnel and the wasp lays an egg on it. The grub dines on the living spider when it hatches.

== Habitat ==
Open terrain with loose sandy soil.

== Distribution ==
Southern Europe but has recently expanded its range into Poland, Germany and the United Kingdom.
