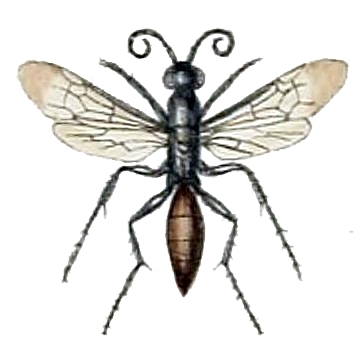

Scientific classification
- Kingdom: Animalia
- Phylum: Arthropoda
- Clade: Pancrustacea
- Class: Insecta
- Order: Hymenoptera
- Family: Pompilidae
- Genus: Aporus
- Species: A. unicolor

Binomial name
- Aporus unicolor Spinola, 1808

Synonyms
- Aporus femoralis

= Aporus unicolor =

Species of wasp

Aporus unicolor, common name cutpurse, is a highly specialised spider hunting wasp from the family Pompilidae.

== Description ==
Spinola originally described two species, A. unicolor and A. bicolor, but these were later determined to be conspecific, male and female respectively. Both sexes are largely bluish black with dusky wings, but the male has a reddish-brown abdomen with a black tip. The female is about 10 mm in length.

== Biology ==
Aporus unicolor is a specialised hunter with only one recorded prey, the purse-web spider Atypus affinis. The female A. affinis can live for up to eight years in its subterranean silky tubular web, to which A. unicolor gains access by using its specialised enlarged fore-femur. Once inside, the wasp paralyses the spider with its sting, lays an egg on her and promptly leaves the sac in which her larva will develop by eating the spider.

The adult wasps feed on the nectar of umbellifers such as wild carrot, wild parsnip and rock samphire.

== Habitat ==
The majority of modern records of A. unicolor within Great Britain are coastal, with a decline in inland records probably attributable to habitat loss. On the coast, the habitat is typically cliffs and landslips, while inland the habitat is well-grazed downland and heathland. The species appears to be thermophilic and shows a strong preference for south-facing slopes and banks in sunny locations.

== Distribution ==
In Great Britain, A unicolor is confined to southern England, from Cornwall in the west to Kent in the east and north to Cambridgeshire, with recent records in South Wales and the Channel Islands. In mainland Europe, A. unicolor has been recorded in western and central Europe east to Hungary and south as far as northern Italy.

== Common name ==
The common name cutpurse is a neologism which was the winner of a prize to name a species in The Guardian in 2012.
