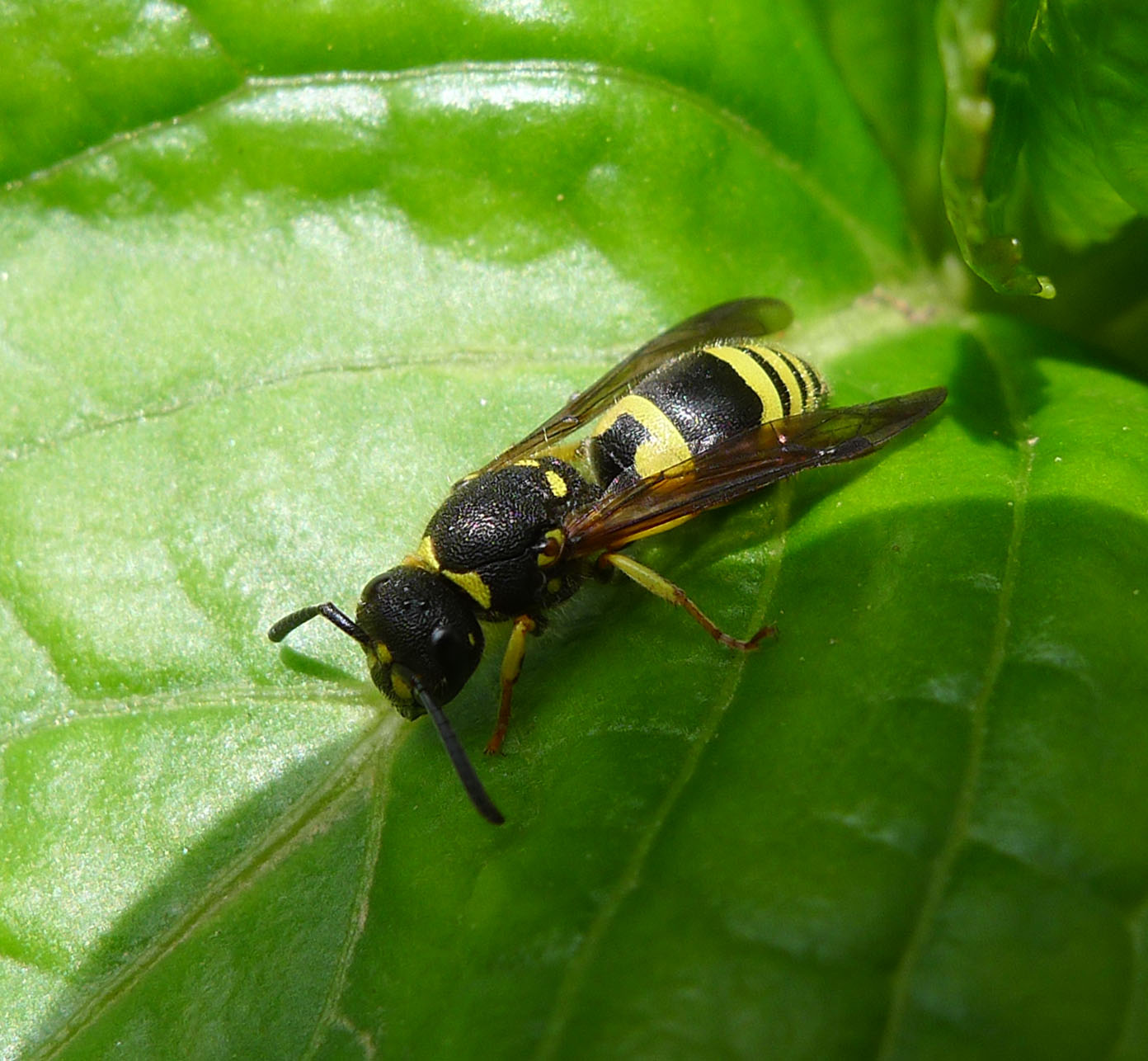

Scientific classification
- Kingdom: Animalia
- Phylum: Arthropoda
- Class: Insecta
- Order: Hymenoptera
- Family: Vespidae
- Subfamily: Eumeninae
- Genus: Ancistrocerus
- Species: A. parietinus

Binomial name
- Ancistrocerus parietinus (Linnaeus, 1761)

= Ancistrocerus parietinus =

Species of wasp

Ancistrocerus parietinus is a Palearctic species of potter wasp.
