= Sea holly =

Sea holly is a common name for several plants and may refer to:

- Acanthus ebracteatus
- Eryngium species, especially:
  - Eryngium maritimum
