= Orancistrocerus =

Scientific classification
- Domain: Eukaryota
- Kingdom: Animalia
- Phylum: Arthropoda
- Class: Insecta
- Order: Hymenoptera
- Family: Vespidae
- Subfamily: Eumeninae
- Genus: Orancistrocerus; Vecht, 1963

Type species
- Orancistrocerus drewseni (de Saussure, 1857)

Species
- Orancistrocerus aterrimus (de Saussure, 1852); Orancistrocerus bicoloripennis (Gribodo, 1891); Orancistrocerus drewseni (de Saussure, 1857); Orancistrocerus moelleri (Bingham, 1897)

Genus of wasps

Orancistrocerus is a small genus of potter wasps which has species recorded from the Far East and northern South America and southern Central America.
