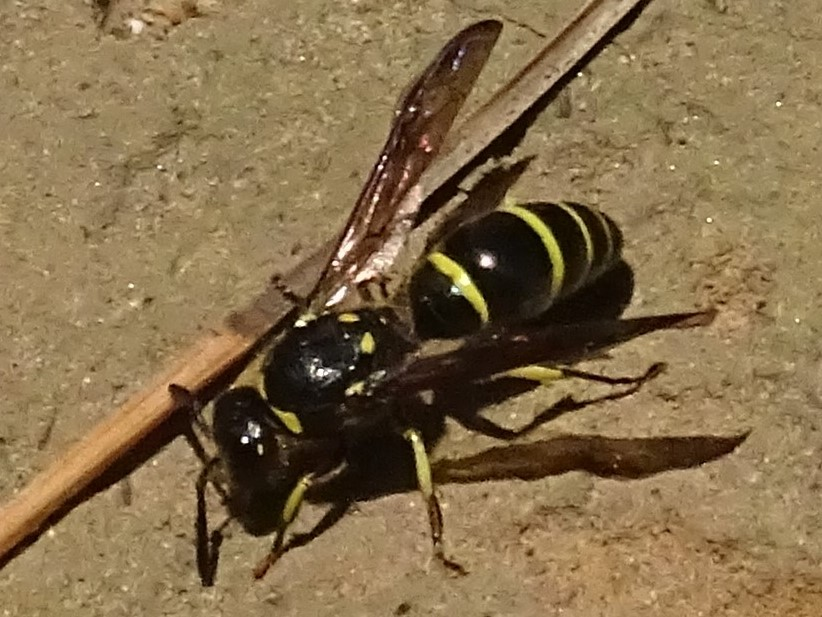
- Photographed in Ottawa, Canada in 2019

Scientific classification
- Domain: Eukaryota
- Kingdom: Animalia
- Phylum: Arthropoda
- Class: Insecta
- Order: Hymenoptera
- Family: Vespidae
- Genus: Ancistrocerus
- Species: A. antilope

Binomial name
- Ancistrocerus antilope Panzer 1798

= Ancistrocerus antilope =

Species of wasp

Ancistrocerus antilope is a species of wasp of the family Vespidae.

== Description ==
This species is similar to the rarer A. spinolae, with differences including a shining, impunctate propodeum and a pair of yellow spots on the female's scutellum.

== Range ==
Ancistrocerus antilope is present in all Canadian provinces and all continental U.S. states except Alaska, Alabama, and Florida, as well as Europe to Siberia.

== Ecology ==
A. antilope is known to nest in hollow twigs, similar to many Megachilid bees, and the parasite Leucospis affinis has been found in the nests of A. antilope. Whether the parasites can successfully complete their life cycle using the wasp as a host in unknown.
