= Tachyancistrocerus =

Scientific classification
- Domain: Eukaryota
- Kingdom: Animalia
- Phylum: Arthropoda
- Class: Insecta
- Order: Hymenoptera
- Family: Vespidae
- Subfamily: Eumeninae
- Genus: Tachyancistrocerus; Giordani Soika, 1952

Type species
- Tachyancistrocerus rhodensis (Saussure 1855)

Species
- Tachyancistrocerus aereus Giordani Soika, 1951; Tachyancistrocerus antiquus Giordani Soika, 1970; Tachyancistrocerus cyprius (Pittioni, 1950); Tachyancistrocerus komarowi (Morawitz, 1885); Tachyancistrocerus kostylevi Kurzenko, 1984; Tachyancistrocerus pallidenotatus Giordani Soika, 1970; Tachyancistrocerus pakistanus Gusenleitner, 2006; Tachyancistrocerus quabosi Giordani Soika, 1979; Tachyancistrocerus rhodensis (Saussure 1855); Tachyancistrocerus schmidti (Kok., 1912); Tachyancistrocerus serenus (Giordani Soika, 1935); Tachyancistrocerus syriacus Giordani Soika, 1970

Genus of wasps

Tachyancistrocerus is an indomalayan, afrotropical and palearctic genus of potter wasps.
