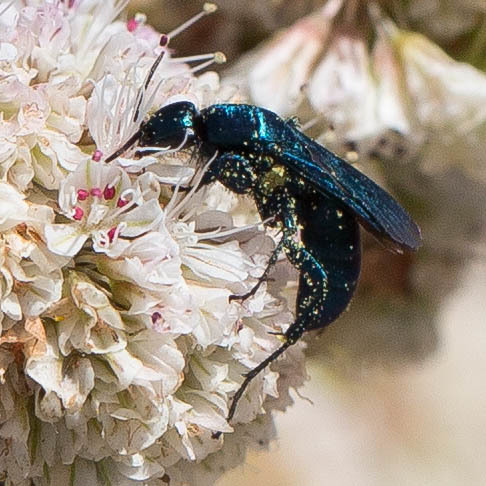
- Aporus hirsutus, California

Scientific classification
- Kingdom: Animalia
- Phylum: Arthropoda
- Class: Insecta
- Order: Hymenoptera
- Family: Pompilidae
- Genus: Aporus; Spinola, 1808

Type species
- Aporus bicolor Spinola, 1808

= Aporus =

Genus of wasps

Aporus is a genus of spider wasps from the family Pompilidae, they specialise in hunting ground dwelling spiders in their burrows for laying eggs on.

Species within Aporus include

- Aporus andradei Wolf, 1970
- Aporus apicatus Banks 1910
- Aporus bicolor Spinola, 1808
- Aporus concolor (Smith, 1860)
- Aporus cuzco Evans, 1973
- Aporus hirsutus (Banks, 1917)
- Aourus idris (Cameron, 1867)
- Aporus japonicus Yasumatsu & Torikata 1934
- Aporus luxus (Banks, 1914)
- Aporus niger Cresson 1897
- Aporus pollux (Kohl, 1888)
- Aporus unicolor Spinola, 1808
