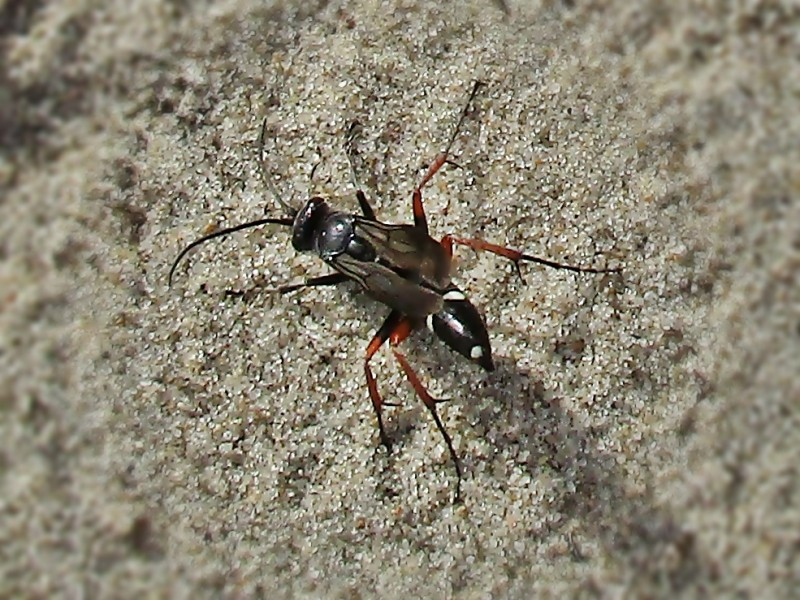
- Episyron rufipes (Pompilidae sp.), Texel, the Netherlands
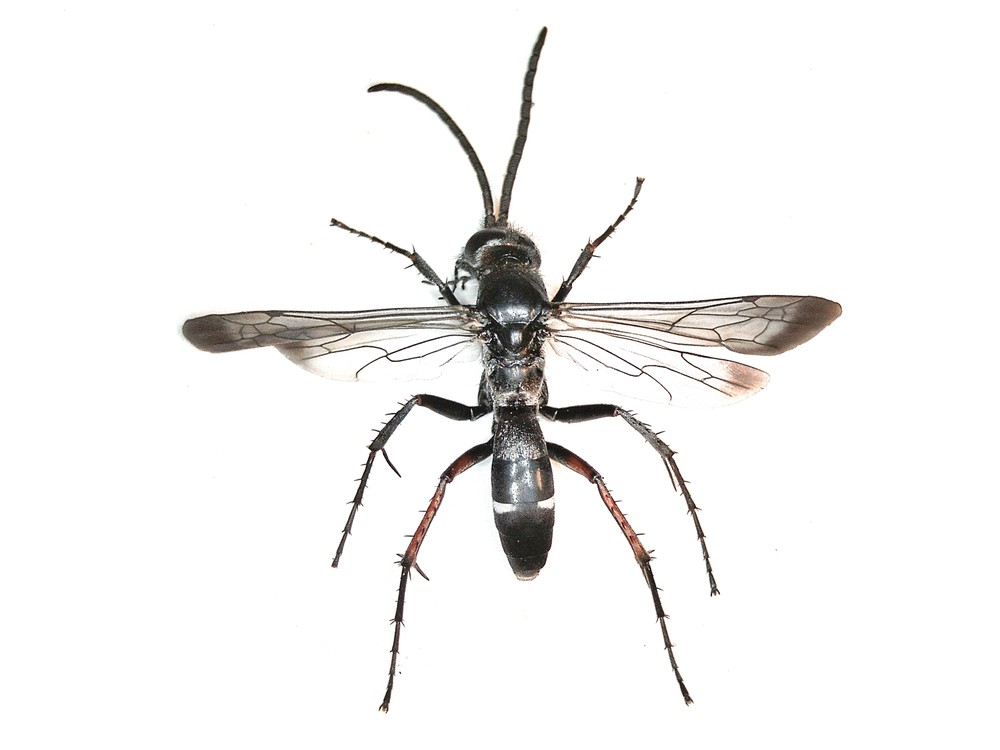

Scientific classification
- Kingdom: Animalia
- Phylum: Arthropoda
- Class: Insecta
- Order: Hymenoptera
- Family: Pompilidae
- Genus: Episyron
- Species: E. rufipes

Binomial name
- Episyron rufipes (Linnaeus, 1758)

Synonyms
- Sphex rufipes Linnaeus, 1758

= Episyron rufipes =

Species of wasp

Episyron rufipes, the red-legged spider wasp, is a red and black or completely black spider-hunting wasp.

== Description ==
8–12.5 mm in length. Adults are mainly black with white spots on the abdomen with the two rear legs having the middle leg, tibia and femur coloured red.

== Habitat ==
Associated with dry sandy habitats such as coastal dunes, landslips and grasslands; as well as inland heathlands (e.g. Breckland), gravel pits and gardens on sandy soils.

== Biology ==
Excavates burrows in loose sandy soil using specialised tarsal combs often in aggregations of burrows created by females. The burrows are usually stocked with orb-spiders, mainly Meta and Araneus spp. although Lycosidae may also be predated. The prey are temporarily hung on a nearby plant whilst the burrow is dug. Some females steal the prey captured by its neighbour and females will even fight for the possession of another female's prey, i.e. kleptoparasitism. Eventually some females learn to steal the spiders in the burrow, either by driving away the rightful owner while she was sealing up the burrow, or by hunting through the soil around the aggregated burrows to find sealed burrows.

In Britain the flight period of adults is June to August.

Both sexes of Episyron rufipes are often seen visiting the flowers of umbellifers for nectar.

Episyron rufipes nests are parasitised by the spider wasp Evagetes pectinipes; the female of which eats the egg of Episyron and then replaces it with her own egg before the nest is resealed. E . rufipes is also parasitised by Ceropales maculata.

== Distribution ==
Western Europe to Central Asia. In Britain, it is widespread and locally common in coastal areas of the south as far north as Yorkshire and Lancashire. It is less common in the north.

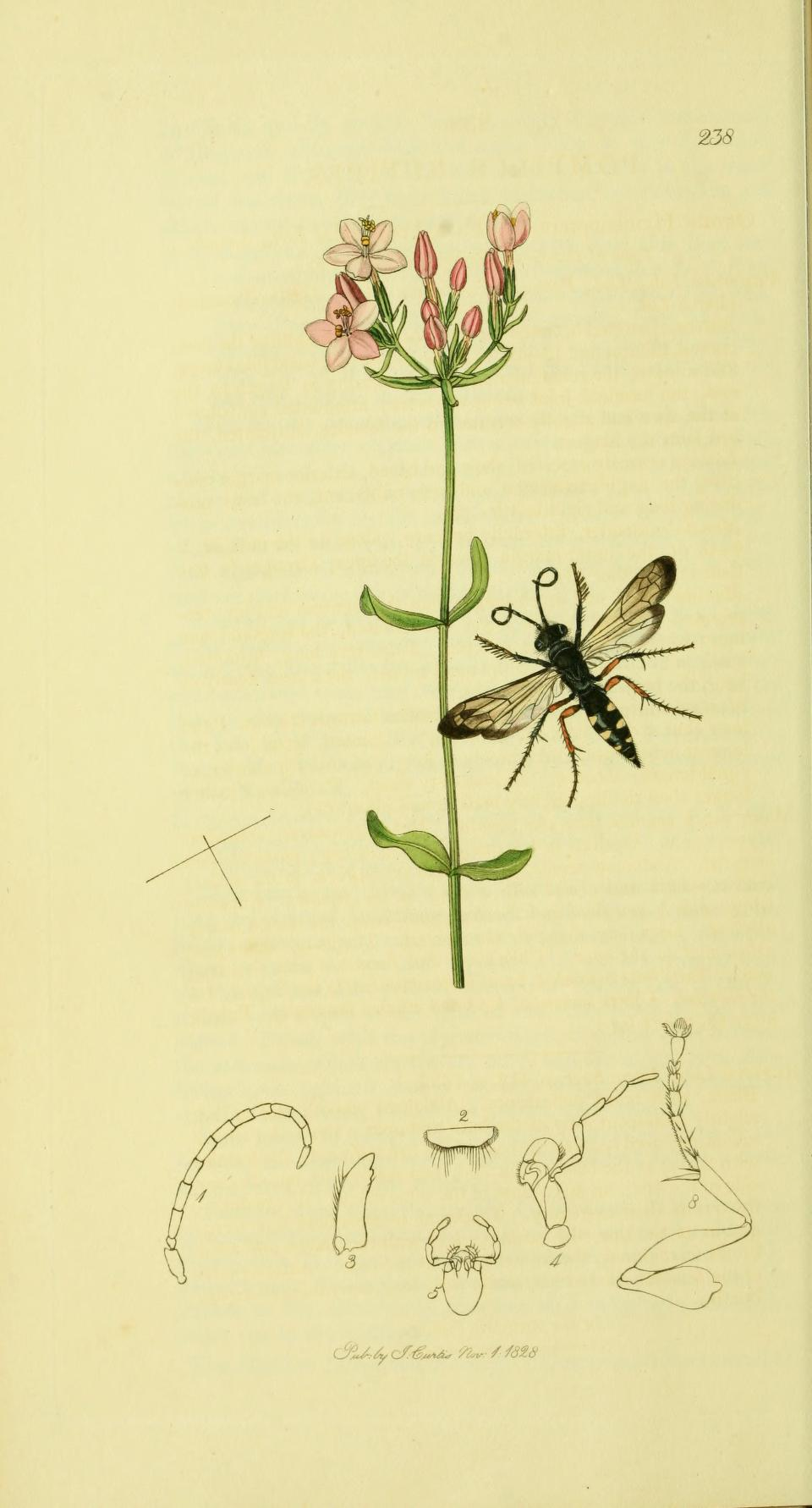
