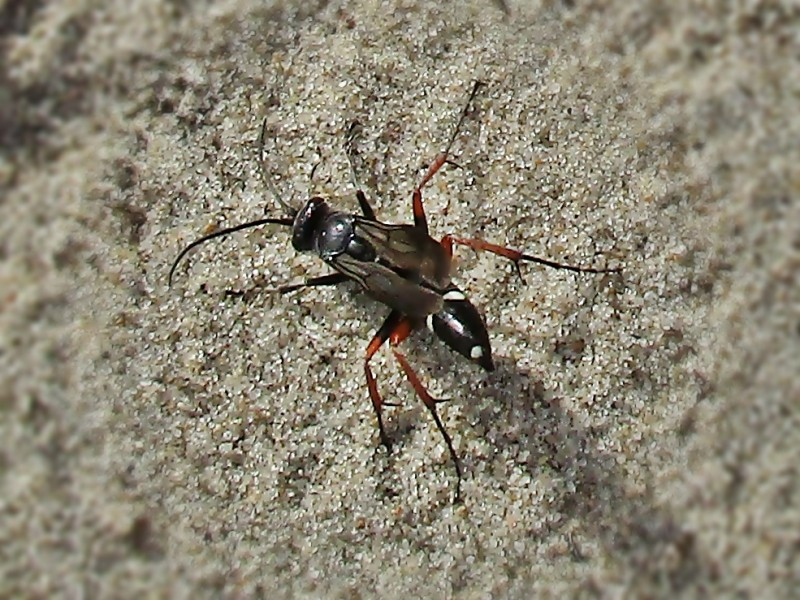
- Episyron rufipes

Scientific classification
- Kingdom: Animalia
- Phylum: Arthropoda
- Clade: Pancrustacea
- Class: Insecta
- Order: Hymenoptera
- Family: Pompilidae
- Tribe: Episyronini
- Genus: Episyron; Schioedte, 1837

Type species
- Sphex rufipes Linnaeus, 1758

= Episyron =

Genus of wasps

Episyron is a genus of wasps in the family Pompilidae which prey on spiders. Nine species are found in Europe.

== Features ==
Episyron wasps are medium to large in size. The head and thorax have long, dark clustered hair with spotted abdomens.

== Habits ==
These wasps occur in open sandy habitats where the females can burrow easily to create nests. They prey on spiders of the families Araneidae, Lycosidae and Tetragnathidae.

== Species ==
The following species are recognised in the genus Episyron:

- Episyron albisquamis Priesner, 1966
- Episyron albonotatum Vander Linden, 1827
- Episyron anticus Haupt, 1962
- Episyron argillaceus Arnold, 1936
- Episyron arizonica Banks, 1933
- Episyron arnoldi Priesner, 1967
- Episyron arrogans Smith, 1873
- Episyron atrytone Banks, 1911
- Episyron bakeri Banks, 1934
- Episyron bequaerti Arnold, 1936
- Episyron bicinctus Bischoff, 1913
- Episyron biguttatus Fabricius, 1798
- Episyron binghami Banks, 1934
- Episyron braunsii Arnold, 1936
- Episyron candiotum Wahis, 1966
- Episyron capiticrassum Ferton, 1901
- Episyron coccineipes Saunders, 1901
- Episyron conterminus Smith, 1885
- Episyron corsicus Priesner, 1966
- Episyron crassicornis Arnold, 1936
- Episyron dimissionis Priesner, 1967
- Episyron flaveolus Gussakovskij, 1928
- Episyron fraternus Banks, 1946
- Episyron froggati Turner, 1910
- Episyron fulvimaculatus Song & Li, 2025
- Episyron fuliginosum Wahis, 2006
- Episyron funerarium Tournier, 1889
- Episyron gallicum Tournier, 1889
- Episyron gryps Saussure
- Episyron histrio Lepeletier, 1845
- Episyron hopponis Matsumura, 1912
- Episyron immaculatus Song & Ma,2025
- Episyron insulanus Wolf, 1961
- Episyron kaplani Wolf, 1998
- Episyron kurilense Lelej, 1990
- Episyron laevis Banks
- Episyron latimarginatus Tsuneki, 1989
- Episyron levantinum Wahis, 1966
- Episyron maehleri Krombein, 1948
- Episyron maneei Banks
- Episyron novarae Kohl, 1885
- Episyron orbitalis Haupt, 1962
- Episyron ordinarius Priesner, 1966
- Episyron oregon Evans, 1960
- Episyron pedunculatus Arnold, 1936
- Episyron pilifrons Smith, 1859
- Episyron praestigiosum Wahis, 1978
- Episyron quinquenotatus (Say)
- Episyron rufipes Linnaeus, 1758
- Episyron rufotibialis Tsuneki, 1989
- Episyron saussurei Banks, 1934
- Episyron sardonius Priesner, 1966
- Episyron sardous Wolf, 1961
- Episyron snowi Banks, 1910
- Episyron solitaneum Kohl, 1906
- Episyron stantoni Ashmead, 1905
- Episyron trispinosus Gussakovskii, 1952
- Episyron tristis Priesner, 1955
- Episyron tropicalis Arnold, 1936
- Episyron turneri Arnold, 1936
- Episyron vagabundum Smith, 1858
- Episyron viduus Arnold, 1936
- Episyron vindex Smith, 1879
