= Hogweed =

Hogweed is a common name for several unrelated plants.

Hogweed may refer to:

- Heracleum, a genus in the carrot family containing several plants often called hogweed, including:
  - Heracleum sphondylium, the common hogweed
  - Heracleum mantegazzianum, the giant hogweed
  - Heracleum sosnowskyi, Sosnowsky's hogweed
  - Heracleum persicum, Persian hogweed
- Boerhavia, a genus in the four o'clock flower family containing species sometimes called hogweed
- Zaleya galericulata, a species in the iceplant family, formerly in the genus Trianthema

== See also ==
- Pigweed
