= August Victor Paul Blüthgen =

German entomologist

August Victor Paul Blüthgen (25 July 1880 in Mühlhausen, Thüringen – 2 September 1967 in Naumburg) was a German entomologist who specialised in Hymenoptera.

He was a Doctor of Law Jurist and court adviser. Blüthgen described very many new species of Aculeata (bees and wasps).
