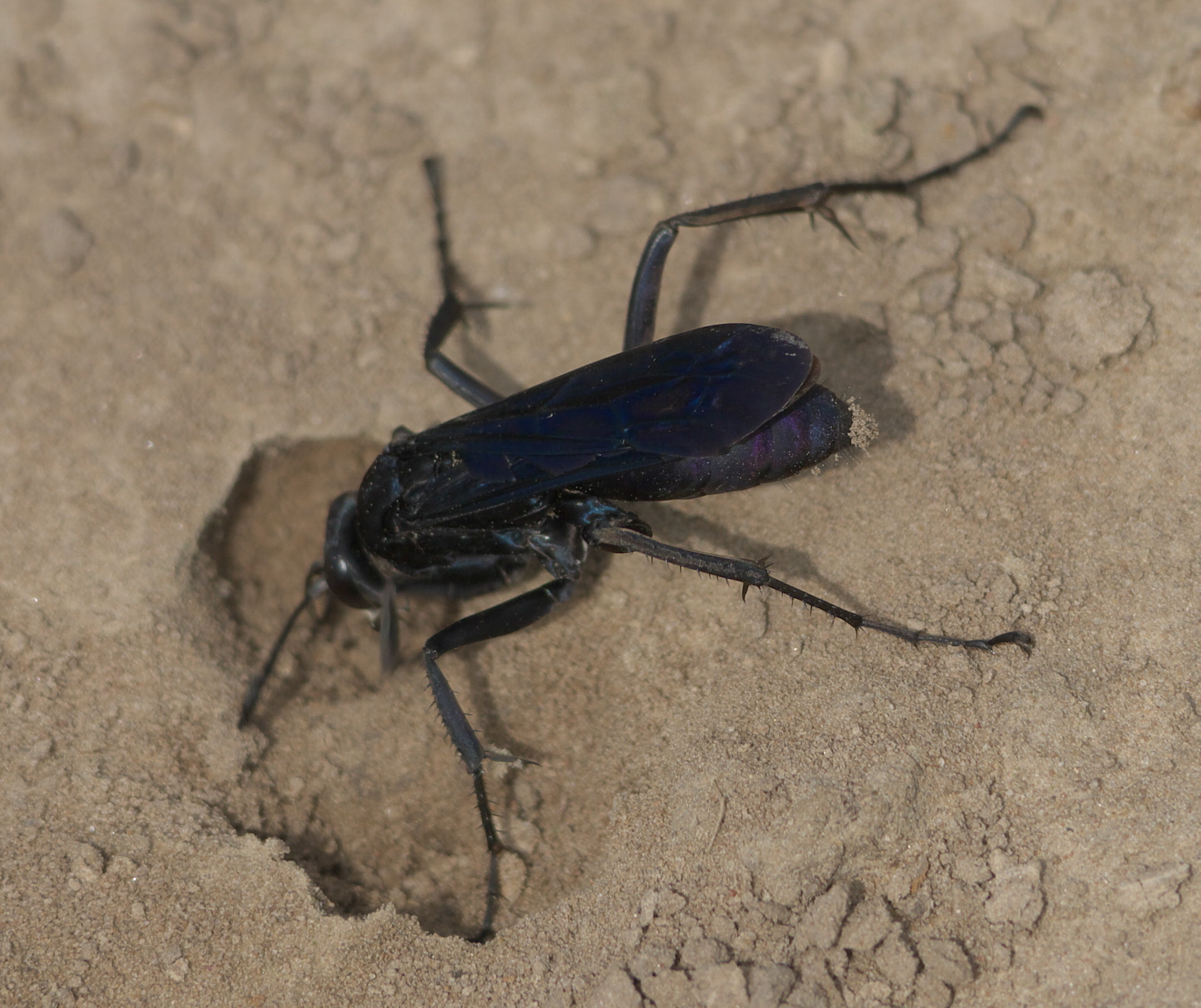
- Anoplius

Scientific classification
- Domain: Eukaryota
- Kingdom: Animalia
- Phylum: Arthropoda
- Class: Insecta
- Order: Hymenoptera
- Family: Pompilidae
- Subfamily: Pompilinae
- Tribe: Pompilini

= Pompilini =

Tribe of wasps

Pompilini is a tribe of spider wasps in the family Pompilidae. There are about 18 genera and at least 50 described species in Pompilini.

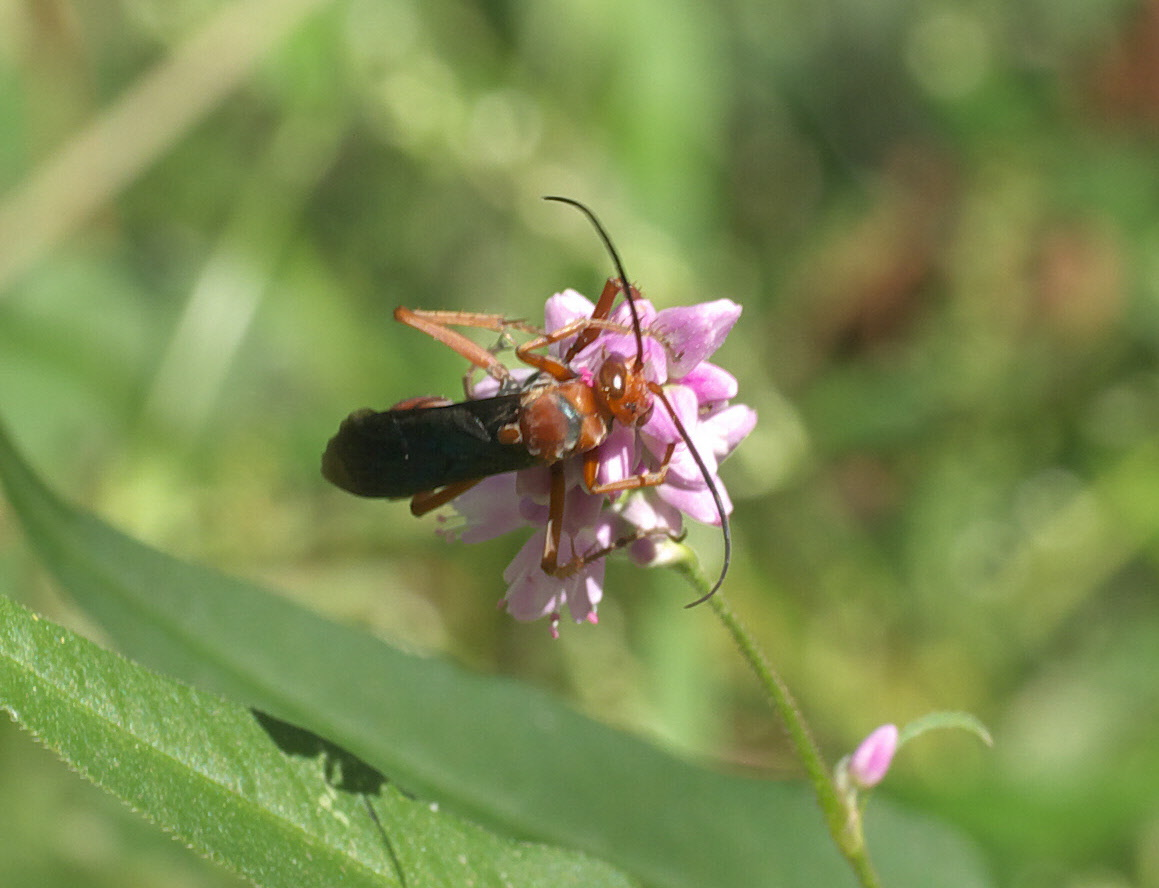
Tachypompilus ferrugineus ferrugineus

== Genera ==
These 18 genera belong to the tribe Pompilini:

- Agenioideus Ashmead, 1902^{c g b}
- Allochares Banks, 1917^{c g b}
- Ammosphex Wilcke, 1942^{c g b}
- Anoplius Dufour, 1834^{i c g b} (blue-black spider wasps)
- Anoplochares^{b}
- Aporinellus Banks, 1911^{c g b}
- Arachnospila Kincaid, 1900^{c g b}
- Chalcochares Banks, 1917^{c g b}
- Episyron Schiödte, 1837^{i c g b}
- Evagetes Lepeletier, 1845^{c g b}
- Hesperopompilus^{b}
- Paracyphononyx Gribodo, 1884^{c g b}
- Perissopompilus^{b}
- Poecilopompilus Ashmead, 1902^{c g b}
- Tachypompilus Ashmead, 1902^{i c g b}
- Tastiotenia Evans, 1950^{c g b}
- Xenopompilus Evans, 1954^{c g b}
- Xerochares Evans, 1951^{c g b}

Data sources: i = ITIS, c = Catalogue of Life, g = GBIF, b = Bugguide.net
