= Arachnospila consobrina =

Scientific classification
- Domain: Eukaryota
- Kingdom: Animalia
- Phylum: Arthropoda
- Class: Insecta
- Order: Hymenoptera
- Family: Pompilidae
- Genus: Arachnospila
- Species: A. consobrina

Binomial name
- Arachnospila consobrina (Dahlbom, 1843)

Synonyms
- Pompilus consobrina; Pompilus alpinus; Pompilus continentalis; Psammochares emissus; Pompilus guimarensis; Psammochares heringi; Psammochares lanuginosus; Pompilus nivariae; Pompilus pyrenaicus; Pompilus siculus

Species of wasp

Arachnospila consobrina is a little-known Palaearctic spider wasp.

== Description ==
Like other members of the sub-genus Ammosphex this is a medium-sized red and black spider wasp. The males have a quite distinctive genital plate, but females are very similar to related species such as A. anceps and A.trivialis but can be identified by their relatively hairier head.

== Distribution ==
Northern and central Europe, marginally in southern Britain, and also Africa and Asia.

== Biology ==
A consobrina is single brooded, flying in July and August. The only observation of A. consobrina with prey concerns a female found under a stone near Constantinople carrying a Segestria florentina which was reported in Fahringer. The nesting biology of A. consobrina is almost completely unknown, but like other Arachnospila species in the sub-genus Ammosphex it is adapted to digging in loose sandy soils.
