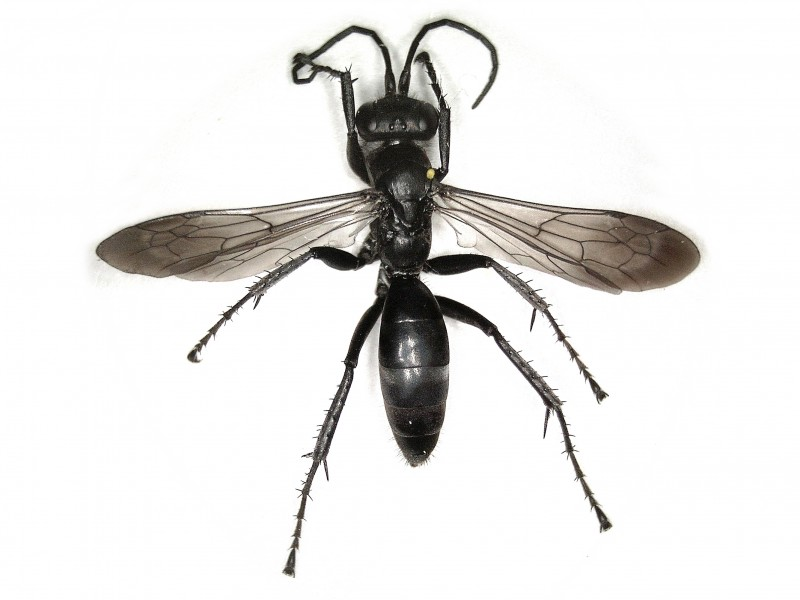
- Pompilus cinereus

Scientific classification
- Kingdom: Animalia
- Phylum: Arthropoda
- Clade: Pancrustacea
- Class: Insecta
- Order: Hymenoptera
- Family: Pompilidae
- Subfamily: Pompilinae; Latreille, 1805

Tribes
- see text

Synonyms
- Psammocharidae

= Pompilinae =

Subfamily of wasps

The Pompilinae are a subfamily of the spider wasp family, Pompilidae, the species of which lay their eggs on the paralyzed bodies of their prey.

== Taxonomy and phylogeny ==
Tribal classification has been revised numerous times with little consensus between authors. Bradley's 1944 classification used seven tribes: Allocharini, Allocyphononychini, Aporini, Ctenocerini, Epipompilini, Pedinaspini, Pompilini. Evans's 1951 classification only included 5 of these tribes, omitting Allocharini and Allocyphononychini. Ctenocerini has since been elevated to subfamily status as Ctenocerinae, and Epipompilini has been omitted by Pitts et al. in 2006. Engel and Grimaldi, later in 2006, included 17 extant tribes: Allocharini, Allocyphonychini, Anoplageniini, Anopliini, Aporini (with 3 subtribes), Cordyloscelidini, Eidopompilini, Entomoborini, Episyronini, Notocyphini, Pedinaspini, Pompilini, Psammoderini, Pseudopompilini, Spuridiophorini, Tachypompilini, and Teinotrachelini. Waichert et al. added two additional tribes in 2015, Priochilini with 2 genera and Sericopompilini with a single genus. While Ghahari et al. reinstated Homonotini in 2014 as a separate tribe from Aporini, Loktionov and Lelej maintained the treatment of Engel and Grimaldi as a subtribe of Aporini. In 2015, Waichert et al. removed Notocyphini from Pompilinae, treating it as the separate subfamily, Notocyphinae. Loktionov's 2023 distributional catalog included the type genera of Cordyloscelidini and Spuridiophorini and the type genus of Teinotrachelini under Ctenocerinae. The type genera of Allocyphonychini, Anoplageniini, and Pedinaspini were also omitted.

The summary of the represented tribes is as follows:

- Allocharini
- Anopliini
- Aporini contains 6 genera of Aporina plus one genus each in Ferreolina and Homonotina.
- Eidopompilini
- Entomoborini
- Episyronini
- Pompilini
- Priochilini contains 2 genera
- Psammoderini
- Pseudopompilini
- Sericopompilini contains a single genus
- Tachypompilini contains a single genus

== Description and identification ==
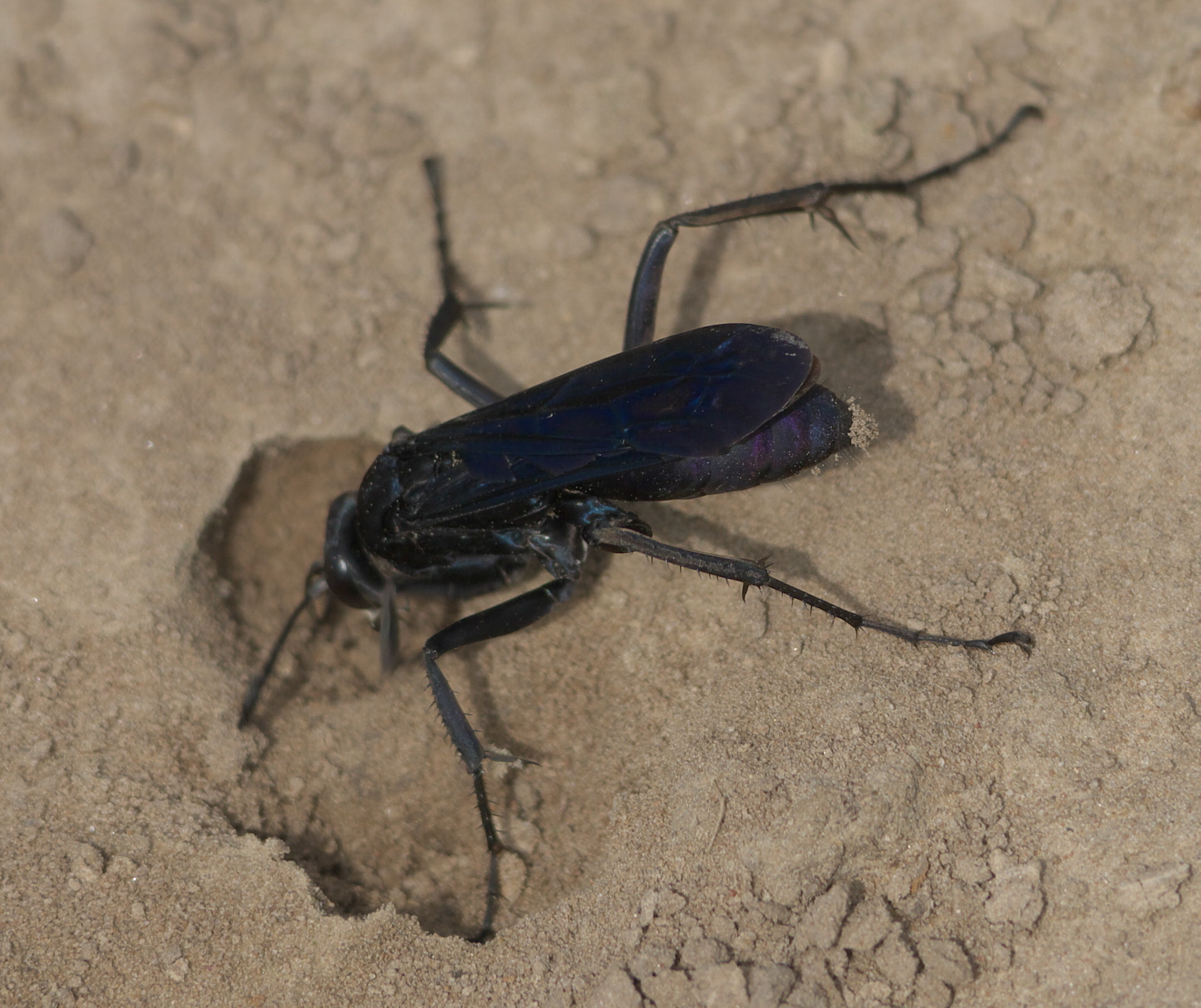
Anoplius body morphology

Pompilinae are distinguished from sister subfamilies by minute differences in head structure, leg morphology, and wing venation. The eyes have oval to only slightly sinuate inner margins, and the labrum is short. The middle and hind legs have tibial spurs of unequal lengths and femora with small spines or pits. The hind leg additionally has wide, blade-like bristles on the fifth tasomere. The forewing has the medial vein (M) falling short of the margin and the second cubital vein (Cu2) bent at the base rather than straight.

== Genera ==
The subfamily Pompilinae contains 107 genera:

- Aeluropetrus Arnold, 1936
- Agenioidevagetes Wolf, 1978
- Anoplioides Haupt, 1950
- Apareia Haupt, 1929
- Aplochares Banks, 1944
- Aporoideus Ashmead, 1902
- Argyroclitus Arnold, 1937
- Aridestus Banks, 1947
- Aspidaporus Bradley, 1944
- Atelostegus Haupt, 1929
- Atopompilus Arnold, 1934
- Austrochares Banks, 1947
- Bambesa Arnold, 1936
- Cliochares Banks, 1941
- Ctenostegus Haupt, 1930
- Dromochares Haupt, 1930
- Epiclinotus Haupt, 1929
- Erythropompilus Shimizu & Pitts, 2021
- Eurostocurgus Haupt, 1962
- Euryzonotulus Arnold, 1937
- Galactopterus Arnold, 1937
- Guichardia Arnold, 1951
- Hanedapompilus Shimizu, 2005
- Hatanomus Tsuneki, 1990
- Hauptiella Arnold, 1936
- Herpetosphex Arnold, 1940
- Icazus Priesner, 1966
- Idiaporina Evans, 1974
- Kentronaporus Wolf, 1990
- Kolposphex Arnold, 1959
- Kyphopompilus Arnold, 1960
- Micraporus Priesner, 1955
- Microferreola Haupt, 1935
- Minotocyphus Banks, 1934
- Morochares Banks, 1934
- Narochares Banks, 1934
- Neanoplius Banks, 1947
- Odontoderes Haupt, 1926
- Pareiocurgus Haupt, 1930
- Pareioxenus Haupt, 1962
- Plagomma Haupt, 1941
- Pompiliodon Wasbauer, 2019
- Pseudoclavelia Haupt, 1930
- Pygmachus Haupt, 1930
- Rhabdaporus Bradley, 1944
- Rhynchopompilus Arnold, 1934
- Spuridiophorus Arnold, 1934
- Stolidia Priesner, 1966
- Syntomoclitus Arnold, 1937
- Tagalochares Banks, 1934
- Telostholus Haupt, 1929
- Tupiaporus Arle, 1947
- Turneromyia Banks, 1941
- Xenanoplius Haupt, 1950
- Xenopompilus Evans,1953

=== Tribe Allocharini ===
- Allochares Banks, 1917

=== Tribe Anopliini ===
- Anoplius Dufour, 1834
- Lophopompilus Radoszkowski, 1887

=== Tribe Aporini ===
==== Subtribe Aporina ====
- Allaporus Banks, 1933
- Aporus Spinola, 1808
- Chelaporus Bradley, 1944
- Drepanaporus Bradley, 1944
- Euplaniceps Hauptm, 1930
- Psorthaspis Banks, 1912

==== Subtribe Ferreolina ====
- Ferreola Lepeletier, 1845

==== Subtribe Homonotina ====
- Homonotus Dahlbom, 1843

=== Tribe Eidopompilini ===
- Eidopompilus Kohl, 1899
- Microphadnus Cameron, 1904
- Stigmaporus Zonstein, 2001
- Tachyagetes Haupt, 1930
- Telostegus Costa, 1887
- Xenaporus Ashmead, 1902

=== Tribe Entomoborini ===
- Entomobora Gistel, 1857

=== Tribe Episyronini ===
- Batozonellus Arnold, 1937
- Episyron Schiödte, 1837
- Parabatozonus Yasumatsu, 1936

=== Tribe Pompilini ===
- Aetheopompilus Arnold, 1934
- Agenioideus Ashmead, 1902
- Amblyellus Wolf, 1965
- Anospilus Haupt, 1929
- Aporinellus Banks, 1911
- Arachnospila Kincaid, 1900
- Chalcochares Banks, 1917
- Ctenagenia de Saussure, 1892
- Dicyrtomellus Gussakowski, 1935
- Evagetes Lepeletier, 1845
- Gonaporus Ashmead, 1902
- Hesperopompilus Evans, 1948
- Microcurgus Haupt, 1950
- Nanoclavelia Priesner, 1948
- Pamirospila Wolf, 1970
- Paracyphononyx Gribodo, 1884
- Paragenioides Wolf, 1968
- Pedinpompilus Wolf, 1961
- Perissopompilus Evans, 1951
- Poecilopompilus Howard, 1901
- Pompilus Fabricius, 1798
- Schistonyx Saussure, 1887
- Tastiotenia Evans, 1950
- Xerochares Evans, 1951

=== Tribe Priochilini ===
- Braunilla Wasbauer & Kimsey, 2019
- Priochilus Banks, 1944

=== Tribe Psammoderini ===
- Arachnotheutes Ashmead, 1893
- Paraferreola Sustera, 1913
- Psammoderes Haupt, 1929

=== Tribe Pseudopompilini ===
- Pseudopompilus Costa, 1887

=== Tribe Sericopompilini ===
- Sericopompilus Howard, 1901

=== Tribe Tachypompilini ===
- Tachypompilus Ashmead, 1902
