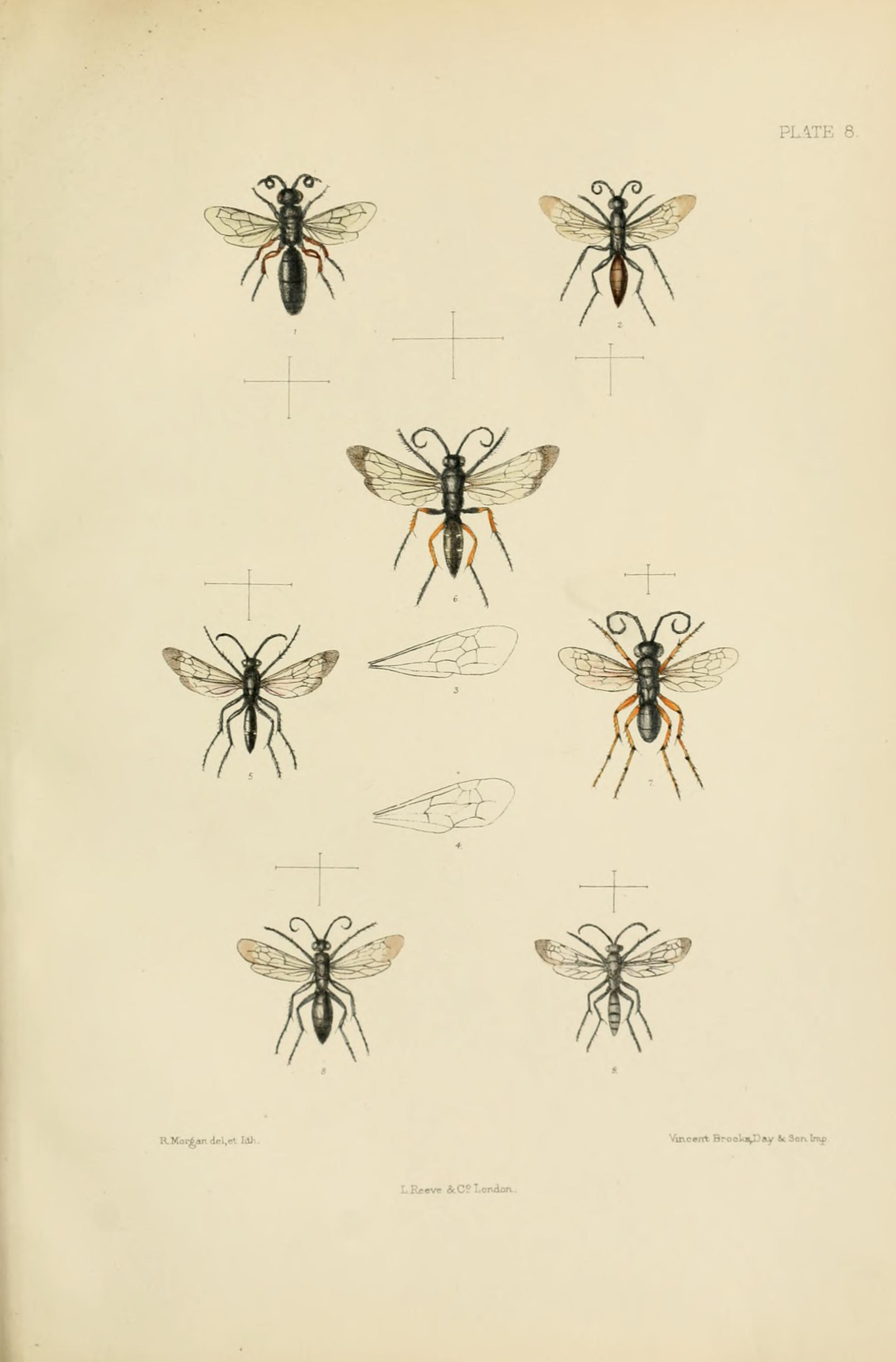
- Agenioideus cinctellus figure 7

Scientific classification
- Kingdom: Animalia
- Phylum: Arthropoda
- Clade: Pancrustacea
- Class: Insecta
- Order: Hymenoptera
- Family: Pompilidae
- Genus: Agenioideus
- Species: A. cinctellus

Binomial name
- Agenioideus cinctellus Spinola, 1808

Synonyms
- Pompilus cinctellus Spinola, 1808; Pompilus clypeatus Dahlbom 1829; Pompilus punctipes Dahlbom 1832; Anoplius tibialis Lepeletier 1845; Psammochares cinctellus (Spinola 1908); Agenioideus pacifica Lelej et al., 1994; Agenioideus rufus Lelej et al., 1994

= Agenioideus cinctellus =

Species of wasp

Agenioideus cinctellus is a spider wasp of the subfamily Pompilinae with a Palearctic distribution.

== Description ==
A. cinctellus is a relatively small species of spider wasp being 6–8 mm long. The abdomen is mainly black in colour but the rest of the body is very variable and the legs may vary from whitish to reddish brown, some specimens have spots on the tibia of the hind. There is often an oval spot on the inner edge of the eye.

== Habitat ==
This species prefers dry habitats and sandy soils. It can be seen searching for prey on vertical surfaces such as old walls. The species has been found on unstable clay under-cliffs on the Dorset coast.

== Biology ==
In Britain, the flight period is normally June to August but occasionally adults emerge as early as late May.

The main prey species are small jumping spiders of the family Salticidae, but members of the family Thomisidae will occasionally be used. This wasp will also hunt spiders found on vertical or nearly vertical planes, such as cliffs, walls and the overturned root plates of wind thrown trees.

This wasp uses a wide range of natural cavities for nesting, but will also utilise the abandoned burrows of other aculeate hymenoptera, empty mud cells and snail shells. The entrance to the nest is blocked with detritus. This is one of the hosts for the kleptoparasitic spider wasp Ceropales maculata. It appears that before until the prey is deposited in the nest it may not be totally paralysed by the wasp. It is not known what flower the adults nectar on.

== Distribution ==
Found in southern England north to the Midlands and East Anglia through central and northern Europe eastwards as far as Japan. It has recently been recorded in Ontario, Canada, the first record of this species in North America.
