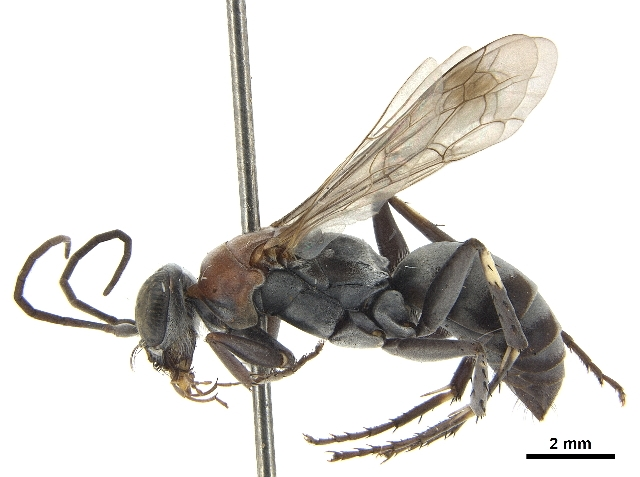
- Spuridiophorus capensis

Scientific classification
- Kingdom: Animalia
- Phylum: Arthropoda
- Class: Insecta
- Order: Hymenoptera
- Family: Pompilidae
- Subfamily: Pompilinae
- Genus: Spuridiophorus; Arnold, 1934

= Spuridiophorus =

Genus of wasps

Spuridiophorus is a genus of wasps belonging to the family Pompilidae. It has been found to be sister to a clade including Ferreola and Homonotus.

The genus is found in southern Africa and Australia.

== Species ==
The following species are recognised:

- Spuridiophorus capensis (Brauns, 1906)
- Spuridiophorus inermis Arnold, 1934
- Spuridiophorus maculipennis Arnold, 1936
- Spuridiophorus similis Guigla 1943
- Spuridiophorus turneri Arnold, 1936
- Spuridiophorus ultimus (Turner, 1916)
