= Evagetes crassicornis =

Scientific classification
- Kingdom: Animalia
- Phylum: Arthropoda
- Class: Insecta
- Order: Hymenoptera
- Family: Pompilidae
- Genus: Evagetes
- Species: E. crassicornis

Binomial name
- Evagetes crassicornis (Shuckard, 1837)

Synonyms
- Pompilus crassicornis Shuckard, 1837; Pompilus campestris Wesmael 1851; Pompilus dalbomi Thomson1870; Pompilus intermedius Schenck 1857; Evagetes leptophthalmus Wolf 1961; Evagetes pubescens Wolf 1958; Evagetes subarticus Wolf 1964

Species of wasp

Evagetes crassicornis is a kleptoparasitic spider wasp with a holarctic distribution.

== Description ==
A red and black spider hunting wasp with fairly short and thick antennae with well-developed sensory powers which it uses to identify the nests of other spider wasps and tarsal combs on the forelegs for digging into these nests.

== Biology ==
In Great Britain and Ireland the flight period is May to September. E. crassicornis is a kleptoparasitic species probably preying on various species of spider wasp, although specific hosts have not been identified. It is thought that in Britain the hosts are Arachnospila anceps and Anoplius nigerrimus, and there is a European record of Arachnospila trivialis being parasitised. E. crassicornis spends a lot of time searching for the nests of its host species on open sunny ground. Once the host's nest has been invaded E. crassicornis eats the hosts's egg and lays its own on the paralysed spider and then reseals the host's nest.

Adult E. crassicornis visit a wide variety of open flowers which have short corollae, especially Apiaceae and Asteraceae.

== Habitat ==
Although E. crassicornis shows a preference for sandy habitats, it may be encountered on areas of open ground within a variety of habitats.

== Distribution ==
Northern and central Europe east to central Asia also in North America.

== Taxonomy ==
Evagetes crassicornis was first formally described as Pompilus crassicornis in an Essay on the indigenous fossorial Hymenoptera; comprising a description of all the British species of burrowing sand wasps contained in the metropolitan collections; with their habits as far as they have been observed by the English bookseller and entomologist William Edward Shuckard published in 1837 with Great Britain given as the type locality.

E. crassicornis has two subspecies which are

- E.c.crassicornis (Shuckard)
- E.c. consimilis (Banks) which is found only in western North America, E.c crassicornis replaces it in the east and north of that continent.

This species is regarded as part of a species complex alongside E. orientalis and E. shalbergi.
