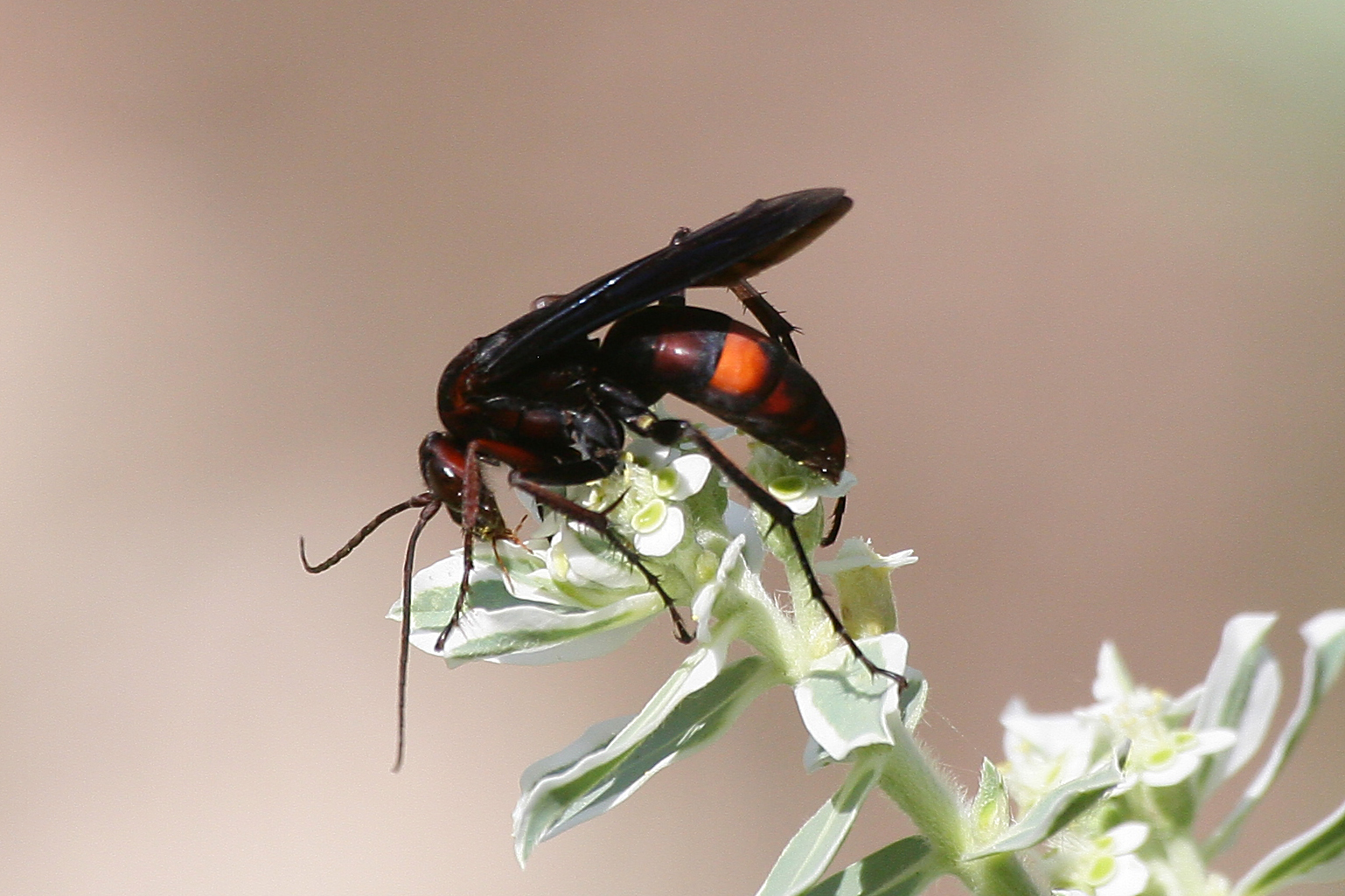

Scientific classification
- Kingdom: Animalia
- Phylum: Arthropoda
- Class: Insecta
- Order: Hymenoptera
- Family: Pompilidae
- Genus: Poecilopompilus
- Species: P. algidus

Binomial name
- Poecilopompilus algidus (Smith, 1855)

Synonyms
- Batazonus flavipennis (Banks, 1921); Pompilus coquilletti (Provancher, 1887); Pompilus marcidus (Smith, 1862); Pompilus pygidialis (Kohl, 1886); Pompilus willistoni (Patton, 1879)

= Poecilopompilus algidus =

Species of wasp

Poecilopompilus algidus is a species of spider wasp which is widespread in the Americas.

== Description ==
P. algidus is 13–28 mm in length with females usually larger than males and in some areas it is a mainly black wasp with a red spot on the metasoma. However, the wasps of the genus Poecilopompilus may be Müllerian mimics of other wasps and that the variation in appearance of P.algidus over its range is due to it mimicking other sympatric wasps with painful stings, for example it resembles the paper wasps in the genus Polistes in the south, and thus be difficult to distinguish from its congener Poecilopompilus interruptus, but in the northern part of its range, it mimics the spider wasps of the genus Anoplius. To identify the two species, the observer needs to examine the spines on the front tarsi of females and the inner margin of the eyes, P. algidus females have 3 strong spines and the species shows convergent inner eye margins, while P. interruptus shows four weak spines on the front tarsi in females and parallel inner eye margins.

== Subspecies ==
There are 5 recognised subspecies

- Poecilopompilus algidus algidus (Smith, 1855) eastern North America.
- Poecilopompilus algidus coquilletti (Provancher) south-western United States
- Poecilopompilus algidus fervidus (Smith, 1873) Neotropical
- Poecilopompilus algidus marcidus (F.W., 167815) western North America
- Poecilopompilus algidus rubiginosus

== Distribution ==
From the Ontario south through the United States of America, Mexico and Central America to Argentina.

== Habitat ==
Prefers sandy areas where it is fossorial, but can be found in well vegetated areas.

== Biology ==
In the northern part of its range it is an univoltine mid-summer to late autumn species, a bit in the warmer parts of its range it is probably multivoltine.

Male specimens have been captured at flowers of Baccharis spp, Chrysothamnus viscidiflorus, Heracleum lanatum and Melilotus albus while females have also been taken at the flowers of Melilotus.

Females provision the burrows with spiders of the family Araneidae. In São Paulo State, Brazil females of P.a. fervidus were observed while breeding in a sandy bank among a plantation of Eucalyptus. The wasps hunted spiders in the understorey, these wasps are regarded as a specialist hunter of orb web spiders, in the family Araneidae. The wasps were observed to switch from Nephila clavipes in July to Parawixia sp., Argiope argentata and Araneus sp. as the year progressed.

Observations of the nominate subspecies in southern Florida showed that the female wasps hunted in the late afternoon and that they actively hunted within the scrub and trees at heights of between 3m and 20m. The wasps hunted by actively walking on the surface of the vegetation, intermittently flicking their wings, but stayed in the outer layers of leaves and did not enter into deeper cover. The only prey observed as an adult female Eriophora ravilla which the wasp had placed in vegetation 8 cm above the ground, while the wasp excavated a burrow 1.2 m away. The burrow was excavated in bare sand among dried pine needles, the wasp used her mandibles to break the crust on the surface of the sand, and then used her forelimbs to excavate the looser sand, which was removed by the wasp backing out to a distance of 10–13 cm. Her digging activities got faster as she neared completion of the burrow, occasionally interrupting her efforts to inspect and move the prey. To move the prey, it was dragged backwards over the ground and under the vegetation while the wasp held it by the base of the hind femur. Before placing the spider in the nest she carried out further excavation and appeared to line the nest with dried pine needles which she carried into the burrow, then the spider was grabbed by its chelicerae and dragged into the burrow. The wasp then backfilled the burrow with loose sand using its forelegs and once the burrow was filled it appeared to tamp the sand down with its abdomen before place pine needles over the now buried nest.
