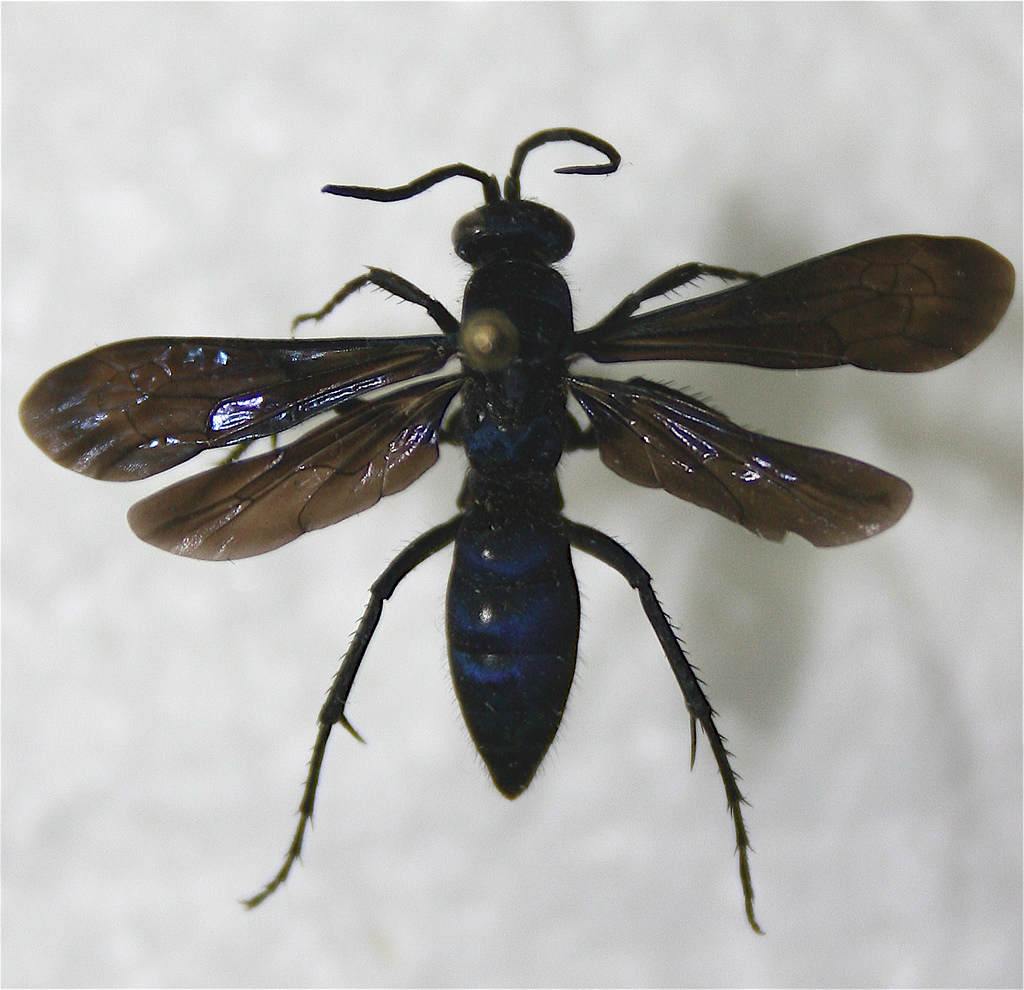
- Spider Wasp, Evagetes ingenuus caught near the Dead River in Marquette County, Michigan.

Scientific classification
- Kingdom: Animalia
- Phylum: Arthropoda
- Class: Insecta
- Order: Hymenoptera
- Family: Pompilidae
- Subfamily: Pompilinae
- Genus: Evagetes; Lepeletier, 1845

Type species
- Evagetes bicolor Lepeletier, 1845

= Evagetes =

Genus of wasps

Evagetes is a genus of spider wasps from the family Pompilidae. There are 72 described species, of which 58 are found in the Palaearctic region, 11 in the Nearctic region, with a few penetrating to the Afrotropical, Oriental and Neotropic regions. Evagetes wasps are kleptoparasitic on other pompilid wasps, especially the genera Arachnospila, Anoplius, Episyron and Pompilus, digging into their sealed burrows, eating the host egg and replacing it with an egg of its own. Evagetes wasps are characterised by their very short antennae. Most are species are black with the base of the antennae rufous, several Evagetes species are very metallic bluish insects.

The type species was named by Lepeletier as Evagetes bicolor in 1845 but this has since been recognised as a synonym for E. dubius.

== Selected species ==
- Evagetes alamannicus (Bluthgen, 1944)
- Evagetes anatolicus Van der Smissen, 2003
- Evagetes baguenae Junco y Reyes, 1960
- Evagetes cabrerai (Junco y Reyes, 1944)
- Evagetes calefactus Evans, 1966
- Evagetes crassicornis (Shuckard, 1837)
- Evagetes daisetzusanus Ishikawa 1960
- Evagetes deiranbo Ishikawa 1960
- Evagetes dubius (Vander Linden, 1827)
- Evagetes elongatus (Lepeletier, 1845)
- Evagetes fatimaae Wolf, 1990
- Evagetes fabrei Van der Smissen, 2003
- Evagetes fortunatus Wolf, 1970
- Evagetes fortunatarum Wolf, 1980
- Evagetes gibbulus (Lepeletier, 1845)
- Evagetes gusenleitneri Wolf 1988
- Evagetes hyacinthinus Cresson 1867
- Evagetes iconionus Wolf, 1970
- Evagetes ingenuus Cresson 1867
- Evagetes implicatus Haupt, 1941
- Evagetes ishikawai Lelei 1995
- Evagetes juncoi Wolf, 1970
- Evagetes littoralis (Wesmael, 1851)
- Evagetes longispinosus Wolf, 1990
- Evagetes macswaini Evans 1957
- Evagetes magrettii (Kohl, 1886)
- Evagetes meriane Van der Smissen, 2003
- Evagetes mochii Priesner, 1955
- Evagetes mohave (Banks, 1933)
- Evagetes nasobema Wolf, 1970
- Evagetes nitidulus (Guerin, 1838)
- Evagetes orientalis Lelej & Loktiniov 2009
- Evagetes orichalceus (Saunders 1901)
- Evagetes padrinus (Viereck, 1903)
- Evagetes palmatus (Haupt, 1930)
- Evagetes parifomarvicus (Sustera, 1924)
- Evagetes parvus Cresson 1865
- Evagetes paulinus Wolf 1970
- Evagetes pectinipes (Linnaeus, 1758)
- Evagetes piechockii Wolf 1981
- Evagetes piliferus Van der Smissen, 2003
- Evagetes pilosellus (Wesmael, 1851)
- Evagetes pontomoravicus (Sustera, 1938)
- Evagetes proximus (Dahlbom, 1843)
- Evagetes pseudoleucopterus Wolf 1970
- Evagetes sabulosus Tournier, 1889
- Evagetes sahlbergi (Morawitz, 1893)
- Evagetes servillei Costa, 1882
- Evagetes siculus (Lepeletier, 1845)
- Evagetes subangulatus Banks 1919
- Evagetes subglaber (Haupt, 1941)
- Evagetes subnudus (Haupt, 1942)
- Evagetes taiwanus Tsuneki 1989
- Evagetes transbaicalicus Lelei 1995
- Evagetes trispinosus (Kohl, 1886)
- Evagetes tumidosus (Tournier, 1890)
- Evagetes tumidinus Wolf, 1970
- Evagetes yezoensis Ishikawa 1960
- Evagetes zonatus (Haupt 1930)

== Bibliography ==
- Ishikawa R. 1960 On the genus Evagetes in Japan (Hymeoptera, Pompilidae) Insecta Matsumurana, 23(1)
- Japoshvili, G., Karaca, I. & Wahis, R. 2011 A List of Pompilidae (Hymenoptera) of Gölcük Natural Park Isparta, Turkey Mun. Ent. Zool. 6(1) 386–388
- Kirpik, M.A. 2009 Faunistic study on Pompilidae (Insecta: Hymenoptera) family in Ankara, Kirikkale, and Çankiri provinces African Journal of Biotechnology 8(2), pp. 316–318
- Ebrahimi, E., Schmid-Egger, C. & Wahis, R, 2008 New records of Pompilidae (Hymenoptera) from Iran, Linzer biol. Beitr. 40(2) 1435–1442
- Wolf, H. 1990 Bemerkungen zu einigen Wegwespen-Arten (Hymenoptera, Pompilidae) (5.) Linzer biol. Beitr 22(1) 247-285
