= Ferreola =

Ferreola may refer to:

- Ferreola (wasp), a wasp genus in the family Pompilidae
- Ferreola, a plant genus in the family Ebenaceae; synonym of Diospyros
