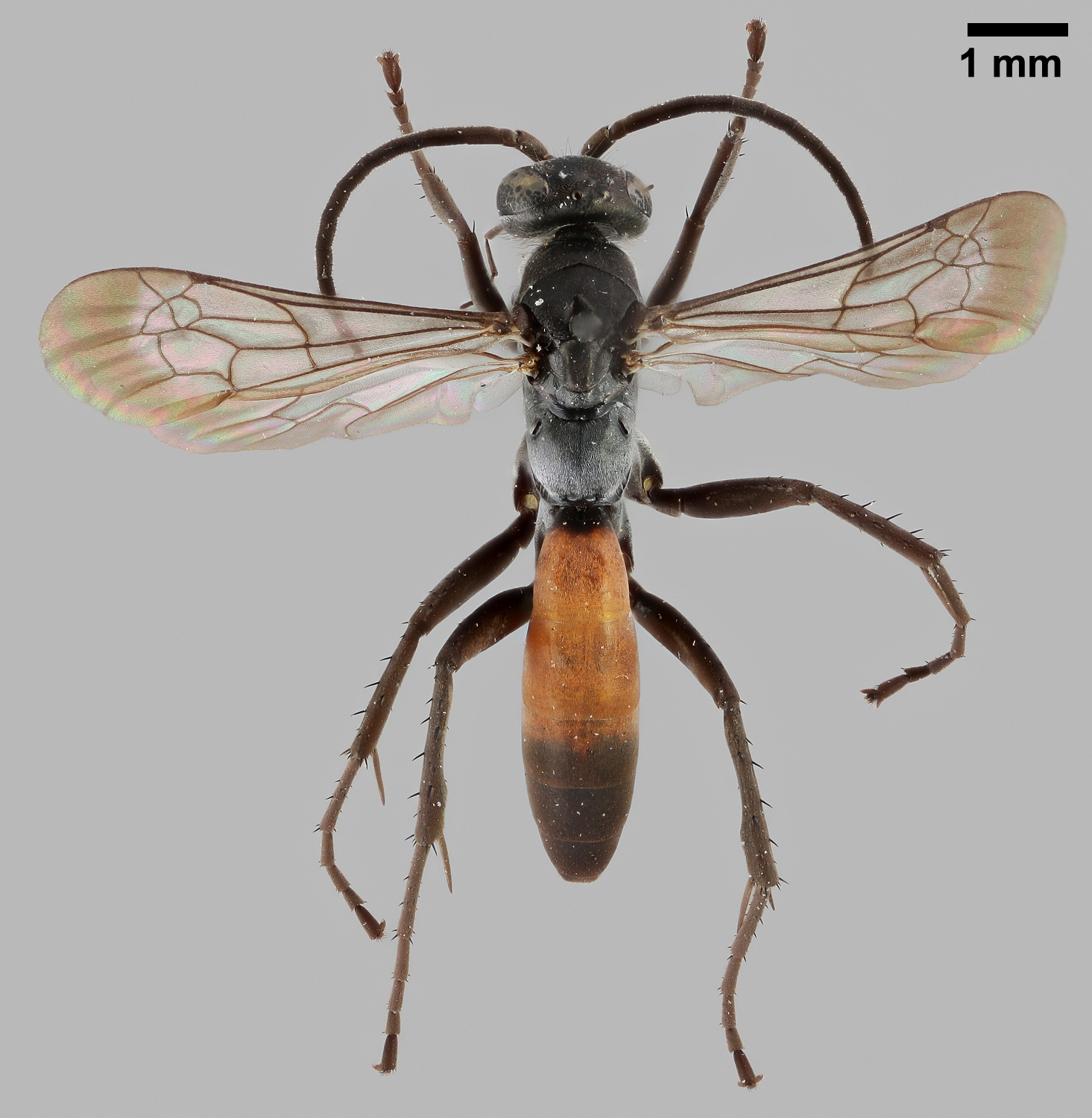
- Male, collected: Finland, Uusimaa, Hanko

Scientific classification
- Domain: Eukaryota
- Kingdom: Animalia
- Phylum: Arthropoda
- Class: Insecta
- Order: Hymenoptera
- Family: Pompilidae
- Genus: Arachnospila
- Species: A. minutula

Binomial name
- Arachnospila minutula (Dahlbom, 1842)

= Arachnospila minutula =

Species of wasp

Arachnospila minutula is a spider wasp that lives in parts of the Palaearctic.
