= Agenioideus nigricornis =

Scientific classification
- Kingdom: Animalia
- Phylum: Arthropoda
- Clade: Pancrustacea
- Class: Insecta
- Order: Hymenoptera
- Family: Pompilidae
- Genus: Agenioideus
- Species: A. nigricornis

Binomial name
- Agenioideus nigricornis Johan Christian Fabricius, 1775

Species of wasp

Agenioideus nigricornis, the redback spider-hunting wasp, is a species of spider wasp from the subfamily Pompilinae, found in Australia. It is a parasitoid of the venomous redback spider (Latrodectus hasseltii).

== Description ==
Females are 8.4–11.8mm in length. The head and mesosoma are reddish-brown or orange-brown while the posterior parts of the wasp are black, the limbs and antennae are blackish brown. The wings are sooty in colour, darker basally and paler distally. The males are 4.33–12.64 mm in length and are almost completely black in colour apart from some orange markings around the eyes and on the mesosoma, although these are variable and some individuals may be completely black. The forelegs are largely orange brown but the rest of the legs are uniformly black.

== Biology ==
The wasp was originally collected by the expedition of Captain James Cook in 1768 and the specimens were described by Johan Christian Fabricius in 1775, and then largely forgotten. A wasp was then observed dragging a redback spider to its nest in a garden in Beaconsfield Western Australia in 2010. Researchers then found an earlier instance from 1950 from South Australia. It is the first species of spider wasp to be recorded as a parasitoid of the redback spider.

== Distribution ==
Agenioideus nigricornis is found in Australia where it is widespread but it is apparently absent from Tasmania.

== Potential uses ==
As the redback spider has been introduced into areas outside of Australia in New Zealand and Japan, it has been suggested that Agenioideus nigricornis is potentially a biological control which can be used to control invasive populations of redback spiders.
