= Johan Wilhelm Zetterstedt =

Swedish naturalist (1785–1874)

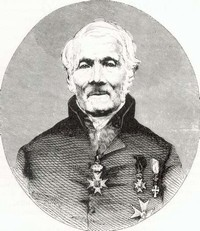
Johan Wilhelm Zetterstedt

Johan Wilhelm Zetterstedt (20 May 1785 – 23 December 1874) was a Swedish naturalist who worked mainly on Diptera and Hymenoptera.

== Biography ==
Zetterstedt studied at the University of Lund, where he was a pupil of Anders Jahan Retzius. He received the title of professor in 1822 and succeeded Carl Adolph Agardh as professor of botany and practical economy in 1836, retiring as emeritus in 1853. In 1831, he was elected a member of the Royal Swedish Academy of Sciences.

He is best known as an entomologist. His collections of Scandinavian, Lapland and world Diptera and Orthoptera are in the Zoological Museum of the University of Lund. His students include Anders Gustaf Dahlbom.

== Selected works ==
- 1810–1812 Dissertatio de Fæcundatione Plantarum
- 1821 Orthoptera Sueciae disposita et descripta. Lundae (Lund),132 pp.
- 1828 Fauna Insectorum Lapponica
- 1835 Monographia Scatophagarum Scandinaviæ
- 1837 Conspectus familiarum, generum et specierum Dipterorum, in Fauna insectorum Lapponica descriptorum. Isis (Oken's)
- 1838 Conspectus plantarum in horto botanico et plantatione Universitatis Typis excudit Carolus Fr. Berling
- 1838–1840 Insecta Lapponica. L. Voss, Lipsiae (Leipzig),1139 pp.
- 1842–1854. Diptera Scandinaviae disposita et descripta. Lundbergiana, Lundae (Lund),6 volumes.
- 1855. Diptera Scandinaviae disposita et descripta. Tomus duodecimus seu supplementum tertium, continens addenda, corrigenda & emendanda tomis undecim prioribus. Officina Lundbergiana, Lundae (Lund)
