= Priochilus captivum =

Scientific classification
- Domain: Eukaryota
- Kingdom: Animalia
- Phylum: Arthropoda
- Class: Insecta
- Order: Hymenoptera
- Family: Pompilidae
- Genus: Priochilus
- Species: P. captivum

Binomial name
- Priochilus captivum (Fabricius, 1804)

Species of wasp

Priochilus captivum is a species of neotropical spider wasp in the family Pompilidae. It is native to Central and South America. It was first described by the Danish zoologist Johan Christian Fabricius in 1804.

== Behaviour ==
Priochilus captivum is a solitary wasp and often nests on or around human habitations. Nesting sites chosen include among the folds of clothing, inside shoes, in cardboard boxes, behind books on shelves and in brick cavities. One female started nesting among bedclothes while the researcher was napping. The nest consists of a number of individual cells and is built of pieces of dry twigs and bits of gravel cemented together with mud. The number of cells in the nest ranges from two to seven. In Brazil, the nests are camouflaged with grass seeds, leaf fragments, animal hairs and insect remains, the outer walls are quite rough and the inside walls are smooth. In Trinidad, mud is the main building material and the nests are uncamouflaged. The individual cells are barrel-shaped, about 18 to 21 mm (0.7 to 0.8 in) long and 7 to 12 mm (0.3 to 0.5 in) wide. They are built on concealed horizontal surfaces and lie on their sides, touching each other, but not sharing a common wall.

The female wasp captures and immobilises a spider to provision each cell in the nest. In Brazil, a species of jumping spider (Salticidae) is often used. The spider is captured and stung, then laid on the ground while the female completes the cell. The mud takes about two hours to dry, and then the spider is placed inside, an egg is laid on its abdomen and the cell is sealed. The egg soon hatches and the wasp larva grows fast. By day five it has finished eating the abdomen of its spider host and by day nine it forms a cocoon. Males emerge through the seals of the cells at about day thirty while females emerge around ten days later. Adult wasps feed on nectar and honeydew.

== Distribution and habitat ==
This spider wasp is native to Central America and the northern part of South America. Its range includes the West Indies, Panama, and Brazil. In the latter country it is on the wing in the hot, rainy season, between September and April. In the laboratory, males live for about sixty days and females live for one hundred and twenty days.
