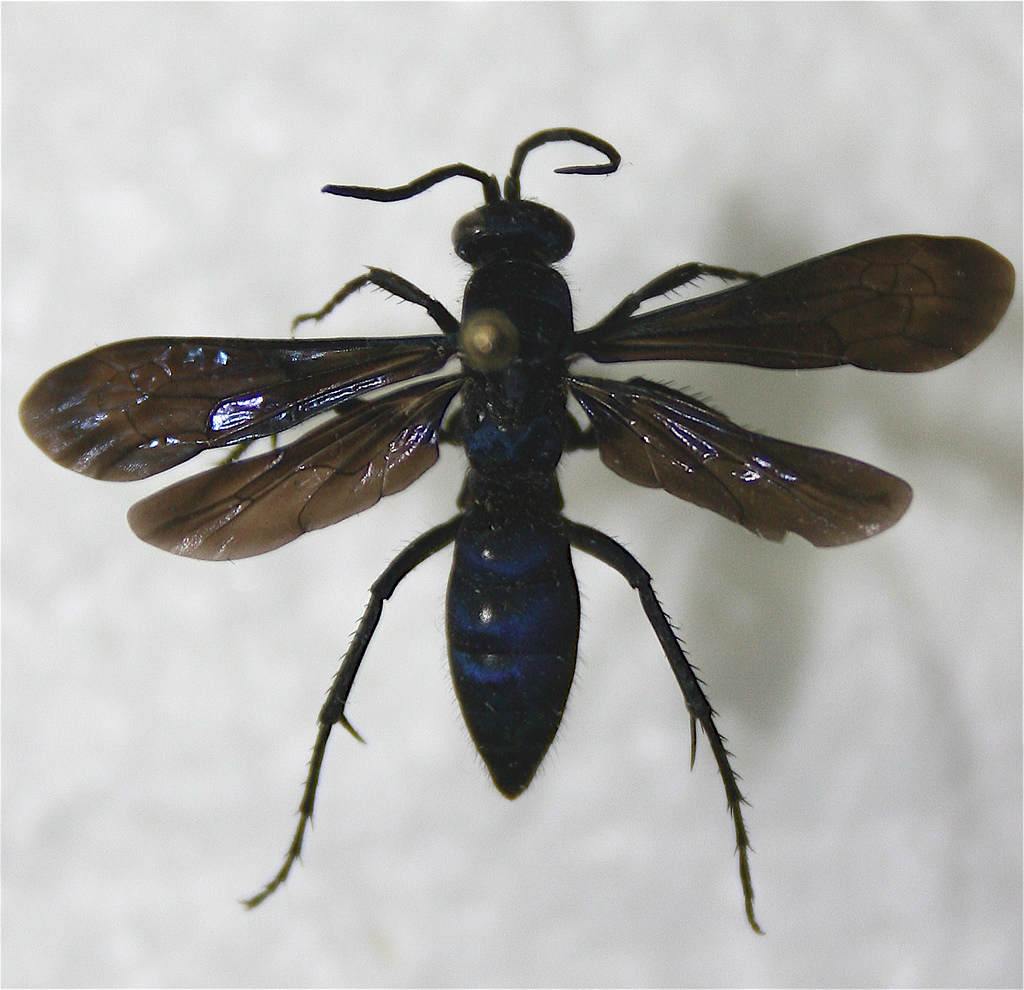

Scientific classification
- Domain: Eukaryota
- Kingdom: Animalia
- Phylum: Arthropoda
- Class: Insecta
- Order: Hymenoptera
- Family: Pompilidae
- Genus: Evagetes
- Species: E. ingenuus

Binomial name
- Evagetes ingenuus (Cresson, 1867)

= Evagetes ingenuus =

Species of wasp

Evagetes ingenuus is a species of spider wasp in the family Pompilidae.
