= Priochilus =

Scientific classification
- Domain: Eukaryota
- Kingdom: Animalia
- Phylum: Arthropoda
- Class: Insecta
- Order: Hymenoptera
- Family: Pompilidae
- Subfamily: Pompilinae
- Genus: Priochilus; Banks, 1944

Type species
- Pompilus nobilis (Fabricius, 1787)

Species
- Priochilus captivum (Fabricius, 1804)

Genus of wasps

Priochilus is a genus of neotropical spider wasp in the family Pompilidae.

== Species ==
The following species are currently classified in the genus Priochilus:

- Priochilus amabilis Banks, 1946
- Priochilus captivum (Fabricius, 1804)
- Priochilus chrysopygus Wasbauer, Cambra & Anino, 2017
- Priochilus diversus Smith
- Priochilus formosus Banks, 1944
- Priochilus fustiferum Evans, 1966
- Priochilus gloriosum (Cresson, 1869)
- Priochilus gracile Evans, 1966
- Priochilus gracilis Evans, 1966
- Priochilus gracillimus Smith, 1855
- Priochilus nigrocyaneus (Guerin, 1838)
- Priochilus nobilis (Fabricius, 1787)
- Priochilus nubilus Banks, 1946
- Priochilus peruanus Banks, 1946
- Priochilus plutonis Banks, 1944
- Priochilus regius (Fabricius, 1804)
- Priochilus ruficoxalis (Fox, 1897)
- Priochilus scrupulum (Fox, 1897)
- Priochilus scutellatus (Fox, 1897)
- Priochilus sericeifrons (Fox, 1897)
- Priochilus splendidulus (Fabricius, 1804)
- Priochilus superbus Banks, 1944
- Priochilus veraepacis (Cameron, 1893)
- Priochilus vitulinus (Dalla Torre, 1897)
