= Pseudopompilus =

Scientific classification
- Domain: Eukaryota
- Kingdom: Animalia
- Phylum: Arthropoda
- Class: Insecta
- Order: Hymenoptera
- Family: Pompilidae
- Genus: Pseudopompilus; Costa, 1887

Type species
- Pseudopompilus antonini Costa, 1887

Species
- See text

Genus of wasps

Pseudopompilus is a small genus of spider wasps in the subfamily Pompilinae and the tribe Psammoderini. which are found in southern Europe, the Middle East and southern Africa.

== Species ==
There are five species currently recognised in Pseudopompilus:

- Pseudopompilus antonini Costa, 1887
- Pseudopompilus funereus (Arnold, 1936) - Namibia, Zimbabwe
- Pseudopompilus humboldti (Dahlbom, 1845) - Italy, Greece, Turkey, Jordan, Israel, Egypt, Turkmenistan, Libya
- Pseudopompilus hyalinipennis (Arnold, 1935) - South Africa
- Pseudopompilus lacteipennis (Arnold, 1936) - South Africa
