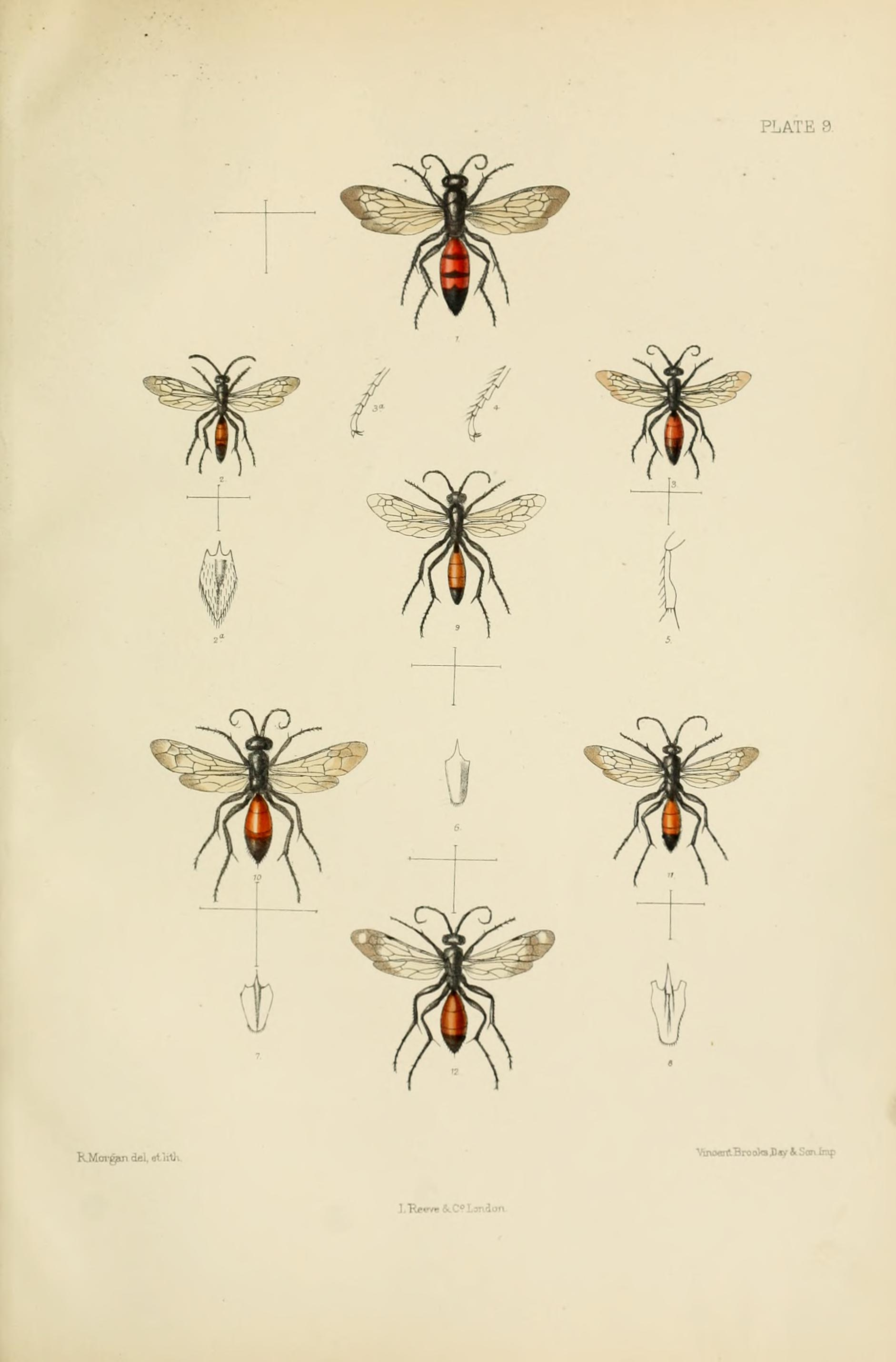

Scientific classification
- Domain: Eukaryota
- Kingdom: Animalia
- Phylum: Arthropoda
- Class: Insecta
- Order: Hymenoptera
- Family: Pompilidae
- Genus: Arachnospila
- Species: A. trivialis

Binomial name
- Arachnospila trivialis (Dahlbom, 1843)

Synonyms
- Pompilus trivialis; Ammosphex michalki; Pompilus aerumnatus; Pompilus insubricus; Psammochares corruptor; Pompilus peninsulanus

= Arachnospila trivialis =

Species of wasp

Arachnospila trivialis is a widespread spider wasp of sandy soil areas of the Palaearctic.

== Description ==
A medium-sized red and black spider wasp. The males have a quite distinctive genital plate, but females are very similar to other species assigned to the subgenus Ammosphex, such as A. anceps and considerable care is required to identify them.

== Distribution ==
Northern and central Europe, including southern and western areas of Great Britain, and across Asia to the Pacific.

== Biology ==
A trivialis is single brooded, flying from May to August. The only confirmed prey are spiders of the genus Xysticus and it may prey on wolf spiders of the family Lycosidae too. Apparently little appears to be known about A trivialis nesting biology, but like other Arachnospila species it is likely to excavate a nest in loose sand having already paralysed a spider and concealed it in nearby vegetation. Adults have been observed to visit the flowers of wild parsnip. A. trivialis will prey on spiders of both sexes while most spider wasps prefer to prey on females.
