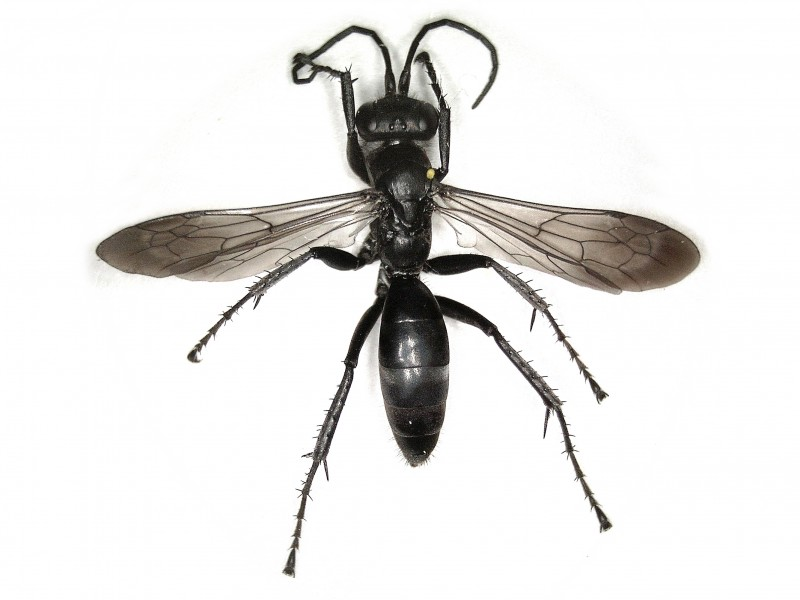

Scientific classification
- Kingdom: Animalia
- Phylum: Arthropoda
- Clade: Pancrustacea
- Class: Insecta
- Order: Hymenoptera
- Family: Pompilidae
- Genus: Pompilus
- Species: P. cinereus

Binomial name
- Pompilus cinereus Fabricius, 1798

Synonyms
- Aporoideus clarus Banks, 1940; Ferreola plumbea (Fabricius, 1775); Pepsis plumbea (Fabricius, 1787); Pompilus ami Tsuneki, 1989; Pompilus bunun Tsuneki, 1989; Pompilus chevrieri Tournier, 1889; Pompilus ithonus Cameron, 1908; Pompilus leprosus Dalla Torre, 1897; Pompilus placidus Priesner, 1968; Pompilus plumbeicolor Dalla Torre, 1897; Pompilus plumbeus Fabricius, 1787; Pompilus pruinosus Smith, 1879; Pompilus pulcher Fabricius, 1798; Pompilus sericeibalteatus Cameron, 1910; Pompilus tsou Tsuneki, 1989; Priochilus clarus (Banks, 1940); Psammochares plumbeus (Fabricius, 1787); Sericopompilus bivittatus Banks, 1934; Sphex cinerea Fabricius, 1775; Sphex cinereus Fabricius, 1775; Sphex plumbea Fabricius, 1787

= Pompilus cinereus =

Species of wasp

Pompilus cinereus, the leaden spider wasp, is the most widespread species of spider wasp in the genus Pompilus and is the only species of its genus throughout a large proportion of its wide distribution. It is the type species of the genus Pompilus and therefore also of the family Pompilidae.

== Distribution ==
It is widespread throughout the Old World, including Mediterranean islands, Canary Islands, Madagascar, Sri Lanka, Japan, the Philippines, Borneo, Java, and Australia. In Britain, it is mainly found in the south, but extends north to the central belt of Scotland.

== Variability ==
P. cinereus is a highly variable species throughout its wide range, giving rise to the large number of synonyms which have been attached to the species by different authors. Where it overlaps with congeners in southern and central Africa and in southern Asia, the phenotype is stable and it can be distinguished from the species with which it is sympatric. Over the rest of its huge range, it has no sympatric congeners and shows wide phenotypic variation.

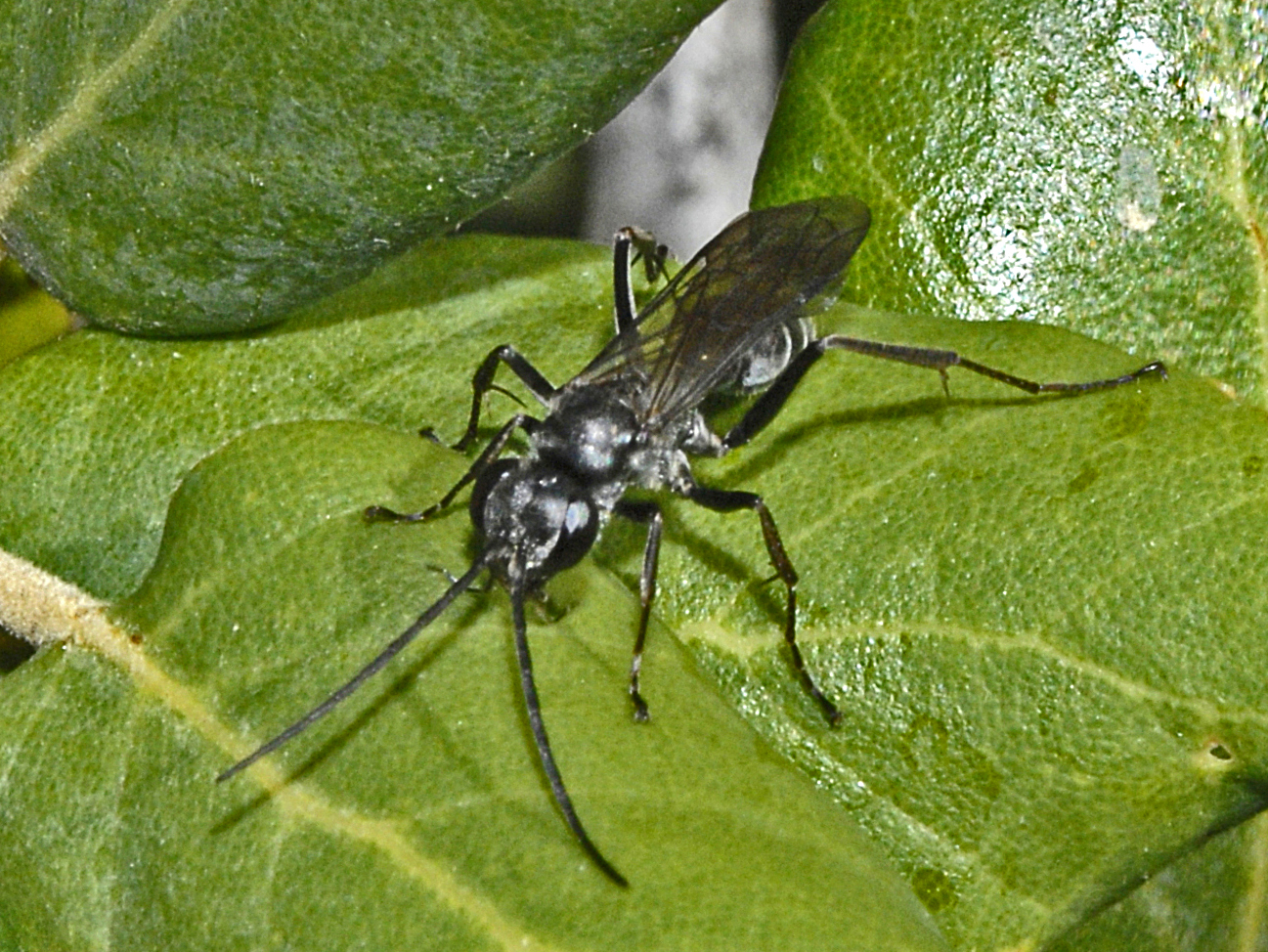
Male of Pompilus cinereus

For example, in western Europe, the females in north-western populations are predominantly black, pubescent dorsally with narrow transverse strips of grey at the rear of each tergum, interrupted medially. The face is dark above the antennae and grey below. Some of the specimens taken in Gotland, Sweden, are black with dark brown pubescence posteriorly on the abdomen, or with a little grey on that of others; these specimens are the basis of the 'subspecies' P. plumbeus gotlandicus Wolf. In northern Iberia, a dark form which is nearly identical with the form found around the North Sea and Baltic littoral is found, but with the face narrower above. In southern Portugal, individuals that are almost entirely black and were named as the subspecies P. c. lusitanicus are found and these are found in sympatry with more normally grey individuals previously regarded as P. c. plumbeus which is the characteristic form of south-east Spain and the rest of the Mediterranean. This type of phenotypic variability is found throughout the species range. Day (1981) treats P. cinereus as a monotypic species despite this wide variation across its range.

== Habitat ==
It is found in coastal dunes and sandy river beds and banks. P. cinereus shows a distinct preference for loose sand and may be abundant in sheltered, sunny areas in dune systems.

== Biology ==
In northwestern Europe, spiders of the family Lycosidae are the most frequent prey for P. cinereus, spiders of the families Gnaphosidae, Miturgidae, Clubionidae, Pisauridae, and Thomisidae have also been recorded as prey, albeit with much less frequency than Lycosidae. P. cinereus locates in the sand or encounters on the surface a prey individual which is stung into immobility. The prey is then transported by the wasp, which holds the prey in its mandibles and walks forwards. Most frequently, the prey is temporarily interred whilst a suitable nest site is sought and a burrow excavated. Significant time and effort may be spent on trial burrows before a site is finally selected. When the nest is complete, the prey may be taken to the entrance and carried in. The prey spider is carried into a terminal cell big enough to accommodate both wasp and prey. The egg is laid on the upper forward part the prey's abdomen. The wasp then closes the burrow, pulling in the walls and roof with its mandibles and then tamping the soil with the tip of the abdomen. The spider in the cell recovers from paralysis some time between 3 and 6 hours after being stung and begins to walk aimlessly about the cell, spinning silk continuously resulting in a silk-lined cell of considerable structural integrity. After three days, the small larva emerges from the egg and begins to consume the trapped spider, killing it by consuming its abdomen.

P. cinereus is ecologically versatile and takes a wide variety of prey and is the dominant pompilid spider wasp in many parts of its range. The smaller males hatch from unfertilised eggs (like other in Hymenoptera) and are provisioned with smaller spider prey than female eggs.
