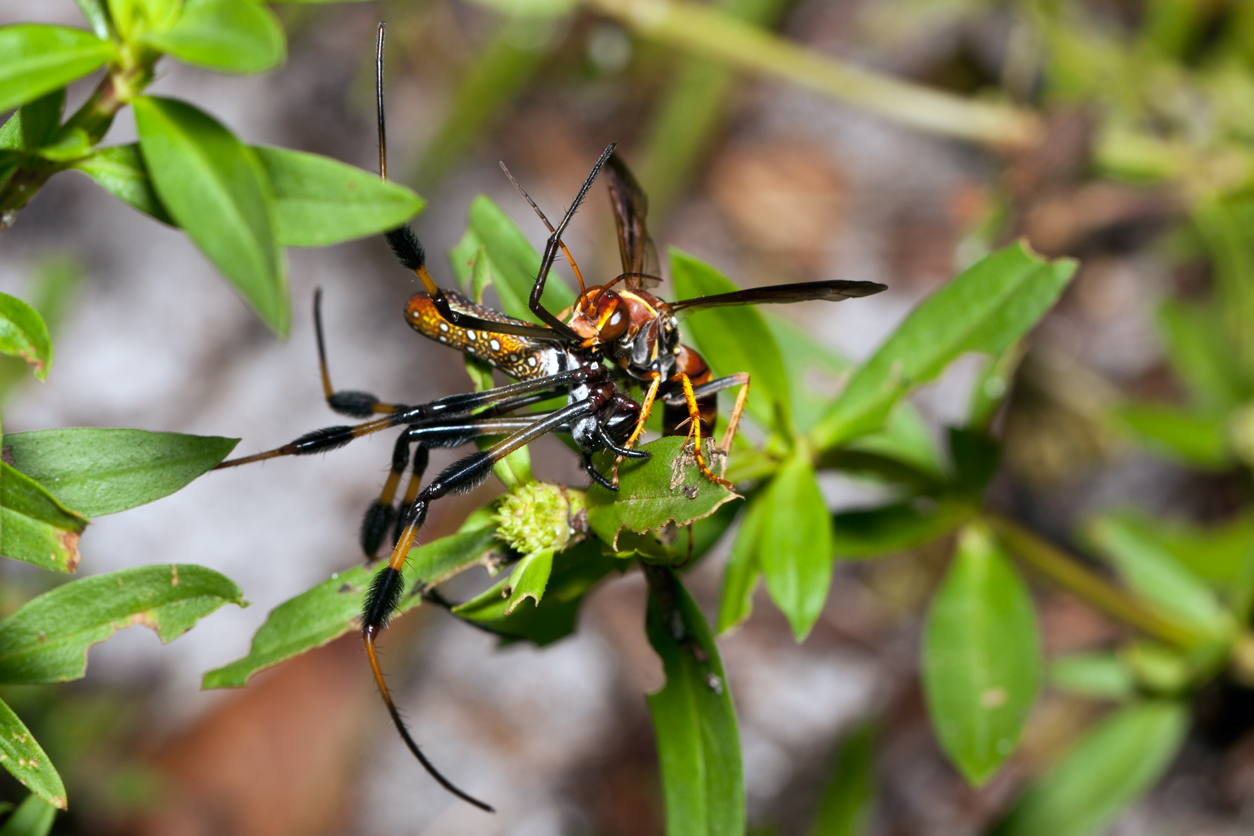

Scientific classification
- Kingdom: Animalia
- Phylum: Arthropoda
- Clade: Pancrustacea
- Class: Insecta
- Order: Hymenoptera
- Family: Pompilidae
- Genus: Poecilopompilus
- Species: P. interruptus

Binomial name
- Poecilopompilus interruptus (Say, 1834)

Synonyms
- Ceropales interrupta Say, 1835; Pompilus navua Cresson, 1867; Pompilus ichneumoniformis Patton, 1879; Pompilus ichneumonoides Dalla Torre, 1897

= Poecilopompilus interruptus =

Species of wasp

Poecilopompilus interruptus is a species of New World spider wasps.

== Description ==
A highly variable spider wasp, which is 13 mm in length. P. interruptus has long orange antennae, bold rufous-brown and yellow bands on the mesosoma with yellow and brown markings on the thorax. Its legs are brown and yellow and the wasp's wings are brown. The amount of red, brown and yellow markings shows great individual variation. The antennae of males are straight or gently curved while females have antennae that curl at the ends. Poecilopompilus wasps may be a Müllerian mimics of various wasp species and this species appears to mimic paper wasps of the genus Polistes. To distinguish this species from P. algidus the observer needs to examine the spines on the front tarsi of females and the inner margin of the eyes, P. interruptus females have four weak spines on the front tarsi in females and parallel inner eye margins while P. algidus has three strong spines and shows convergent inner eye margins.

== Biology ==
In California female Poecilopompilus interruptus have been collected on extrafloral nectaries of Gossypium hirsutum and both sexes captured at extrafloral nectaries of Helianthus annuus. Flowers visited include Chrysothamnus sp., Medicago sativa, Psilostrophe cooperi, Wislizenia refracta, Eriogonum fasciculatum, Eriogonum thomasii, Ribes aureum, Acacia angustissima and Penstemon rydbergii. There is some evidence that females feed on occasion on haemolymph of captured spiders (Evans and Yoshimoto, 1962). The main prey taken consists of spiders of the family Araneidae.

== Subspecies and distribution ==
There are four recognised subspecies:

- Poecilopompilus interruptus interruptus (Say) From southern California east and north to and south through Mexico to Chiapas.
- Poecilopompilus interruptus cressoni (Banks) north eastern states of the United States and south eastern Canada
- Poecilopompilus interruptus dubitatis (Cameron) eastern Mexico south to Panama.
- Poecilopompilus interruptus semiflavus Evans Confined to the central valley of California.
