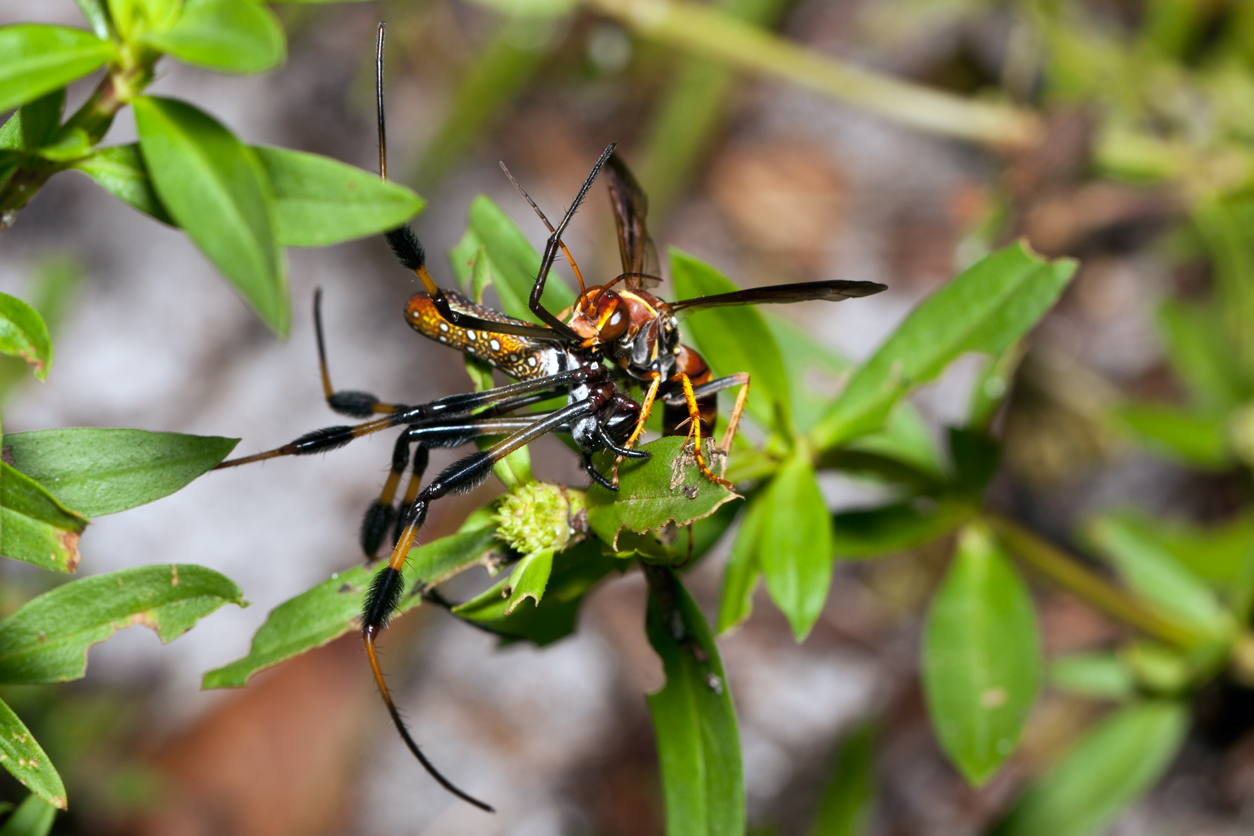
- A Poecilopompilus spider wasp dragging a paralyzed golden silk orb-weaver (Nephila) in South Florida
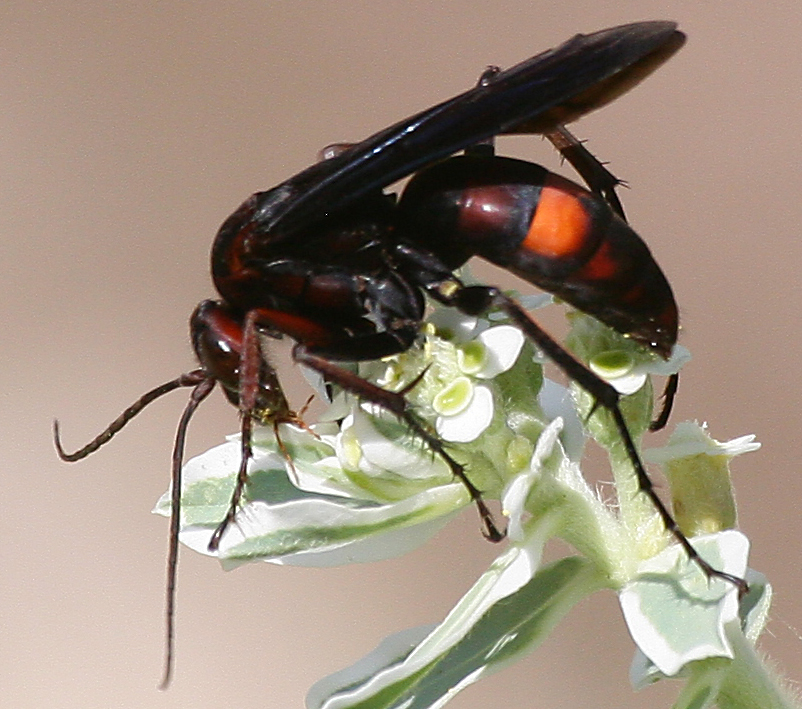
- P. algidus

Scientific classification
- Kingdom: Animalia
- Phylum: Arthropoda
- Class: Insecta
- Order: Hymenoptera
- Family: Pompilidae
- Subfamily: Pompilinae
- Genus: Poecilopompilus; Ashmead, 1902

Type species
- Pompilus navus Cresson, 1867

= Poecilopompilus =

Genus of wasps

Poecilopompilus is a fossorial genus of the family Pomplidae found in the New World. The main prey of these wasps are spiders of the family Araneidae.

== Species ==
There are 37 currently recognised species in Poecilopompilus. These include:

- Poecilopompilus algidus (Smith, 1855)
- Poecilopompilus annulatus (Fabricius, 1793)
- Poecilopompilus apicalis (Banks, 1947)
- Poecilopompilus autrani (Holmberg)
- Poecilopompilus badius Evans, 1966
- Poecilopompilus costatus (Taschenberg)
- Poecilopompilus decedens (Smith, 1873)
- Poecilopompilus eurymelus (Banks, 1947)
- Poecilopompilus exquisitus (Fox)
- Poecilopompilus familiaris (Smith)
- Poecilopompilus flavopictus(Smith)
- Poecilopompilus interruptus (Say, 1835)
- Poecilopompilus maculifrons (Smith, 1873)
- Poecilopompilus mixtus (Fabricius, 1798)
- Poecilopompilus polistoides (Smith)
- Poecilopompilus rubricatus (Smith, 1879)
- Poecilopompilus ventralis (Banks, 1947)
