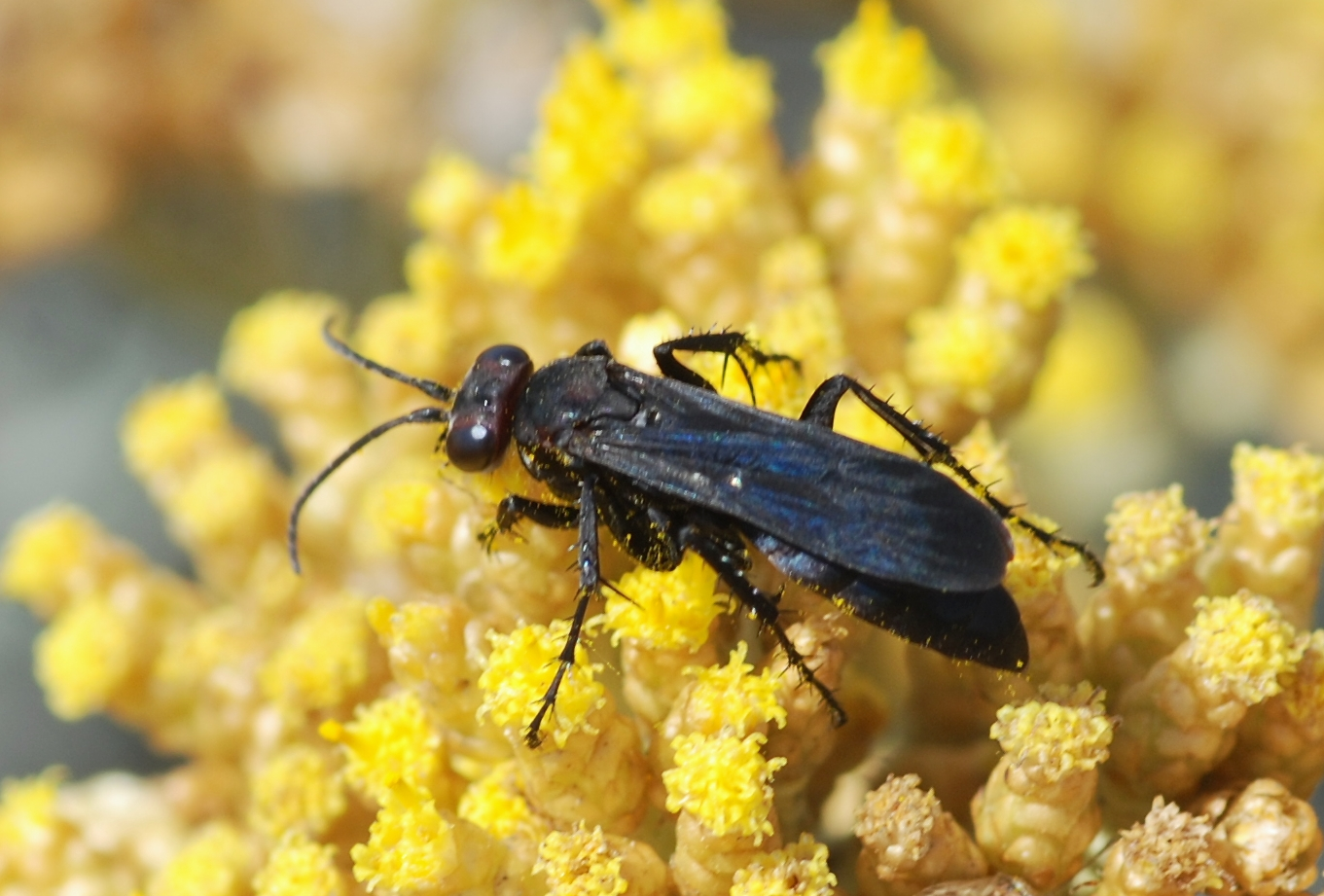

Scientific classification
- Kingdom: Animalia
- Phylum: Arthropoda
- Class: Insecta
- Order: Hymenoptera
- Family: Pompilidae
- Genus: Agenioideus; Ashmead, 1902

Type species
- Pompilus humilis Cresson, 1867

= Agenioideus =

Genus of wasps

Agenioideus is a genus of spider wasps from the subfamily Pompilinae; the genus occurs in Europe, where 21 species are recorded, eastwards to Japan, in North America, South America, and Australia.

== Selected species ==
- Agenioideus acconeus (Banks, 1947)
- Agenioideus apicalis (Vander Linden, 1827)
- Agenioideus arenicolus (Priesner, 1955)
- Agenioideus biedermani (Banks, 1910)
- Agenioideus birkmanni (Banks, 1910)
- Agenioideus ciliatus (Lepeletier, 1845)
- Agenioideus cinctellus (Spinola, 1808)
- Agenioideus coronatus (Nouvel & Ribaut, 1958)
- Agenioideus dichrous (Brulle, 1840)
- Agenioideus excisus (Morawitz, 1890)
- Agenioideus expulsus Turner 1917
- Agenioideus fascinubecula Wolf, 1986
- Agenioideus fertoni (Saunders, 1901)
- Agenioideus gentilis (Klug, 1834)
- Agenioideus humilis (Cresson, 1867)
- Agenioideus injudicatus Junco y Reyes, 1960
- Agenioideus ishikawai Shimizu, 1989
- Agenioideus kerkyrus Wolf, 1985
- Agenioideus kokya Shimizu & Wahis, 2009
- Agenioideus maculipes (Smith, 1870)
- Agenioideus minutus (Banks, 1947)
- Agenioideus nigricornis (Fabricius), 1775
- Agenioideus nubecula (Costa, 1874)
- Agenioideus poultoni (Saunders, 1904)
- Agenioideus rhodosoma (Kohl, 1886)
- Agenioideus ruficeps (Eversmann, 1849)
- Agenioideus rytiphorus (Kohl, 1886)
- Agenioideus seminiger (Taschenberg, 1880)
- Agenioideus sericeus (Vander Linden, 1827)
- Agenioideus tussaci Wolf, 1986
- Agenioideus usurarius (Tournier, 1889)
