= Homonotus =

Scientific classification
- Domain: Eukaryota
- Kingdom: Animalia
- Phylum: Arthropoda
- Class: Insecta
- Order: Hymenoptera
- Family: Pompilidae
- Subfamily: Pompilinae
- Genus: Homonotus; Dahlbom, 1843

Type species
- Sphex sanguinolentus Fabricius, 1793

Genus of wasps

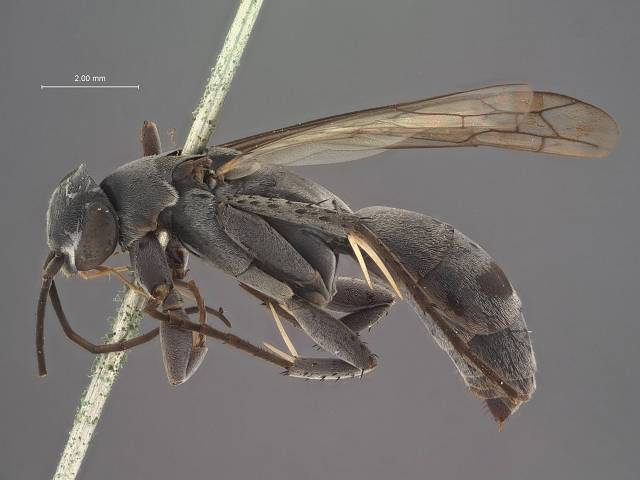

Homonotus is a genus of spider hunting wasps with an old world distribution, mainly in Africa.

Species in the genus include

- Homonotus aegyptiacus Turner, 1917
- Homonotus coxalis Dahlbom, 1843
- Homonotus disparilis Turner, 1917
- Homonotus dispersus Dahlbom, 1843
- Homonotus dissectus Dahlbom, 1843
- Homonotus formosanus Yasumatsu 1933
- Homonotus fuscipes Dahlbom, 1843
- Homonotus imitans Dahlbom, 1843
- Homonotus iwatai Yasumatsu 1932
- Homonotus leptogaster Dahlbom, 1843
- Homonotus okinawanus Tsuneki 1990
- Homonotus ruficornis Cameron, 1905
- Homonotus rukwaensis Arnold, 1946
- Homonotus sanguinolentus (Fabricius, 1793)
- Homonotus sansibaricus Dahlbom, 1843
- Homonotus semiflavus Priesner 1955
- Homonotus tagalicus Banks 1934
- Homonotus taiwanus Tsuneki 1990
