= Paracyphononyx =

Scientific classification
- Domain: Eukaryota
- Kingdom: Animalia
- Phylum: Arthropoda
- Class: Insecta
- Order: Hymenoptera
- Family: Pompilidae
- Subfamily: Pompilinae
- Genus: Paracyphononyx; Gribodo, 1884

Type species
- Paracyphononyx melanicrus Gribodo, 1884

Genus of wasps

Paracyphononyx is a genus of spider wasps distributed in the tropics and warmer temperate regions; they differ from other pompilids in that they do not permanently disable the host spider but allow the spider to resume activity after the wasp has laid its egg on the spider while the wasp larva exists as koinobiont ectoparasitoid of the spider.

== Species ==
There are 51 species currently recognised in Paracophonyx and some of these are listed below with the areas where they have been recorded from.

- Paracyphononyx affinis Haupt, 1929 Cameroon, Ghana, Uganda, Ecuador
- Paracyphononyx africanus Rad., 1881 Angola, Democratic Republic of Congo, Uganda, Zimbabwe
- Paracyphononyx alienus Smith, 1879 Japan
- Paracyphononyx amoenissimus Dalla Torre Brazil
- Paracyphononyx ater Priesner, 1955 Egypt
- Paracyphononyx capensis Arnold, 1959 South Africa
- Paracyphononyx carinatus Rad., 1881 Angola, Sierra Leone, South Africa, Zimbabwe
- Paracyphononyx coloratus Haupt, 1929 Cameroon
- Paracyphononyx consimilis Smith, 1879 Australia
- Paracyphononyx diabolicus Holmberg Brazil, Paraguay, Argentina
- Paracyphononyx difficilis Bischoff, 1913 Mali, South Africa, Uganda, Zimbabwe)
- Paracyphononyx diversipes Arnold, 1962 Zimbabwe
- Paracyphononyx diversus Dahlbom, 1845 Central and East Africa to South Africa, Yemen
- Paracyphononyx elliotti Saussure Madagascar
- Paracyphononyx fairchildi Banks, 1947 Brazil
- Paracyphononyx frustratus Smith, 1879 South Africa, Uganda, Zimbabwe
- Paracyphononyx funebris Magretti, 1884 Ethiopia
- Paracyphononyx funereus Lepeletier, 1845 eastern and central United States of America
- Paracyphononyx furibundus Kohl, 1894 Central Asia
- Paracyphononyx gemellus Arnold, 1936 South Africa, Zimbabwe
- Paracyphononyx incalis Banks, 1947 Peru
- Paracyphononyx incognitus Cameron, 1891 Philippines
- Paracyphononyx laboriosus Arnold, 1936 Ethiopia, South Africa
- Paracyphononyx languidus Haupt, 1929 South Africa, Zimbabwe
- Paracyphononyx metemmensis Magretti, 1884 Ghana, Mali, South Africa, Zimbabwe
- Paracyphononyx minor Banks, 1947 Brazil
- Paracyphononyx mombassicus R. Luc., 1898 Kenya
- Paracyphononyx montanus Arnold, 1960 South Africa
- Paracyphononyx neriene Banks, 1947 Argentina
- Paracyphononyx parallelus Haupt, 1929 Democratic Republic of Congo, South Africa
- Paracyphononyx pedestris Smith, 1885 Philippines
- Paracyphononyx petiolaris Saussure, 1891 Madagascar
- Paracyphononyx plutonis Banks, 1940 Madagascar
- Paracyphononyx rothneyi Cameron, 1891 India
- Paracyphononyx rotundinervis Cameron, 1910 Ethiopia, Tanzania, Uganda
- Paracyphononyx ruficrus Klug, 1834 Asia Minor, Egypt, South Africa, Yemen, Zimbabwe
- Paracyphononyx scapulatus Brethes, South America
- Paracyphononyx semiplumbeus Taschenberg, 1869 Brazil, Argentina
- Paracyphononyx sericeus Banks, 1947 Brazil
- Paracyphononyx serraticornis Taschenberg, Brazil
- Paracyphononyx sulcatus Fox, Brazil
- Paracyphononyx unicolor Smith, 1879 Panama
- Paracyphononyx vivax Cameron, 1891 India
- Paracyphononyx wroughtoni Cameron, 1891 India
- Paracyphononyx zavattarii Guiglia, 1943 Canary Islands
- Paracyphononyx zonatus Illiger, 1802 Mali, South Africa, Zimbabwe
