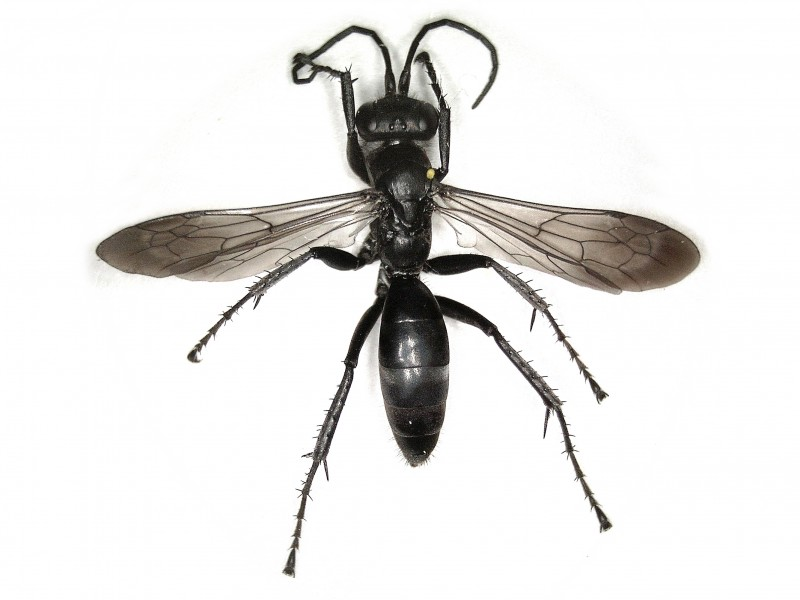
- Pompilus cinereus

Scientific classification
- Kingdom: Animalia
- Phylum: Arthropoda
- Clade: Pancrustacea
- Class: Insecta
- Order: Hymenoptera
- Family: Pompilidae
- Subfamily: Pompilinae
- Genus: Pompilus; Fabricius, 1798

Type species
- Pompilus pulcher Fabricius, 1798

= Pompilus (wasp) =

Genus of wasps

Pompilus is a genus of spider wasps in the family Pompilidae, the members of which prey on spiders. There are seven species recognised in Pompilus sensu stricto. It is the type genus of the family Pompilidae and the subfamily Pompilinae.

== Biology ==
Pompilus wasps are fossorial, stocking short burrows in sand with single spiders of various families upon which they lay a single egg.

== Distribution ==
The members of Pompilus are widely distributed throughout the Old World, in both temperate and tropical regions, but with the greatest diversity in Africa.

The species are:

- Pompilus accolens Cresson, 1869
- Pompilus bilineatus (Arnold 1937)
- Pompilus botswana Day, 1972
- Pompilus cadmius Saussure, 1892
- Pompilus cinereus (Fabricius, 1775)
- Pompilus irpex Gerstaecker, 1858
- Pompilus mirandus (Saussure, 1867)
- Pompilus niveus Saunders, 1901
- Pompilus tripunctatus Spinola, 1808
