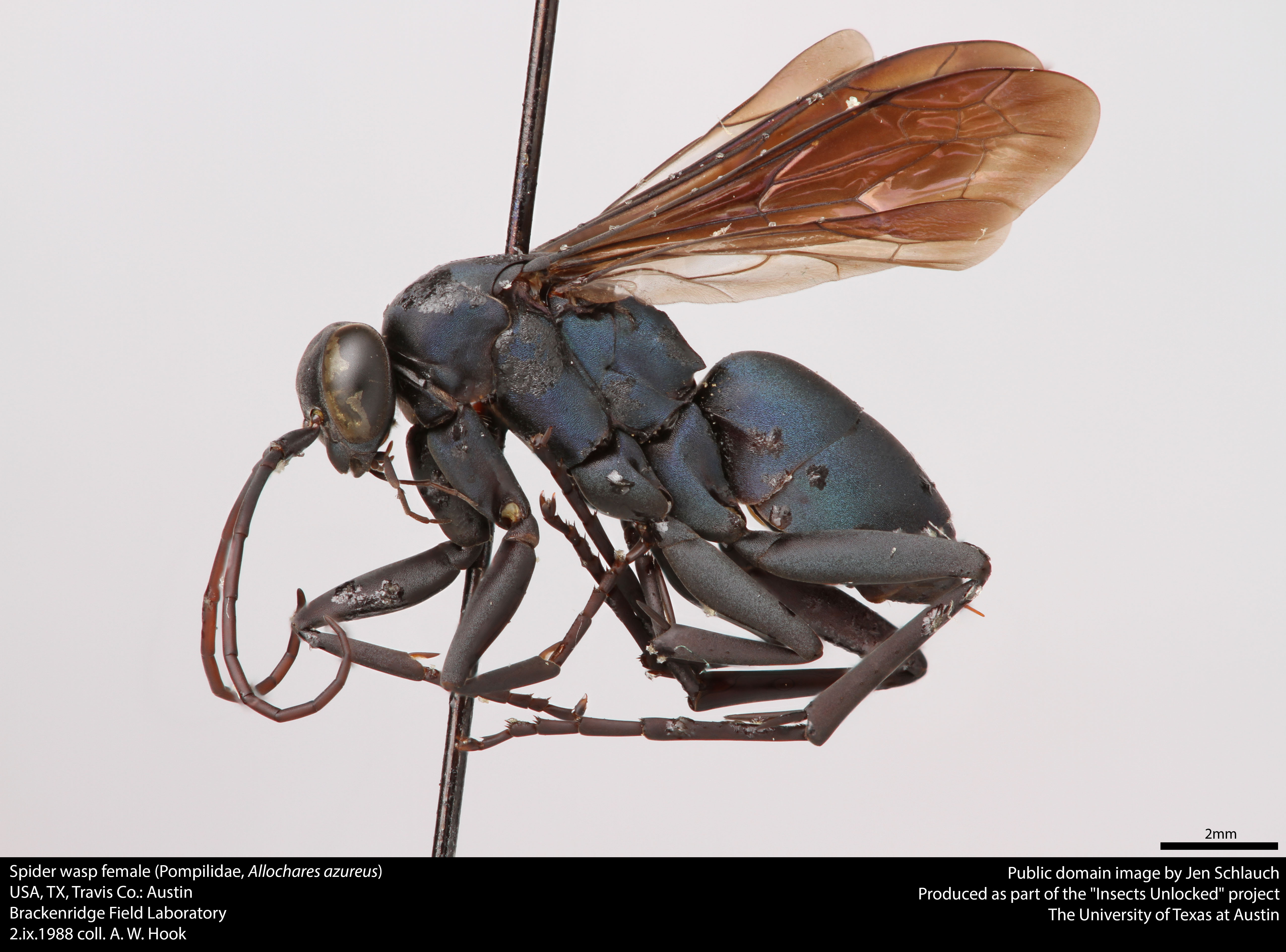
- Female

Scientific classification
- Domain: Eukaryota
- Kingdom: Animalia
- Phylum: Arthropoda
- Class: Insecta
- Order: Hymenoptera
- Family: Pompilidae
- Genus: Allochares; Banks, 1917
- Species: A. azureus

Binomial name
- Allochares azureus (Cresson, 1867)

Synonyms
- Allochares bruesi Banks, 1917; Pompilus azureus (Cresson, 1867); Pompilus sinaloae Cameron, 1893; Pseudagenia azurea Cresson, 1867

= Allochares azureus =

Species of wasp

Allochares azureus is a species of spider wasp from the family Pompilidae, it is the only member of the monotypic genus Allochares. It occurs in the southern part of North America and is a specialist parasitoid of the Southern house spider.

== Description ==
Allochares azureus is a distinctive species of spider wasp, especially in the shape of the head which is convex in the front and concave in its rear, this is especially marked in the males. It also has a characteristic excavated propodeum which has conical teeth pointing towards the wasp's posterior. The females lack a tarsal comb. The body of the wasp is black but the short hairs cause it to have blue or green iridescence. The females measure 9–13.5mm on length and the males 7-10mm.

== Distribution ==
Allochares azureus is found only in the southern part of the Nearctic realm in the most southern parts of the United States from Florida to California south to the Mexivan states of Jalisco and Veracruz.

== Biology ==
Allochares azureus has a distinctive biology among spider wasps. Following mating the female hunts for a southern house spider (Kukulcania hibernalis). Searching for prey on foot with short rapid rushes and flicking of wings, it will make short flights of a metre or so between hunting sites. Once a spider is found the wasp moves to the centre of the web where the spider has a tube like retreat which the wasp enters. The spider reacts to the wasp by retreating away from its web and finding a hiding place in a fissure or another spider's web where it hides and tries to remain motionless, the wasp seems unable to detect the spider so long as it is still. The wasp continues to search and if it touches the spider, the spider will try to retreat and the wasp will pursue it. The lack of spines and modified tarsal claws shown by A. azureus appear to be an adaptation to this as their presence could probably cause the wasp to get tangled in the velcro like threads of the spider's web. The female attacks the spider from behind, sometimes flipping it on its back and paralyses the spider with a sting in the venter . The paralysed spider is then dragged, sometimes vertically, back to its web or to another unoccupied web and is secured in the web by the female using the spider's own silk strands to wrap it in and lays an egg on it. The egg hatches in 2–3 days, the larva the feeds on the spider for 10–12 days before it pupates in the web, building a distinct cocoon which has its outer surface covered in long silky hairs. This species has a number of generations in a year. The adults have been observed or caught feeding on flowers of Baccharis and Solidago, and also Acacia, Asclepias, Condalia, Hyptis emoryi and Colubrina texensis.
