= Aporinellus =

Scientific classification
- Kingdom: Animalia
- Phylum: Arthropoda
- Clade: Pancrustacea
- Class: Insecta
- Order: Hymenoptera
- Family: Pompilidae
- Genus: Aporinellus; Banks, 1911

Genus of insects

Spider Wasp (Pompilidae, Aporinellus medianus)

Aporinellus is a genus of insects belonging to the family Pompilidae.

The species of this genus are found in Europe, Southeastern Asia and North America.

Species:

- Aporinellus albipennis Priesner, 1960
- Aporinellus albofasciatus (Radoszkowski, 1877)
- Aporinellus apicatus Evans, 1951
- Aporinellus apicipennis (Brèthes, 1911)
- Aporinellus atristylus (Saussure, 1890)
- Aporinellus basalis Banks, 1933
- Aporinellus bidens (Saussure, 1890)
- Aporinellus borregoensis Evans, 1957
- Aporinellus cahirensis Priesner, 1960
- Aporinellus cinereofasciatus (Radoszkowski, 1887)
- Aporinellus completus Banks, 1917
- Aporinellus differens (Haupt, 1929)
- Aporinellus fasciatus (Smith, 1855)
- Aporinellus ferrugineipes Guig., 1943
- Aporinellus fucatus (Kohl, 1905)
- Aporinellus gussakovskyi (Bradley, 1944)
- Aporinellus hecate (Cameron, 1891)
- Aporinellus ilus (Bingham, 1893)
- Aporinellus kiritschenkoi Gussakovskij, 1955
- Aporinellus medianus Banks, 1917
- Aporinellus moestus (Klug, 1834)
- Aporinellus philippinensis Tsuneki, 1988
- Aporinellus pulcher Radoszkowski, 1887
- Aporinellus rhodesianus (Bischoff, 1913)
- Aporinellus sexmaculatus (Spinola, 1806)
- Aporinellus speca Schmid-Egger
- Aporinellus specb Schmid-Egger
- Aporinellus vanharteni Schmid-Egger, 2017
- Aporinellus yucatanensis (Cameron, 1893)
