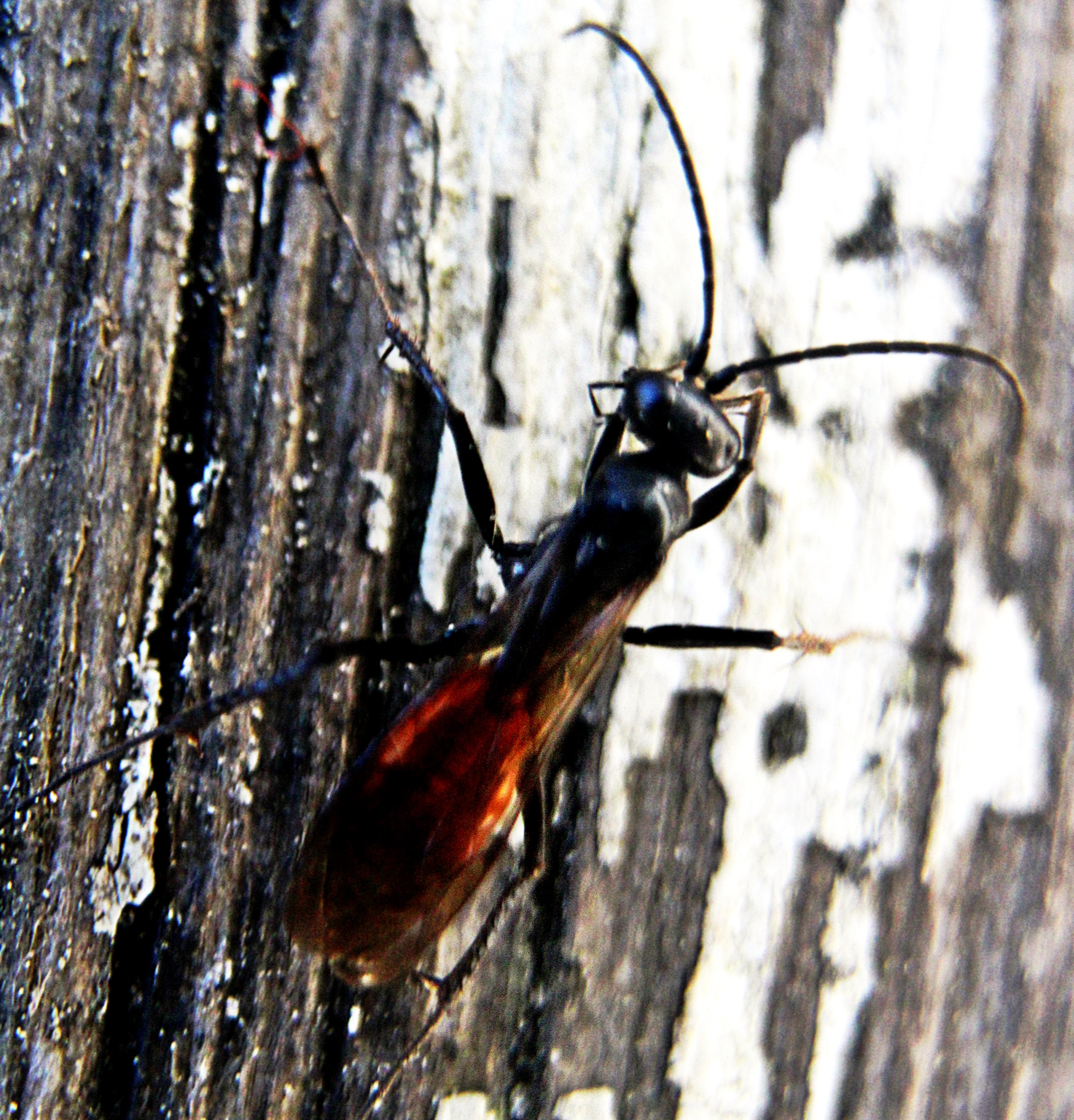

Scientific classification
- Domain: Eukaryota
- Kingdom: Animalia
- Phylum: Arthropoda
- Class: Insecta
- Order: Hymenoptera
- Family: Pompilidae
- Genus: Arachnospila
- Species: A. anceps

Binomial name
- Arachnospila anceps (Wesmael, 1851)

Synonyms
- Pompilus anceps; Pompilus krombachi; Pompilus cyrnus; Pompilus expletus; Pompilus navus; Pompilus peninsulanus; Pompilus radiosus; Pompilus saxaeus; Arachnospila serica; Pompilus unguicularis; Sphex vagus

= Arachnospila anceps =

Species of wasp

Arachnospila anceps is one of the more common spider wasps of western Europe.

== Description ==
A. anceps is a medium-sized, black and red spider wasp.

== Distribution ==
This species is found in northern and central Europe, including most of Britain and Ireland, and in Asia east to Mongolia.

== Biology ==
The flight period is May to September and the species is probably univoltine. A wide range of spiders are taken as prey; the families Lycosidae, Clubionidae and Thomisidae have been recorded and Gnaphosidae and Agelenidae are also possible prey. The spider is paralysed before being dragged backwards to the nest site where it is hidden on a plant while the burrow is rapidly excavated. It occurs in a variety of habitats and on most soils with the possible exception of heavy clay soils. There are no records of which flowers are visited by A. anceps for nectar.
