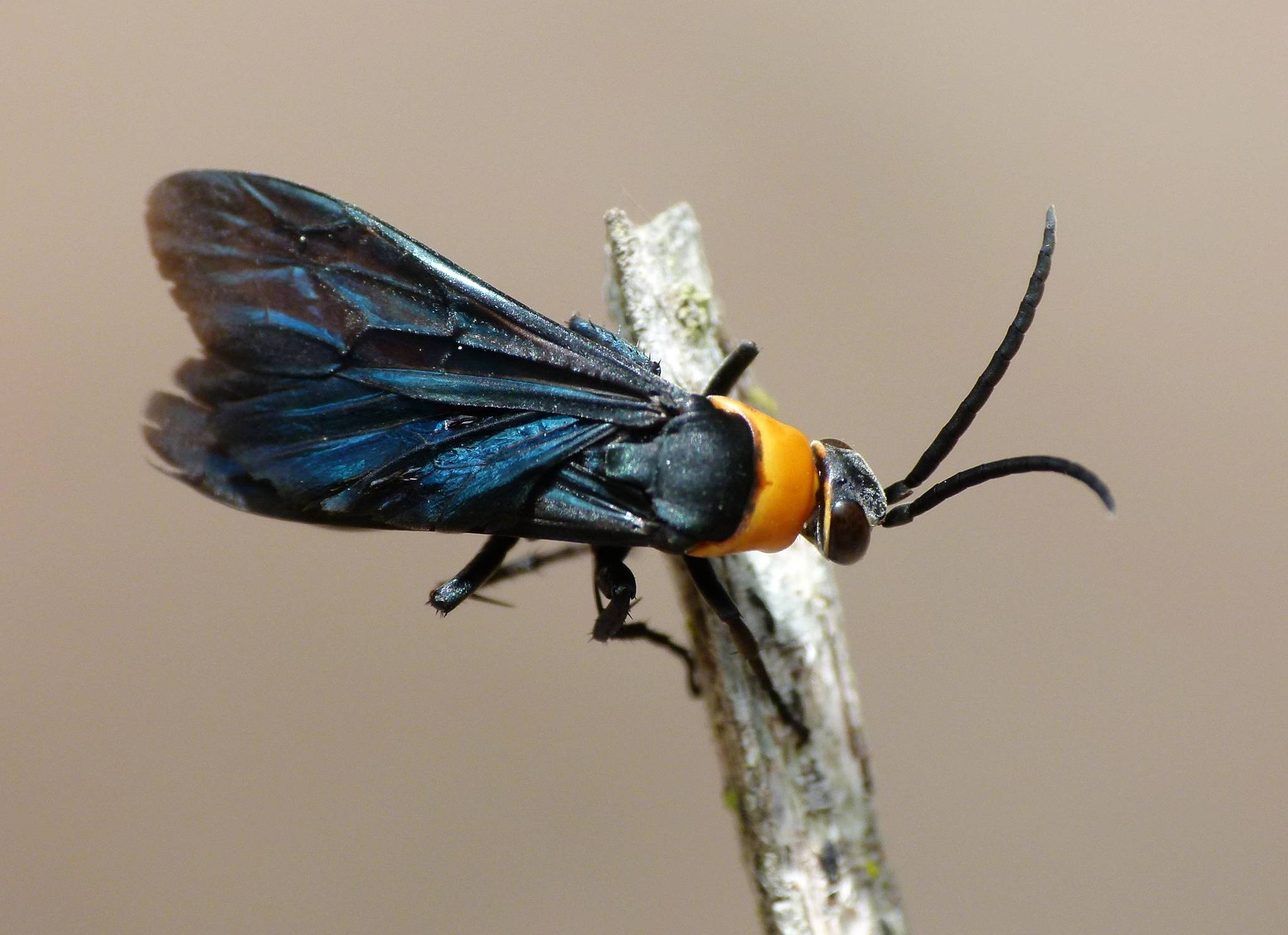
- Ferreola handschini (Orange-collared spider wasp)

Scientific classification
- Kingdom: Animalia
- Phylum: Arthropoda
- Class: Insecta
- Order: Hymenoptera
- Family: Pompilidae
- Genus: Ferreola; Lepeletier, 1845

= Ferreola (wasp) =

Genus of wasps

Ferreola is a genus of wasps belonging to the family Pompilidae.

The genus has almost cosmopolitan distribution.

Species:

- Ferreola algira Lepeletier, 1845
- Ferreola auranticornis Wahis, 2000
- Ferreola algira Lepeletier, 1845
- Ferreola alraeesii Schmid-Egger & Al-Jahdhami, 2018
- Ferreola alwahaibii Schmid-Egger & Al-Jahdhami, 2018
- Ferreola auranticornis Wahis, 2000
- Ferreola bakeri Banks, 1938
- Ferreola barrei (Radoszkowski, 1893)
- Ferreola cameroni (Bingham, 1893)
- Ferreola carbonaria Walker, 1871
- Ferreola cephalotes (Saussure, 1868)
- Ferreola circe (Cameron, 1891)
- Ferreola clypealis Banks, 1934
- Ferreola collarella Evans, 1982
- Ferreola dentata (Gussakovskij, 1930)
- Ferreola denticulata Taschenberg, 1869
- Ferreola diffinis (Lepeletier, 1845)
- Ferreola dimidiatipennis Saussure, 1868
- Ferreola divisus (Walker, 1871)
- Ferreola elegans (Priesner, 1955)
- Ferreola erythrocephala (Guérin, 1844)
- Ferreola frontalis (Fabricius, 1775)
- Ferreola greenii Bingham, 1890
- Ferreola haladai Schmid-Egger, 2018
- Ferreola handschini (Haupt, 1935)
- Ferreola hirayamae (Matsumura & Uchida, 1926)
- Ferreola ilanensis Tsuneki, 1989
- Ferreola insolita Wahis & Terzo, 1996
- Ferreola komarowii Radoszkowski, 1888
- Ferreola orchesica (Kohl, 1886)
- Ferreola parvula (Haupt, 1962)
- Ferreola paulyi Wahis, 2000
- Ferreola plumbea Saussure, 1867
- Ferreola pseudodenticulata Schmid-Egger, 2018
- Ferreola purpureopruinosa (Cameron, 1912)
- Ferreola pygmaeus (Priesner, 1955)
- Ferreola saussurei (Banks, 1941)
- Ferreola schioedtei (Dahlbom, 1845)
- Ferreola striata (Radoszkowski, 1888)
- Ferreola symmetria Wahis, 2000
- Ferreola tagalica Banks, 1934
- Ferreola taiwana Tsuneki, 1989
- Ferreola thoracica (Fabricius)
- Ferreola tricolor Saussure, 1868
- Ferreola tunesiensis Schmid-Egger, 2018
- Ferreola urenae Wahis, 2000
- Ferreola violacea Banks, 1934
- Ferreola zebrata Saussure, 1868
