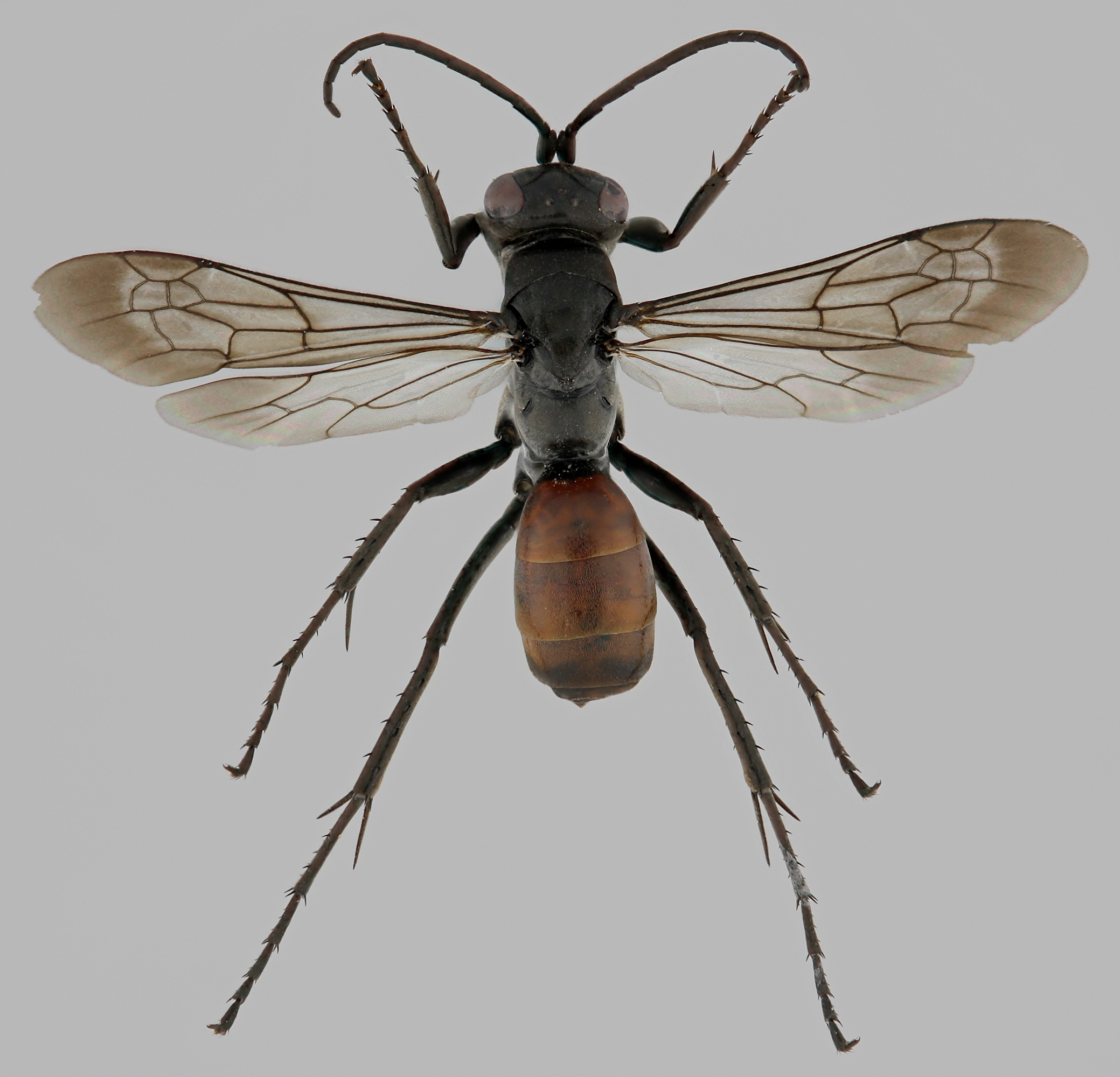
- Arachnospila spissa

Scientific classification
- Kingdom: Animalia
- Phylum: Arthropoda
- Class: Insecta
- Order: Hymenoptera
- Family: Pompilidae
- Genus: Arachnospila; Kincaid, 1900

Type species
- Arachnospila septentrionalis Kincaid, 1900

= Arachnospila =

Genus of wasps

Arachnospila is a predominantly Holarctic genus of spider wasps, with limited representation in montane habitats in Neotropical and Afrotropical regions. They are found in open habitats and at forest edges. Their nests may contain more than one cell.

== Species ==
=== Subgenus Acanthopompilus ===
- Arachnospila conjungens (Kohl, 1898)
- Arachnospila alpivaga (Kohl, 1888)
- Arachnospila nuda (Tournier, 1890)

=== Subgenus Ammosphex ===
- Arachnospila abnormis (Dahlbom, 1842)
- Arachnospila alvarabnormis (Wolf, 1965)
- Arachnospila anceps (Wesmael, 1851)
- Arachnospila apennines (Wolf, 1964)
- Arachnospila colpostoma (Kohl, 1886)
- Arachnospila consobrina (Dahlbom, 1843)
- Arachnospila dakota (Cresson 1867)
- Arachnospila gibbomima (Main, 1929)
- Arachnospila hedickei (Main, 1929)
- Arachnospila imbecillus (Banks 1939)
- Arachnospila luctuosa (Cresson 1865)
- Arachnospila michiganensis (Driesbach 1949)
- Arachnospila nivalabnormis (Wolf, 1965)
- Arachnospila occidentalis (Driesbach 1949)
- Arachnospila ofa (Tournier, 1890)
- Arachnospila opinata (Tournier, 1890)
- Arachnospila parvula (Banks, 1912)
- Arachnospila rhaetabnormis (Wolf, 1965)
- Arachnospila silvana (Kohl, 1886)
- Arachnospila solona (Banks, 1913)
- Arachnospila trivialis (Dahlbom, 1843)
- Arachnospila wasbaueri (Eavns, 1966)
- Arachnospila valesabnormis (Wolf, 1965)
- Arachnospila virgilabnormis Wolf, 1976
- Arachnospila wesmaeli (Thomson, 1870)
- Arachnospila westerlundi (Morawitz, 1893)

=== Subgenus Anoplochares ===
- Arachnospila asiatica (Morawitz, 1888)
- Arachnospila canariensis Wolf, 1978
- Arachnospila fuscomarginata (Thomson, 1870)
- Arachnospila minutula (Dahlbom, 1842)
- Arachnospila spissa (Schiodte, 1837)

=== Subgenus Arachnospila ===
- Arachnospila arcta (Cresson 1865)
- Arachnospila brevispinis Wahis, 1992
- Arachnospila fumipennis (Zetterstedt, 1838)
- Arachnospila ionica Wolf, 1964
- Arachnospila longifrons Wolf, 1990
- Arachnospila rufa (Haupt, 1927)
- Arachnospila sogdianoides (Wolf, 1964)

=== Subgenus Melanospila ===
- Arachnospila esau (Kohl, 1886)
- Arachnospila holomelas (Costa, 1882)
- Arachnospila tyrrhena Wahis, 1982
