= Anders Gustaf Dahlbom =

Swedish entomologist

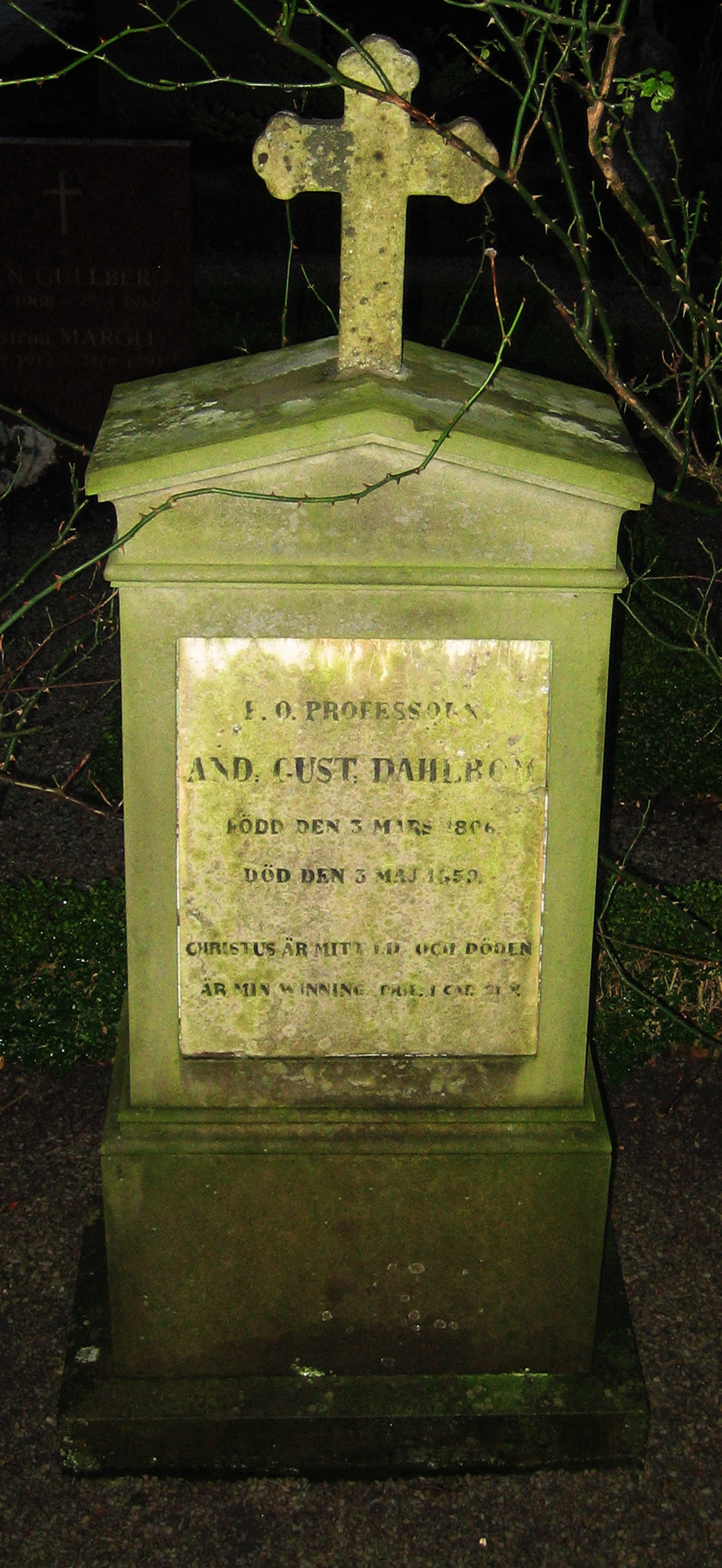
Grave of Anders Gustaf Dahlbom

Anders Gustaf Dahlbom (3 March 1806 – 3 May 1859) was a Swedish entomologist.

Dahlbom was born in Härberga parish in Östergötland County, son of a military surgeon. He matriculated at Lund University in 1825, completed his filosofie magister degree in 1829, became a docent of natural history in 1830, acting adjunct of entomology in 1841, adjunct in 1843 and keeper of the Entomological collections and professor extraordinary in 1857.

Supported by public funds, he made several research journeys, especially to northern Sweden and the mountain regions, where he first accompanied his teacher, the dipterologist Johan Wilhelm Zetterstedt, as well as to other parts of the country and abroad, and published his observations in various works, most important of which is Hymenoptera europaea praecipue borealia (1843–1853), a foundational work on the hymenoptera. He also published Kort underrättelse om skandinaviska insekters allmänna skada och nytta i hushållningen, the first Swedish handbook of practical entomology.
