= Priocnemis susterai =

Scientific classification
- Domain: Eukaryota
- Kingdom: Animalia
- Phylum: Arthropoda
- Class: Insecta
- Order: Hymenoptera
- Family: Pompilidae
- Genus: Priocnemis
- Species: P. susterai

Binomial name
- Priocnemis susterai Haupt, 1927

Synonyms
- Priocnemis clementi; Priocnemis gasconia

Species of wasp

Priocnemis susterai is a large species of pepsine spider wasp and is, with Priocnemis perturbator and Priocnemis coriacea, one of three similar species of the subgenus Umbripennis found in Great Britain. All three of these species are characterised by having plentiful erect hair on the face and propodum.

== Distribution ==
P. susterai is widespread in central and southern Europe but is difficult to distinguish from the more common P. perturbator. In Great Britain, it is widely distributed in southern and central England as far north as north-east Yorkshire and westwards to Wales and Cornwall.

== Habitat ==
This species can be found in open woodland with dry soils, and avoids waterlogged areas.

== Biology ==
In Great Britain the flight period is April to August, and the species overwinters as an adult. Due to confusion with P. perturbator, prey records of the two species (formerly considered a single species P. fuscus) are not reliable. However, it is probable that P. susterai preys on larger spiders of the families Lycosidae and Gnaphosidae. Although little is known about the nesting biology of P. susterai, like other Priocnemis wasps it probably excavates cells in pre-existing cavities. Like P. coriacea, the only flower it has been recorded nectaring at is wood spurge but it probably nectars at similar flowers with open corollas.
