= Euphorbia 'Efanthia' =

Hybrid plant

- Species: Euphorbia amygdaloides
- Hybrid parentage: Euphorbia amygdaloides * Euphorbia martinae
- Cultivar: 'Efanthia'

Euphorbia 'Efanthia' is a perennial plant, a hybrid of Euphorbia amygdaloides, and Euphorbia X martini.

It has dark green, or maroon, lance shaped leaves, which fade to a blue-green and it has flowers of bright yellow-green, which are on red stems. It can grow up to 50 cm tall, (12–36 in). It blooms in Spring.

This plant tolerates dry conditions, and has deep-coloured foliage in the fall months. It is best grown in well-drained soils in full sun. It is hardy to USDA zones 4–11.

It is an accepted name by the RHS.
