= Hay Wood, Whepstead =

Designated conservation area in Suffolk, England

Coordinates: 52.189°N 0.645°E

- Site of Special Scientific Interest
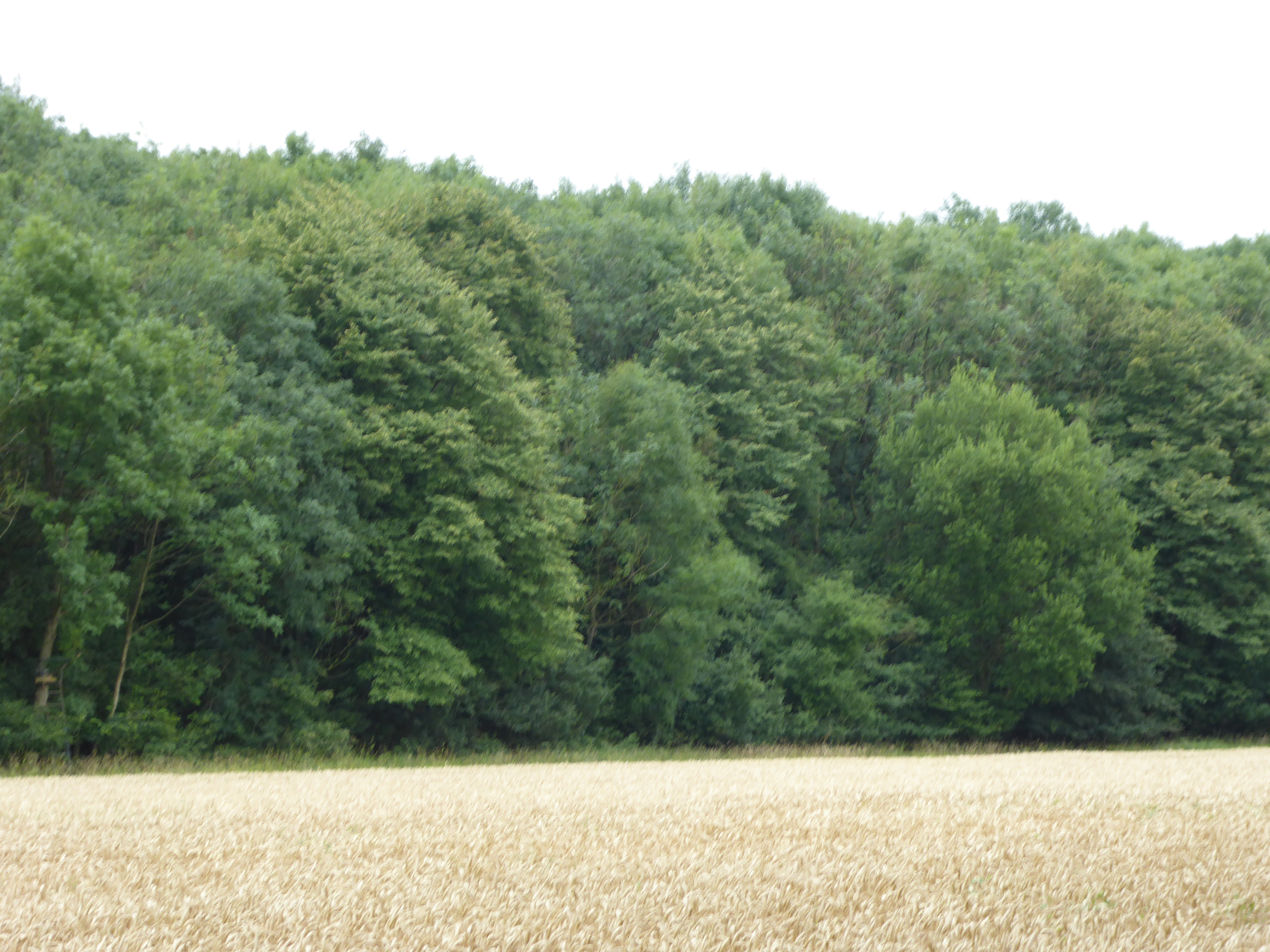
- Location of Hay Wood, Whepstead.
- Area of search: Suffolk
- Grid reference: TL 809 578
- Interest: Biological
- Area: 10.4 hectares
- Notification date: 1986
- Location map: Magic Map

Hay Wood, Whepstead is a 10.4-hectare (26-acre) biological Site of Special Scientific Interest west of Whepstead in Suffolk.

This ancient wood on poorly drained boulder clay has coppice trees of small-leaved lime and field maple with an understorey of hazel. Flora include wood spurge, herb Paris, ramsons and early purple orchid.

The site is private land, with no public access.
