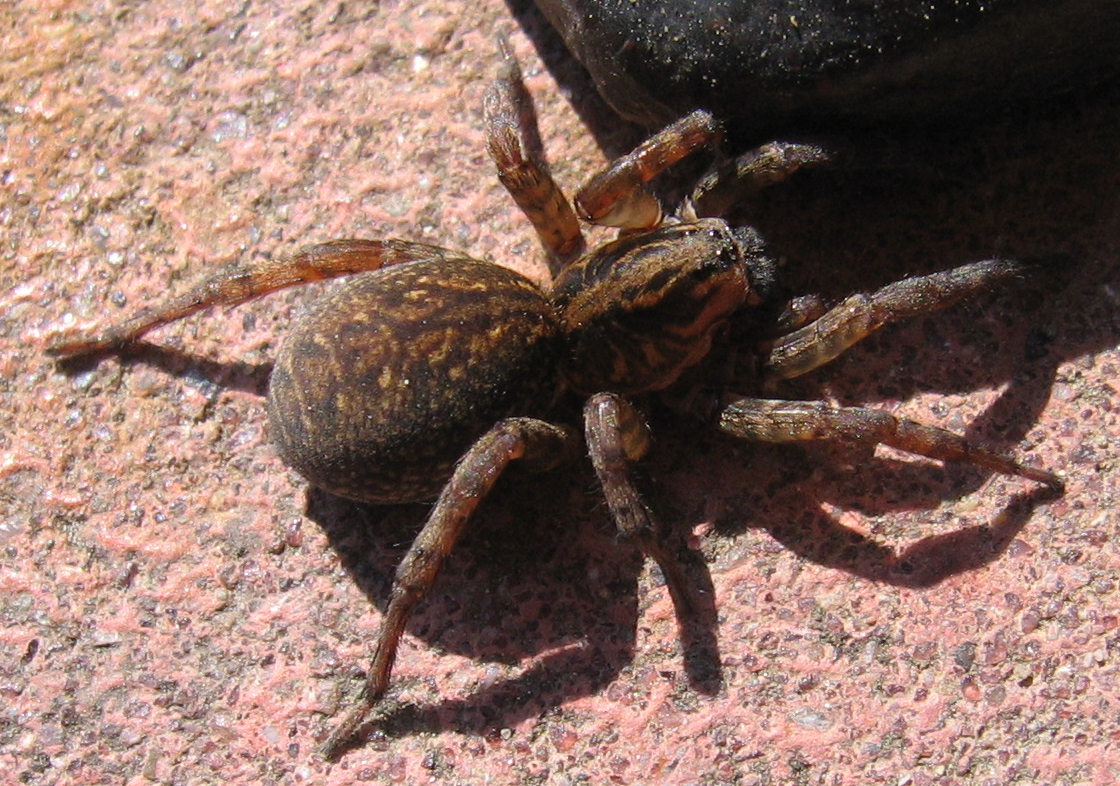

Scientific classification
- Kingdom: Animalia
- Phylum: Arthropoda
- Subphylum: Chelicerata
- Class: Arachnida
- Order: Araneae
- Infraorder: Araneomorphae
- Family: Lycosidae
- Genus: Trochosa
- Species: T. terricola

Binomial name
- Trochosa terricola (Thorell, 1856)

Synonyms
- Lycosa terricola (Westring, 1861); Lycosa agretyca (Blackwall, 1861); Trochosa trabalis (Ohlert, 1867); Lycosa lugubris (Menge, 1879); Lycosa pratensis (Emerton, 1885); Trochosa dybowskii (Kulczyński, 1885); Trochosina terricola (Simon, 1885); Lycosa orophila (Chamberlin & Gertsch, 1929); Allohogna pratensis (Roewer, 1955); Piratessa dybowskii (Roewer, 1955)

= Trochosa terricola =

Species of spider

Trochosa terricola is known as the ground wolf spider, is a wolf spider which is common and widespread in western and central Europe. It has been recorded as prey for the pompilid wasp.

== Description ==
Male Trochosa terricola are 7–9 mm in length while females are 7–14 mm. Similar in appearance to other Trochosa species, the female T. terricola has a reddish abdomen while the male has darkened front legs. The two short lines which are visible on carapace are a diagnostic feature of Trochosa wolf spiders. The dark cardiac mark separates it from Trochosa ruricola which has a light cardiac mark.

== Habitat ==
Trochosa terricola is found in woodland, grassland, heathland and industrial sites and is often encountered under stones and logs, but overall it shows a preference for drier, heath-like conditions, although has been found in pitfall traps in areas of bog and marsh. Unlike the related T. ruricola it can be common in upland areas.

== Biology ==
Adults, both males and females, have been recorded from March to November, with a peak from spring to mid-summer, although in warmer areas in can be active throughout the year. This spider generally appears more sluggish than the Pardosa wolf spiders with which it is sympatric. T. terricola is normally most active at night. It has been recorded as a prey item of the pompilid wasps Priocnemis perturbator and Anoplius viaticus

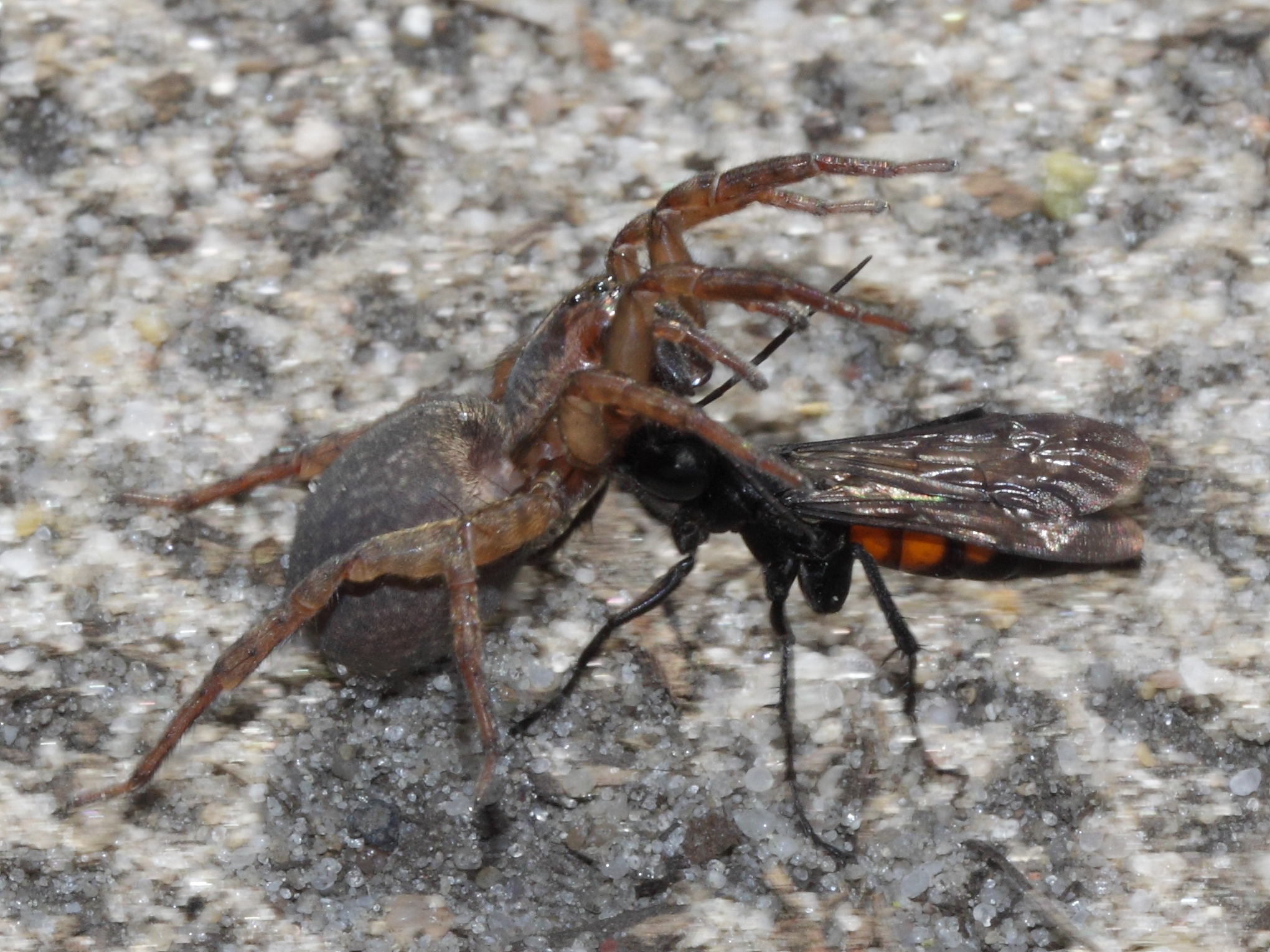
A spider wasp Anoplius viaticus with captured Trochosa terricola

== Distribution ==
Holarctic, in Europe it is found throughout the continent and Great Britain and Ireland but is absent from Iceland.
