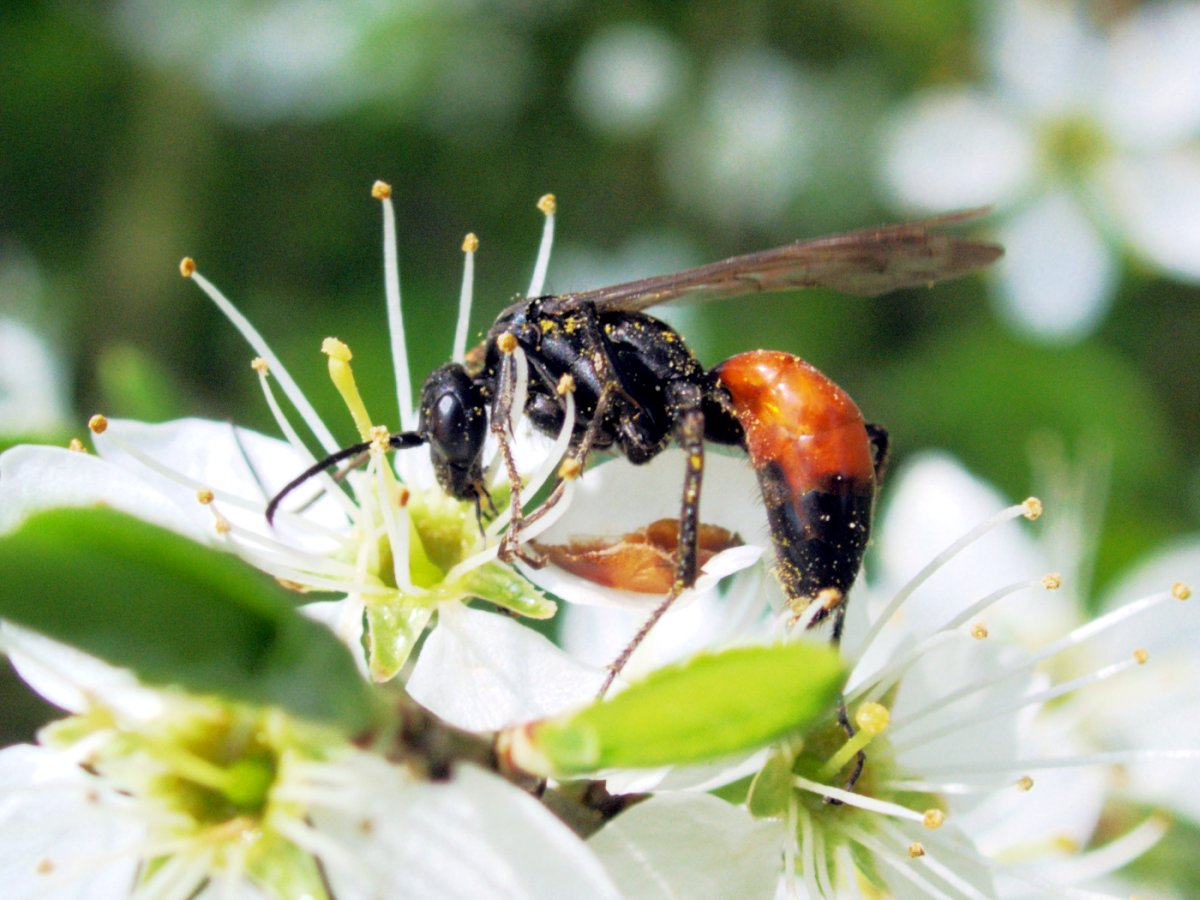

Scientific classification
- Kingdom: Animalia
- Phylum: Arthropoda
- Clade: Pancrustacea
- Class: Insecta
- Order: Hymenoptera
- Family: Pompilidae
- Genus: Priocnemis
- Species: P. perturbator

Binomial name
- Priocnemis perturbator (Harris, 1780)

Synonyms
- Sphex perturbator; Calicurgus ambulator; Ichneumon ambustor; Pompilus sepicola; Pompilus serripes; Priocnemis (Umbripennis) ater

= Priocnemis perturbator =

Species of wasp

Priocnemis perturbator is a relatively large species of spider wasp which is quite common in Europe. It was previously considered to be the same species as the closely related P. susterai which were lumped as P. fuscus and this means that some early observations of behaviour are not applicable to either species. Even now the two species need close observation under a microscope or hand lens to distinguish them from each other.

== Biology ==
Drawing by John Blackwall (1861)

Little is known about the nests of P. perturbator but other Priocnemis species generally use preexisting cavities in which they may excavate several cells. P. perturbator is univoltine and the flight period is from May to September. As stated in the introduction, many of the observations of P. perturbator collecting prey refer to the invalid taxon P. fuscus, but this species is thought to take larger spiders of the families Lycosidae and Gnaphosidae. Females have been seen on the ground, apparently searching for prey. The spider Trochosa terricola is a known prey item. This species is one of a handful of relatively large spider wasps, including Priocnemis susterai and Anoplius viaticus which overwinter as adults in Britain, emerging in the following spring. Priocnemis perturbator, which is reasonably common and has long antennae, can often be seen nectaring on wood spurge, dandelion, blackthorn, hawthorn and willow.

== Habitat ==
This species can be found in open woodland, but and various other habitats, so long as they are not waterlogged.

== Distribution ==
P. perturbator is widespread, from Great Britain and Ireland into central and northern Europe and Asia eastwards to Japan.
