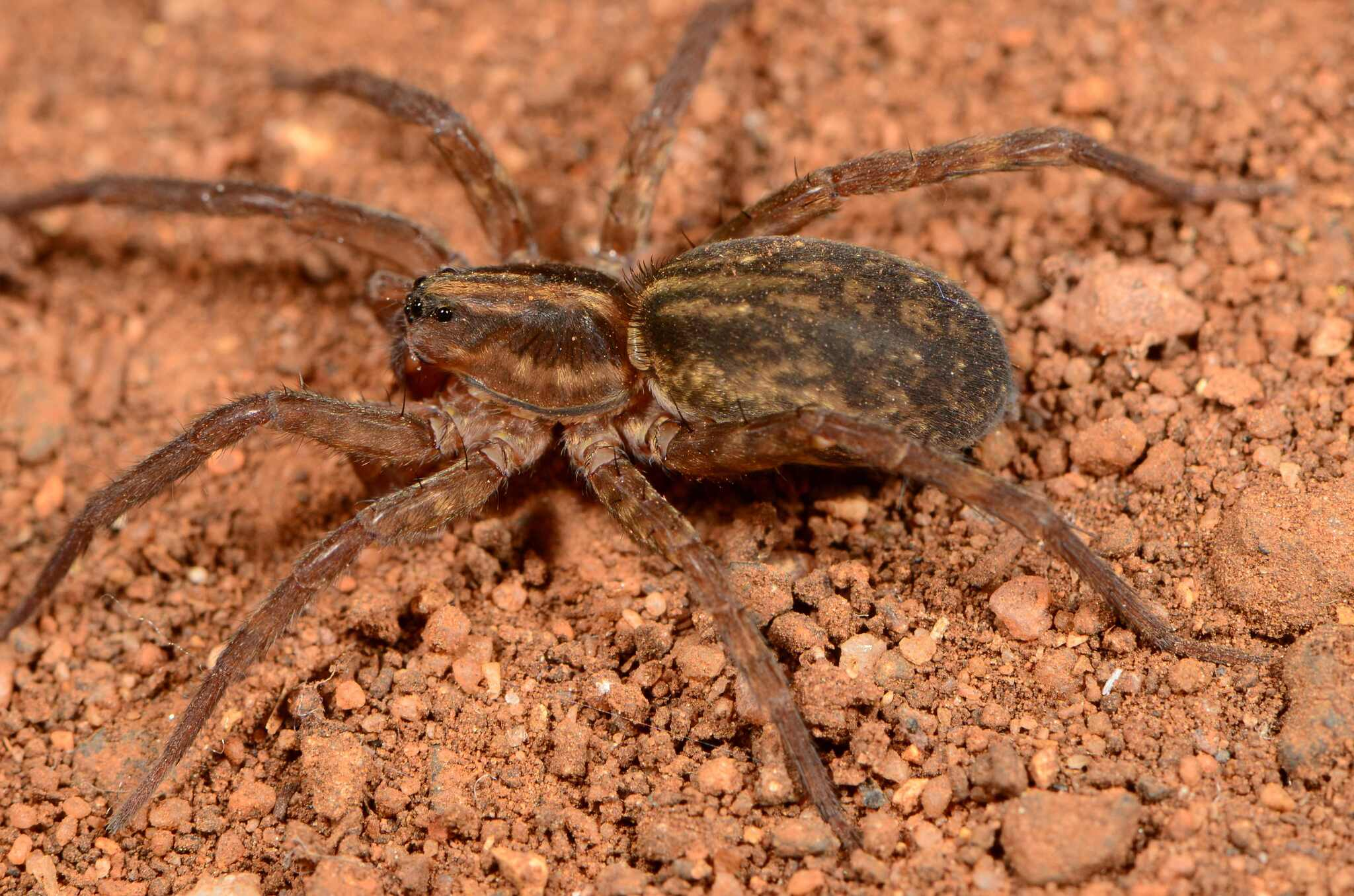
- juvenile female
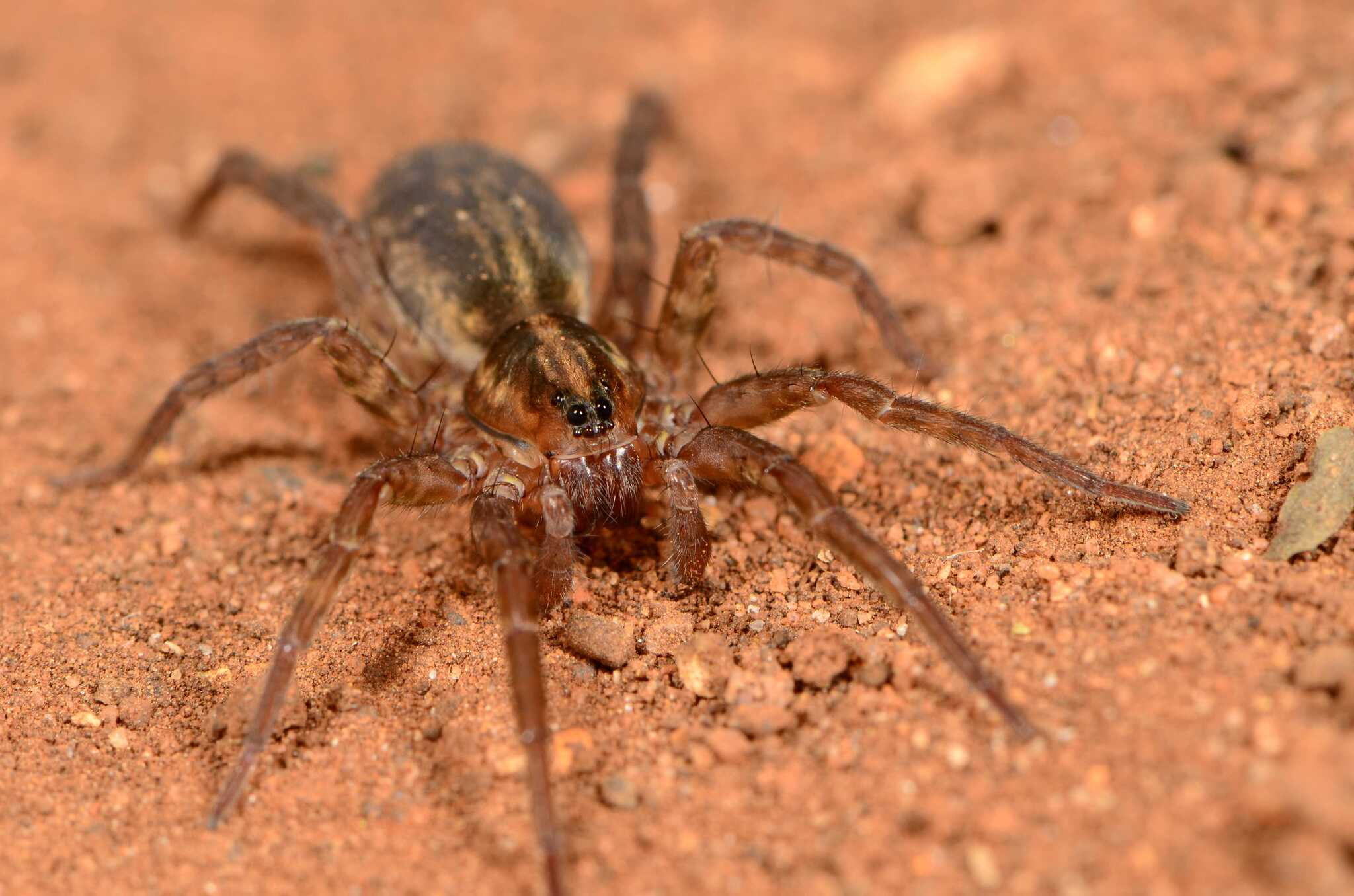
- juvenile female

Scientific classification
- Kingdom: Animalia
- Phylum: Arthropoda
- Subphylum: Chelicerata
- Class: Arachnida
- Order: Araneae
- Infraorder: Araneomorphae
- Family: Lycosidae
- Genus: Allocosa
- Species: A. tuberculipalpa

Binomial name
- Allocosa tuberculipalpa (Caporiacco, 1940)

Synonyms
- Trochosa tuberculipalpus Caporiacco, 1940; Allocosa tuberculipalpus Roewer, 1955

= Allocosa tuberculipalpa =

Palp Apophysis Allocosa Wolf Spider

Species of spider

Allocosa tuberculipalpa is a species of spider in the family Lycosidae. It is commonly known as the palp apophysis Allocosa wolf spider.

== Distribution ==
Allocosa tuberculipalpa is known from Ethiopia, Kenya, and South Africa.

In South Africa, the species is known from the provinces Eastern Cape, Free State, Gauteng, Limpopo, and Mpumalanga.

== Habitat and ecology ==
The species is a free running ground dweller sampled from Grassland, Savanna, and Thicket biomes at altitudes ranging from 175 to 1752 m. The species has also been sampled from citrus and grapefruit orchards.

== Description ==
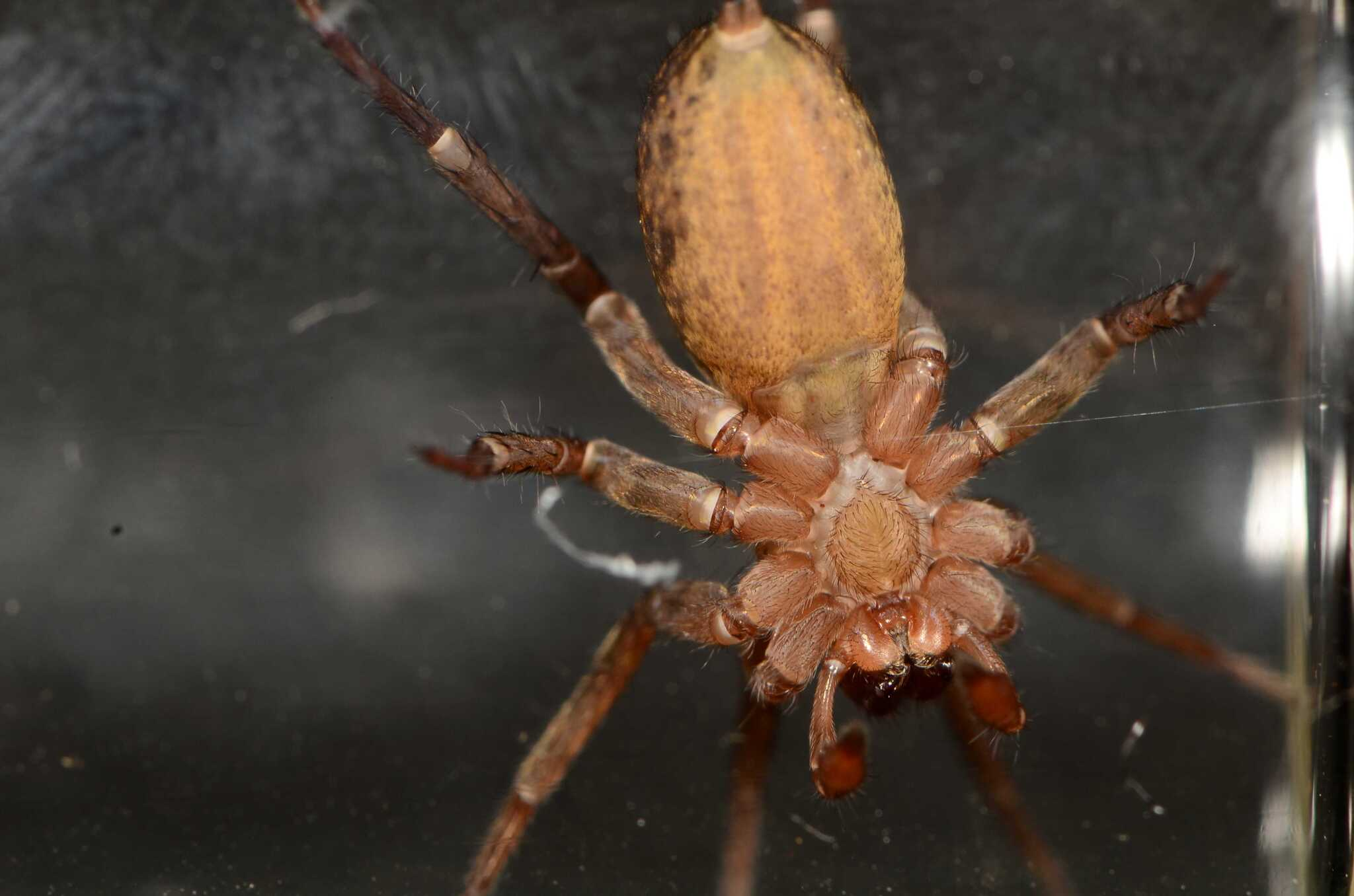
ventral view of juvenile female

== Conservation ==
Allocosa tuberculipalpa is listed as Least Concern by the South African National Biodiversity Institute due to its wide geographical range. The species is protected in seven protected areas.

== Taxonomy ==
The species was originally described in 1940 as Trochosa tuberculipalpus from Ethiopia. The species was revised by Roewer in 1959 and is known from both sexes.
