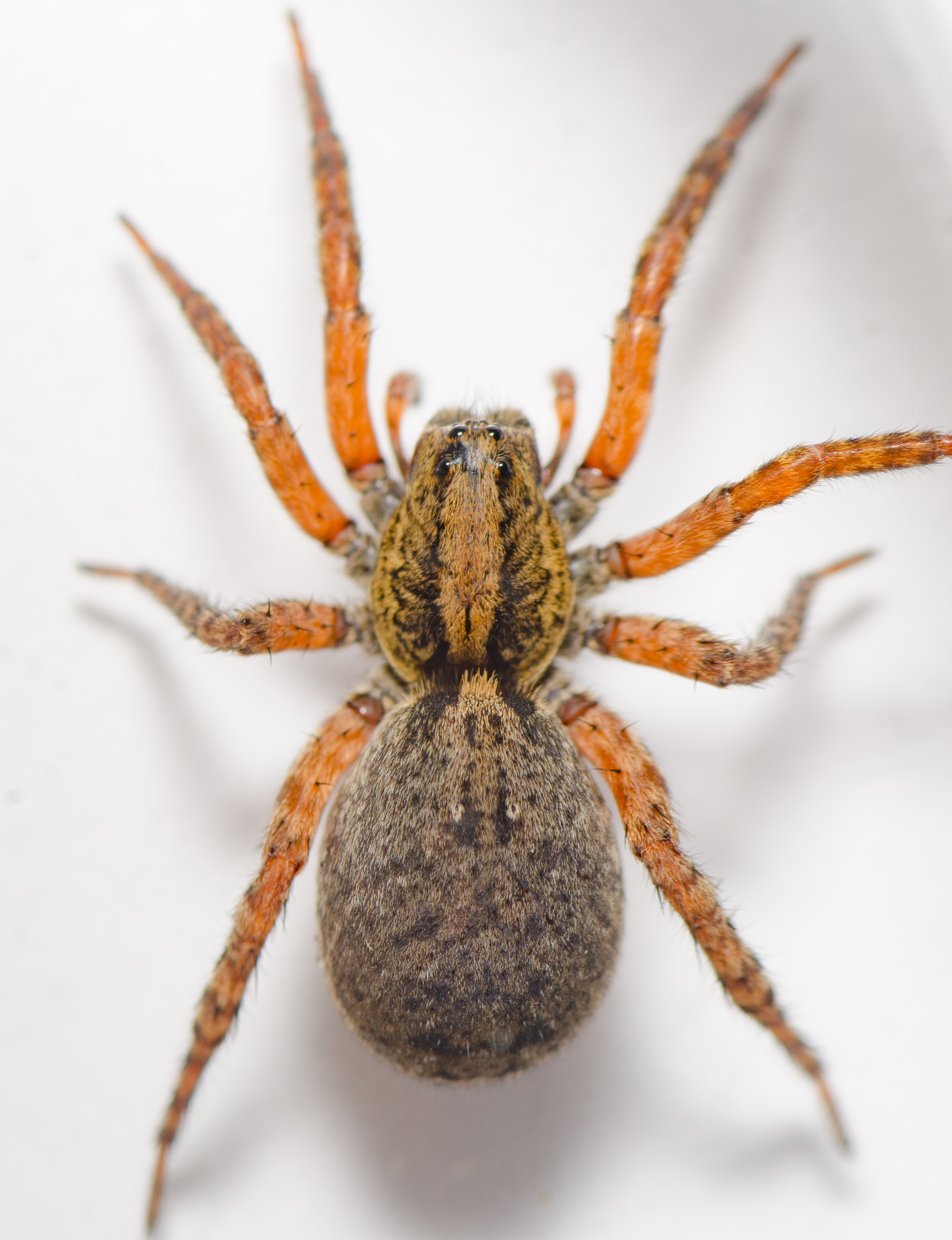
- Trochosa sepulchralis female

Scientific classification
- Kingdom: Animalia
- Phylum: Arthropoda
- Subphylum: Chelicerata
- Class: Arachnida
- Order: Araneae
- Infraorder: Araneomorphae
- Family: Lycosidae
- Genus: Trochosa
- Species: T. sepulchralis

Binomial name
- Trochosa sepulchralis (Montgomery, 1902)

= Trochosa sepulchralis =

Species of spider

Trochosa sepulchralis is a species of wolf spider in the family Lycosidae. It is found in the United States.
