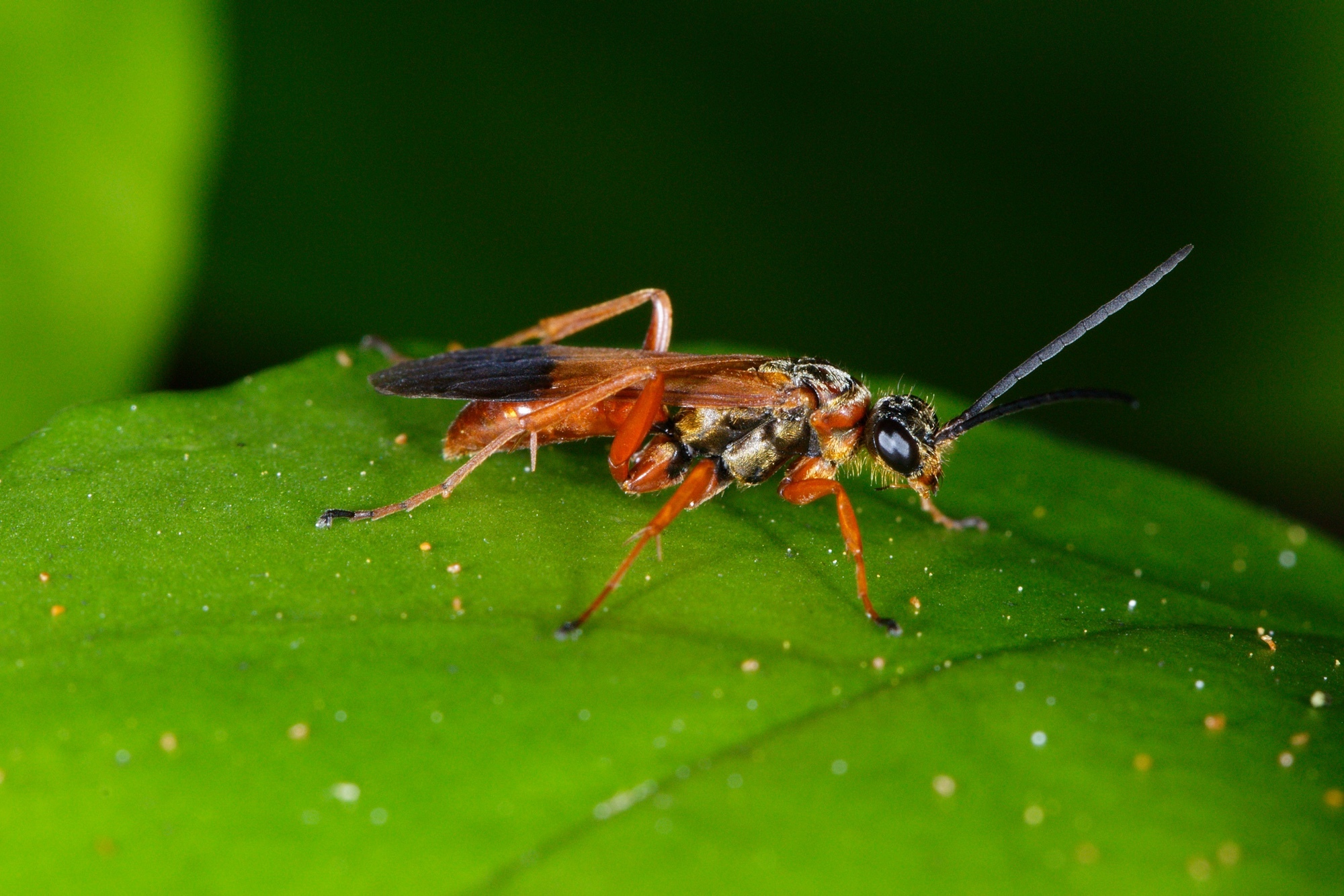
- Adult perched on a leaf, showing the red colouration typical of North Island populations.

Scientific classification
- Kingdom: Animalia
- Phylum: Arthropoda
- Clade: Pancrustacea
- Class: Insecta
- Order: Hymenoptera
- Family: Pompilidae
- Genus: Priocnemis
- Species: P. conformis

Binomial name
- Priocnemis conformis (Smith, Transactions of the Entomological Society of London part III,1876)
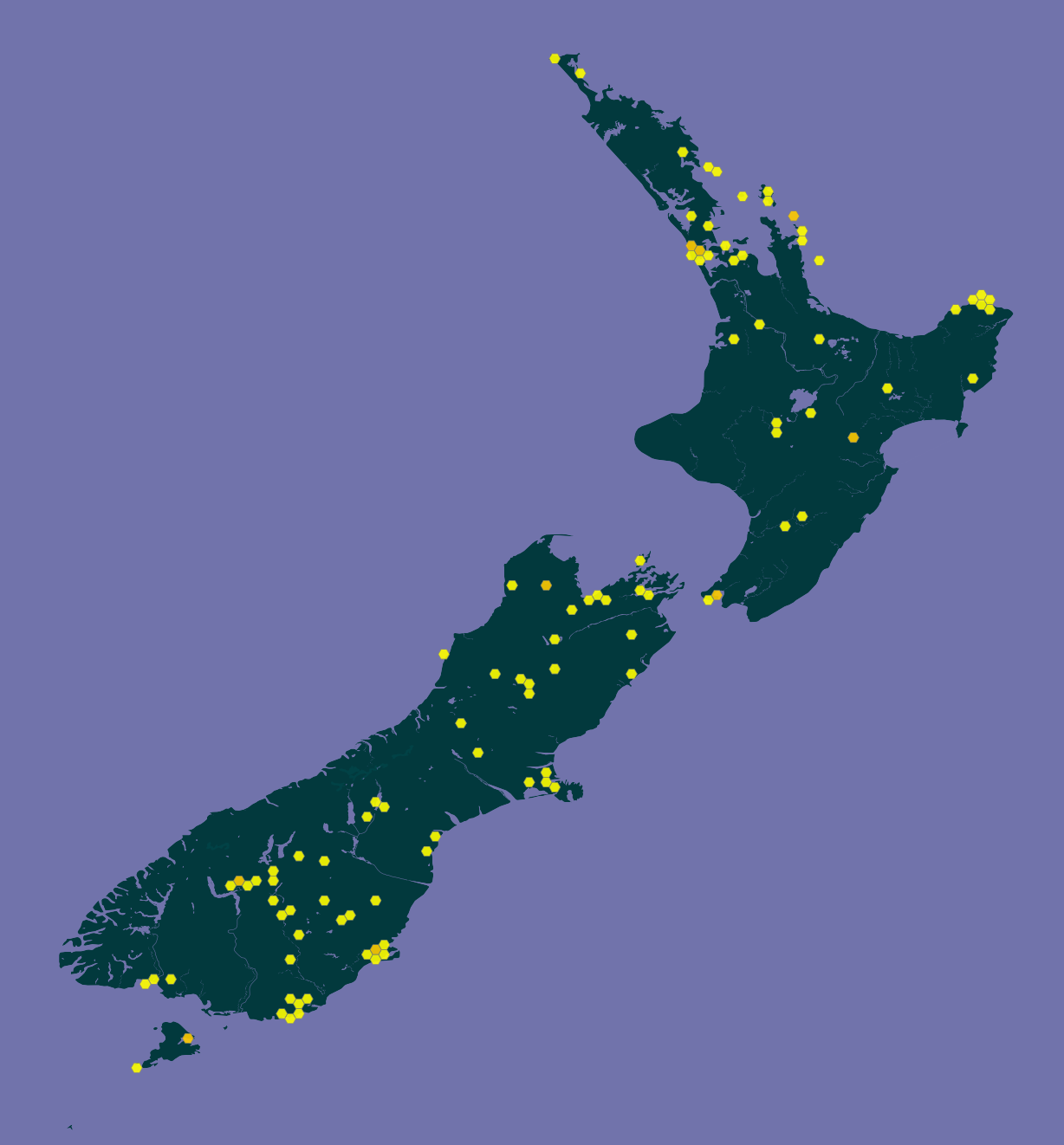
- Distribution of Priocnemis conformis produced from GBIF observations

Synonyms
- Trichocurgus conformis Smith, 1876; Priocnemis diligens Smith, 1876; Priocnemis marginatus Smith, 1876

= Priocnemis conformis =

Species of pepsine spider wasp

Priocnemis conformis is a medium-sized species of pepsine spider wasp found in New Zealand. It has a widespread distribution, occurring within the North Island, South Island, and Stewart Island.

== Description ==
North Island populations of both female and male P. conformis have red bodies, while South Island populations have increasing melanism associated with higher latitudes. In the northern South Island, the thorax and head are black, with the metasoma red; in latitudes south of 44°S. the whole body is black. Wings are typically subhyaline with a reddish tint and black tips, although populations found on Stewart Island may also have blackened appendages and wings. Pedipalps and antennae also shorten and thicken with increasing latitude.

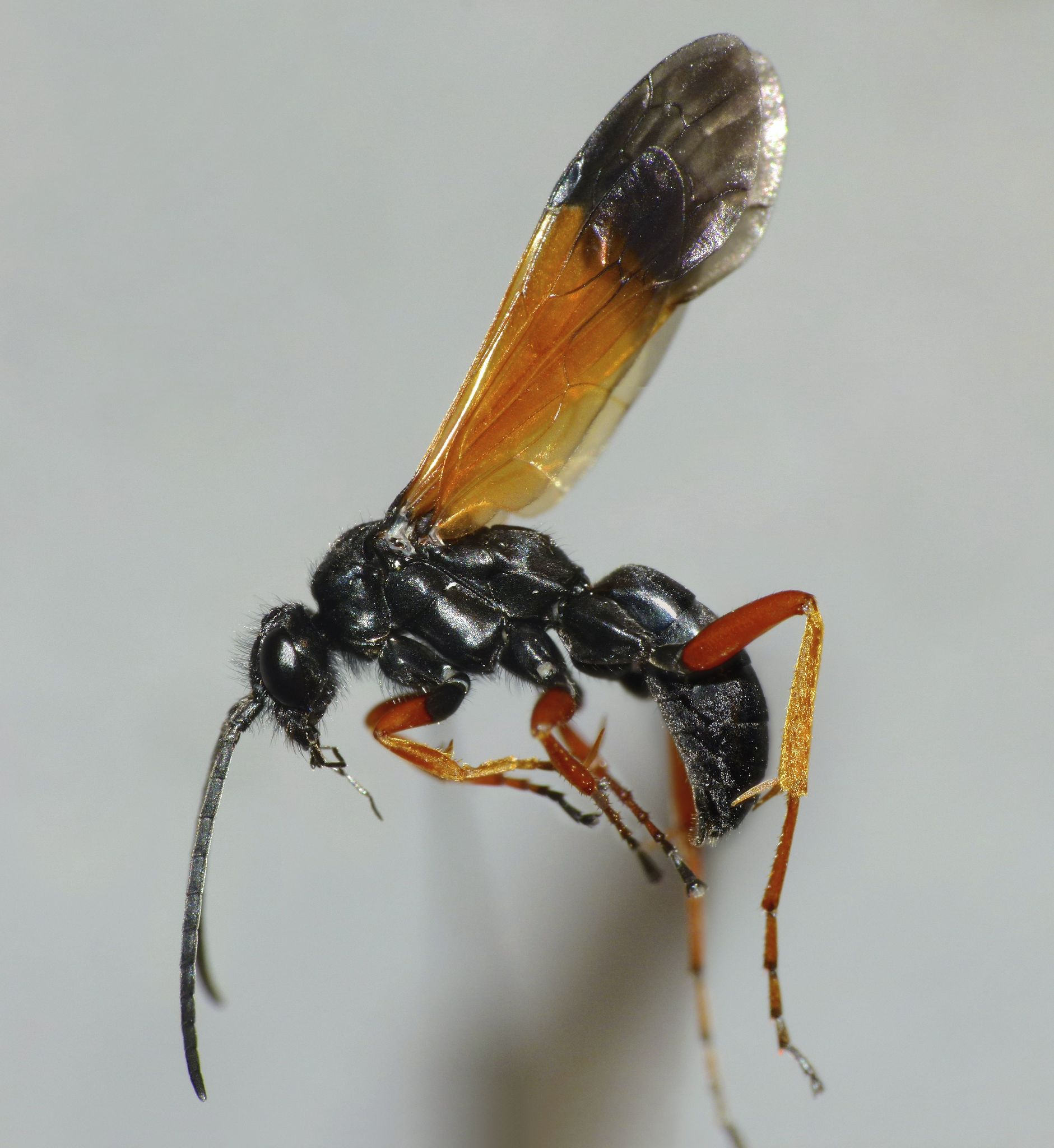
Priocnemis conformis adult from the South Island showing black colouration on the body.

== Behaviour ==
Priocnemis conformis females predominantly prey on the early instars of mygalomorph spiders, including Stanwellia species, Cantuaria spp., and the black tunnelweb Porrhothele antipodiana. Prior to digging their nests, females sting and paralyse the spider for up to fourteen hours, often hiding the spider under twigs, logs, and leaves while digging their nest. Nests are largely made of solitary cells within burrows, typically within loose soil although they may also use sand in coastal areas or utilise pre-existing burrows. Spiders are placed within the nest, and a single egg is laid across the mid-dorsum of the paralysed spider, with positioning unique for Priocnemis in New Zealand.

Nests of P. conformis females are typically closed and covered with leaves, twigs, berries, and soil (or sand in coastal areas). The female may also make between three and nine additional burrows to act as a false nest, often arranged in an arc formation. As a result of temporary paralysis, recovered spiders may spin a thick web matting on the cell floor. Young feed until days 15–25, after which they spin a cocoon, and emerge days 17–27. Males often emerge 4–10 days prior to females.

The robber fly Saropogon extenuatus acts as a mimic of female P. conformis, predating on males it attacks.
