= Trochosa nigerrima =

Scientific classification
- Kingdom: Animalia
- Phylum: Arthropoda
- Subphylum: Chelicerata
- Class: Arachnida
- Order: Araneae
- Infraorder: Araneomorphae
- Family: Lycosidae
- Genus: Trochosa
- Species: T. nigerrima

Binomial name
- Trochosa nigerrima Roewer, 1960

Species of spider

Trochosa nigerrima is a species of spider in the family Lycosidae. It is endemic to South Africa.

== Distribution ==
Trochosa nigerrima is found in South Africa.

In South Africa, it is known only from the type locality of Lydenburg in Mpumalanga at 1382 m altitude.

== Habitat and ecology ==
Trochosa nigerrima is a free-running ground dweller sampled from the Grassland biome.

== Conservation ==
Trochosa nigerrima is listed as Data Deficient for Taxonomic reasons by the South African National Biodiversity Institute. The status of the species remains obscure. More sampling is needed to collect the male and to determine the species' range.

== Taxonomy ==
Trochosa nigerrima was described by Roewer in 1960 as Trochosippa nigerrima from Lydenburg. The species has not been revised and is known only from the female.
