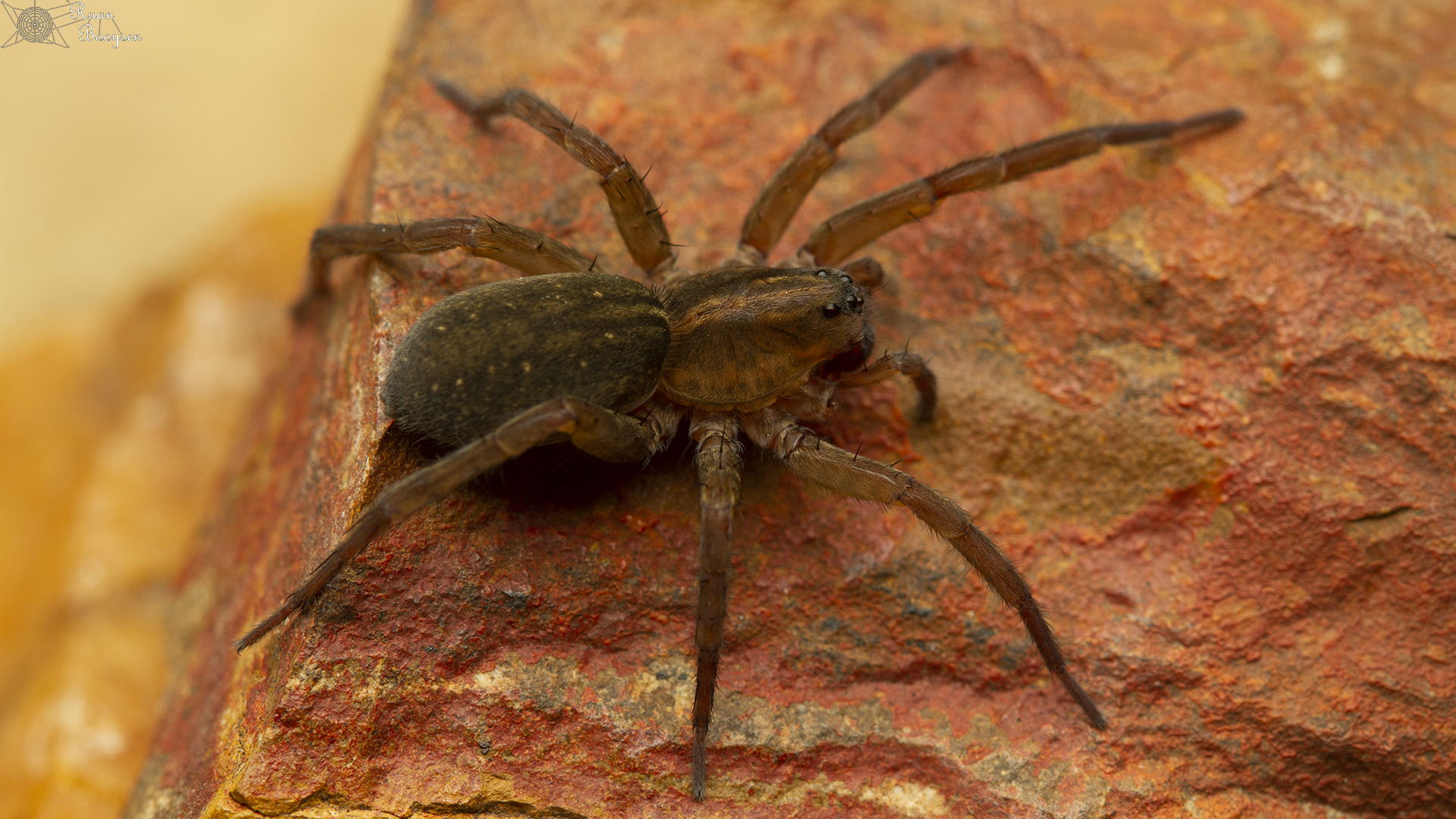
- female
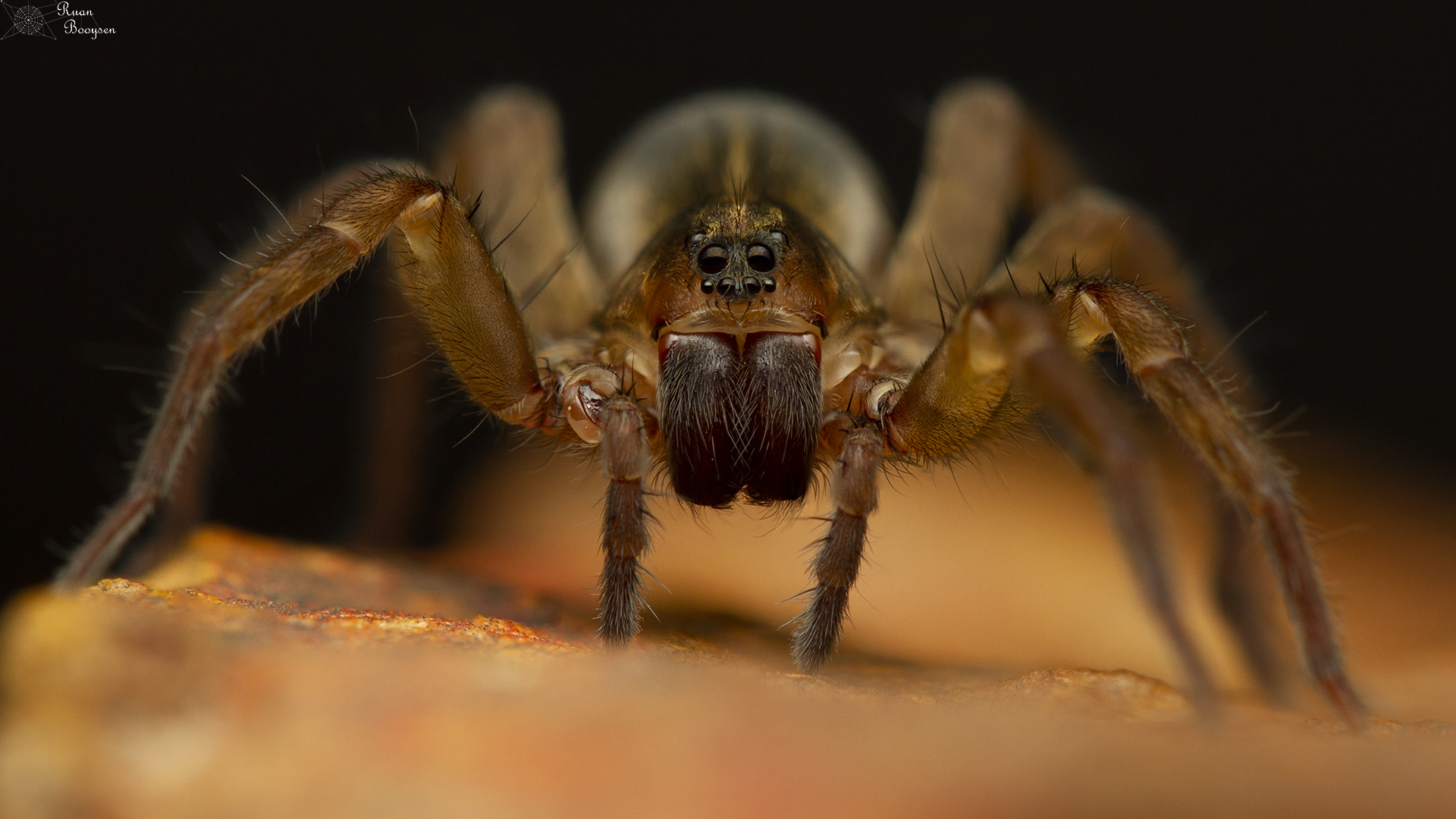
- female

Scientific classification
- Kingdom: Animalia
- Phylum: Arthropoda
- Subphylum: Chelicerata
- Class: Arachnida
- Order: Araneae
- Infraorder: Araneomorphae
- Family: Lycosidae
- Genus: Trochosa
- Species: T. albipilosa

Binomial name
- Trochosa albipilosa (Roewer, 1960)

Synonyms
- Trochosina albipilosa Roewer, 1960

= Trochosa albipilosa =

Port Elizabeth Trochosa wolf spider

Species of spider

Trochosa albipilosa is a species of spider in the family Lycosidae. It is endemic to South Africa and is commonly known as the Port Elizabeth Trochosa wolf spider.

== Distribution ==
Trochosa albipilosa is found in South Africa.

In South Africa, it is known only from the type locality of Port Elizabeth in the Eastern Cape at 7 m altitude.

== Habitat and ecology ==
Trochosa albipilosa is a free-running ground dweller sampled from the Fynbos biome.

== Conservation ==
Trochosa albipilosa is listed as Data Deficient for Taxonomic reasons by the South African National Biodiversity Institute. The status of the species remains obscure. More sampling is needed to collect the male and to determine the species' range.

== Taxonomy ==
Trochosa albipilosa was described by Roewer in 1960 as Trochosina albipilosa from Port Elizabeth. The species has not been revised and is known only from the female.
