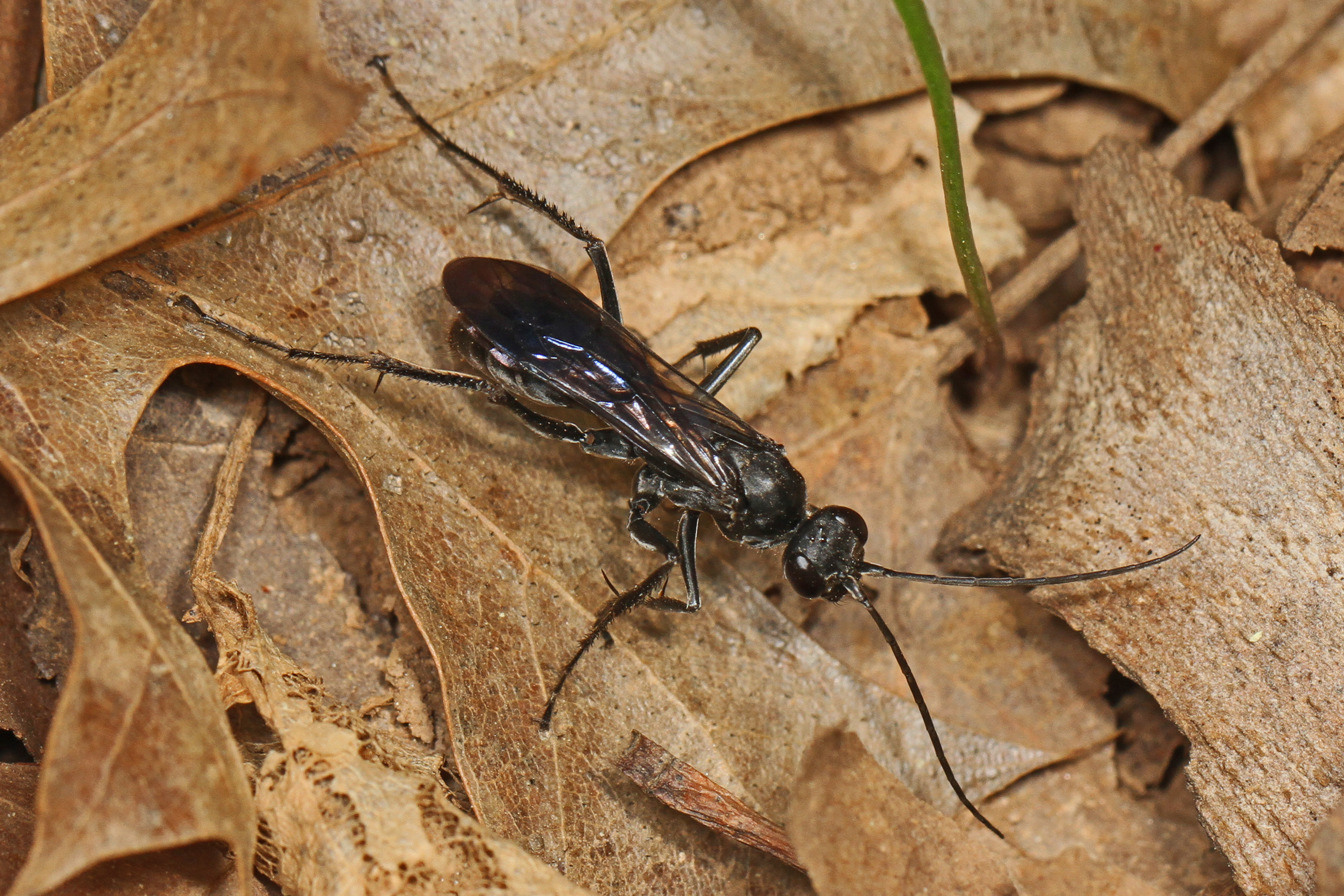

Scientific classification
- Domain: Eukaryota
- Kingdom: Animalia
- Phylum: Arthropoda
- Class: Insecta
- Order: Hymenoptera
- Family: Pompilidae
- Genus: Priocnemis
- Species: P. minorata

Binomial name
- Priocnemis minorata Banks, 1912

= Priocnemis minorata =

Species of wasp

Priocnemis minorata is a species of spider wasp in the family Pompilidae.
