= Trochosa modesta =

Lydenburg Trochosa wolf spider

Scientific classification
- Kingdom: Animalia
- Phylum: Arthropoda
- Subphylum: Chelicerata
- Class: Arachnida
- Order: Araneae
- Infraorder: Araneomorphae
- Family: Lycosidae
- Genus: Trochosa
- Species: T. modesta

Binomial name
- Trochosa modesta (Roewer, 1960)

Species of spider

Trochosa modesta is a species of spider in the family Lycosidae. It is endemic to South Africa and is commonly known as the Lydenburg Trochosa wolf spider.

== Distribution ==
Trochosa modesta is found in South Africa.

In South Africa, it is known only from the type locality of Lydenburg in Mpumalanga at 1382 m altitude.

== Habitat and ecology ==
Trochosa modesta is a free-running ground dweller sampled from the Grassland biome.

== Conservation ==
Trochosa modesta is listed as Data Deficient for Taxonomic reasons by the South African National Biodiversity Institute. The status of the species remains obscure. More sampling is needed to collect the male and to determine the species' range.

== Taxonomy ==
Trochosa modesta was described by Roewer in 1960 as Trochosippa modesta from Lydenburg. The species has not been revised and is known only from the female.
