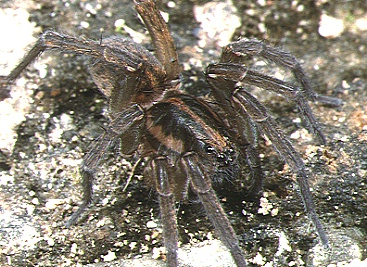
- Female

Scientific classification
- Kingdom: Animalia
- Phylum: Arthropoda
- Subphylum: Chelicerata
- Class: Arachnida
- Order: Araneae
- Infraorder: Araneomorphae
- Family: Lycosidae
- Genus: Trochosa
- Species: T. aquatica

Binomial name
- Trochosa aquatica (Tanaka, 1985)

= Trochosa aquatica =

Species of spider

Trochosa aquatica is a species of wolf spider found in eastern Asia which was first described in 1985.

== Description ==
The males measure 5.8-7.65mm in length, females 5.6-9.0mm. The female has a dark brown carapace with paler more yellow median and lateral stripes. The abdomen is dark grey with yellowish stripes and the legs are reddish brown. The normally smaller male is similar to female but has yellowish brown legs.

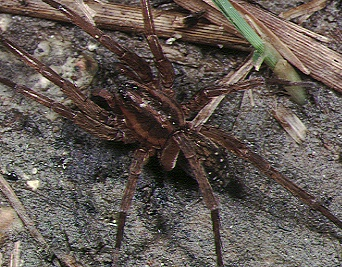
male Trochosa aquatica

== Habitat ==
Trochosa aquatica is found among in leaf litter or in small depressions near paddy fields. The adult spiders are found from May to August.

== Distribution ==
Japan (Honshu and Kyushu), Korea and China.

== Taxonomy ==
Closely related to Trochosa wuchangensis of China.
