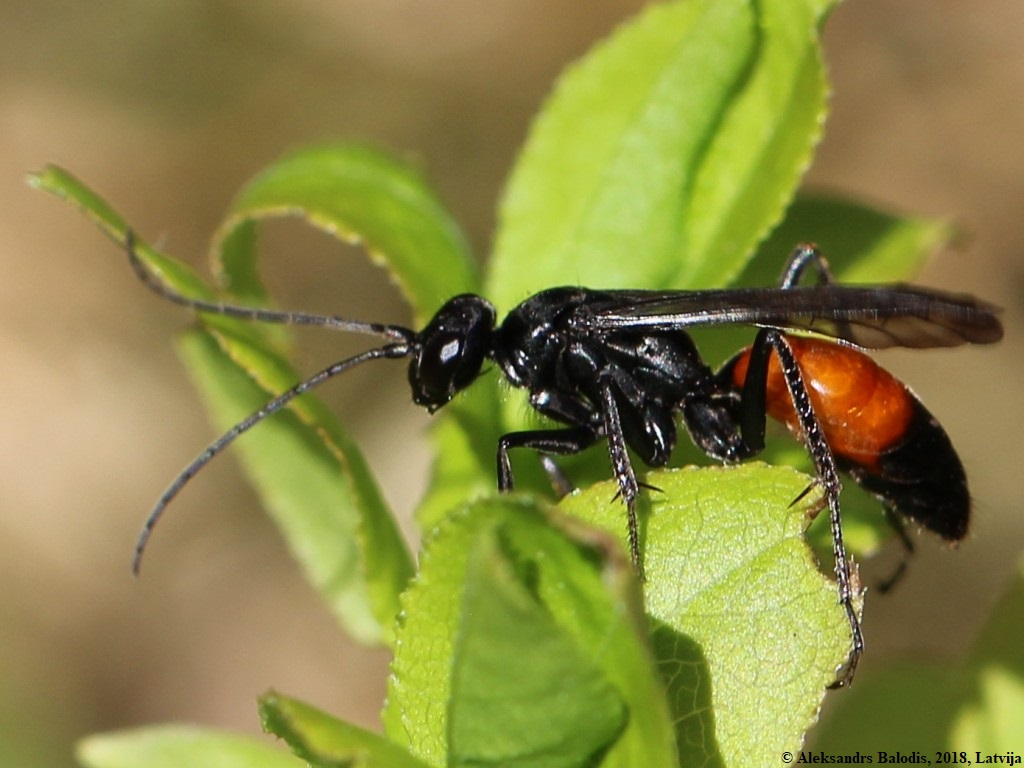

Scientific classification
- Domain: Eukaryota
- Kingdom: Animalia
- Phylum: Arthropoda
- Class: Insecta
- Order: Hymenoptera
- Family: Pompilidae
- Genus: Priocnemis
- Species: P. coriacea

Binomial name
- Priocnemis coriacea Dahlbom, 1843

Synonyms
- Priocnemis medoca

= Priocnemis coriacea =

Species of wasp

Priocnemis coriacea is a large species of pepsine spider wasp characterised by having plentiful erect hair on the face and propodeum. It is a member of the subgenus Umbripennis.

== Distribution ==
P. coriacea is an uncommon species which is scarce in central Europe, rare in northern and southern Europe. In Great Britain it is widely distributed through southern and central England.

== Habitat ==
P. coriacea shows a preference for light soils in open habitats such as downland and thinly wooded heathland.

== Biology ==
In Great Britain the flight period is April to August, although it has been stated that June may be the latest date.

No prey items have been recorded, but it is likely that P. coriacea takes larger species of the families Lycosidae and Gnaphosidae. Its nesting biology is largely unknown but members of Priocnemis generally use pre-existing cavities and then excavate a number of cells within them. The only flower which P. coriacea has been recorded feeding on is wood spurge, but it may visit a wide range of flowers, so long as they have short corollas.
