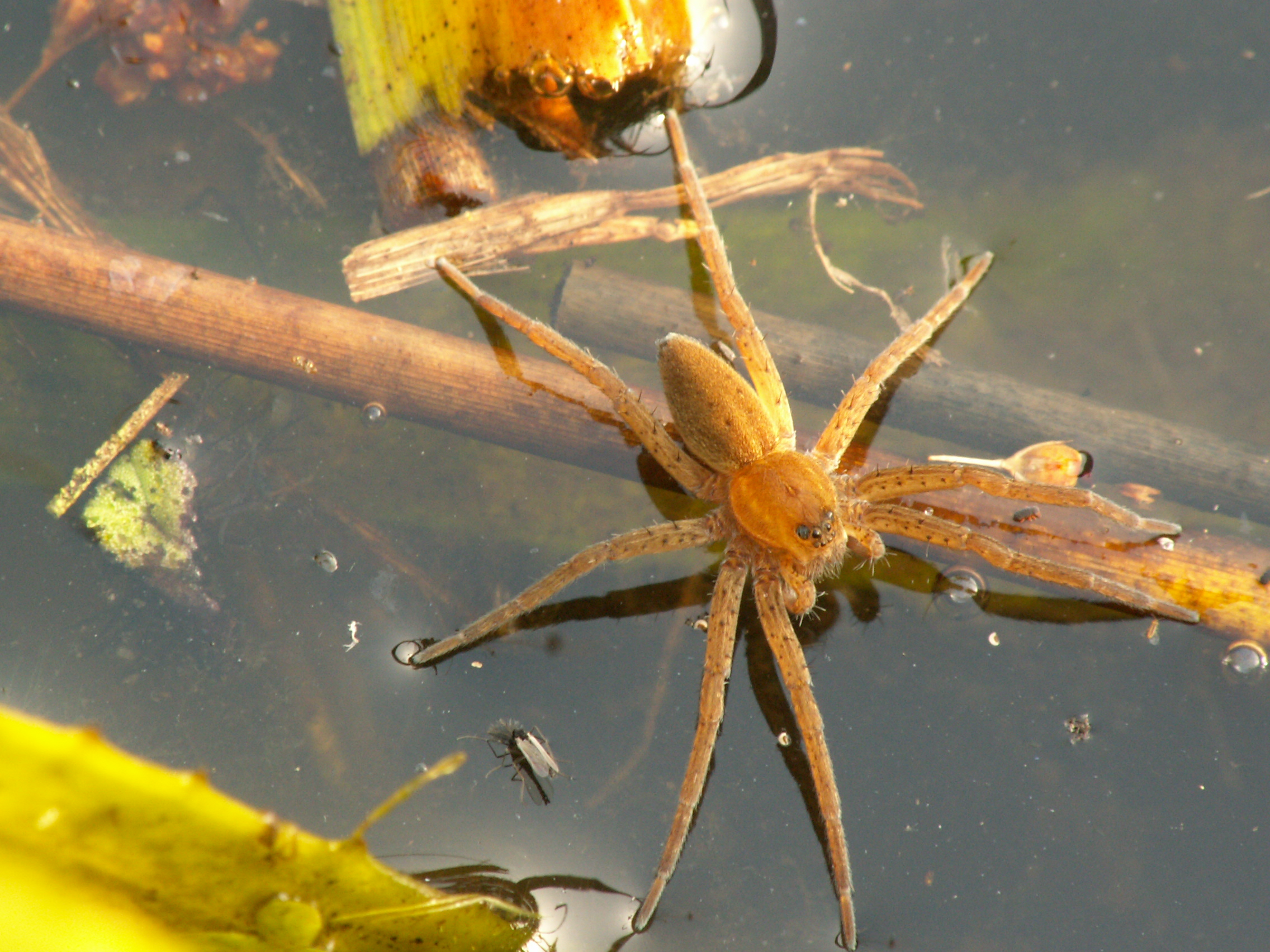

Scientific classification
- Kingdom: Animalia
- Phylum: Arthropoda
- Subphylum: Chelicerata
- Class: Arachnida
- Order: Araneae
- Infraorder: Araneomorphae
- Family: Lycosidae
- Genus: Trochosa
- Species: T. spinipalpis

Binomial name
- Trochosa spinipalpis (F. O. Pickard-Cambridge), 1895)

Synonyms
- Lycosa spinipalpis F. O. Pickard-Cambridge, 1859; Trochosa daxinensis Hu, 1984

= Trochosa spinipalpis =

Species of spider

Trochosa spinipalpis is a specialised species of Palearctic, wolf spider which is restricted to bogs and other wetlands.

== Description ==
The male is 6–8 mm long while females measure 9–12 mm in length. The prosoma has an obvious, yellowish median band with dark lateral bands. Two longish, dark oval stripes in anterior half of the bright median band. The opisthosoma is dark reddish brown with dark with an indistinct cardiac mark.

== Habitat and ecology ==
Trochosa spinipalpis has a preference for damp places, especially Sphagnum bogs, wet heathland, damp meadows, fens or marshes.

== Distribution ==
Palearctic but more northerly in regions where suitable wetlands exist, e.g. in Europe north of the Mediterranean zone. In Great Britain it has a very scattered distribution and is widespread but localised.

== Conservation ==
In Great Britain T. spinipalpis has declined and this is probably attributable to drainage of wetlands. Protection of wetlands from drainage and conversion to other land uses by ensuring adequate water supplies is essential to this spider's conservation.

== Bite ==
Trochosa spinipalpis is capable of biting humans, usually when handled and accidentally squeezed. The bite is as painful as a wasp sting and may cause a moderate local epidermal swelling.
