= Trochosa hungarica =

Scientific classification
- Kingdom: Animalia
- Phylum: Arthropoda
- Subphylum: Chelicerata
- Class: Arachnida
- Order: Araneae
- Infraorder: Araneomorphae
- Family: Lycosidae
- Genus: Trochosa
- Species: T. hungarica

Binomial name
- Trochosa hungarica Herman, 1879

Species of spider

Trochosa hungarica is a wolf spider species in the genus Trochosa found in Hungary.
