= Trochosa abdita =

Scientific classification
- Kingdom: Animalia
- Phylum: Arthropoda
- Subphylum: Chelicerata
- Class: Arachnida
- Order: Araneae
- Infraorder: Araneomorphae
- Family: Lycosidae
- Genus: Trochosa
- Species: T. abdita

Binomial name
- Trochosa abdita (Gertsch, 1934)

Species of spider

Trochosa abdita is a spider in the family Lycosidae ("wolf spiders"), in the infraorder Araneomorphae ("true spiders"). It is found in the USA.
