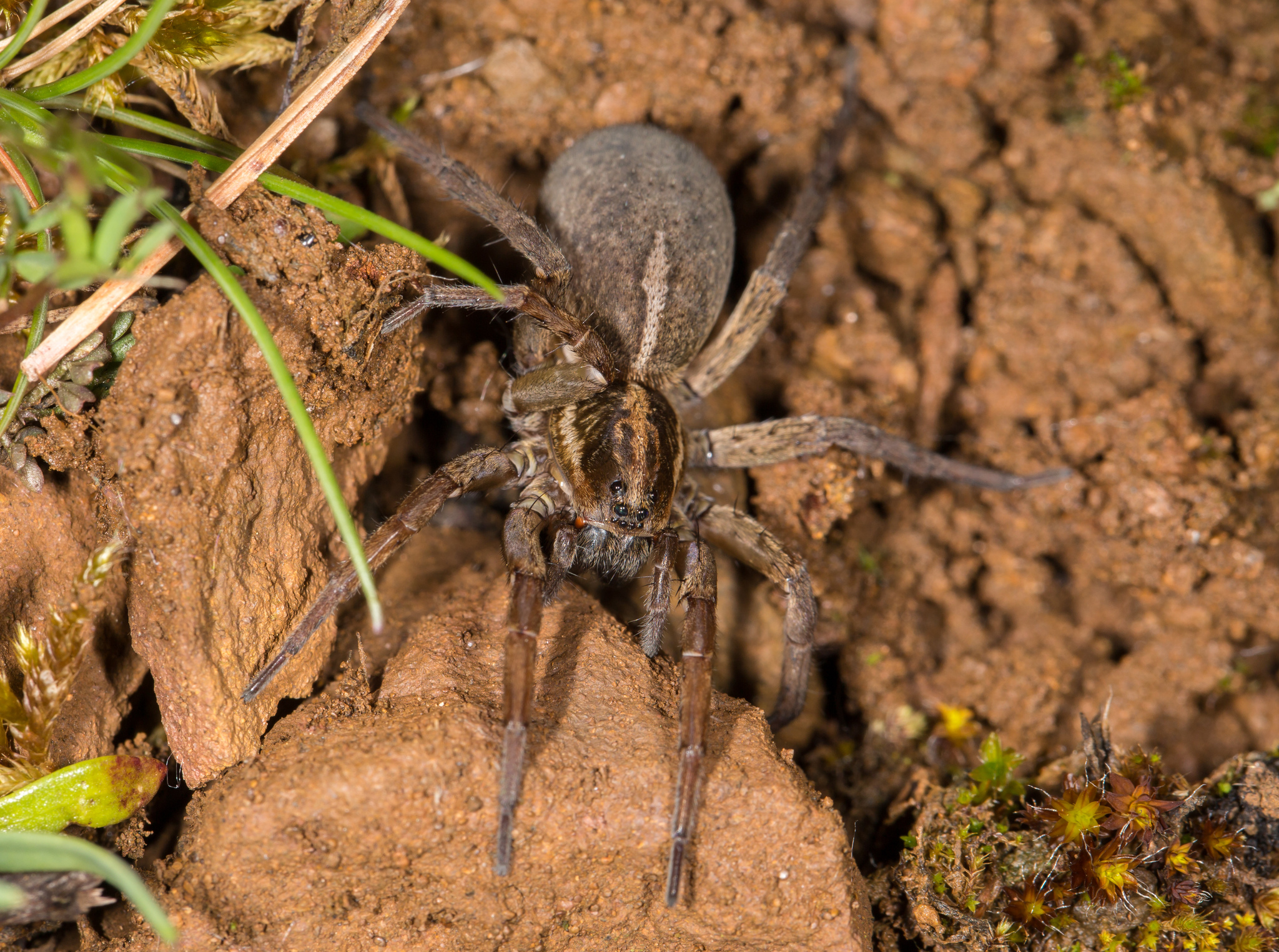

Scientific classification
- Kingdom: Animalia
- Phylum: Arthropoda
- Subphylum: Chelicerata
- Class: Arachnida
- Order: Araneae
- Infraorder: Araneomorphae
- Family: Lycosidae
- Genus: Trochosa
- Species: T. robusta

Binomial name
- Trochosa robusta (Simon, 1876)

Synonyms
- Lycosa robusta Simon, 1876

= Trochosa robusta =

Species of spider

Trochosa robusta is a wolf spider species with a Palearctic distribution, ranging from western Europe to Japan. In Europe, it is common north to Germany and Poland, and it also occurs in the Baltic countries and in England. The spiderlings can spread by ballooning and it has only recently established itself in Denmark where first observed in 2015 and restricted to south-facing slopes on the island of Bornholm. This heat-loving species is not known from elsewhere in the Nordic countries, but it is expected that it may spread further with increasing temperatures.
