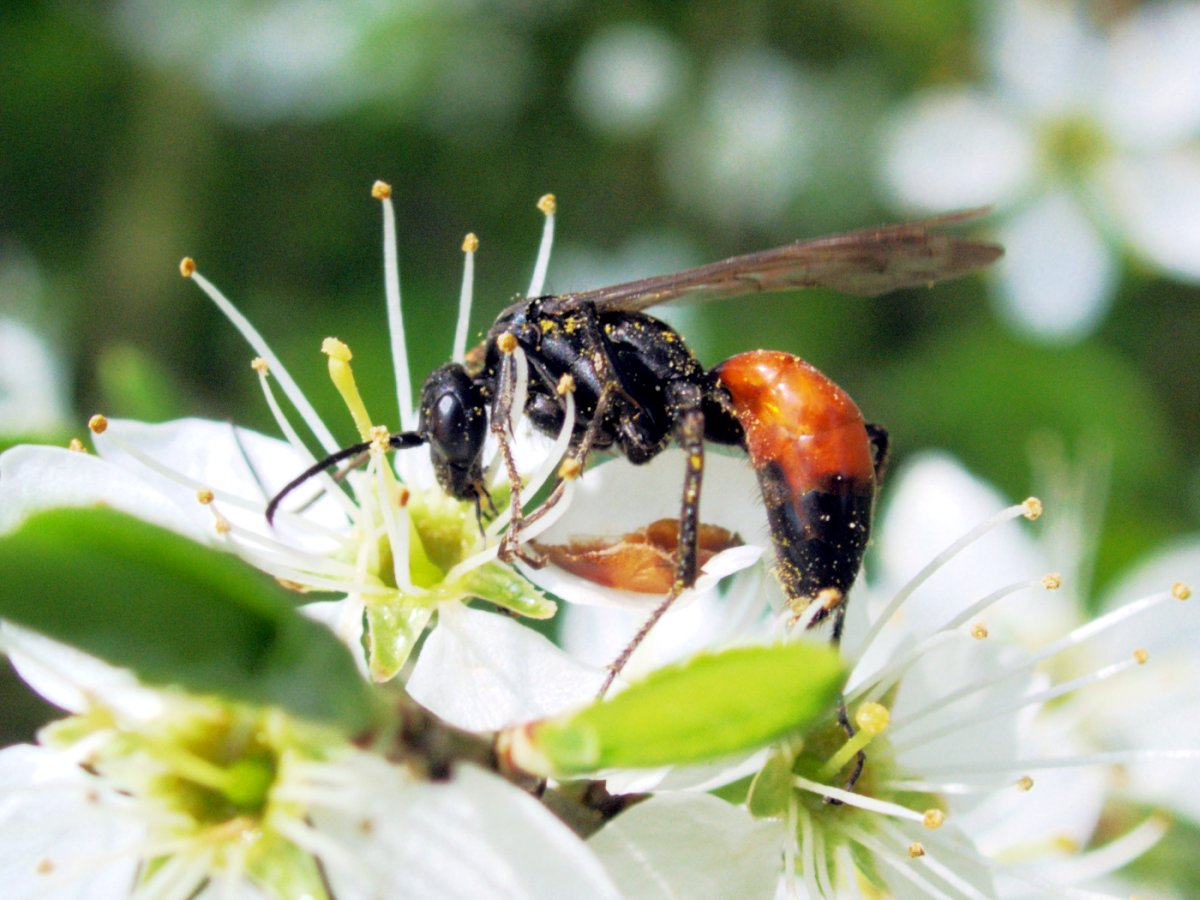

Scientific classification
- Domain: Eukaryota
- Kingdom: Animalia
- Phylum: Arthropoda
- Class: Insecta
- Order: Hymenoptera
- Family: Pompilidae
- Subfamily: Pepsinae
- Genus: Priocnemis; Schiødte, 1837

Type species
- Sphex exaltata Fabricius, 1775

= Priocnemis =

Genus of wasps

Priocnemis is a genus of pepsine spider wasp containing around 30 species.

== Species list ==
- Priocnemis aequalis (Banks, 1919)
- Priocnemis agilis (Shuckard, 1837)
- Priocnemis carbonarius (Smith, 1855)
- Priocnemis conformis Smith, 1876
- Priocnemis confusor Wahis, 2006
- Priocnemis cordivalvata Haupt, 1927
- Priocnemis coriacea (Dahlbom, 1843)
- Priocnemis cornica (Say, 1836)
- Priocnemis crawi Harris 1987
- Priocnemis enslini Haupt, 1927
- Priocnemis exaltata (Fabricius, 1775)
- Priocnemis fallax Verhoeff, 1922
- Priocnemis fennica Wahis, 1986
- Priocnemis germana (Cresson, 1867)
- Priocnemis hyalinata (Fabricius, 1793)
- Priocnemis minorata Banks, 1912
- Priocnemis minuta (Vander Linden, 1827)
- Priocnemis monachus (Smith, 1855)
- Priocnemis nebulosus Dahlbom, 1843
- Priocnemis notha (Cresson, 1867)
- Priocnemis ordishi Harris, 1987
- Priocnemis parvula (Dahlbom, 1845)
- Priocnemis pellipleuris Wahis, 1998
- Priocnemis perturbator (Harris, 1780)
- Priocnemis pusilla Schiødte, 1837
- Priocnemis schioedtei Haupt, 1927
- Priocnemis susterai Haupt, 1927
- Priocnemis vulgaris (Dufour, 1841)
