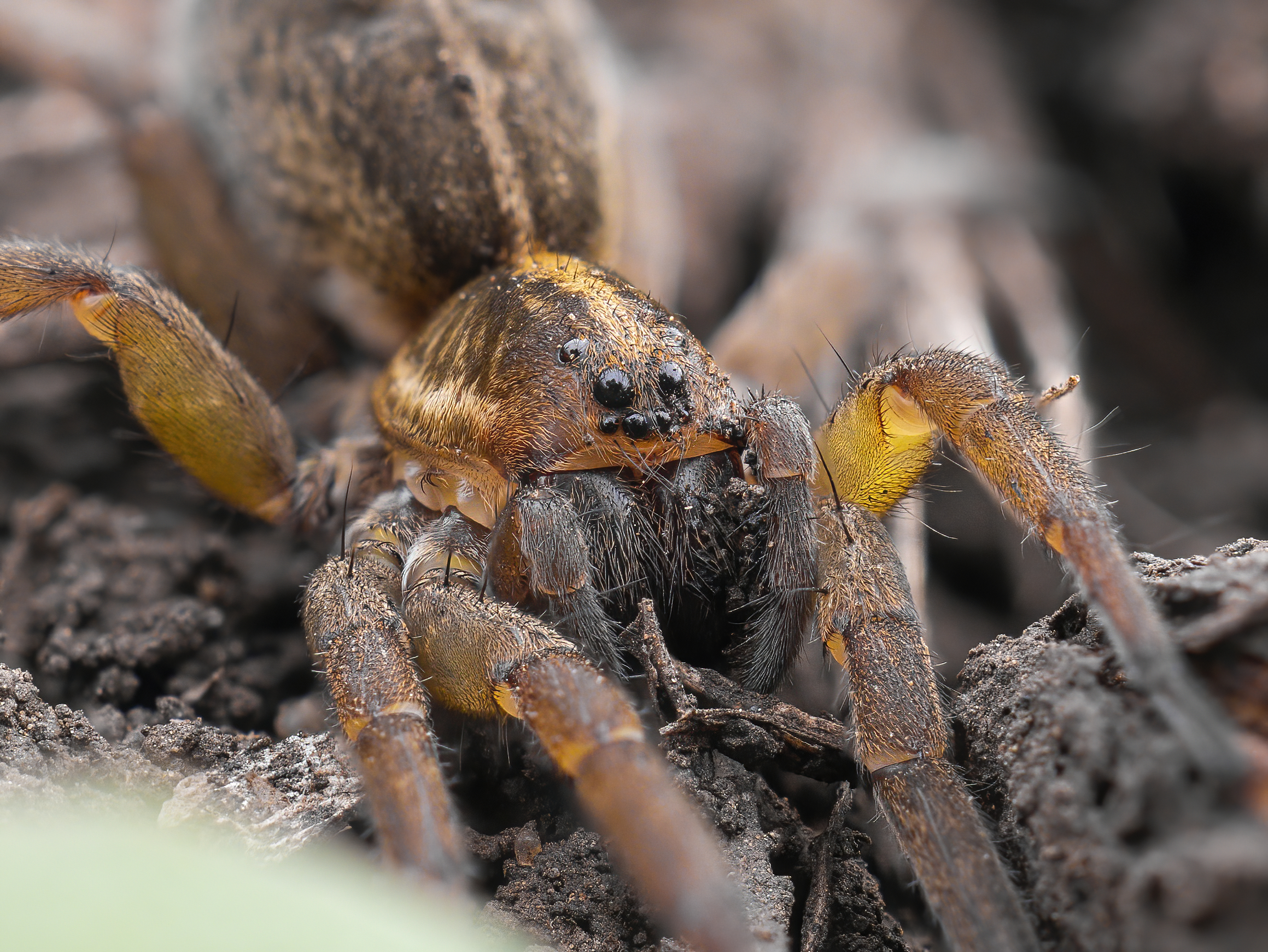

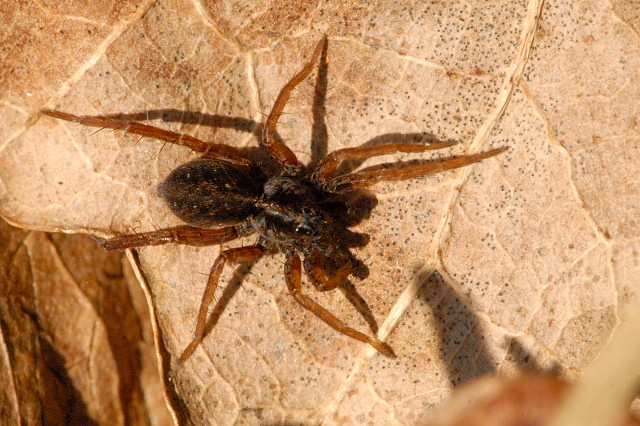

Scientific classification
- Kingdom: Animalia
- Phylum: Arthropoda
- Subphylum: Chelicerata
- Class: Arachnida
- Order: Araneae
- Infraorder: Araneomorphae
- Family: Lycosidae
- Genus: Trochosa
- Species: T. ruricola

Binomial name
- Trochosa ruricola (De Geer, 1778)

= Trochosa ruricola =

Rustic wolf spider

Species of spider

Trochosa ruricola is a wolf spider whose common name is rustic wolf spider. The females are 15 mm (0.6 in) but can reach 25 mm (1.0 in), and the males are 10 mm (0.4 in). Both sexes are dark brown and have a pale band that runs down to the carapace and continues to the abdomen.

The spider hunts on the ground and often gets caught in pitfall traps. Females carry an egg sac around on their abdomen for around 3 weeks until spiderlings emerge and gather on the mother's back.

Its habitat is in grassland, woodland, scrub, and lawns of temperate Asia, Europe, and North America. Its distribution: "Europe to China, Japan, Korea. Introduced to North America, Cuba, Puerto Rico, Bermuda".
