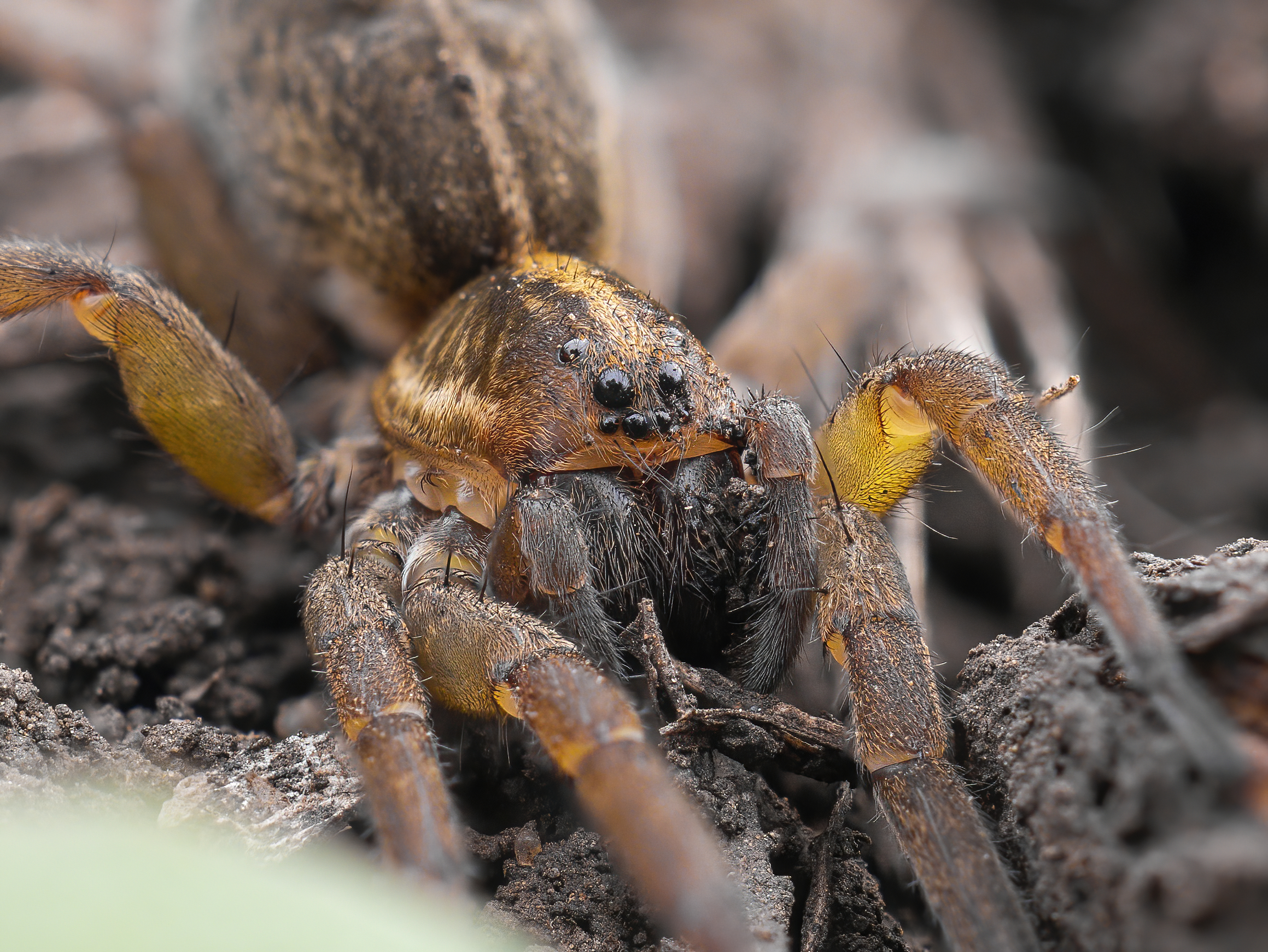
- Trochosa ruricola, the rustic wolf spider
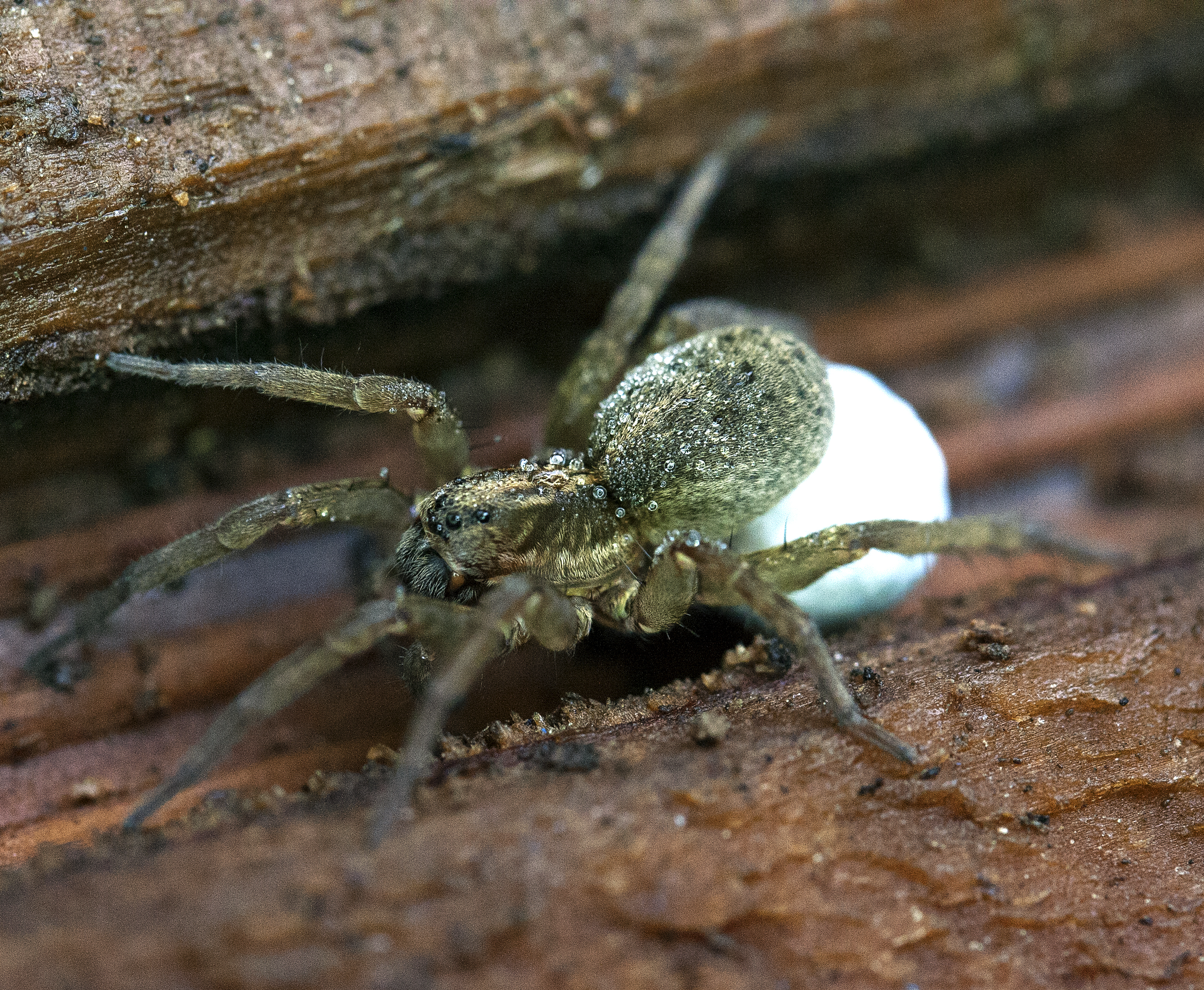
- Trochosa sp. with egg sac

Scientific classification
- Kingdom: Animalia
- Phylum: Arthropoda
- Subphylum: Chelicerata
- Class: Arachnida
- Order: Araneae
- Infraorder: Araneomorphae
- Family: Lycosidae
- Genus: Trochosa; C. L. Koch, 1847

Species
- 93, see text

Synonyms
- Trochosina Simon, 1885; Caporiaccosa Roewer, 1960; Metatrochosina Roewer, 1960; Piratosa Roewer, 1960; Trochosippa Roewer, 1960

= Trochosa =

Genus of spiders

Trochosa is a large wolf spider genus found worldwide.

They are free-running ground dwellers.

== Description ==
Trochosa are medium-sized spiders with general brown coloration. The body and legs are hairy and characteristically marked.

The carapace has a characteristic broad pale central band that is expanded anteriorly and contains two darker patches of variable extent and shape. The anterior row of eyes is slightly wider than the second row (the posterior median eyes).

The legs are stout and not very long compared to body size. The fourth tibia has a proximal spine dorsally that is usually thinner or more drawn out than the distal one, and is sometimes reduced to a bristle.

== Taxonomy ==
This genus is well-known in Europe and North America but has never been properly revised from Africa. The male genitalia closely resemble those of Hogna, making them of limited use for generic diagnosis.

== Species ==
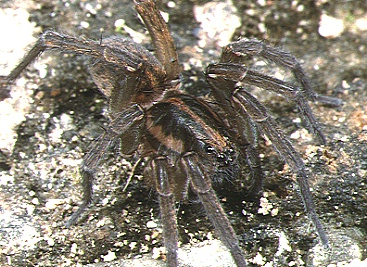
T. aquatica

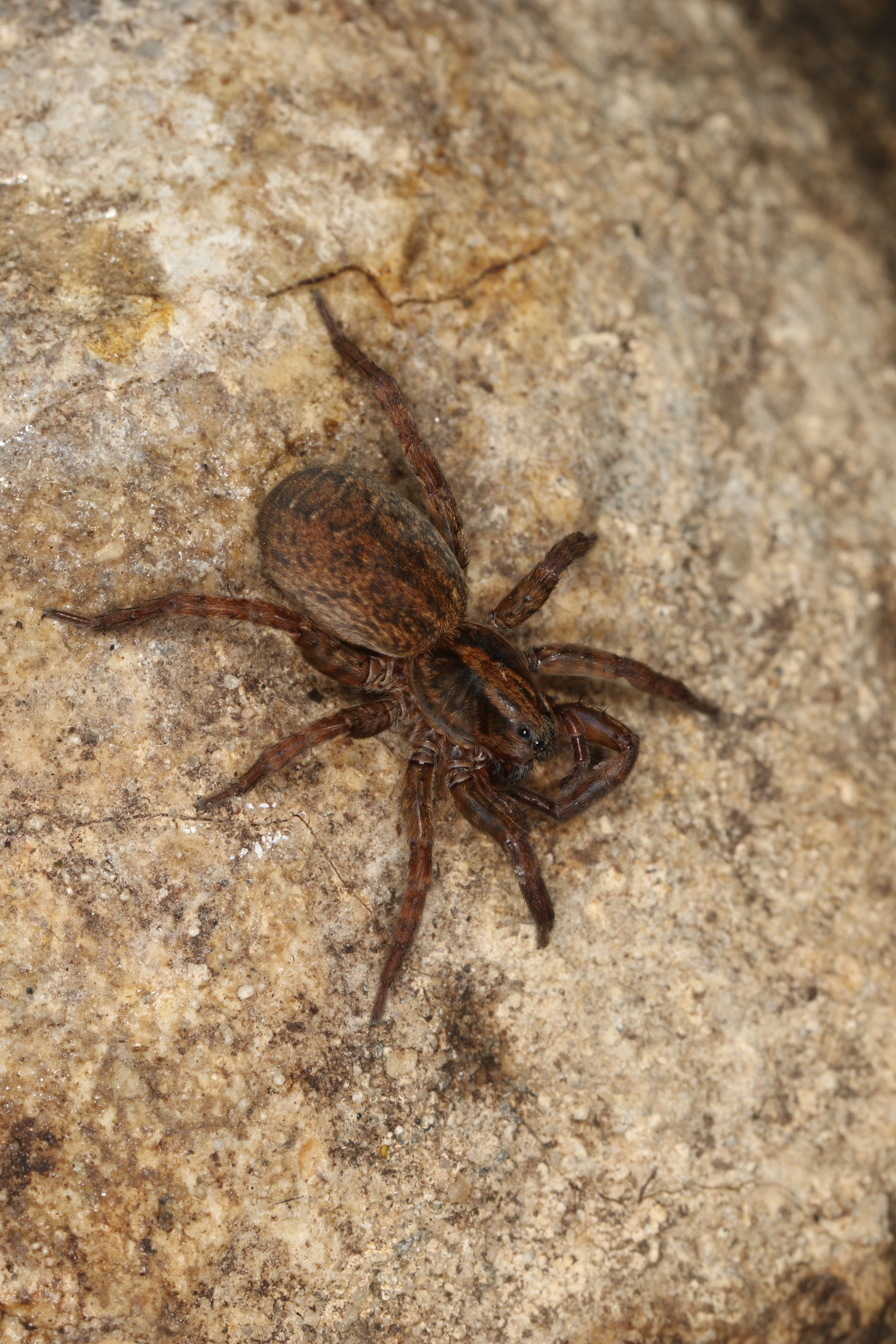
T. ruricola

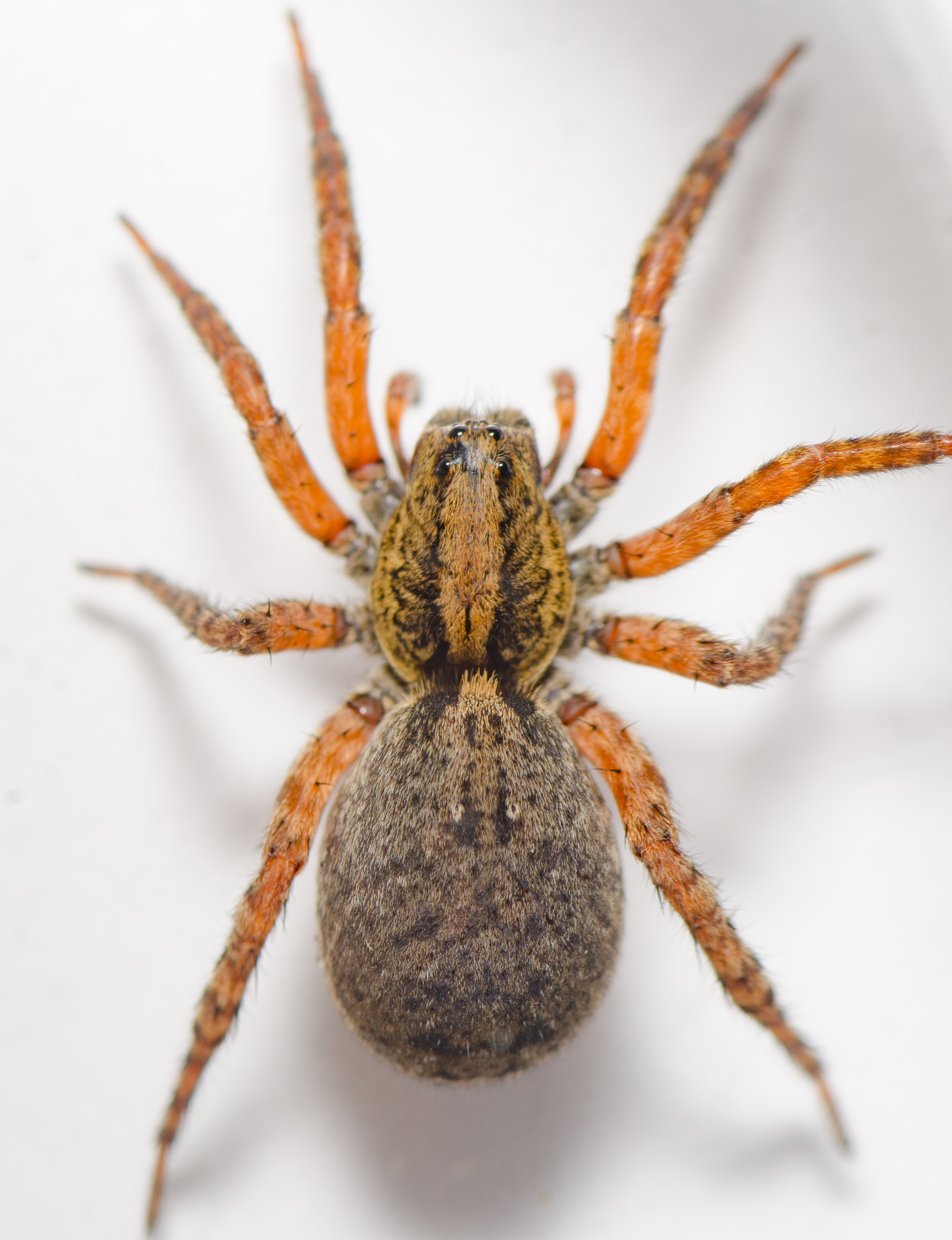
T. sepulchralis

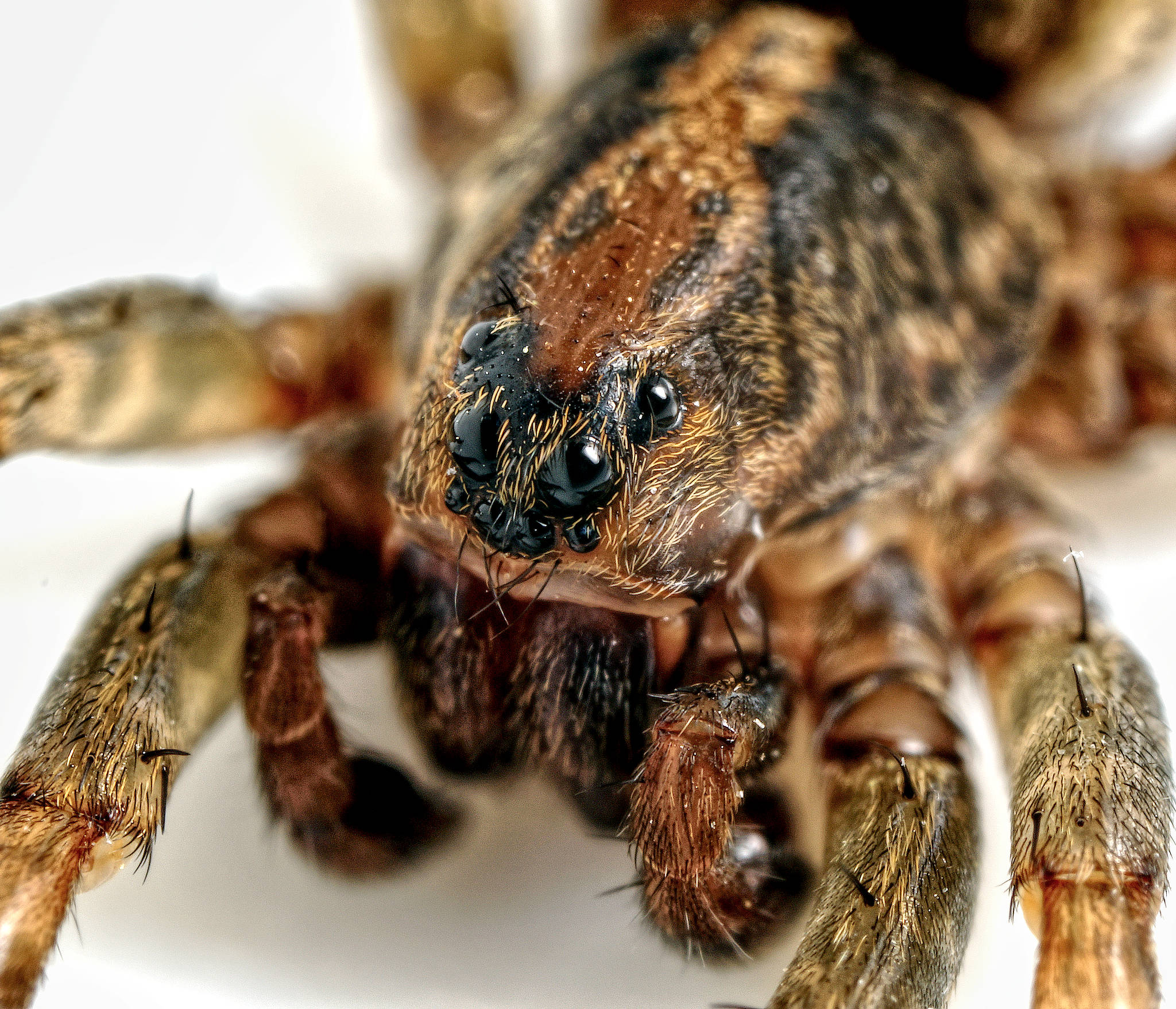
T. terricola

As of October 2025, this genus includes 93 species:

- Trochosa abdita (Gertsch, 1934) – United States
- Trochosa adjacens O. Pickard-Cambridge, 1885 – China (Yarkand)
- Trochosa albifrons (Roewer, 1960) – DR Congo
- Trochosa albipilosa (Roewer, 1960) – South Africa
- Trochosa albomarginata (Roewer, 1960) – Zimbabwe
- Trochosa alpina X. Y. Zhang & Z. S. Zhang, 2025 – China
- Trochosa alviolai Barrion & Litsinger, 1995 – Philippines
- Trochosa aperta (Roewer, 1960) – Namibia
- Trochosa aquatica Tanaka, 1985 – China, Korea, Japan
- Trochosa arctosina Caporiacco, 1947 – Venezuela, Guyana
- Trochosa bannaensis Yin & Chen, 1995 – China, Laos
- Trochosa beltran (Mello-Leitão, 1942) – Argentina
- Trochosa bukobae (Strand, 1916) – East Africa
- Trochosa cachetiensis Mcheidze, 1997 – Caucasus (Russia, Georgia)
- Trochosa canapii Barrion & Litsinger, 1995 – Philippines
- Trochosa charmina (Strand, 1916) – Cameroon
- Trochosa corporaali (Reimoser, 1935) – China
- Trochosa dentichelis Buchar, 1997 – Bhutan, India
- Trochosa eberlanzi (Roewer, 1960) – Namibia
- Trochosa entebbensis (Lessert, 1915) – DR Congo, Uganda, Tanzania
- Trochosa eugeni (Roewer, 1951) – South Africa
- Trochosa fabella (Karsch, 1879) – West, Central Africa
- Trochosa fageli Roewer, 1960 – Congo
- Trochosa fusca (Keyserling, 1877) – Central America, Caribbean
- Trochosa gentilis (Roewer, 1960) – Cameroon
- Trochosa glarea McKay, 1979 – Australia (Queensland)
- Trochosa gravelyi Buchar, 1976 – Nepal
- Trochosa guatemala Chamberlin & Ivie, 1942 – Guatemala
- Trochosa gunturensis Patel & Reddy, 1993 – India
- Trochosa hirtipes Ponomarev, 2009 – Russia (Caucasus)
- Trochosa hispanica Simon, 1870 – Mediterranean to Central Asia, Iran
- Trochosa hoggi (Lessert, 1926) – Tanzania
- Trochosa honggiana Barrion, Barrion-Dupo & Heong, 2013 – China (Hainan)
- Trochosa humicola Bertkau, 1880 – Haiti, Brazil, Guyana
- Trochosa hungarica Herman, 1879 – Hungary
- Trochosa immaculata Savelyeva, 1972 – Kazakhstan
- Trochosa insignis O. Pickard-Cambridge, 1898 – Costa Rica
- Trochosa intermedia (Roewer, 1960) – Zimbabwe
- Trochosa iviei (Gertsch & Wallace, 1937) – Mexico
- Trochosa kaieteurensis (Gertsch & Wallace, 1937) – Guyana
- Trochosa kalukanai (Simon, 1900) – Hawaii
- Trochosa kaswabilengae (Roewer, 1960) – Congo
- Trochosa liberiana (Roewer, 1960) – Liberia
- Trochosa longa Qu, Peng & Yin, 2010 – China
- Trochosa lucasi (Roewer, 1951) – Canary Islands
- Trochosa lugubris O. Pickard-Cambridge, 1885 – Tajikistan, Afghanistan, China (Yarkand)
- Trochosa magdalenensis (Strand, 1914) – Colombia
- Trochosa magna (Roewer, 1960) – Liberia
- Trochosa malayana (Doleschall, 1859) – Indonesia (Ambon)
- Trochosa marusiki Shafaie, Koponen, Nadolny, Kunt & Mirshamsi, 2022 – Iran
- Trochosa masumbica (Strand, 1916) – East Africa
- Trochosa melloi Roewer, 1951 – Brazil
- Trochosa meruensis (Lessert, 1926) – Tanzania
- Trochosa minima (Roewer, 1960) – Congo, Kenya
- Trochosa modesta (Roewer, 1960) – South Africa
- Trochosa moluccensis Thorell, 1878 – Indonesia (Ambon)
- Trochosa mossambicus (Roewer, 1960) – Mozambique
- Trochosa mundamea Roewer, 1960 – Cameroon, Sierra Leone
- Trochosa nigerrima (Roewer, 1960) – South Africa
- Trochosa niveopilosa (Mello-Leitão, 1938) – Argentina
- Trochosa nossibeensis (Strand, 1907) – Madagascar
- Trochosa obscura (Roewer, 1960) – Rwanda
- Trochosa obscura (Mello-Leitão, 1943) – Argentina
- Trochosa papakula (Strand, 1911) – Indonesia (Moluccas), New Guinea
- Trochosa paranaensis (Mello-Leitão, 1937) – Brazil
- Trochosa pardaloides (Mello-Leitão, 1937) – Brazil
- Trochosa pardosella (Strand, 1906) – Ethiopia
- Trochosa parviguttata (Strand, 1906) – Ethiopia
- Trochosa pelengena (Roewer, 1960) – Congo
- Trochosa praetecta L. Koch, 1875 – Ethiopia
- Trochosa presumptuosa (Holmberg, 1876) – Argentina
- Trochosa propinqua O. Pickard-Cambridge, 1885 – India
- Trochosa pseudofurva (Strand, 1906) – Cameroon
- Trochosa quinquefasciata Roewer, 1960 – Tanzania
- Trochosa reichardtiana (Strand, 1916) – Hispaniola
- Trochosa reimoseri Bristowe, 1931 – Indonesia (Krakatau)
- Trochosa robusta (Simon, 1876) – Europe, Turkey, Caucasus, Russia (Europe to South Siberia), Iran, China, Japan
- Trochosa ruandanica (Roewer, 1960) – Rwanda
- Trochosa ruricola (De Geer, 1778) – Europe, Turkey, Caucasus, Russia (Europe to Far East), Kazakhstan, Iran, Central Asia, China, Japan, Korea. Introduced to North America, Bermuda, Caribbean (type species)
- Trochosa ruricoloides Schenkel, 1963 – India, China, Taiwan, Laos, Thailand, Malaysia, Indonesia, Papua New Guinea
- Trochosa sanlorenziana (Petrunkevitch, 1925) – Panama
- Trochosa semoni Simon, 1896 – Indonesia (Java)
- Trochosa sepulchralis (Montgomery, 1902) – United States
- Trochosa sericea (Simon, 1898) – Brazil
- Trochosa spinipalpis (F. O. Pickard-Cambridge, 1895) – Europe, Caucasus, Russia (Europe to South Siberia), China, Japan
- Trochosa suiningensis Peng, Yin, Zhang & Kim, 1997 – China
- Trochosa tenuis (Roewer, 1960) – Ethiopia
- Trochosa terricola Thorell, 1856 – North America, Europe, Turkey, Caucasus, Russia (Europe to Far East), Kazakhstan, Iran, Central Asia, China, Japan
- Trochosa unmunsanensis Paik, 1994 – Korea
- Trochosa urbana O. Pickard-Cambridge, 1876 – North Africa, Ethiopia to Seychelles, Madagascar (Nosy Be), Israel, Iraq
- Trochosa ursina (Schenkel, 1936) – China
- Trochosa vulvella (Strand, 1907) – Japan
- Trochosa wuchangensis (Schenkel, 1963) – China
