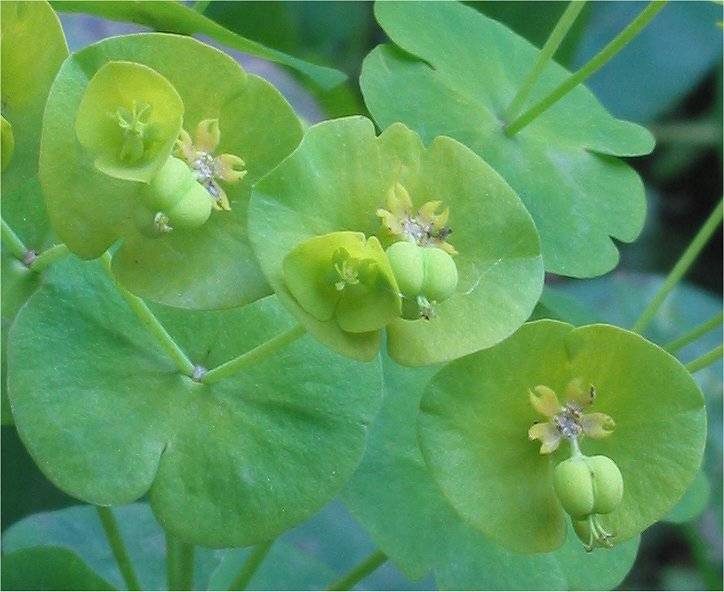

Scientific classification
- Kingdom: Plantae
- Clade: Embryophytes
- Clade: Tracheophytes
- Clade: Spermatophytes
- Clade: Angiosperms
- Clade: Eudicots
- Clade: Rosids
- Order: Malpighiales
- Family: Euphorbiaceae
- Genus: Euphorbia
- Species: E. amygdaloides

Binomial name
- Euphorbia amygdaloides L.

= Euphorbia amygdaloides =

Species of flowering plant

Euphorbia amygdaloides, the wood spurge, is a species of flowering plant in the family Euphorbiaceae, native to woodland locations in Europe, Turkey and the Caucasus. It is a bushy evergreen perennial, growing to a height of 80 cm (31 in), with dark green slightly hairy leaves about 6 cm (2 in) long. The complex green-yellow inflorescence (cyathium), typical of Euphorbia, appears in late spring and early summer.

It is among the few plants that thrive in the dry shade of trees, where it is used as groundcover. It spreads rapidly by underground rhizomes and can become invasive, though relatively easy to remove.

One form known is Euphorbia 'Efanthia'. The subspecies E. amygdaloides subsp. robbiae (Turrill) Stace, known as Mrs Robb's bonnet, is grown as a garden plant, and has gained the Royal Horticultural Society's Award of Garden Merit.

The milky latex of the plant is toxic and can cause irritation on contact with the skin.
