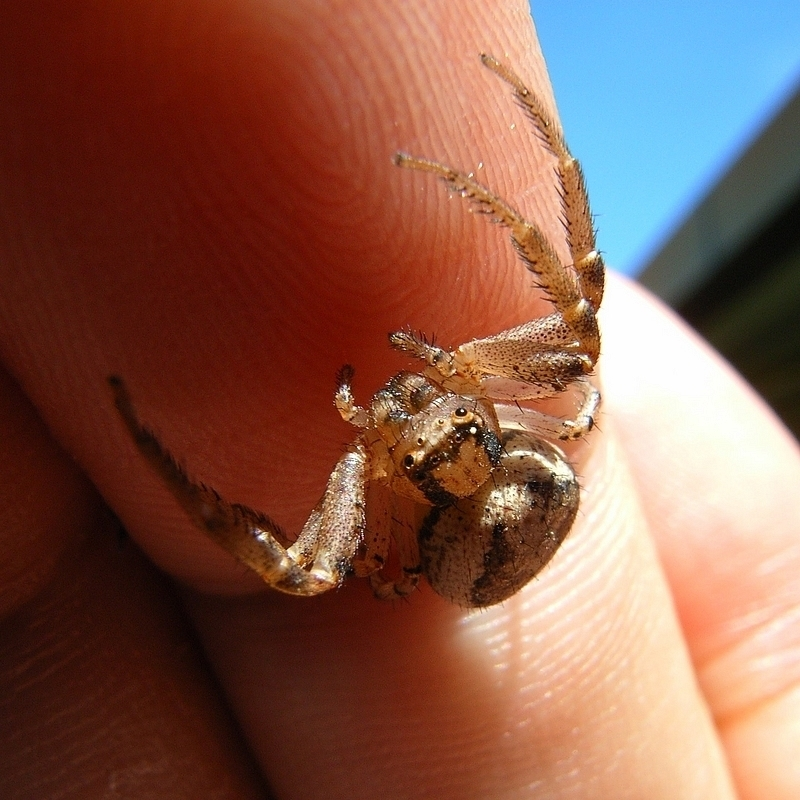

Scientific classification
- Kingdom: Animalia
- Phylum: Arthropoda
- Subphylum: Chelicerata
- Class: Arachnida
- Order: Araneae
- Infraorder: Araneomorphae
- Family: Thomisidae
- Genus: Xysticus
- Species: X. croceus

Binomial name
- Xysticus croceus Fox, 1937

Synonyms
- X. ephippiatus X. sujatai

= Xysticus croceus =

Species of spider

Xysticus croceus is a crab spider in the genus Xysticus found in Nepal, Bhutan, China, Korea, Taiwan, and in Japan, where it is called "yami-iro kani-gumo". It is about 7 mm long

It looks in grass and fallen leaves for prey to eat. It hides under stones in the winter, and is often seen in spring and early summer.
