= Xysticus lucifugus =

Xysticus Ground Crab Spider

Conservation status
- Least Concern (SANBI Red List)

Scientific classification
- Kingdom: Animalia
- Phylum: Arthropoda
- Subphylum: Chelicerata
- Class: Arachnida
- Order: Araneae
- Infraorder: Araneomorphae
- Family: Thomisidae
- Genus: Xysticus
- Species: X. lucifugus

Binomial name
- Xysticus lucifugus Lawrence, 1937

Species of spider

Xysticus lucifugus is a species of spider in the family Thomisidae. It is endemic to South Africa and is commonly known as xysticus ground crab spider.

== Distribution ==
Xysticus lucifugus is endemic to South Africa, where it occurs across the provinces of KwaZulu-Natal, Limpopo, Mpumalanga, and Western Cape. The species has a wide geographical range and occurs at altitudes ranging from 15 to 1,698 m above sea level.

Notable locations include Hluhluwe Nature Reserve, Ndumo Game Reserve, Phinda Game Reserve, Ophathe Game Reserve, Sovenga Hill, Potgietersrus/Mokopane, Kruger National Park, Carolina, De Hoop Nature Reserve, Kirstenbosch National Botanical Garden, and Table Mountain National Park.

== Habitat and ecology ==
Xysticus lucifugus are ground dwellers that inhabit forest, fynbos, and savanna biomes.

== Conservation ==
Xysticus lucifugus is listed as Least Concern by the South African National Biodiversity Institute due to its wide geographical range. The species is protected in several protected areas including Hluhluwe Nature Reserve, Ndumo Game Reserve, Phinda Game Reserve, Ophathe Game Reserve, Kruger National Park, De Hoop Nature Reserve, and Table Mountain National Park.

== Etymology ==
The specific name is Latin for "fleeing the light".

== Taxonomy ==
The species was originally described by Reginald Frederick Lawrence in 1937 from Hluhluwe in KwaZulu-Natal. African species of Xysticus have not been revised. The species is known only from the female, and more sampling is needed to collect the male.
