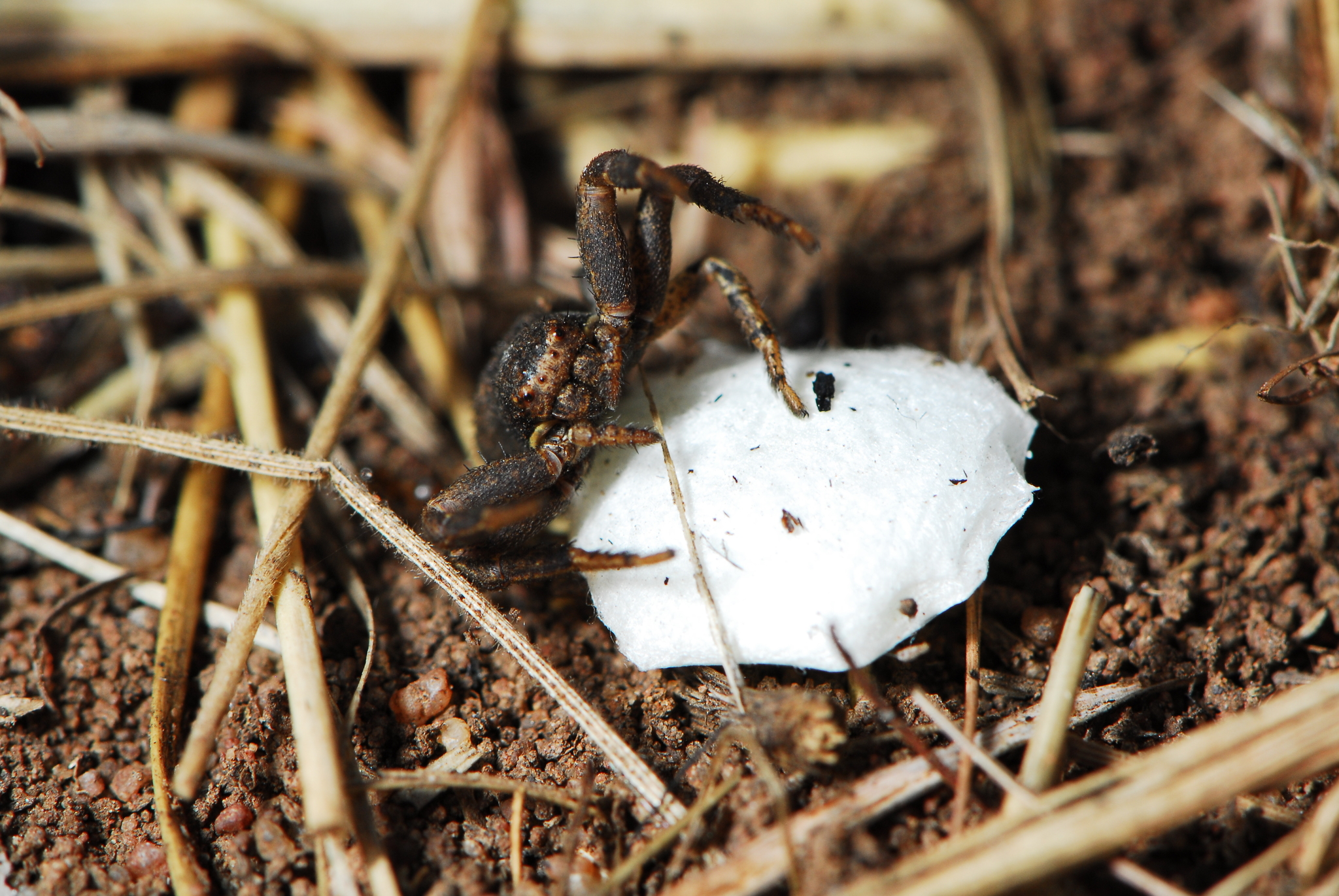
- female with egg sac
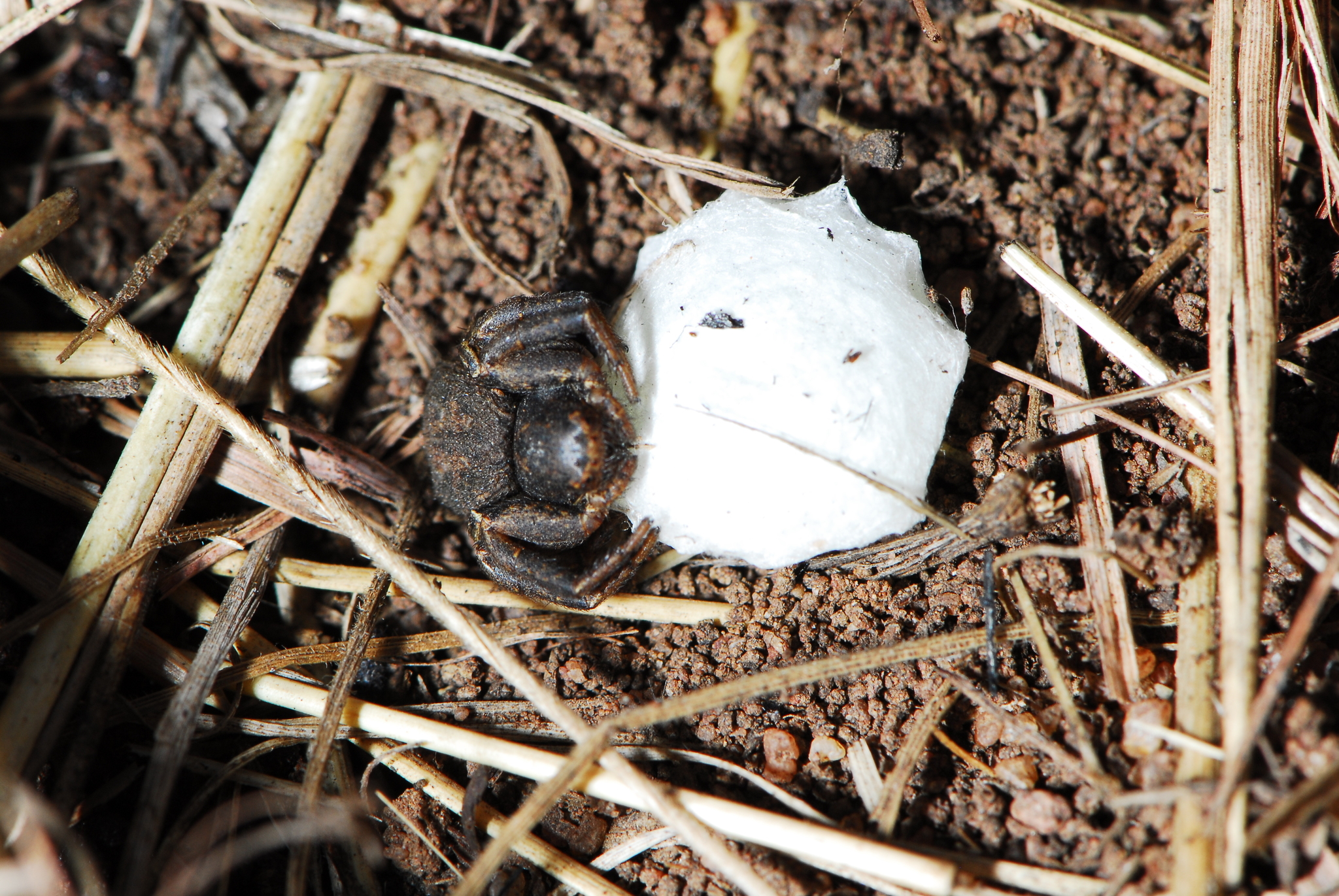
- female with egg sac

Scientific classification
- Kingdom: Animalia
- Phylum: Arthropoda
- Subphylum: Chelicerata
- Class: Arachnida
- Order: Araneae
- Infraorder: Araneomorphae
- Family: Thomisidae
- Genus: Xysticus
- Species: X. fagei

Binomial name
- Xysticus fagei Lessert, 1919

= Xysticus fagei =

Fage's Ground Crab Spider

Species of spider

Xysticus fagei is a species of spider in the family Thomisidae. It is found in East Africa, Zimbabwe, and South Africa, and is commonly known as Fage's round crab spider. It is named for the French zoologist Louis Fage, and so should be pronounced /ˈfɑːʒiː/.

== Distribution ==
Xysticus fagei occurs in East Africa, Zimbabwe, and South Africa. In South Africa, the species is distributed across four provinces, Gauteng, Limpopo, Mpumalanga, and North West.

Notable South African locations include Kemptonpark, Irene, Polokwane Nature Reserve, Springbok Flats, Loskop Dam Nature Reserve, Mariepskop, Kruger National Park, and Rustenburg. The species occurs at altitudes ranging from 592 to 1,668 m above sea level.

== Habitat and ecology ==
Xysticus fagei is a free-living ground species typically found under stones during the day. The species inhabits grassland and savanna biomes.

== Conservation ==
Xysticus fagei is listed as Least Concern by the South African National Biodiversity Institute due to its wide geographical range. The species is protected in five protected areas including Polokwane Nature Reserve, Groenkloof Nature Reserve, Nylsvley Nature Reserve, Loskop Dam Nature Reserve, and Kruger National Park.

== Taxonomy ==
The species was originally described by Roger de Lessert in 1919 from Kiboscho in East Africa. African species of Xysticus have not been revised, and the species is known from both sexes.
