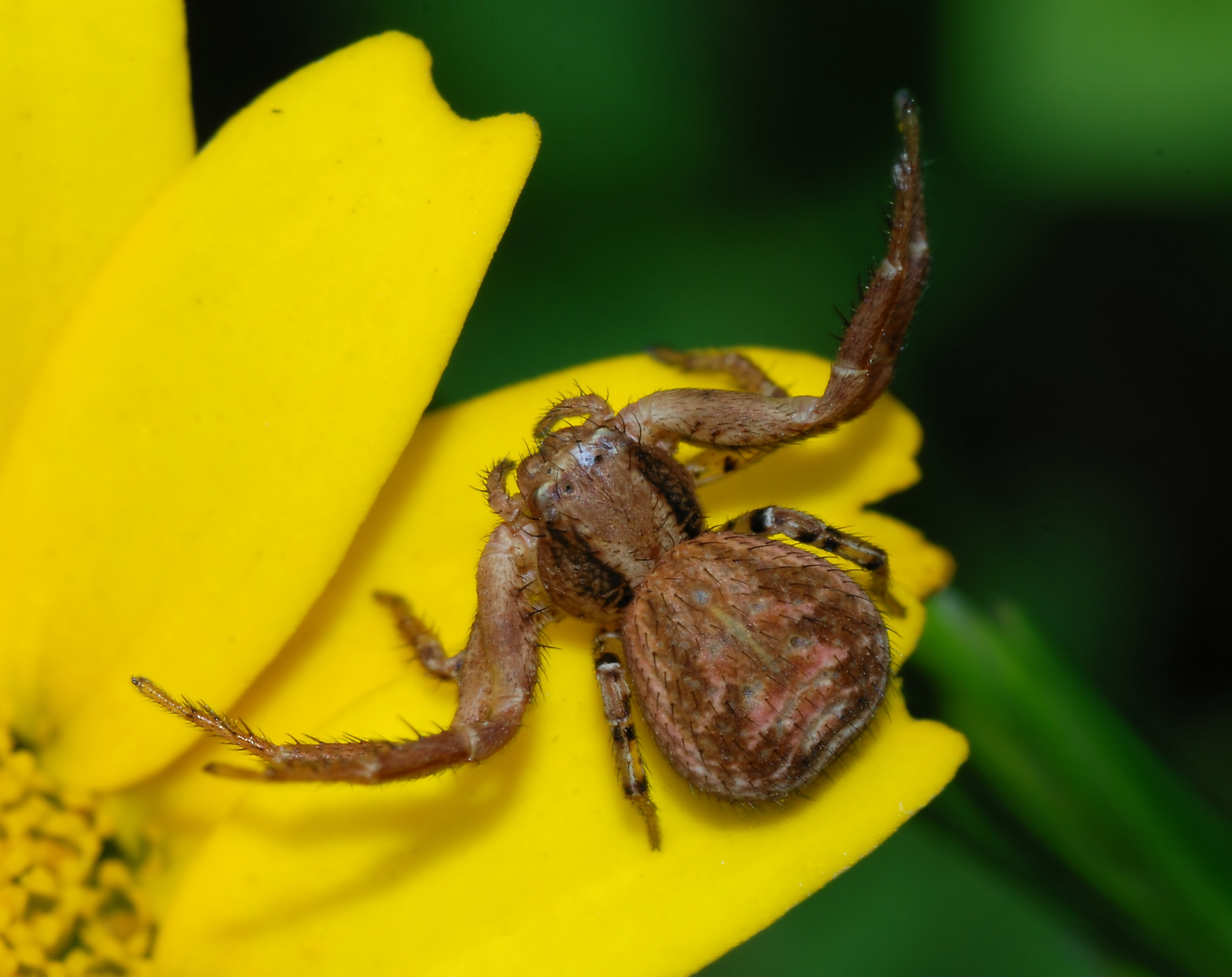
- Xysticus sp.
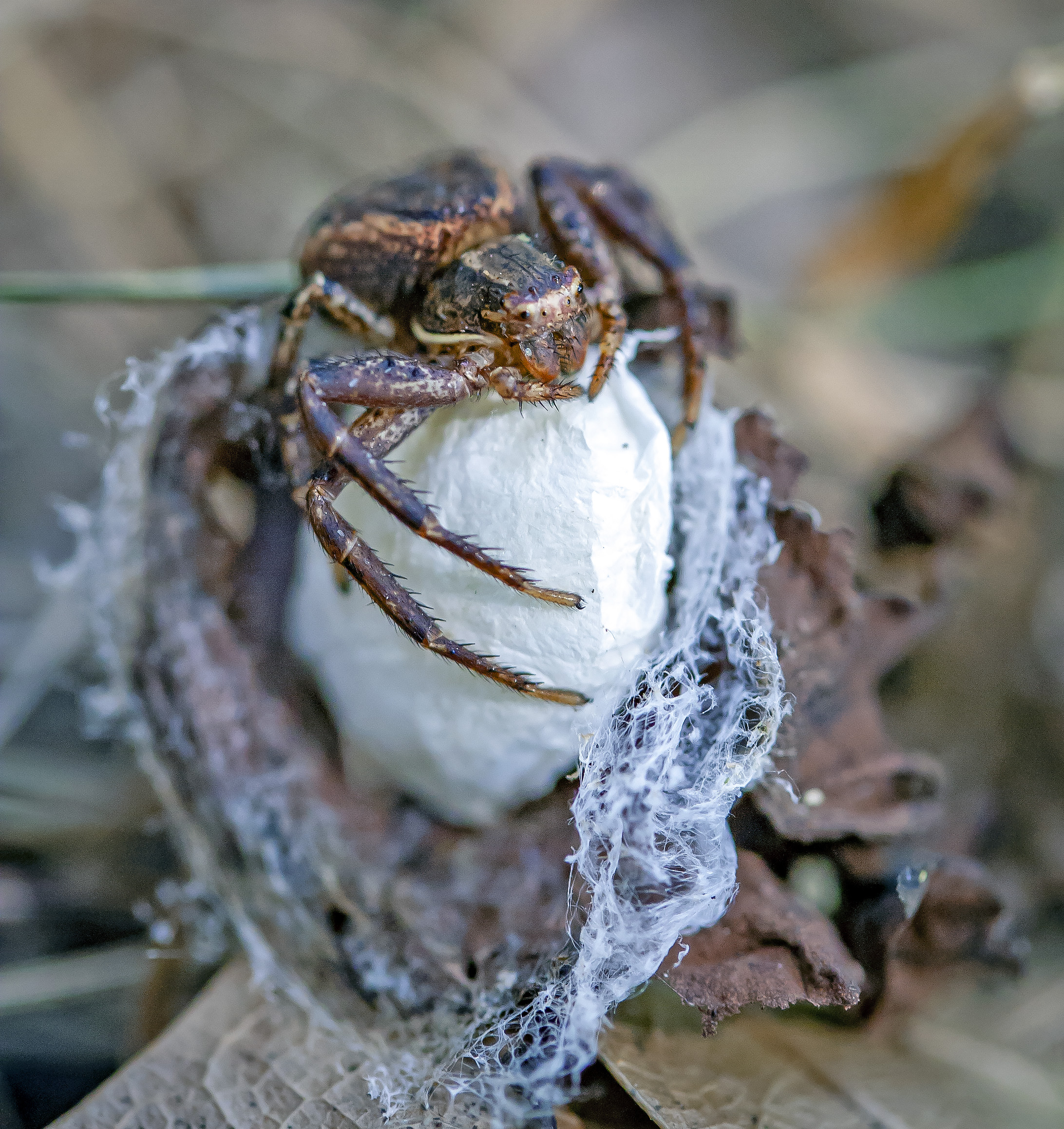
- Female Xysticus sp. with egg sac

Scientific classification
- Kingdom: Animalia
- Phylum: Arthropoda
- Subphylum: Chelicerata
- Class: Arachnida
- Order: Araneae
- Infraorder: Araneomorphae
- Family: Thomisidae
- Genus: Xysticus; C. L. Koch, 1835

Species
- 275, see text

= Xysticus =

Ground crab spiders Temporal range: Palaeogene–present

Genus of ground crab spiders

Xysticus is a genus of around 300 ground crab spider species described by C. L. Koch in 1835, belonging to the order Araneae, family Thomisidae.

The genus name is derived from the Ancient Greek root xyst, meaning "scraped, scraper".

== Behaviour ==
The spiders of the genus Xysticus do not build webs; like most Thomisidae they are ambush hunters and prefer to hunt near the ground (hence the common name "ground crab spiders"). They move slowly, and commonly hunt by stationing themselves in a high-traffic area and grabbing whatever arthropod passes close enough. Also like most other Thomisidae, they seize prey with their enlarged anterior two pairs of legs and kill it by a venomous bite.

== Description ==
Xysticus and Coriarachne are dark brown or reddish-brown crab spiders often encountered on weeds or trees. While similar to the 'flower spiders', they tend to have shorter, sturdier legs. Many, but not all, species have abdomens more patterned than most Thomisus species, rather like some of the Synema species. Some however, that are more terrestrial, resemble earth in colour and texture.

Most species of the genus Xysticus are small to medium sized spiders. They show a sexual dimorphism in size. Females of typical species reach a maximum of 10 millimetres (0.39 in) of body length, while their males are about 3–5 millimetres (0.12–0.20 in) long, about half the size of the females.

The basic colour of these species is usually brown, beige or gray. The prosoma is sometimes slightly smaller than the opisthosoma. In many species the front body shows in the middle a broad, pale longitudinal band. The opisthosoma is clearly flattened in most species and shows a median broad and dark leaf marking.

The species are often very similar to each other, and in most cases can be distinguished only by a microscopic examination of the reproductive organs.

=== Diagnostic characters ===
Members of this genus have a smooth or granulated integument and their colour is cryptic fawn to reddish brown to blend in with the soil surface. The body and legs are covered with simple setae, rarely blunt. The tibiae and metatarsi I and II each have more than three pairs of setae ventrally. They are all cryptic and difficult to identify, with genitalia playing an important role in distinguishing between species.

== Species ==
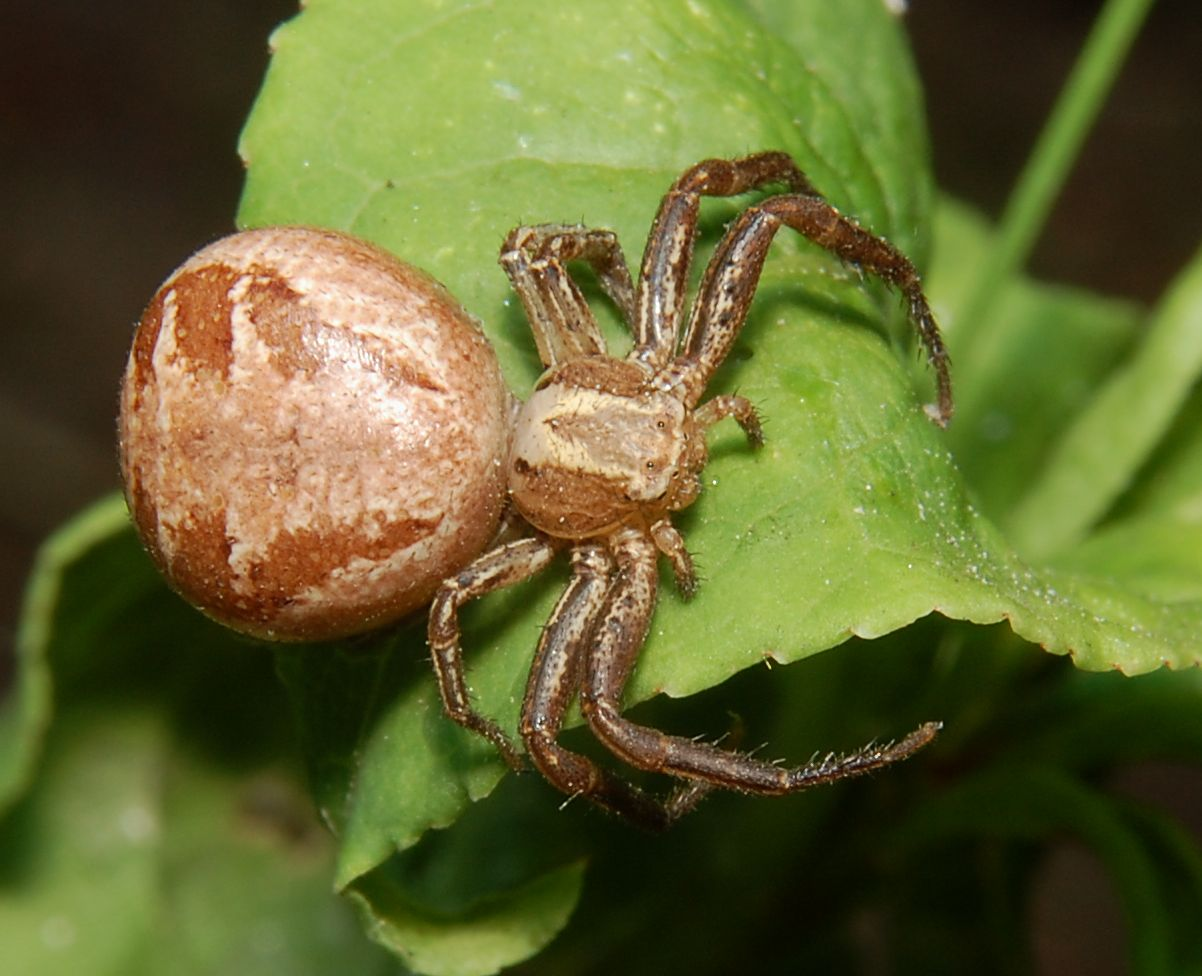
Xysticus audax

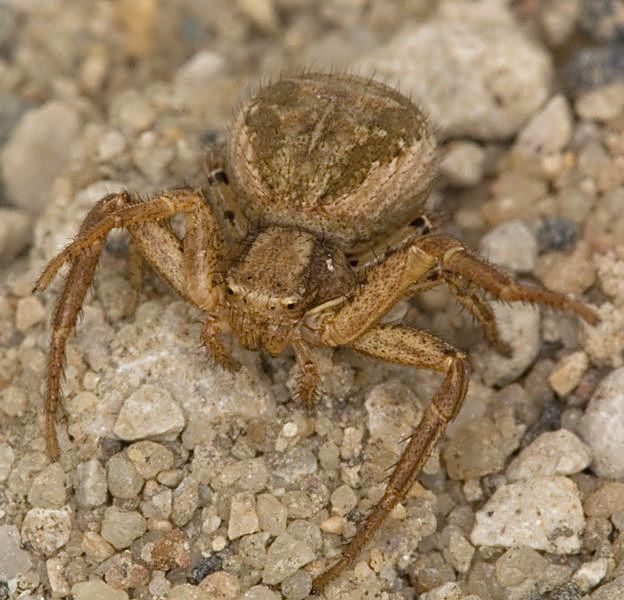
Xysticus kochi, female

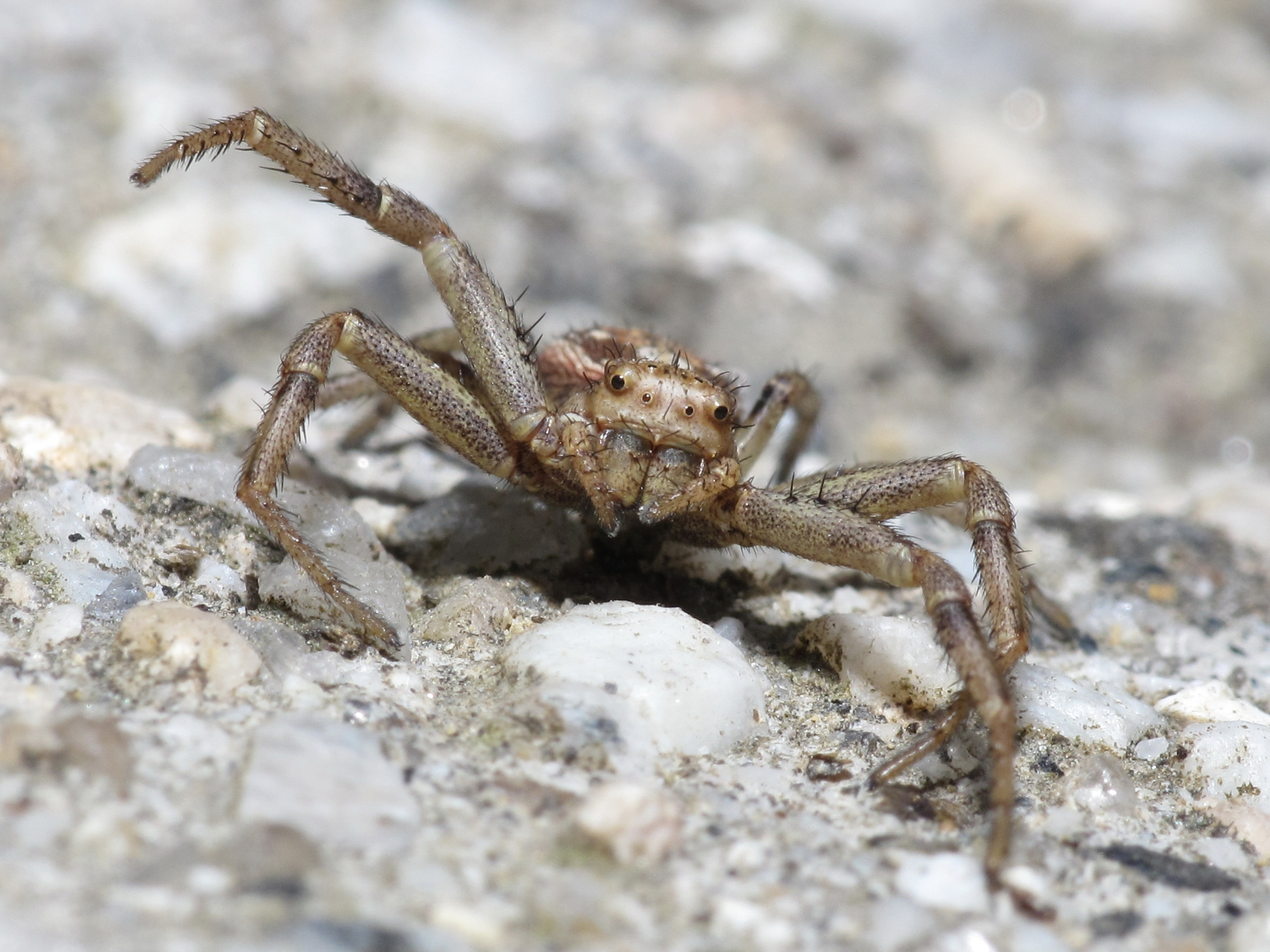
Xysticus cristatus

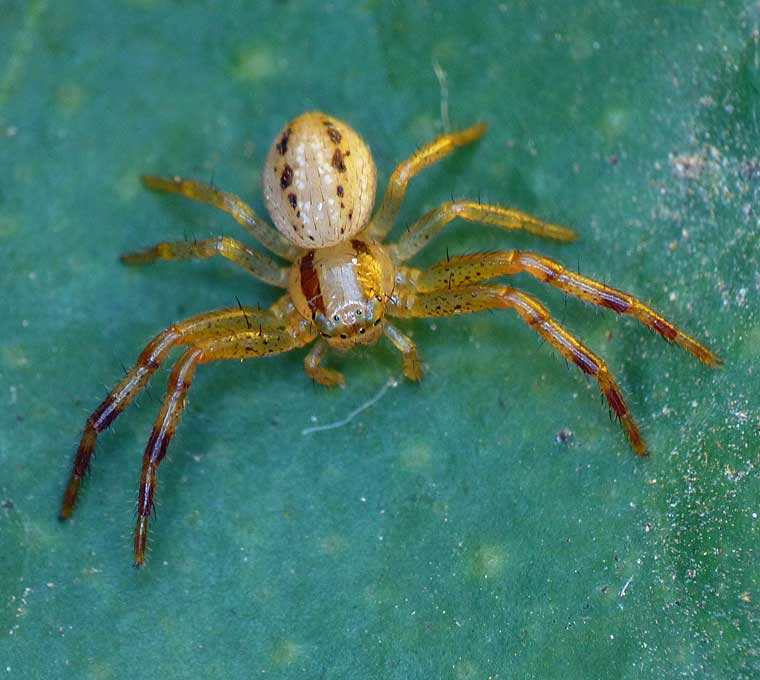
Xysticus bilimbatus

As of September 2025, this genus includes 275 species and ten subspecies.

These species have articles on Wikipedia:

- Xysticus alboniger Turnbull, Dondale & Redner, 1965 – Canada, United States
- Xysticus ampullatus Turnbull, Dondale & Redner, 1965 – Canada, United States
- Xysticus auctificus Keyserling, 1880 – Canada, United States
- Xysticus audax (Schrank, 1803) – Europe, Turkey, Caucasus, Russia (Europe to Far East), Kazakhstan, Iran, China, Korea, Japan (type species)
- Xysticus britcheri Gertsch, 1934 – Russia (Europe to Far East), Alaska, Canada, United States
- Xysticus californicus Keyserling, 1880 – Canada, United States, Mexico
- Xysticus canadensis Gertsch, 1934 – Russia (Europe to Far East), Canada, United States
- Xysticus concursus Gertsch, 1934 – United States
- Xysticus cristatus (Clerck, 1757) – Europe, Turkey, Caucasus, Russia (Europe to South Siberia), Kazakhstan, Iran, Central Asia, Nepal, China, Korea, Japan. Introduced to Canada, United States
- Xysticus croceus Fox, 1937 – India, Nepal, Bhutan, China, Taiwan, Korea, Japan, Vietnam
- Xysticus discursans Keyserling, 1880 – North America
- Xysticus elegans Keyserling, 1880 – Canada, United States
- Xysticus ellipticus Turnbull, Dondale & Redner, 1965 – Canada, United States
- Xysticus emertoni Keyserling, 1880 – Russia (Urals to Far East), Kazakhstan, Central Asia, China, Alaska, Canada, United States
- Xysticus fagei Lessert, 1919 – Tanzania, Zimbabwe, South Africa
- Xysticus ferox (Hentz, 1847) – Alaska, Canada, United States
- Xysticus fervidus Gertsch, 1953 – Canada, United States
- Xysticus fraternus Banks, 1895 – Canada, United States
- Xysticus funestus Keyserling, 1880 – North America
- Xysticus gosiutus Gertsch, 1933 – Canada, United States
- Xysticus gulosus Keyserling, 1880 – North America
- Xysticus havilandi Lawrence, 1942 – South Africa
- Xysticus locuples Keyserling, 1880 – North America
- Xysticus lucifugus Lawrence, 1937 – South Africa
- Xysticus luctans (C. L. Koch, 1845) – Canada, United States
- Xysticus luctuosus (Blackwall, 1836) – North America, Europe, Turkey, Caucasus, Russia (Europe to Far East), Kazakhstan, Iran, Central Asia
- Xysticus montanensis Keyserling, 1887 – Alaska, Canada, United States
- Xysticus mulleri Lawrence, 1952 – South Africa, Lesotho, Eswatini
- Xysticus namaquensis Simon, 1910 – South Africa
- Xysticus natalensis Lawrence, 1938 – Zimbabwe, Mozambique, South Africa, Lesotho, Eswatini
- Xysticus obscurus Collett, 1877 – North America, Europe, Russia (Europe to Far East)
- Xysticus pellax O. Pickard-Cambridge, 1894 – North America
- Xysticus pretiosus Gertsch, 1934 – Alaska, Canada, United States
- Xysticus punctatus Keyserling, 1880 – Canada, United States
- Xysticus sagittifer Lawrence, 1927 – Namibia, South Africa
- Xysticus simonstownensis Strand, 1909 – South Africa
- Xysticus texanus Banks, 1904 – United States, Mexico
- Xysticus triguttatus Keyserling, 1880 – Canada, United States
- Xysticus tugelanus Lawrence, 1942 – South Africa, Lesotho
- Xysticus ulmi (Hahn, 1831) – Europe, Turkey, Caucasus, Russia (Europe to Middle and South Siberia), Central Asia, China
- Xysticus urbensis Lawrence, 1952 – South Africa, Lesotho
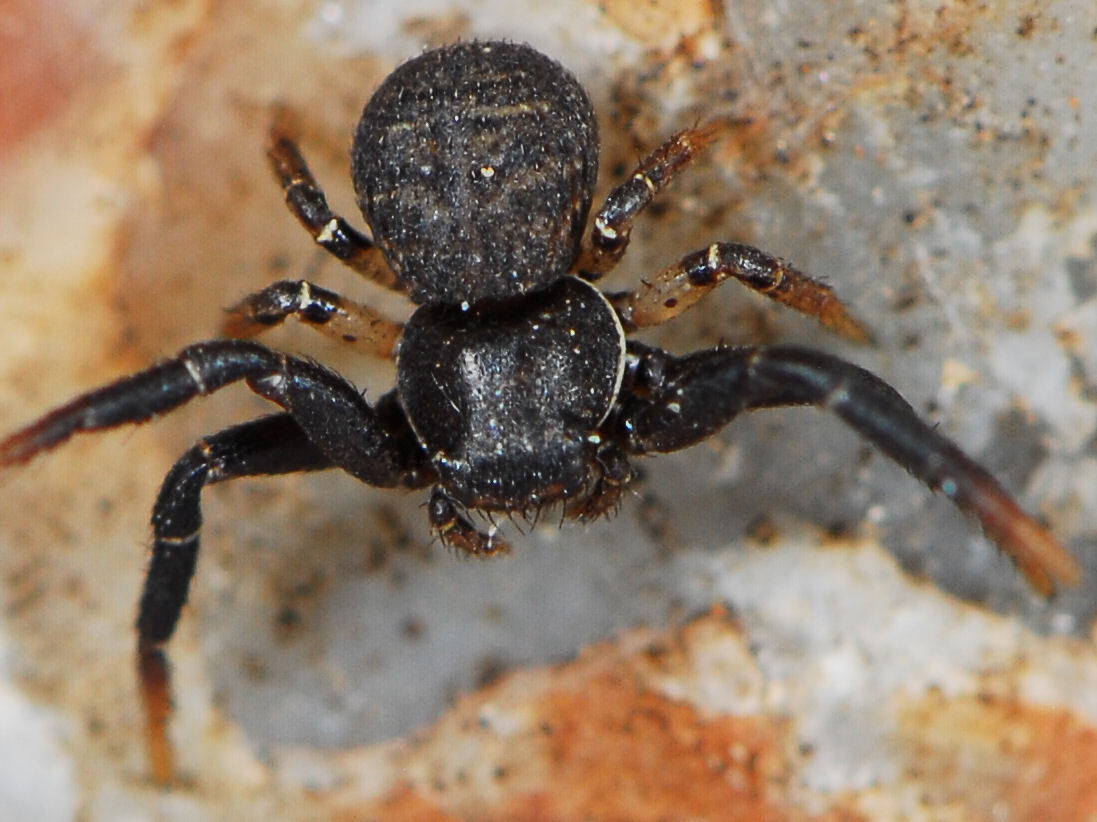
Xysticus havilandi

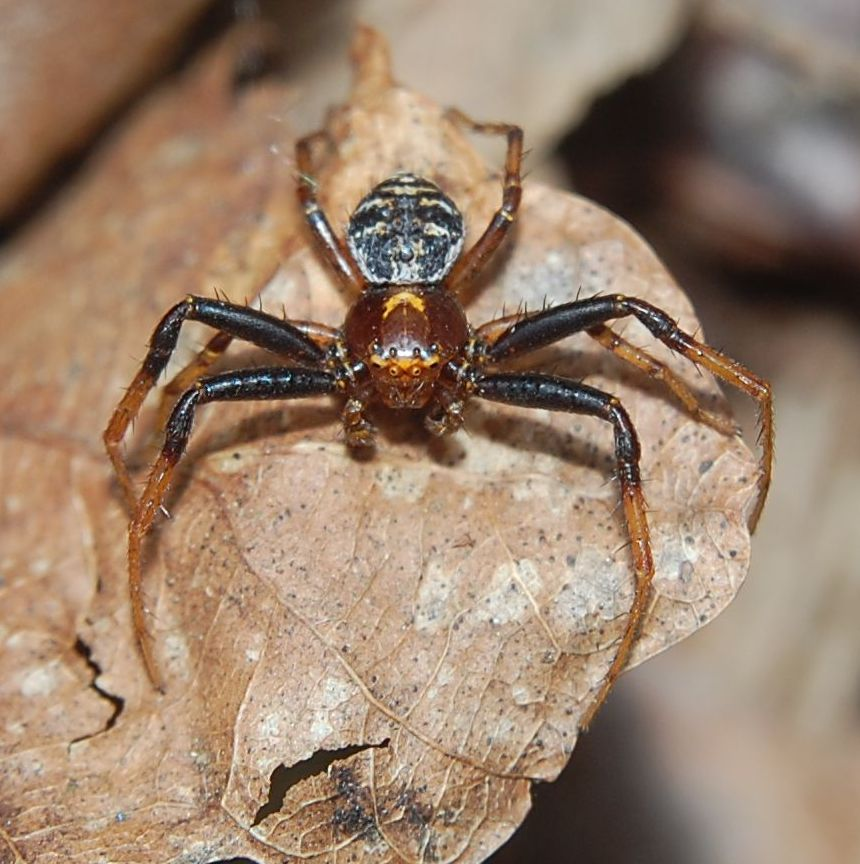
Xysticus lanio

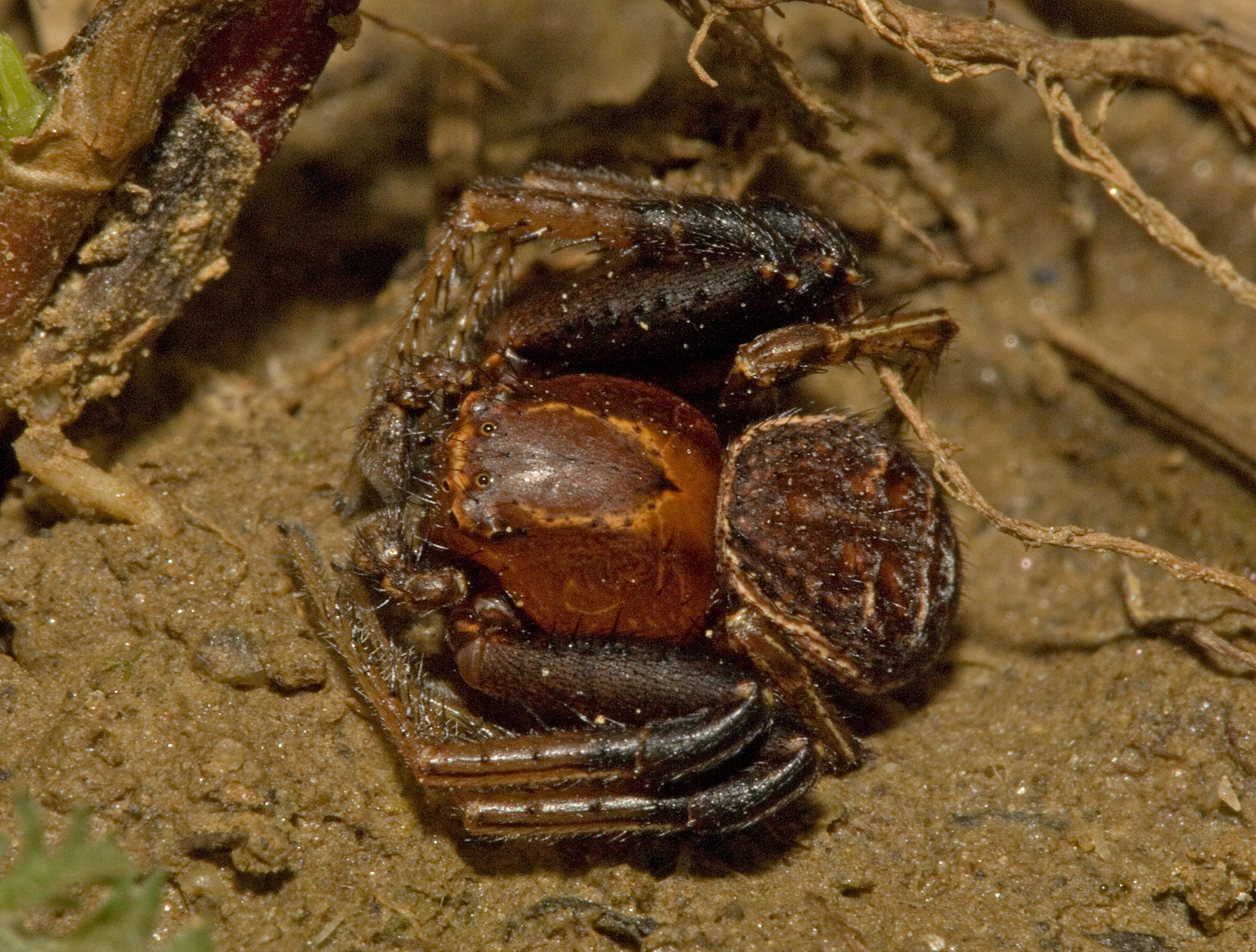
Xysticus luctator

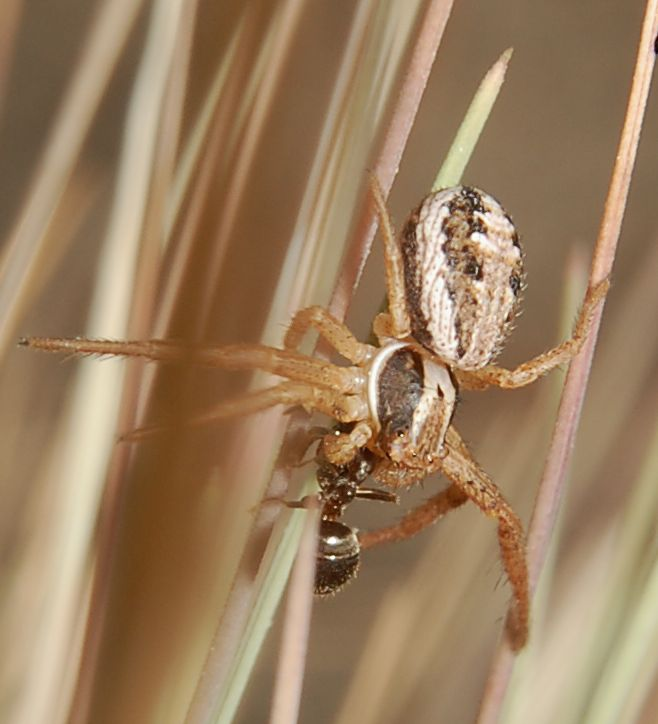
Xysticus ninniii

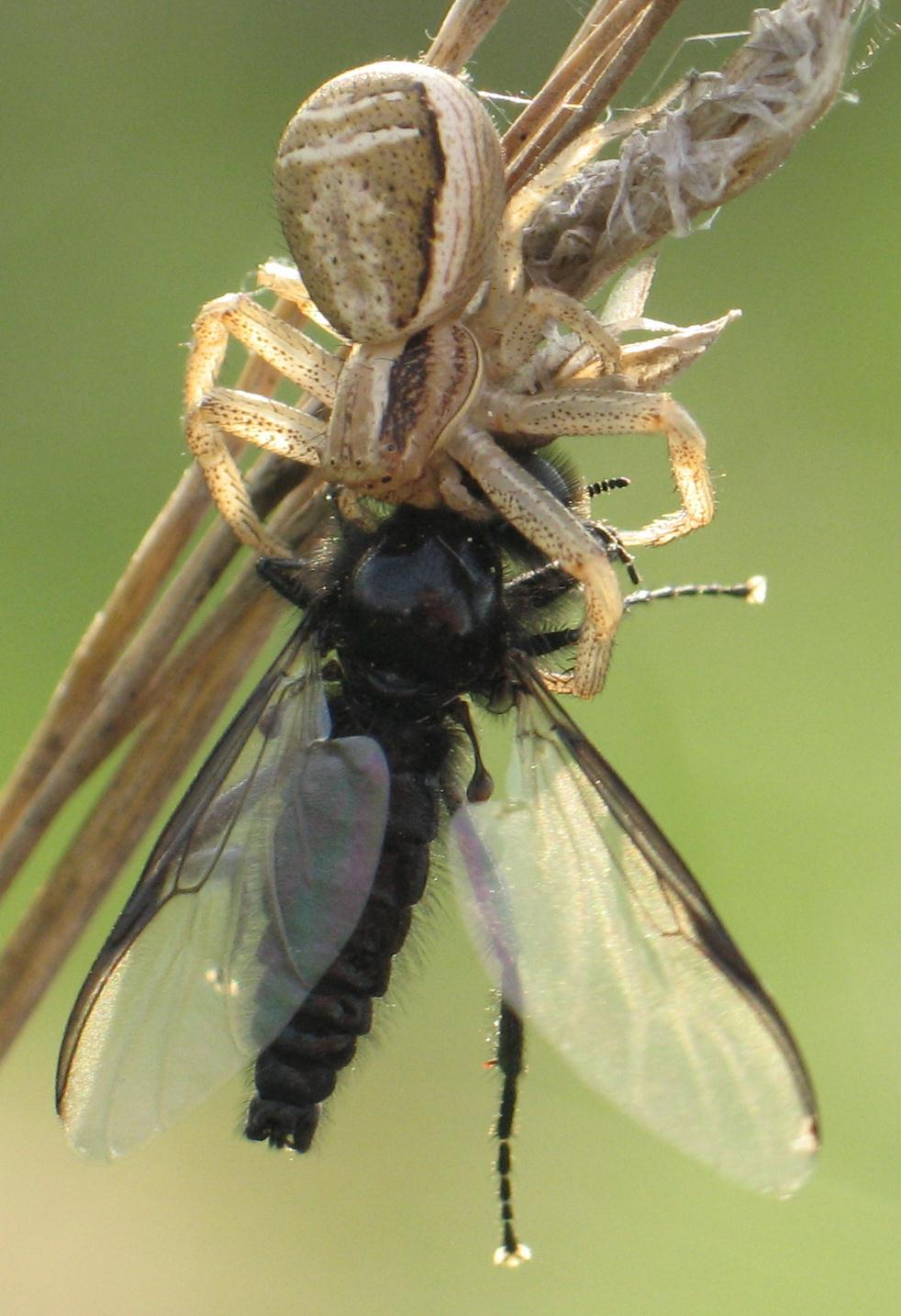
Xysticus ulmi

Complete species list as of September 2025
- Xysticus abditus Logunov, 2006 – Bulgaria, Greece, Turkey
- Xysticus acerbus Thorell, 1872 – Europe, Central Asia, Russia (Europe to Far East)
  - X. a. obscurior Kulczyński, 1895 – Moldova
- Xysticus acquiescens Emerton, 1919 – Canada, United States
- Xysticus advectus O. Pickard-Cambridge, 1890 – Guatemala, Costa Rica
- Xysticus aethiopicus L. Koch, 1875 – Ethiopia
- Xysticus albertensis Dondale, 2008 – Canada
- Xysticus albolimbatus Hu, 2001 – China
- Xysticus alboniger Turnbull, Dondale & Redner, 1965 – Canada, United States
- Xysticus aletaiensis Hu & Wu, 1989 – Kazakhstan, China
- Xysticus alpicola Kulczyński, 1882 – Poland, Slovakia, Ukraine
- Xysticus alpinus Kulczyński, 1887 – Alps (Switzerland, Italy, Germany, Austria)
- Xysticus alsus Song & Wang, 1994 – China
- Xysticus altaicus Simon, 1895 – Kazakhstan
- Xysticus altitudinis Levy, 1976 – Israel
- Xysticus ampullatus Turnbull, Dondale & Redner, 1965 – Canada, United States
- Xysticus apachecus Gertsch, 1933 – United States
- Xysticus apalacheus Gertsch, 1953 – United States
- Xysticus apertus Banks, 1898 – Mexico
- Xysticus apricus L. Koch, 1876 – Italy
- Xysticus aprilinus Bryant, 1930 – United States
- Xysticus arenarius Thorell, 1875 – Ukraine
- Xysticus arenicola Simon, 1875 – France
- Xysticus argenteus Jézéquel, 1966 – Ivory Coast
- Xysticus asper (Lucas, 1838) – Canary Islands
- Xysticus atrimaculatus Bösenberg & Strand, 1906 – China, Korea, Japan
- Xysticus auctificus Keyserling, 1880 – Canada, United States
- Xysticus audax (Schrank, 1803) – Europe, Turkey, Caucasus, Russia (Europe to Far East), Kazakhstan, Iran, China, Korea, Japan (type species)
  - X. a. massanicus Simon, 1932 – France
- Xysticus audaxoides B. S. Zhang, Y. Zhang & Song, 2004 – China
- Xysticus austrosibiricus Logunov & Marusik, 1998 – Russia (Urals to north-eastern Siberia), Kazakhstan, Mongolia, China
- Xysticus autumnalis L. Koch, 1875 – Australia (New South Wales)
- Xysticus aztecus Gertsch, 1953 – Mexico
- Xysticus bacurianensis Mcheidze, 1971 – Turkey, Caucasus (Russia, Georgia, Azerbaijan)
- Xysticus bakanas Marusik & Logunov, 1990 – Kazakhstan
- Xysticus banksi Bryant, 1933 – Canada, United States
- Xysticus barbatus Caporiacco, 1936 – Libya
- Xysticus benefactor Keyserling, 1880 – Canada, United States
- Xysticus bengalensis Tikader & Biswas, 1974 – India
- Xysticus bengdakus Saha & Raychaudhuri, 2007 – India
- Xysticus beni Strand, 1913 – DR Congo
- Xysticus berlandi Schenkel, 1963 – China
- Xysticus bermani Marusik, 1994 – Russia (middle to north-eastern Siberia), China
- Xysticus bharatae Gajbe & Gajbe, 1999 – India
- Xysticus bicolor L. Koch, 1867 – Greece
- Xysticus bicuspis Keyserling, 1887 – Canada, United States
- Xysticus bifasciatus C. L. Koch, 1837 – Europe, Turkey, Caucasus, Russia (Europe to South Siberia), Kazakhstan, Central Asia, China
- Xysticus bimaculatus L. Koch, 1867 – Australia (Queensland)
- Xysticus bohdanowiczi Zhang, Zhu & Song, 2004 – China
- Xysticus bolivari Gertsch, 1953 – Mexico
- Xysticus bradti Gertsch, 1953 – Mexico
- Xysticus breviceps O. Pickard-Cambridge, 1885 – India
- Xysticus brevidentatus Wunderlich, 1995 – Italy, Croatia, Bosnia and Herzegovina, Montenegro, Albania
- Xysticus britcheri Gertsch, 1934 – Russia (Europe to Far East), Alaska, Canada, United States
- Xysticus brunneitibiis Caporiacco, 1939 – Ethiopia
- Xysticus californicus Keyserling, 1880 – Canada, United States, Mexico
- Xysticus canadensis Gertsch, 1934 – Russia (Europe to Far East), Canada, United States
- Xysticus caspicus Utochkin, 1968 – Russia (Europe to Central Asia), Azerbaijan, Kazakhstan, Turkmenistan
- Xysticus caucasius L. Koch, 1878 – Georgia
- Xysticus chaparralis Schick, 1965 – United States
- Xysticus charitonowi Mcheidze, 1971 – Georgia
- Xysticus chippewa Gertsch, 1953 – North America, Northern Europe
- Xysticus chui Ono, 1992 – China, Taiwan
- Xysticus cochise Gertsch, 1953 – United States
- Xysticus coloradensis Bryant, 1930 – United States
- Xysticus concinnus Kroneberg, 1875 – Central Asia
- Xysticus concretus Utochkin, 1968 – Russia (Far East), China, Korea, Japan
- Xysticus concursus Gertsch, 1934 – United States
- Xysticus conflatus Song, Tang & Zhu, 1995 – China, Korea
- Xysticus connectens Kulczyński, 1901 – China
- Xysticus cor Canestrini, 1873 – Azores, Southern Europe, Turkey, Iran
- Xysticus corsicus Simon, 1875 – France (Corsica)
- Xysticus crispabilis Song & Gao, 1996 – China
- Xysticus cristatus (Clerck, 1757) – Europe, Turkey, Caucasus, Russia (Europe to South Siberia), Kazakhstan, Iran, Central Asia, Nepal, China, Korea, Japan. Introduced to Canada, United States
- Xysticus croceus Fox, 1937 – India, Nepal, Bhutan, China, Taiwan, Korea, Japan, Vietnam
- Xysticus cunctator Thorell, 1877 – Canada, United States
- Xysticus curtus Banks, 1898 – Mexico
- Xysticus dali Li & Yang, 2008 – China
- Xysticus davidi Schenkel, 1963 – Russia (Far East), China
- Xysticus denisi Schenkel, 1963 – China
- Xysticus desidiosus Simon, 1875 – Europe
- Xysticus discursans Keyserling, 1880 – North America
- Xysticus diversus (Blackwall, 1870) – Italy (Sicily)
- Xysticus doriai (Dalmas, 1922) – Italy
- Xysticus dzhungaricus Tystshenko, 1965 – Kazakhstan, Russia (Central Asia to Far East), Central Asia, China
- Xysticus edax (O. Pickard-Cambridge, 1872) – Turkey, Azerbaijan, Israel, Iraq, Iran
- Xysticus elegans Keyserling, 1880 – Canada, United States
- Xysticus elephantus Ono, 1978 – Nepal, China
- Xysticus ellipticus Turnbull, Dondale & Redner, 1965 – Canada, United States
- Xysticus emertoni Keyserling, 1880 – Russia (Urals to Far East), Kazakhstan, Central Asia, China, Alaska, Canada, United States
- Xysticus ephippiatus Simon, 1880 – Kazakhstan, Russia (Central Asia to Far East), Central Asia, Mongolia, China, Korea, Japan
- Xysticus erraticus (Blackwall, 1834) – Europe, Turkey, Caucasus (Russia)
- Xysticus facetus O. Pickard-Cambridge, 1896 – Mexico, El Salvador
- Xysticus fagei Lessert, 1919 – Tanzania, Zimbabwe, South Africa
- Xysticus federalis Gertsch, 1953 – Mexico
- Xysticus ferox (Hentz, 1847) – Alaska, Canada, United States
- Xysticus ferrugineus Menge, 1876 – Europe, Turkey, China
- Xysticus ferruginoides Schenkel, 1963 – Russia (South Siberia, Far East), Mongolia
- Xysticus fervidus Gertsch, 1953 – Canada, United States
- Xysticus flavitarsis Simon, 1878 – DR Congo
- Xysticus flavovittatus Keyserling, 1880 – United States
- Xysticus floridanus Banks, 1896 – United States
- Xysticus fraternus Banks, 1895 – Canada, United States
- Xysticus funestus Keyserling, 1880 – North America
- Xysticus furtivus Gertsch, 1936 – United States
- Xysticus gallicus Simon, 1875 – Europe, Turkey, Caucasus, Iran
  - X. g. batumiensis Mcheidze & Utochkin, 1971 – Georgia
- Xysticus gattefossei Denis, 1956 – Morocco
- Xysticus geometres L. Koch, 1874 – Australia (Queensland)
- Xysticus gertschi Schick, 1965 – North America
- Xysticus gortanii Caporiacco, 1922 – Italy
- Xysticus gosiutus Gertsch, 1933 – Canada, United States
- Xysticus gracilis Keyserling, 1880 – Colombia
- Xysticus grallator Simon, 1932 – Portugal, Spain, France (Corsica), Italy
- Xysticus guizhou Song & Zhu, 1997 – China
- Xysticus gulosus Keyserling, 1880 – North America
- Xysticus havilandi Lawrence, 1942 – South Africa
- Xysticus hedini Schenkel, 1936 – Russia (South Siberia, Far East), Mongolia, China, Korea, Japan
- Xysticus helophilus Simon, 1890 – Yemen
- Xysticus hepaticus Simon, 1903 – Madagascar
- Xysticus himalayaensis Tikader & Biswas, 1974 – India
- Xysticus hui Platnick, 1993 – China
- Xysticus humilis Redner & Dondale, 1966 – United States
- Xysticus ibex Simon, 1875 – Spain, France, Italy
  - X. i. dalmasi Simon, 1932 – France
- Xysticus ictericus L. Koch, 1874 – Fiji
- Xysticus idolothytus Logunov, 1995 – Kazakhstan, Mongolia, China
- Xysticus illaudatus Logunov, 1995 – Russia (Far East)
- Xysticus imitarius Gertsch, 1953 – United States
- Xysticus indiligens (Walckenaer, 1837) – United States
- Xysticus insulicola Bösenberg & Strand, 1906 – Russia (Far East), China, Korea, Japan
- Xysticus iviei Schick, 1965 – United States
  - X. i. sierrensis Schick, 1965 – United States
- Xysticus jabalpurensis Gajbe & Gajbe, 1999 – India
- Xysticus japenus Roewer, 1938 – Indonesia (Western New Guinea)
- Xysticus jiangi Peng, Yin & Kim, 2000 – China
- Xysticus jinlin Song & Zhu, 1995 – China
- Xysticus joyantius Tikader, 1966 – India
- Xysticus jugalis L. Koch, 1875 – Ethiopia
  - X. j. larvatus Caporiacco, 1949 – Kenya
- Xysticus kalandadzei Mcheidze & Utochkin, 1971 – Georgia
- Xysticus kali Tikader & Biswas, 1974 – India
- Xysticus kamakhyai Tikader, 1962 – India
- Xysticus kansuensis Tang, Song & Zhu, 1995 – China, Japan
- Xysticus kashidi Tikader, 1963 – India
- Xysticus kaznakovi Utochkin, 1968 – North Macedonia, Bulgaria, Greece, Turkey, Caucasus (Russia, Azerbaijan), Iran, Turkmenistan, Tajikistan
- Xysticus kempeleni Thorell, 1872 – Europe, Central Asia
  - X. k. nigriceps Simon, 1932 – France
- Xysticus khasiensis Tikader, 1980 – India
- Xysticus kochi Thorell, 1872 – Europe, Mediterranean, Central Asia
  - X. k. abchasicus Mcheidze & Utochkin, 1971 – Georgia
- Xysticus kulczynskii Werjbitzky, 1902 – Georgia, Armenia, Azerbaijan, Iran
- Xysticus kurilensis Strand, 1907 – Russia (Sakhalin, Kurile Is.), China, Korea, Japan
- Xysticus kuzgi Marusik & Logunov, 1990 – Central Asia
- Xysticus laetus Thorell, 1875 – Italy, Caucasus, Iran
- Xysticus lanio C. L. Koch, 1835 – Europe, Turkey, Caucasus, Russia (Europe to Middle and South Siberia), Turkmenistan
- Xysticus lapidarius Utochkin, 1968 – Central Asia
- Xysticus lassanus Chamberlin, 1925 – United States, Mexico
- Xysticus latitabundus Logunov, 1995 – Russia (Far East)
- Xysticus lepnevae Utochkin, 1968 – Russia (Far East, Sakhalin), Korea, China
- Xysticus lesserti Schenkel, 1963 – China
- Xysticus lineatus (Westring, 1851) – Europe, Caucasus, Russia (Europe to Central Asia), Kazakhstan, China
- Xysticus locuples Keyserling, 1880 – North America
- Xysticus logunovi Seyfulina & Mikhailov, 2004 – Russia (Far East)
- Xysticus logunovorum Blick & Ono, 2021 – Iran
- Xysticus lucifugus Lawrence, 1937 – South Africa
- Xysticus luctans (C. L. Koch, 1845) – Canada, United States
- Xysticus luctator L. Koch, 1870 – Europe, Caucasus, Russia (Europe to South Siberia), Kazakhstan
- Xysticus luctuosus (Blackwall, 1836) – North America, Europe, Turkey, Caucasus, Russia (Europe to Far East), Kazakhstan, Iran, Central Asia
- Xysticus lutzi Gertsch, 1935 – United States, Mexico
- Xysticus macedonicus Šilhavý, 1944 – Germany, Switzerland, Austria, Italy, Kosovo, Albania, North Macedonia, Greece, Turkey
- Xysticus maculatipes Roewer, 1962 – Afghanistan
- Xysticus maculiger Roewer, 1951 – Pakistan
- Xysticus manas Song & Zhu, 1995 – China
- Xysticus martensi Ono, 1978 – Nepal
- Xysticus marusiki Ono & Martens, 2005 – Turkey, Iran
- Xysticus metinaktasi Demir, Seyyar & Türker, 2017 – Turkey
- Xysticus mongolicus Schenkel, 1963 – Russia (Central Asia, South Siberia), Kazakhstan, Mongolia, China
- Xysticus montanensis Keyserling, 1887 – Alaska, Canada, United States
- Xysticus mulleri Lawrence, 1952 – South Africa, Lesotho, Eswatini
- Xysticus multiaculeatus Caporiacco, 1940 – Ethiopia
- Xysticus mundulus O. Pickard-Cambridge, 1885 – India
- Xysticus namaquensis Simon, 1910 – South Africa
- Xysticus natalensis Lawrence, 1938 – Zimbabwe, Mozambique, South Africa, Lesotho, Eswatini
- Xysticus nataliae Utochkin, 1968 – Russia (South Siberia)
- Xysticus nigriceps Berland, 1922 – East Africa
- Xysticus nigropunctatus L. Koch, 1867 – Australia (Queensland)
- Xysticus nigrotrivittatus (Simon, 1870) – Portugal, Spain
- Xysticus nitidus Hu, 2001 – China
- Xysticus nubilus Simon, 1875 – Macaronesia, Mediterranean, Georgia
- Xysticus nyingchiensis Song & Zhu, 1995 – China
- Xysticus obscurus Collett, 1877 – North America, Europe, Russia (Europe to Far East)
- Xysticus ocala Gertsch, 1953 – United States
- Xysticus orizaba Banks, 1898 – Mexico
- Xysticus ovatus Simon, 1876 – France
- Xysticus paiutus Gertsch, 1933 – United States, Mexico
- Xysticus palawanicus Barrion & Litsinger, 1995 – Philippines
- Xysticus palpimirabilis Marusik & Chevrizov, 1990 – Kyrgyzstan
- Xysticus parapunctatus Song & Zhu, 1995 – China
- Xysticus pearcei Schick, 1965 – United States, Mexico
- Xysticus peccans O. Pickard-Cambridge, 1876 – Egypt
- Xysticus pellax O. Pickard-Cambridge, 1894 – North America
- Xysticus peltiformus Zhang, Zhu & Song, 2004 – China
- Xysticus peninsulanus Gertsch, 1934 – United States
- Xysticus periscelis Simon, 1908 – Australia (Western Australia)
- Xysticus pieperi Ono & Martens, 2005 – Iran
- Xysticus pigrides Mello-Leitão, 1929 – Cape Verde
- Xysticus pingshan Zhang, Zhu & Song, 2004 – China
- Xysticus posti Sauer, 1968 – United States
- Xysticus pretiosus Gertsch, 1934 – Alaska, Canada, United States
- Xysticus promiscuus O. Pickard-Cambridge, 1876 – Italy (Sicily), Egypt, Israel
- Xysticus pseudobliteus (Simon, 1880) – Russia (Central Asia to Far East), Kazakhstan, Mongolia, China, Korea
- Xysticus pseudocristatus Azarkina & Logunov, 2001 – Russia (West and South Siberia, Central Asia), Kazakhstan, Central Asia, Pakistan, China
- Xysticus pseudolanio Wunderlich, 1995 – Bulgaria, Turkey, Georgia
- Xysticus pseudoluctuosus Marusik & Logunov, 1995 – Turkey, Cyprus, Tajikistan
- Xysticus pulcherrimus Keyserling, 1880 – Colombia
- Xysticus punctatus Keyserling, 1880 – Canada, United States
- Xysticus pygmaeus Tystshenko, 1965 – Kazakhstan
- Xysticus pynurus Tikader, 1968 – India
- Xysticus quadrispinus Caporiacco, 1933 – Libya
  - X. q. concolor Caporiacco, 1933 – Libya
- Xysticus quagga Jocqué, 1977 – Morocco
- Xysticus rainbowi Strand, 1901 – Papua New Guinea
- Xysticus robinsoni Gertsch, 1953 – United States, Mexico
- Xysticus rockefelleri Gertsch, 1953 – Mexico
- Xysticus roonwali Tikader, 1964 – India, Nepal
- Xysticus rostratus Ono, 1988 – Russia (Far East), Japan
- Xysticus ryukyuensis Ono, 2002 – Japan
- Xysticus saganus Bösenberg & Strand, 1906 – Russia (Far East), China, Korea, Japan
- Xysticus sagittifer Lawrence, 1927 – Namibia, South Africa
- Xysticus sansan Levy, 2007 – Israel
- Xysticus schoutedeni Lessert, 1943 – Congo
- Xysticus semicarinatus Simon, 1932 – Portugal, Spain, France
- Xysticus sharlaa Marusik & Logunov, 2002 – Russia (South Siberia), China
- Xysticus shillongensis Tikader, 1962 – India
- Xysticus shyamrupus Tikader, 1966 – India
- Xysticus siciliensis Wunderlich, 1995 – Italy
- Xysticus sicus Fox, 1937 – Russia (Far East), China, Korea
- Xysticus sikkimus Tikader, 1970 – India, China
- Xysticus silvestrii Simon, 1905 – Argentina
- Xysticus simonstownensis Strand, 1909 – South Africa
- Xysticus sjostedti Schenkel, 1936 – Russia (Europe to north-eastern Siberia), Kazakhstan, Mongolia, China
- Xysticus slovacus Svatoň, Pekár & Prídavka, 2000 – Slovakia, Ukraine, Russia (Urals)
- Xysticus soderbomi Schenkel, 1936 – Mongolia, China
- Xysticus soldatovi Utochkin, 1968 – Russia (Far East), China
- Xysticus spasskyi Utochkin, 1968 – Ukraine, Caucasus
- Xysticus sphericus (Walckenaer, 1837) – United States
- Xysticus spiethi Gertsch, 1953 – Mexico
- Xysticus subjugalis Strand, 1906 – Ethiopia
  - X. s. nigerrimus Caporiacco, 1941 – Ethiopia
- Xysticus tampa Gertsch, 1953 – United States
- Xysticus tarcos L. Koch, 1875 – Ethiopia
- Xysticus taukumkurt Marusik & Logunov, 1990 – Kazakhstan
- Xysticus tenuiapicalis Demir, 2012 – Turkey
- Xysticus texanus Banks, 1904 – United States, Mexico
- Xysticus thessalicoides Wunderlich, 1995 – Greece (incl. Crete), Turkey
- Xysticus thessalicus Simon, 1916 – Croatia, Albania, Bulgaria, Greece, Turkey, Israel
- Xysticus tikaderi Bhandari & Gajbe, 2001 – India
- Xysticus toltecus Gertsch, 1953 – Mexico
- Xysticus torsivoides Song & Zhu, 1995 – China
- Xysticus tortuosus Simon, 1932 – Portugal, Austria, Morocco, Algeria
- Xysticus transversomaculatus Bösenberg & Strand, 1906 – Korea, Japan
- Xysticus triguttatus Keyserling, 1880 – Canada, United States
- Xysticus trizonatus Ono, 1988 – Japan
- Xysticus tsanghoensis Hu, 2001 – China
- Xysticus tugelanus Lawrence, 1942 – South Africa, Lesotho
- Xysticus turkmenicus Marusik & Logunov, 1995 – Iran, Kazakhstan, Central Asia
- Xysticus ukrainicus Utochkin, 1968 – Russia (Europe), Georgia
- Xysticus ulmi (Hahn, 1831) – Europe, Turkey, Caucasus, Russia (Europe to Middle and South Siberia), Central Asia, China
- Xysticus urbensis Lawrence, 1952 – South Africa, Lesotho
- Xysticus urgumchak Marusik & Logunov, 1990 – Kazakhstan, Turkmenistan
- Xysticus utochkini Esyunin & Efimik, 2025 – Kazakhstan
- Xysticus variabilis Keyserling, 1880 – United States
- Xysticus verecundus Gertsch, 1934 – Mexico
- Xysticus verneaui Simon, 1883 – Canary Islands, Madeira
- Xysticus viduus Kulczyński, 1898 – Europe, Turkey, Caucasus, Russia (Europe to Middle Siberia), Kazakhstan
- Xysticus viveki Gajbe, 2005 – India
- Xysticus wagneri Gertsch, 1953 – Mexico
- Xysticus walesianus Karsch, 1878 – Australia (New South Wales)
- Xysticus winnipegensis Turnbull, Dondale & Redner, 1965 – Canada
- Xysticus wunderlichi Logunov, Marusik & Trilikauskas, 2001 – Russia (South Siberia), China
- Xysticus xerodermus Strand, 1913 – Turkey, Israel, Iran
- Xysticus xiningensis Hu, 2001 – China
- Xysticus yebongensis Lee & Kim, 2018 – Korea
- Xysticus yogeshi Gajbe, 2005 – India
