= Xysticus discursans =

Scientific classification
- Kingdom: Animalia
- Phylum: Arthropoda
- Subphylum: Chelicerata
- Class: Arachnida
- Order: Araneae
- Infraorder: Araneomorphae
- Family: Thomisidae
- Genus: Xysticus
- Species: X. discursans

Binomial name
- Xysticus discursans Keyserling, 1880

Species of spider

Xysticus discursans is a species of crab spider in the family Thomisidae. It is found in North America.

== Taxonomic history ==
Xysticus discursans was first described by the German arachnologist Eugen von Keyserling in 1880. His original description included illustrations of the species. In 1930, the American arachnologist Elizabeth B. Bryant described a spider under the name Xysticus vernalis, which was subsequently recognised as belonging to X. discursans by Willis J. Gertsch in 1934. As a result, Xysticus vernalis is now treated as a junior synonym of Xysticus discursans.

The species was examined in several subsequent taxonomic studies, including works by Gertsch in 1939, Arthur M. Chickering in 1940 and Benjamin J. Kaston in 1948. These publications provided additional illustrations and descriptions of male and female specimens.
