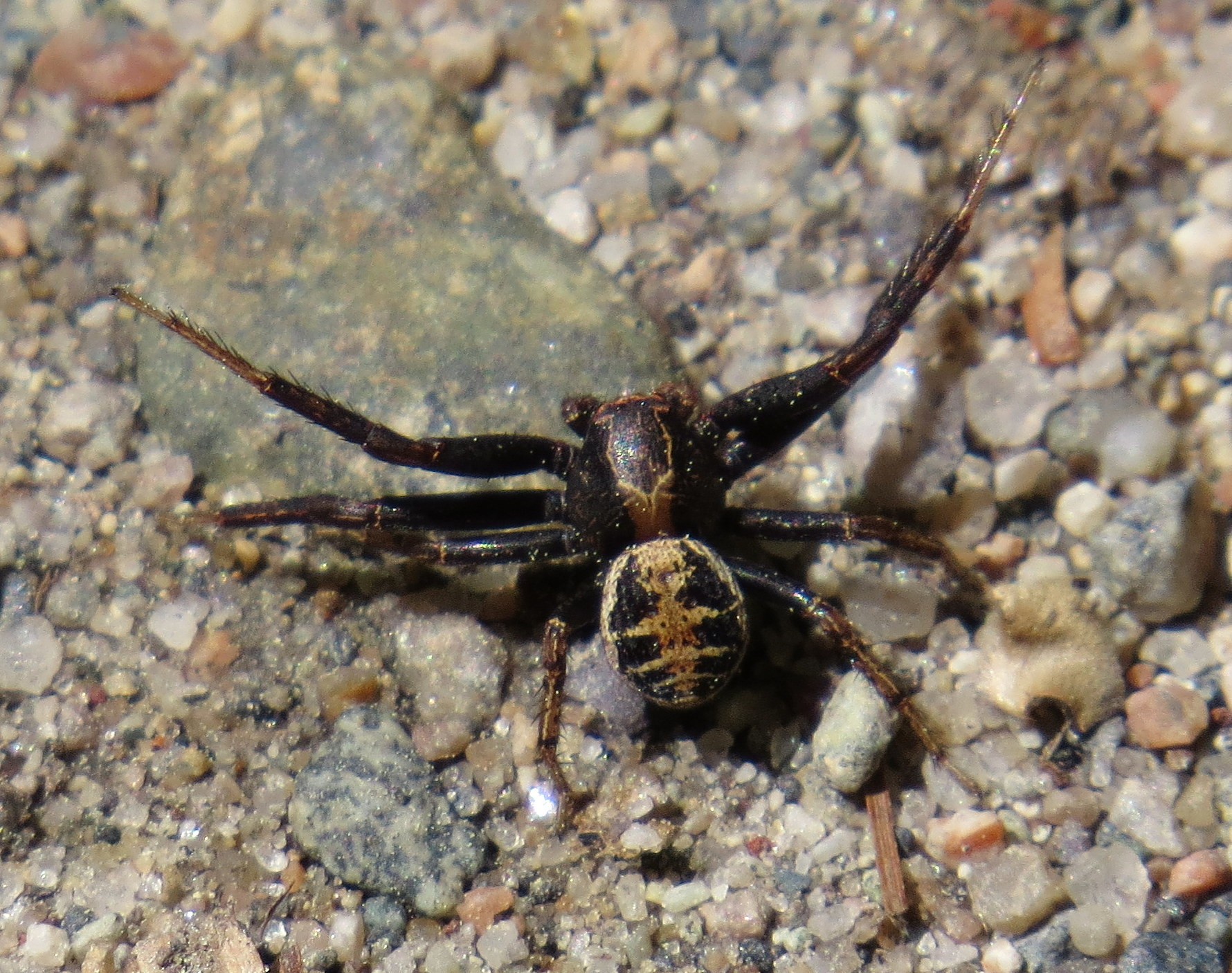
- Male

Scientific classification
- Kingdom: Animalia
- Phylum: Arthropoda
- Subphylum: Chelicerata
- Class: Arachnida
- Order: Araneae
- Infraorder: Araneomorphae
- Family: Thomisidae
- Genus: Xysticus
- Species: X. elegans

Binomial name
- Xysticus elegans Keyserling, 1880

Synonyms
- Xysticus borealis (Keyserling, 1884); Xysticus limbatus (Emerton, 1892)

= Xysticus elegans =

Species of spider

Xysticus elegans, the elegant crab spider, is a species of spiders found in the United States, Canada, and Alaska.

== Appearance ==
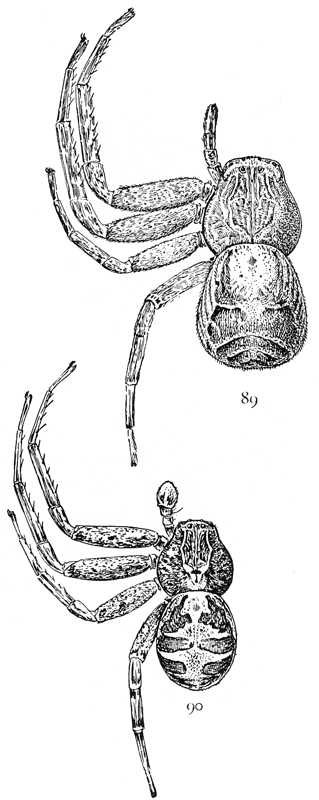
Illustration of female (top) and male (bottom)

Xysticus elegans is a medium-sized crab spider. Its body length is described as about 8-12 mm and 4-5 mm for females and males respectively. X. elegans is described as showing strong sexual dimorphism in size; Males in this species tend to be less than half the size of females. X. elegans has a brown cephalothorax that has a lighter area, sometimes this lighter area is outlined in white. It has a light tan band through the eye region and an abdomen that has brown spots outlined in white. It has brown legs.

The femora and patellae of females of this species tend to be paler than those of males, who tend to have femora and patellae that are nearly black.
