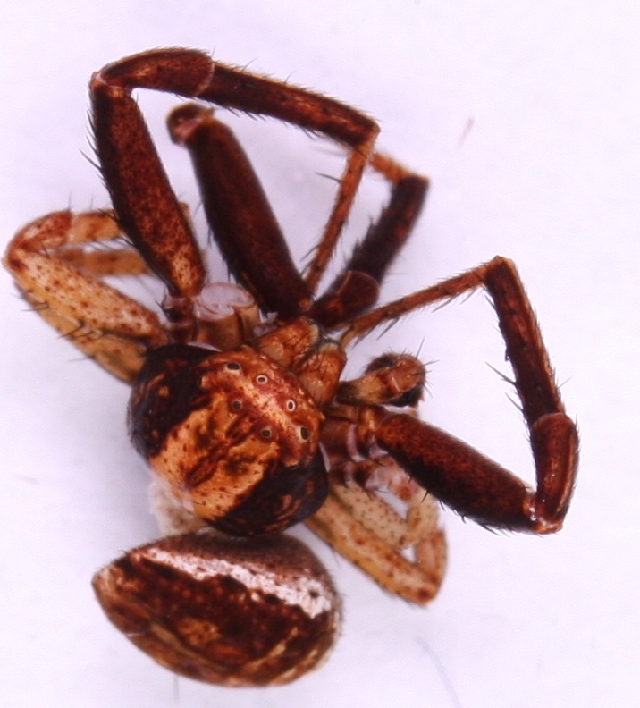

Scientific classification
- Kingdom: Animalia
- Phylum: Arthropoda
- Subphylum: Chelicerata
- Class: Arachnida
- Order: Araneae
- Infraorder: Araneomorphae
- Family: Thomisidae
- Genus: Xysticus
- Species: X. obscurus

Binomial name
- Xysticus obscurus Collett, 1877

= Xysticus obscurus =

Species of spider

Xysticus obscurus is a species of crab spider in the family Thomisidae. It is found in North America, Europe, and a range from Russia (European to Siberia).
