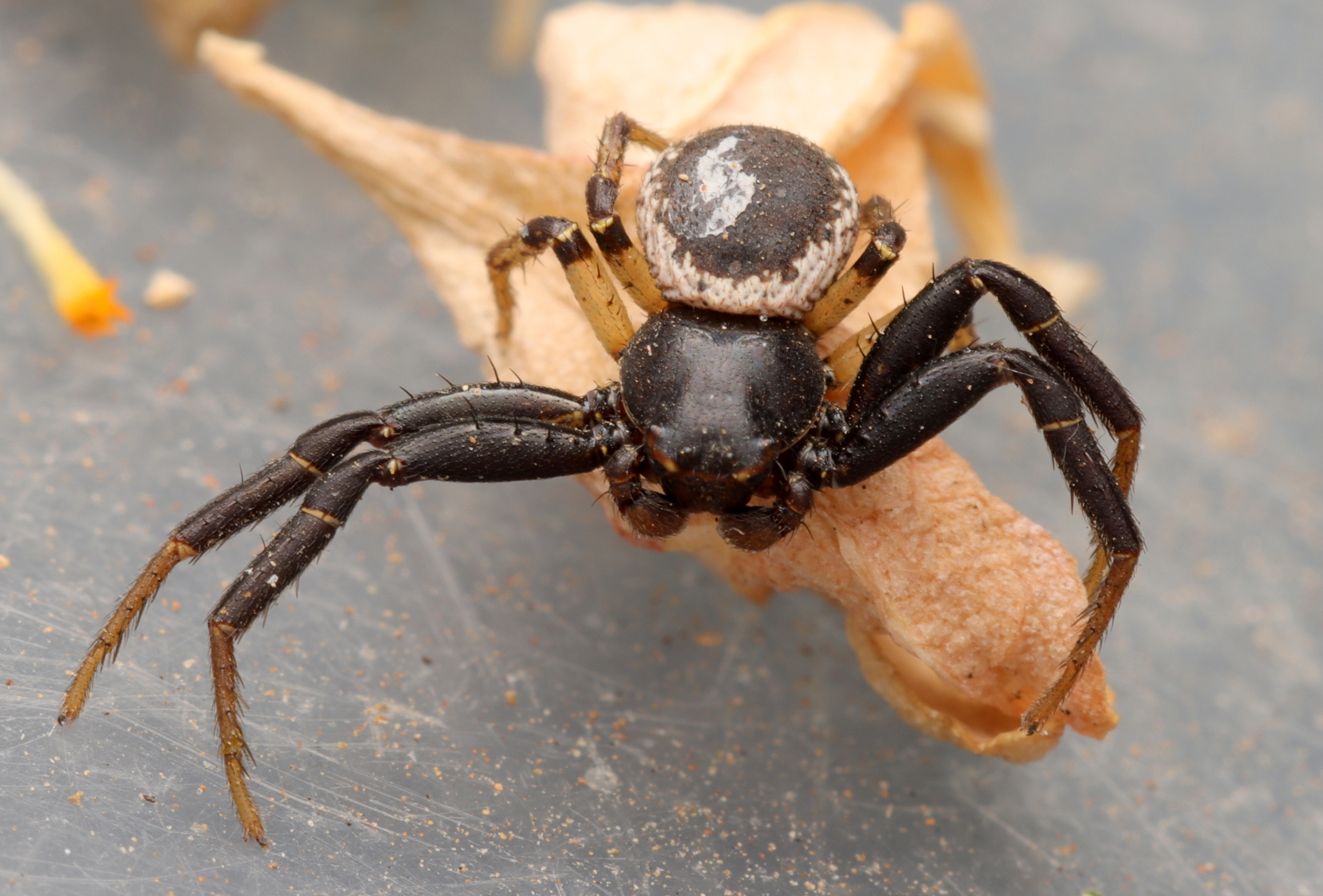
- male
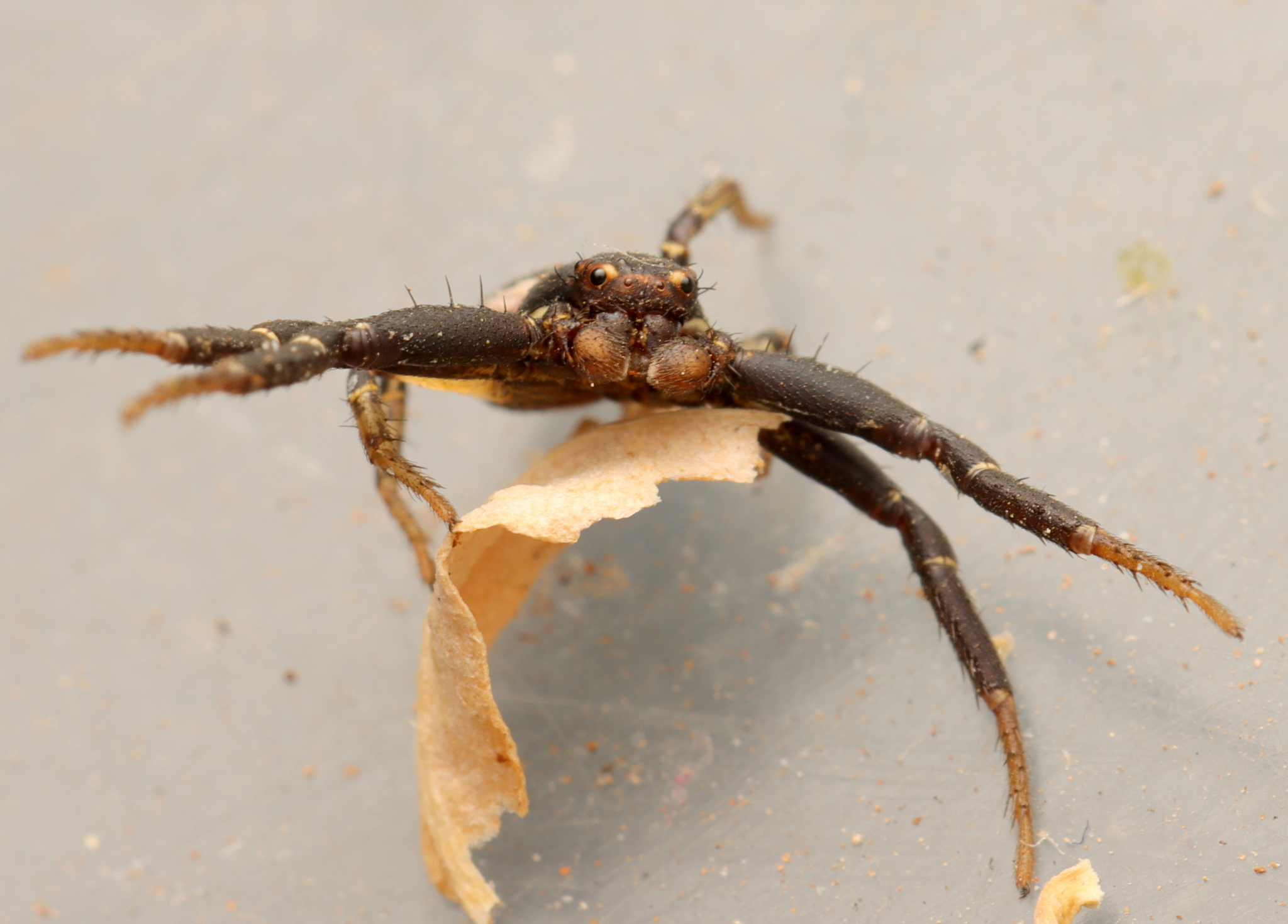
- male

Scientific classification
- Kingdom: Animalia
- Phylum: Arthropoda
- Subphylum: Chelicerata
- Class: Arachnida
- Order: Araneae
- Infraorder: Araneomorphae
- Family: Thomisidae
- Genus: Xysticus
- Species: X. sagittifer

Binomial name
- Xysticus sagittifer Lawrence, 1927

= Xysticus sagittifer =

Namibian Xysticus Ground Crab Spider

Species of spider

Xysticus sagittifer is a species of spider in the family Thomisidae. It occurs in Namibia and South Africa, and is commonly known as the Namibian Xysticus ground crab spider.

== Distribution ==
Xysticus sagittifer occurs in two southern African countries: Namibia and South Africa. In South Africa, the species is known only from the Western Cape province, where it occurs at altitudes ranging from 285 to 459 m above sea level.

South African locations include Cederberg Wilderness Area (Sawadee), and Simonsberg Conservancy (Delheim Edge and Delvera Edge).

== Habitat and ecology ==
Xysticus sagittifer are ground dwellers that inhabit the Fynbos biome. The species has also been found in vineyards.

== Conservation ==
Xysticus sagittifer is listed as Least Concern by the South African National Biodiversity Institute due to its wide range in southern Africa. The species is protected in the Cederberg Wilderness Area. No conservation actions are recommended.

== Taxonomy ==
The species was originally described by Reginald Frederick Lawrence in 1927 from Namibia. African species of Xysticus have not been revised, and the species is known from both sexes.
