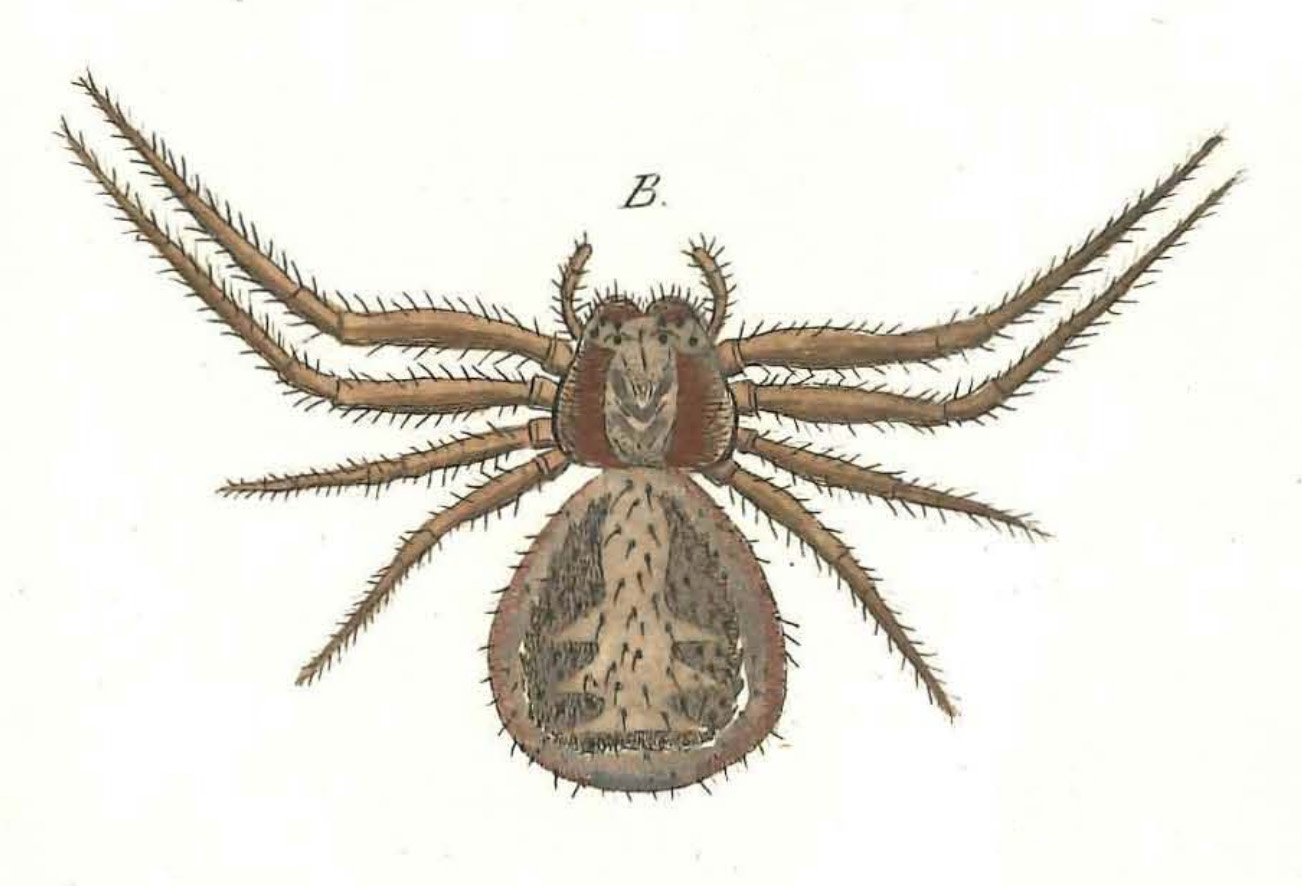
- female
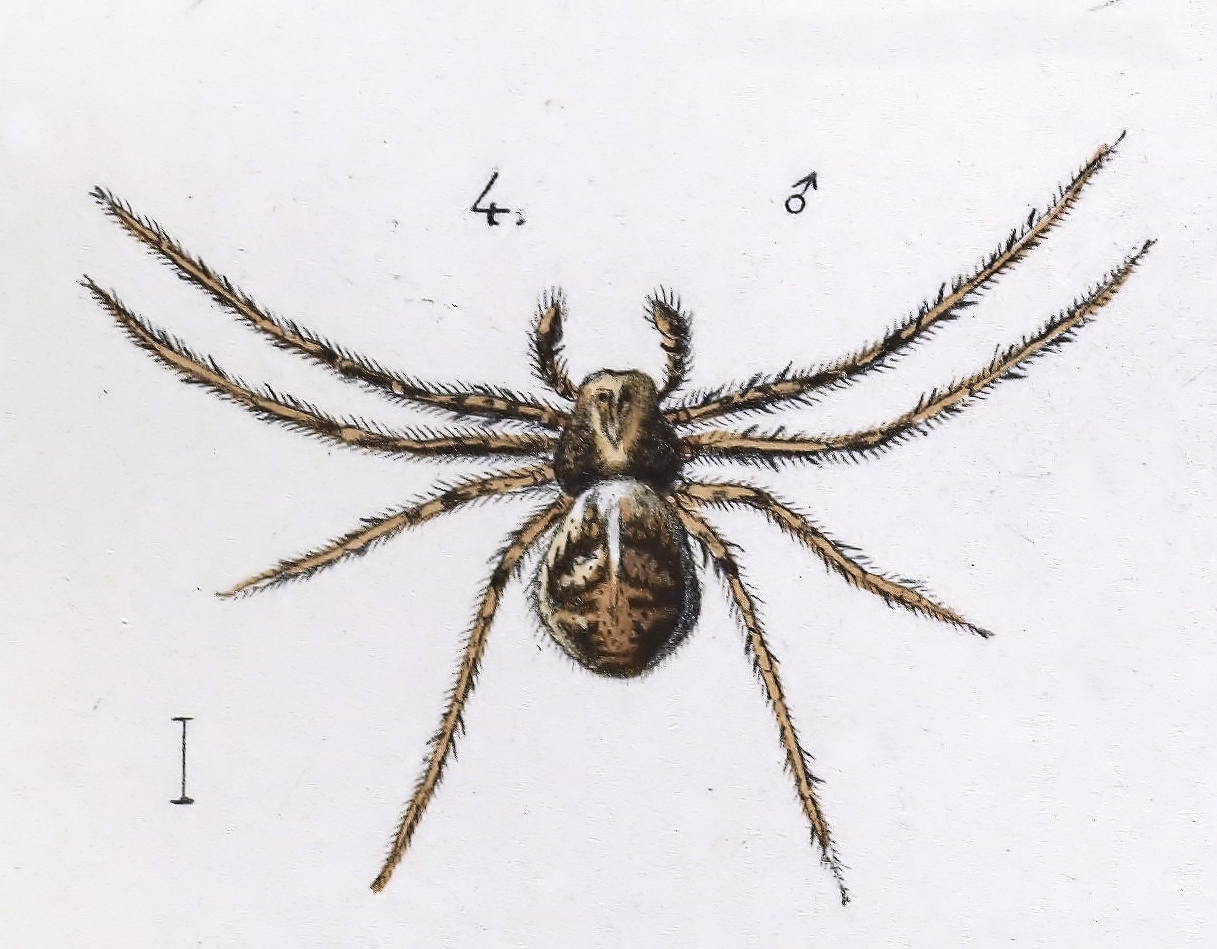
- male

Scientific classification
- Kingdom: Animalia
- Phylum: Arthropoda
- Subphylum: Chelicerata
- Class: Arachnida
- Order: Araneae
- Infraorder: Araneomorphae
- Family: Thomisidae
- Genus: Xysticus
- Species: X. audax

Binomial name
- Xysticus audax (Schrank, 1803)

Synonyms
- Aranea audax Schrank, 1803; Thomisus pini Hahn, 1831; Thomisus lateralis Hahn, 1831; Xysticus mordax C. L. Koch, 1835; Xysticus cinereus C. L. Koch, 1837; Xysticus pini (Hahn, 1831)

= Xysticus audax =

Species of spider

Xysticus audax is a species of crab spider in the family Thomisidae. It has a wide distribution across the Palearctic region, ranging from Iceland in the west through the temperate regions of Eurasia to Sakhalin and Japan in the east.

== Etymology ==
The specific name audax is derived from the Latin word meaning "bold" or "daring" (German: verwegen), referring to the spider's behavior as observed by the original describer.

== Description ==
Xysticus audax exhibits considerable variation in coloration and pattern, making identification challenging, particularly for females.

=== Female ===
As with crab spiders in general, females are larger than males, with a total length of 4.3–6.4 mm and cephalothorax length of 1.88–2.93 mm. Two main color varieties have been documented: a dark variety and a light variety. The dark variety has sides of the cephalothorax that are dark brown with yellowish dots and spots, while the light variety shows pale brown coloration with darker patches.

The epigyne is highly variable and features an atrium divided by a broad septum that is usually broader than in X. cristatus. The anterior borders each bear a low but distinct tooth, and the copulatory ducts vary considerably in length.

=== Male ===
Males have a total length of 3.8–5.0 mm, with the cephalothorax measuring 1.97–2.91 mm in length and 1.88–2.59 mm in width. The cephalothorax is brown to dark brown with a median band that is brownish anteriorly and becomes yellowish-white posteriorly. The chelicerae are dark greyish-brown with a yellowish-white diagonal band, while the sternum is yellowish-white with black dots.

The legs show a distinctive pattern with distal segments mostly pale yellowish-brown and proximal segments dark brown with yellow-white dots and patches. The opisthosoma is dark brown with a whitish, distinctly dentated median band and dull yellowish-white margins.

Males can be distinguished from the closely related Xysticus cristatus by specific characteristics of the pedipalp. The median apophysis has a pickaxe shape with short shaft ends that are nearly equal in length, and the longest tooth of the basal tegular apophysis is distinctive.

== Distribution ==
X. audax is a trans-Eurasian temperate species with a broad distribution across the Palearctic region. It ranges from Iceland in the west through the temperate belt of Eurasia to Sakhalin and Japan (Hokkaido and Honshu) in the east. The species has been recorded from numerous countries including Russia, Kazakhstan, Iran, China, Korea, and most European countries.

Some records from Crete, Turkey, and Iran may require confirmation and could potentially represent misidentifications of related species.

== Habitat ==
The species inhabits a variety of open and semi-open habitats including meadows, groves, heathlands with Calluna, and dry pine forests. It has been collected from various vegetation types including steppe slopes, mixed forests, and tundra environments.

== Biology ==
Adult males are active from the beginning of May to mid-July, while adult females can be found throughout the year.

== Taxonomy ==
Xysticus audax belongs to the cristatus species group and is most closely related to Xysticus cristatus and Xysticus pseudocristatus. The females of X. audax and X. cristatus are nearly indistinguishable, making male specimens essential for reliable species identification.

The species has a complex taxonomic history with numerous synonyms, reflecting the difficulty in distinguishing it from related species. The name Xysticus pini was commonly used for this species in older literature before the current nomenclature was established.
