= Xysticus pellax =

Scientific classification
- Kingdom: Animalia
- Phylum: Arthropoda
- Subphylum: Chelicerata
- Class: Arachnida
- Order: Araneae
- Infraorder: Araneomorphae
- Family: Thomisidae
- Genus: Xysticus
- Species: X. pellax

Binomial name
- Xysticus pellax O. P.-Cambridge, 1894

Species of spider

Xysticus pellax is a species of crab spider in the family Thomisidae. It is found in North America.
