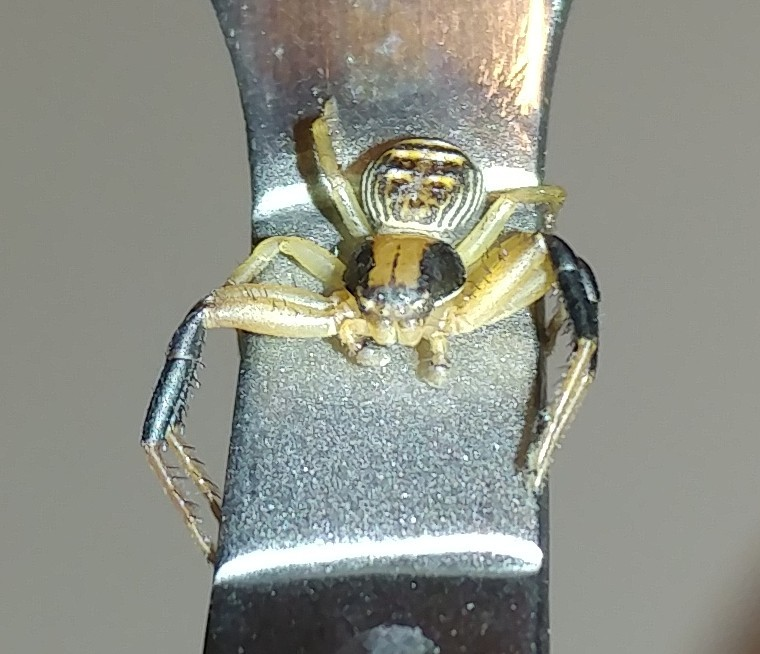

Scientific classification
- Kingdom: Animalia
- Phylum: Arthropoda
- Subphylum: Chelicerata
- Class: Arachnida
- Order: Araneae
- Infraorder: Araneomorphae
- Family: Thomisidae
- Genus: Xysticus
- Species: X. texanus

Binomial name
- Xysticus texanus Banks, 1904

= Xysticus texanus =

Species of spider

Xysticus texanus is a species of crab spider in the family Thomisidae. It is found in the United States and Mexico.
