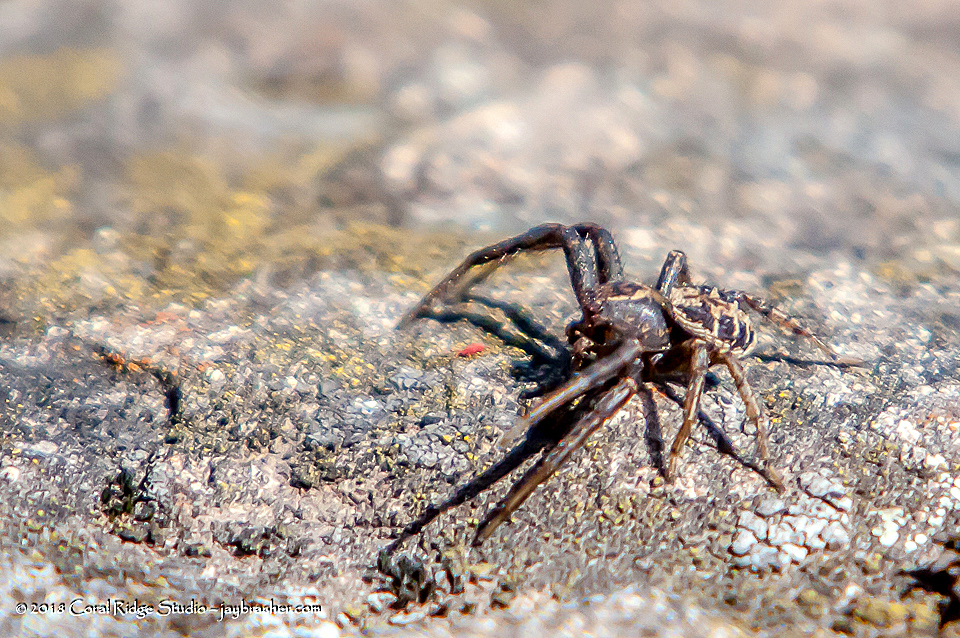

Scientific classification
- Kingdom: Animalia
- Phylum: Arthropoda
- Subphylum: Chelicerata
- Class: Arachnida
- Order: Araneae
- Infraorder: Araneomorphae
- Family: Thomisidae
- Genus: Xysticus
- Species: X. emertoni

Binomial name
- Xysticus emertoni Keyserling, 1880

= Xysticus emertoni =

Species of spider

Xysticus emertoni, or Emerton's crab spider, is a species of crab spider in the family Thomisidae. It is found in the United States, Canada, Slovakia, Russia, and a range from Central Asia to China.
