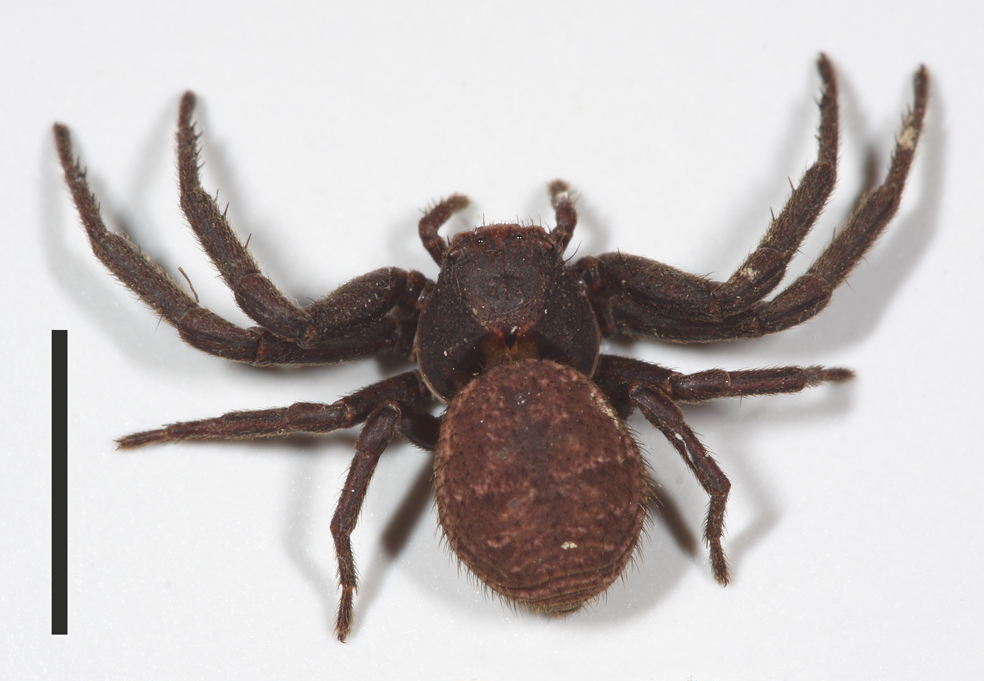

Scientific classification
- Kingdom: Animalia
- Phylum: Arthropoda
- Subphylum: Chelicerata
- Class: Arachnida
- Order: Araneae
- Infraorder: Araneomorphae
- Family: Thomisidae
- Genus: Xysticus
- Species: X. luctuosus

Binomial name
- Xysticus luctuosus (Blackwall, 1836)

= Xysticus luctuosus =

Species of spider

Xysticus luctuosus is a species of crab spider in the family Thomisidae. It is found in North America, Europe, Turkey, Caucasus, a range from Russia (European to Far East), and Kazakhstan.
