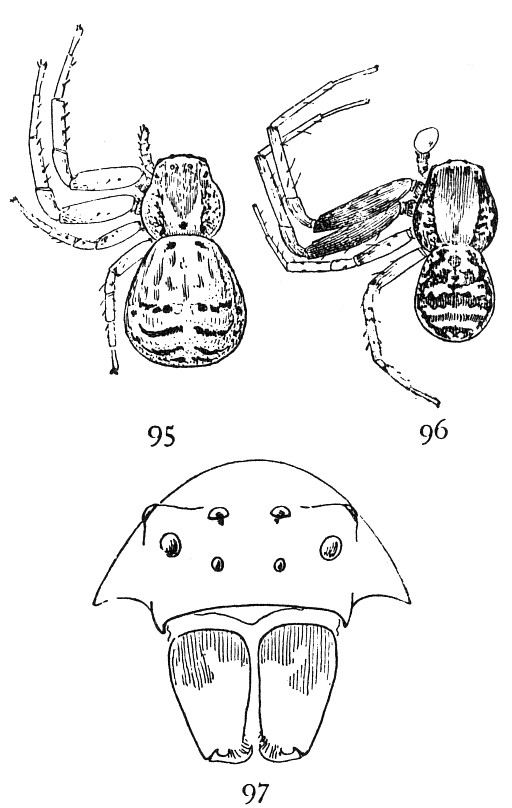

Scientific classification
- Kingdom: Animalia
- Phylum: Arthropoda
- Subphylum: Chelicerata
- Class: Arachnida
- Order: Araneae
- Infraorder: Araneomorphae
- Family: Thomisidae
- Genus: Xysticus
- Species: X. triguttatus

Binomial name
- Xysticus triguttatus Keyserling, 1880

= Xysticus triguttatus =

Species of spider

Xysticus triguttatus, the three-banded crab spider, is a species of crab spider in the family Thomisidae. It is found in the United States and Canada.

Three-banded crab spider, Xysticus triguttatus
