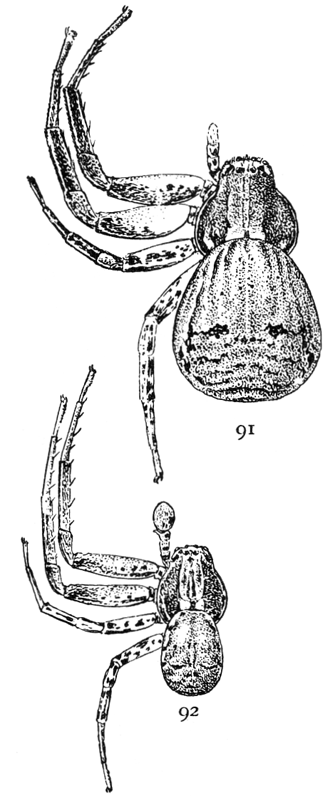

Scientific classification
- Kingdom: Animalia
- Phylum: Arthropoda
- Subphylum: Chelicerata
- Class: Arachnida
- Order: Araneae
- Infraorder: Araneomorphae
- Family: Thomisidae
- Genus: Xysticus
- Species: X. gulosus

Binomial name
- Xysticus gulosus Keyserling, 1880

= Xysticus gulosus =

Species of spider

Xysticus gulosus is a species of crab spiders in the family Thomisidae. It is found in North America.
