= Xysticus simonstownensis =

Scientific classification
- Kingdom: Animalia
- Phylum: Arthropoda
- Subphylum: Chelicerata
- Class: Arachnida
- Order: Araneae
- Infraorder: Araneomorphae
- Family: Thomisidae
- Genus: Xysticus
- Species: X. simonstownensis

Binomial name
- Xysticus simonstownensis Strand, 1909

Species of spider

Xysticus simonstownensis is a species of spider in the family Thomisidae. It is endemic to the Western Cape province of South Africa.

== Distribution ==
Xysticus simonstownensis is endemic to the Western Cape province of South Africa. The species is known only from the type locality at Simon's Town, where it occurs at 125 m above sea level.

== Habitat and ecology ==
Xysticus simonstownensis are free-living ground dwellers.

== Conservation ==
Xysticus simonstownensis is listed as Data Deficient for taxonomic reasons. The species was described from a juvenile specimen, and the status remains obscure. More sampling is needed to collect female and male adults and to determine the species' range.

== Taxonomy ==
The species was originally described by Embrik Strand in 1909 from Simon's Town. African species of Xysticus have not been revised. The species is known only from a juvenile specimen without illustrations, and more sampling is needed to collect adult material.
