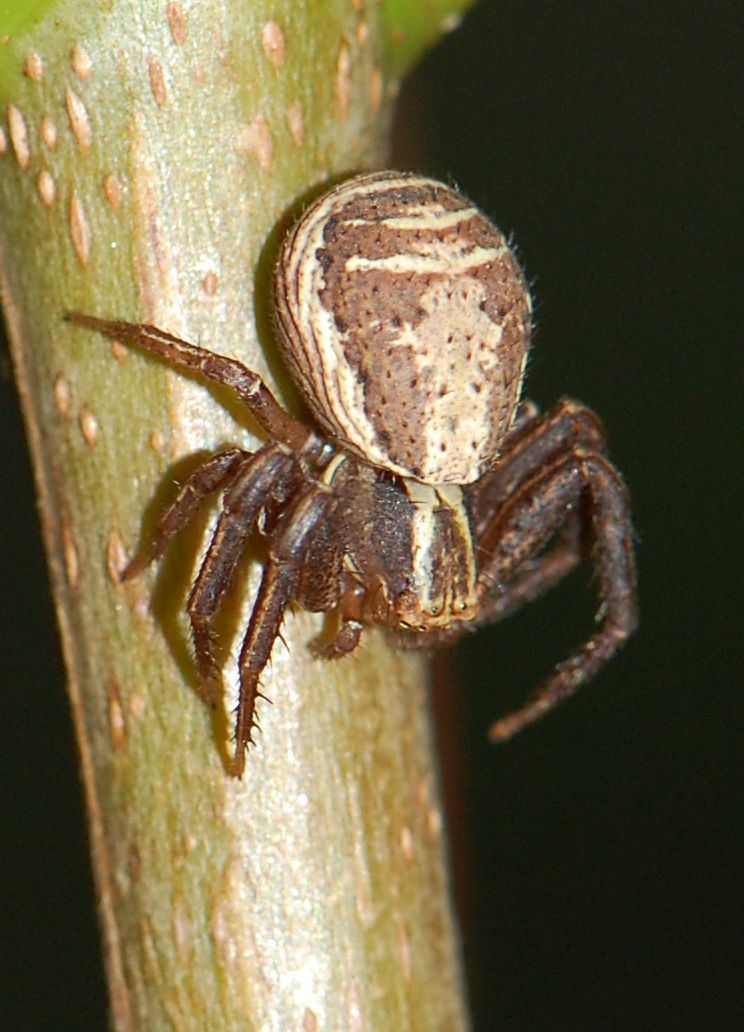

Scientific classification
- Kingdom: Animalia
- Phylum: Arthropoda
- Subphylum: Chelicerata
- Class: Arachnida
- Order: Araneae
- Infraorder: Araneomorphae
- Family: Thomisidae
- Genus: Xysticus
- Species: X. ulmi

Binomial name
- Xysticus ulmi (Hahn, 1831)

Synonyms
- Thomisus ulmi Hahn, 1831; Thomisus bivittatus Westring, 1861; Thomisus westwoodii O. Pickard-Cambridge, 1871; Xysticus bivittatus (Westring, 1861)

= Xysticus ulmi =

Species of spider

Xysticus ulmi, the swamp crab spider, is a European crab spider of the family Thomisidae which prefers damp habitats. It was first described by the German zoologist Carl Wilhelm Hahn in 1831.

== Description ==
Males have a body length male of 3–4 mm, females 5–8.3 mm. The triangle on the carapace and the abdomen are much more elongated in Xysticus ulmi compared to the other Xysticus spiders. The leaf-like pattern (the folium) on the dorsum is brownish with some whitish transverse lines towards the posterior. The legs are marked with fine spots. Xysticus ulmi is sexually dimorphic; males are darker than females and the patella and femora of the first and second legs are black.

== Habitat ==
Xyticus ulmi is usually found on low vegetation and in the ground layer in damp places, especially in wetlands and rough grassland, but in it can also occur in ditches alongside arable fields, hedges, roadside verges and woodland especially where the canopy is not closed, such as coppiced areas. In Europe it is found from the lowlands up to alpine regions.

== Biology ==
Spiderlings are often found in the litter at the base of vegetation while adults usually occur in herbage. Females guard their egg-sacs, usually near the tip of higher plants. In Britain, the adult spiders are found mainly in May and June with females sometimes being seen into the autumn. Like other members of the genus it is an ambush predator, lying in wait for invertebrate prey. The males subdue the females by stroking their legs then tie them down with silk before mating.

== Distribution ==
Xysticus ulmi has a palearctic distribution. It is found throughout Europe but it is absent from Iceland. In Britain it avoids very dry areas and becomes scarcer in Scotland.
