= Xysticus californicus =

Scientific classification
- Kingdom: Animalia
- Phylum: Arthropoda
- Subphylum: Chelicerata
- Class: Arachnida
- Order: Araneae
- Infraorder: Araneomorphae
- Family: Thomisidae
- Genus: Xysticus
- Species: X. californicus

Binomial name
- Xysticus californicus Keyserling, 1880

Species of spider

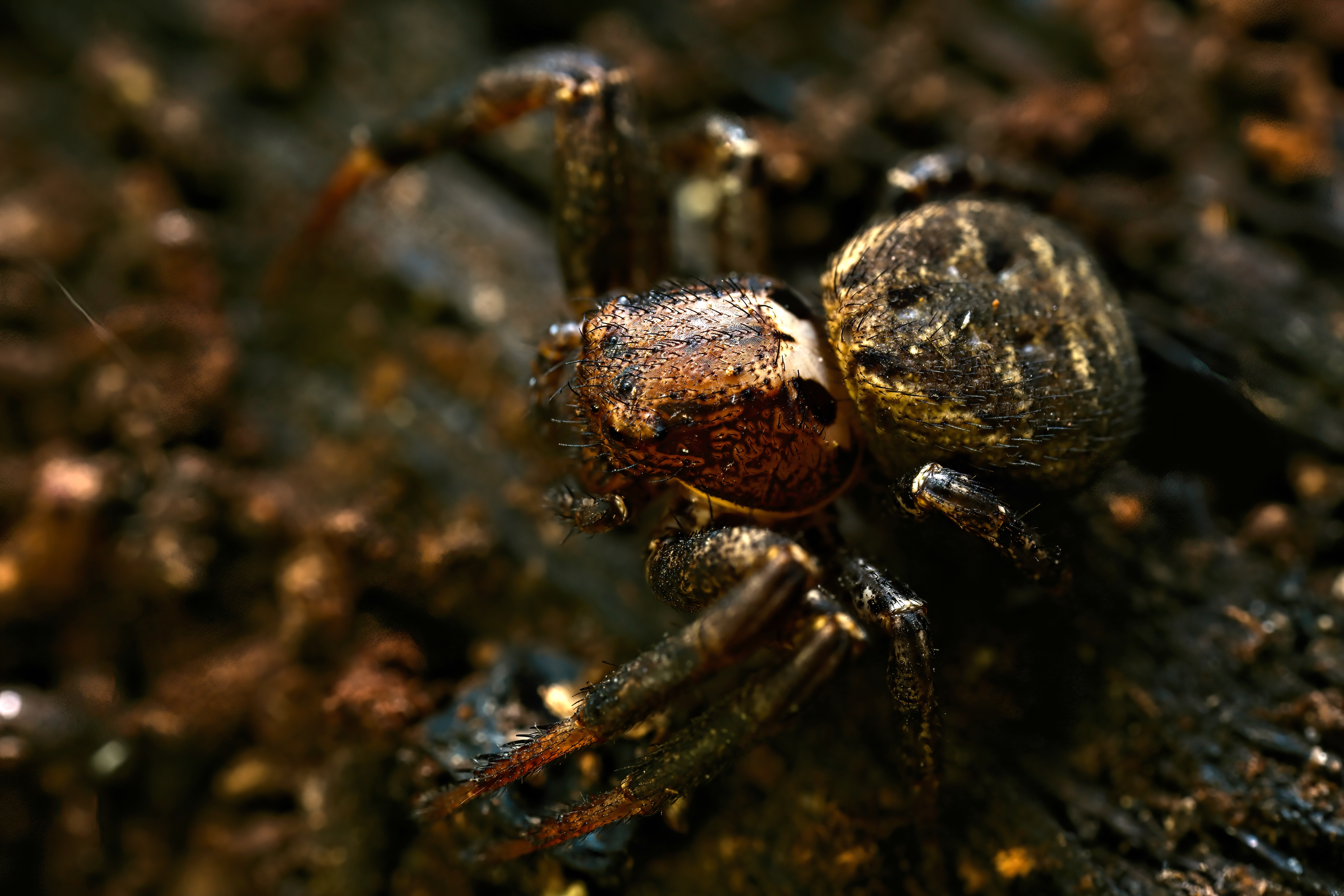
Xysticus californicus in the soil in California

Xysticus californicus is a species of crab spider in the family Thomisidae. It is found in the United States and Mexico.
