= Xysticus punctatus =

Scientific classification
- Kingdom: Animalia
- Phylum: Arthropoda
- Subphylum: Chelicerata
- Class: Arachnida
- Order: Araneae
- Infraorder: Araneomorphae
- Family: Thomisidae
- Genus: Xysticus
- Species: X. punctatus

Binomial name
- Xysticus punctatus Keyserling, 1880

Species of spider

Xysticus punctatus is a species of crab spider in the family Thomisidae. It is found in the United States and Canada.
