= Xysticus fervidus =

Scientific classification
- Kingdom: Animalia
- Phylum: Arthropoda
- Subphylum: Chelicerata
- Class: Arachnida
- Order: Araneae
- Infraorder: Araneomorphae
- Family: Thomisidae
- Genus: Xysticus
- Species: X. fervidus

Binomial name
- Xysticus fervidus Gerstch, 1953

Species of spider

Xysticus fervidus is a species of crab spider in the family Thomisidae. It is found in the United States and Canada.
