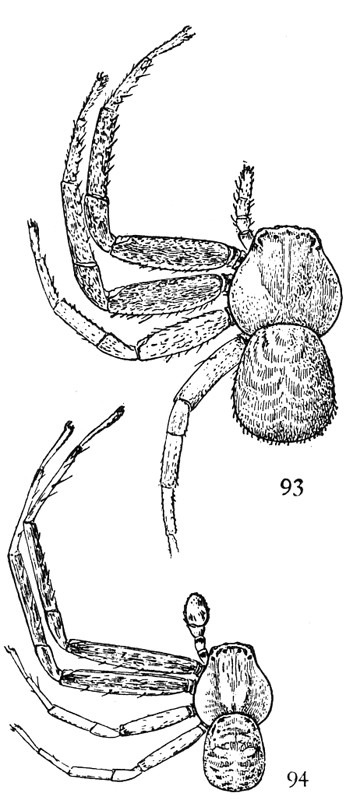

Scientific classification
- Kingdom: Animalia
- Phylum: Arthropoda
- Subphylum: Chelicerata
- Class: Arachnida
- Order: Araneae
- Infraorder: Araneomorphae
- Family: Thomisidae
- Genus: Xysticus
- Species: X. funestus

Binomial name
- Xysticus funestus Keyserling, 1880

= Xysticus funestus =

Species of spider

Xysticus funestus, the mournful ground crab spider, the sad ground crab spider or the deadly ground crab spider is a species of ground crab spider in the family Thomisidae. It is found in North America.

Despite one of the suggested common names - ‘deadly ground crab spider’, Xysticus funestus poses no threat to humans nor common pets. Bites are extremely rare due to the spider's natural avoidance of humans, and none of the group have bites that are medically significant for humans - typically only causing minor swelling and redness at the wound site.
