= Xysticus namaquensis =

Scientific classification
- Kingdom: Animalia
- Phylum: Arthropoda
- Subphylum: Chelicerata
- Class: Arachnida
- Order: Araneae
- Infraorder: Araneomorphae
- Family: Thomisidae
- Genus: Xysticus
- Species: X. namaquensis

Binomial name
- Xysticus namaquensis Simon, 1910

Species of spider

Xysticus namaquensis is a species of spider in the family Thomisidae. It is endemic to the Northern Cape province of South Africa.

== Distribution ==
Xysticus namaquensis is endemic to the Northern Cape province of South Africa. The species is known from only three locations: Kuruman, Steinkopf, and Tswalu Kalahari Reserve. It occurs at an altitude of 870 m above sea level.

== Habitat and ecology ==
Xysticus namaquensis are free-living ground dwellers that inhabit the Succulent Karoo biome.

== Conservation ==
Xysticus namaquensis is listed as Data Deficient for taxonomic reasons. The status of the species remains obscure, and more sampling is needed to collect the male and determine the species' range. The species is protected in Tswalu Kalahari Reserve.

== Taxonomy ==
The species was originally described by Eugène Simon in 1910 from Steinkopf. African species of Xysticus have not been revised. The male is unknown and redescription of the type is needed. The species is known only from the female.
