= Xysticus montanensis =

Scientific classification
- Kingdom: Animalia
- Phylum: Arthropoda
- Subphylum: Chelicerata
- Class: Arachnida
- Order: Araneae
- Infraorder: Araneomorphae
- Family: Thomisidae
- Genus: Xysticus
- Species: X. montanensis

Binomial name
- Xysticus montanensis Keyserling, 1887

Species of spider

Xysticus montanensis is a species of crab spider in the family Thomisidae. It is found in the United States and Canada.
