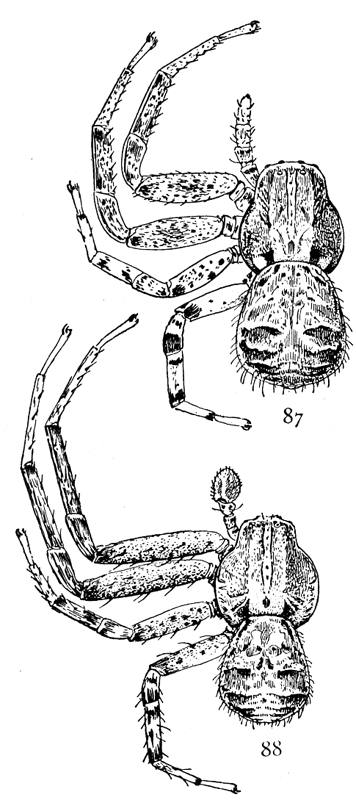

Scientific classification
- Kingdom: Animalia
- Phylum: Arthropoda
- Subphylum: Chelicerata
- Class: Arachnida
- Order: Araneae
- Infraorder: Araneomorphae
- Family: Thomisidae
- Genus: Xysticus
- Species: X. ferox

Binomial name
- Xysticus ferox (Hentz, 1847)

= Xysticus ferox =

Species of spider

Xysticus ferox, the brown crab spider, is a species of crab spider in the family Thomisidae. It is found in the USA and Canada.

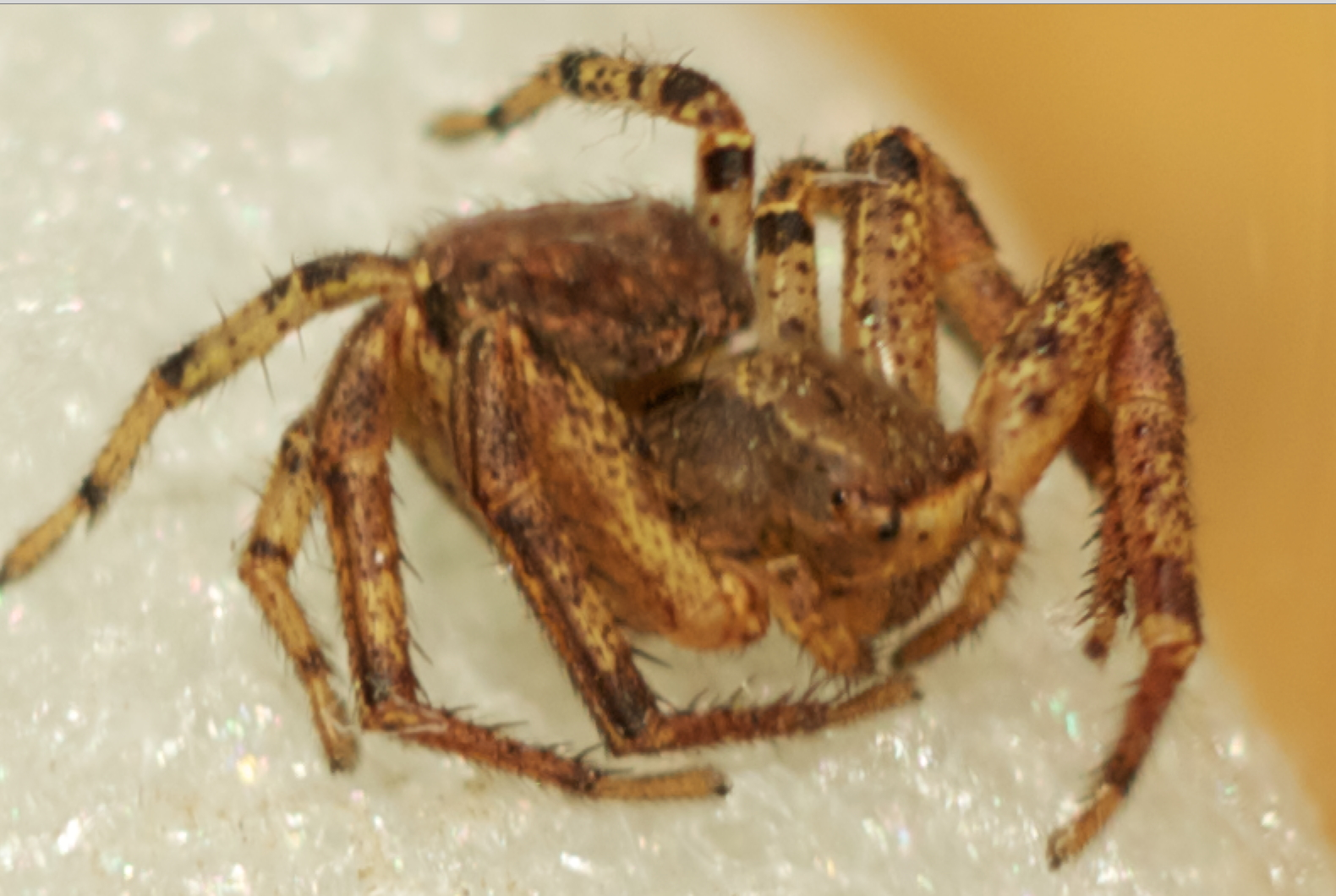
