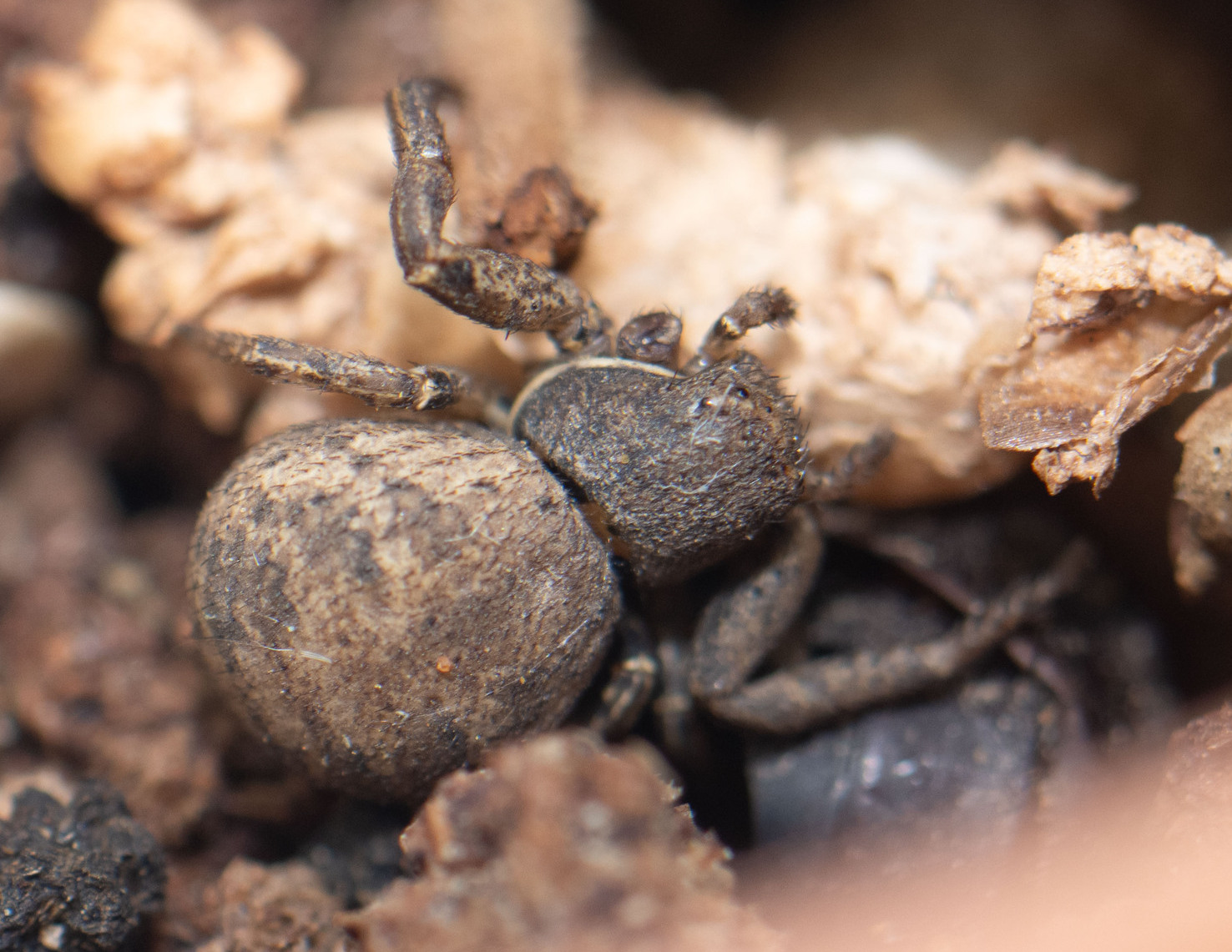
- Female
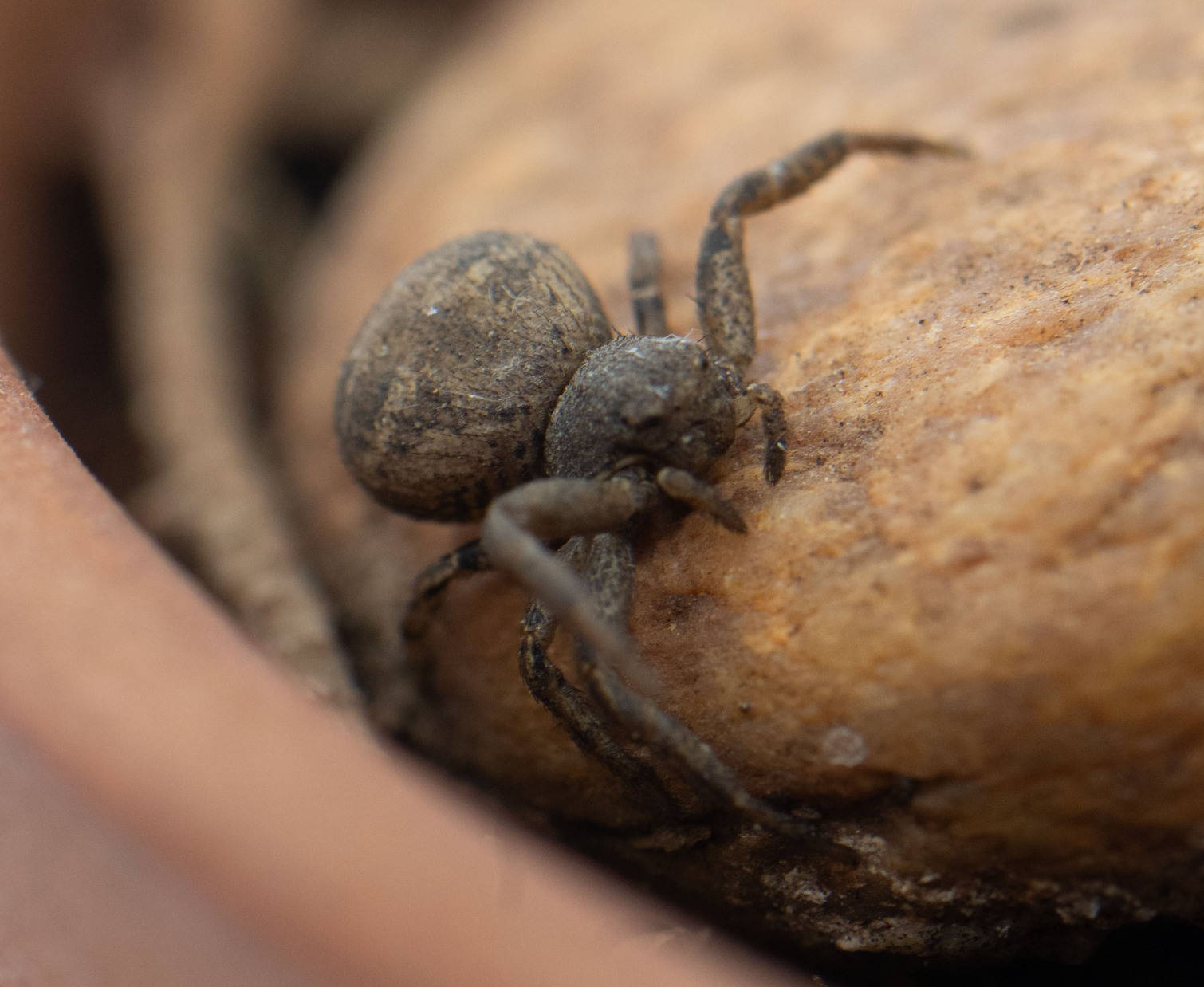
- Female

Scientific classification
- Kingdom: Animalia
- Phylum: Arthropoda
- Subphylum: Chelicerata
- Class: Arachnida
- Order: Araneae
- Infraorder: Araneomorphae
- Family: Thomisidae
- Genus: Xysticus
- Species: X. tugelanus

Binomial name
- Xysticus tugelanus Lawrence, 1942

= Xysticus tugelanus =

Tugela's Xysticus Ground Crab Spider

Species of spider

Xysticus tugelanus is a species of spider in the family Thomisidae. It occurs in Lesotho and South Africa, and is commonly known as Tugela's xysticus ground crab spider.

== Distribution ==
Xysticus tugelanus occurs in two southern African countries: Lesotho and South Africa. In South Africa, the species is distributed across four provinces: Eastern Cape, Gauteng, KwaZulu-Natal, and Western Cape. The species occurs at altitudes ranging from 62 to 2,894 m above sea level.

Notable South African locations include Qachas Nek, Prentjiesberg, Jeffreys Bay, Baviaanskloof Nature Reserve, Kliprivierberg Nature Reserve, Cathkin Peak, Garden Castle, Kamberg Nature Reserve, Cathedral Peak, and Swartberg Nature Reserve.

== Habitat and ecology ==
Xysticus tugelanus are ground dwellers that inhabit fynbos, grassland, and thicket biomes.

== Conservation ==
Xysticus tugelanus is listed as Least Concern by the South African National Biodiversity Institute due to its wide geographical range. The species is protected in four protected areas: Baviaanskloof Nature Reserve, Kliprivierberg Nature Reserve, Kamberg Nature Reserve, and Swartberg Nature Reserve. No conservation actions are recommended.

== Description ==
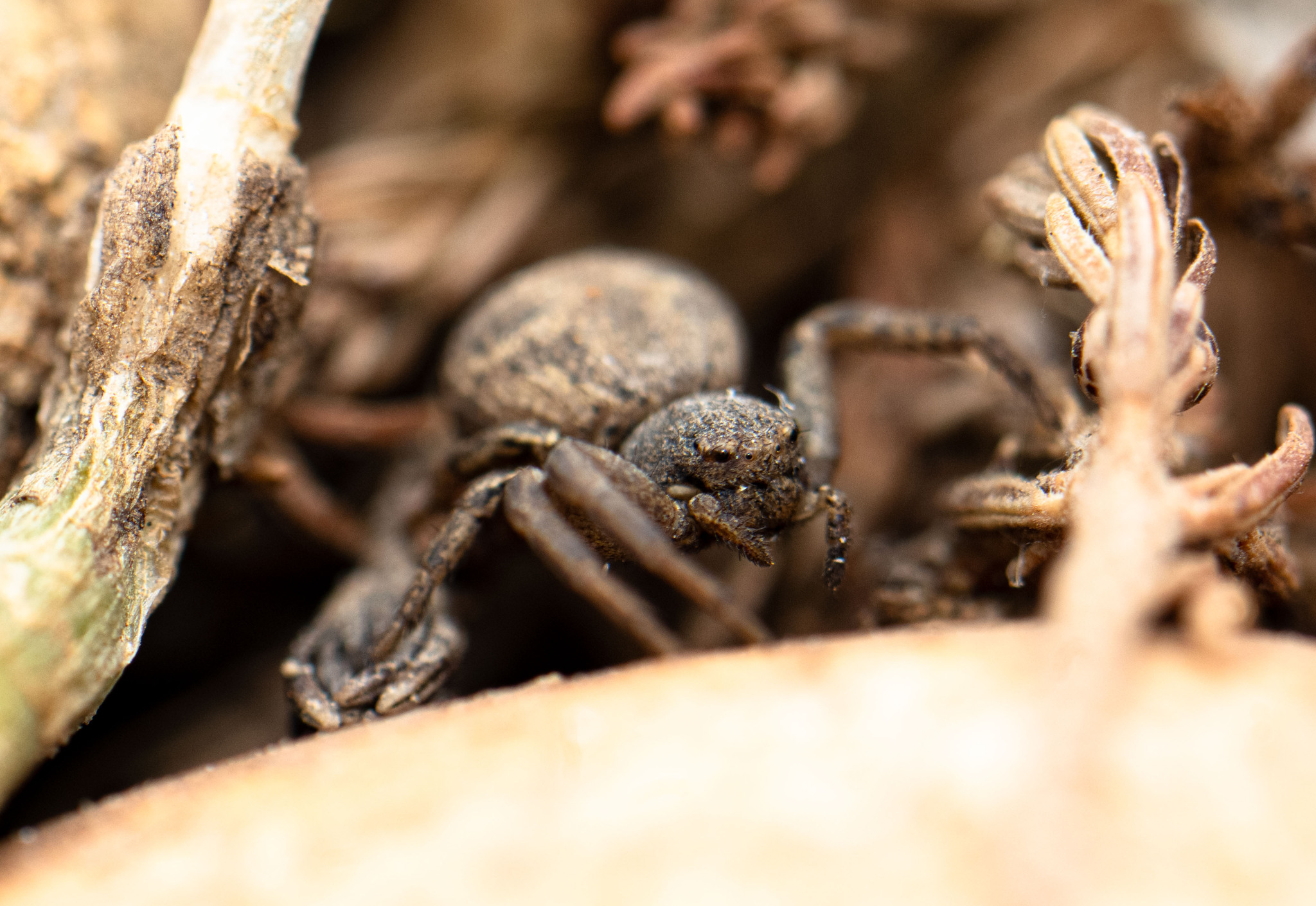
Female

== Taxonomy ==
The species was originally described by Reginald Frederick Lawrence in 1942 from Cathedral Peak in KwaZulu-Natal. African species of Xysticus have not been revised. The species is known only from the female.
