= List of Segestriidae species =

This page lists all described genera and species of the spider family Segestriidae. As of July 2021, the World Spider Catalog accepts 142 species in 5 genera:

== Ariadna ==
Ariadna

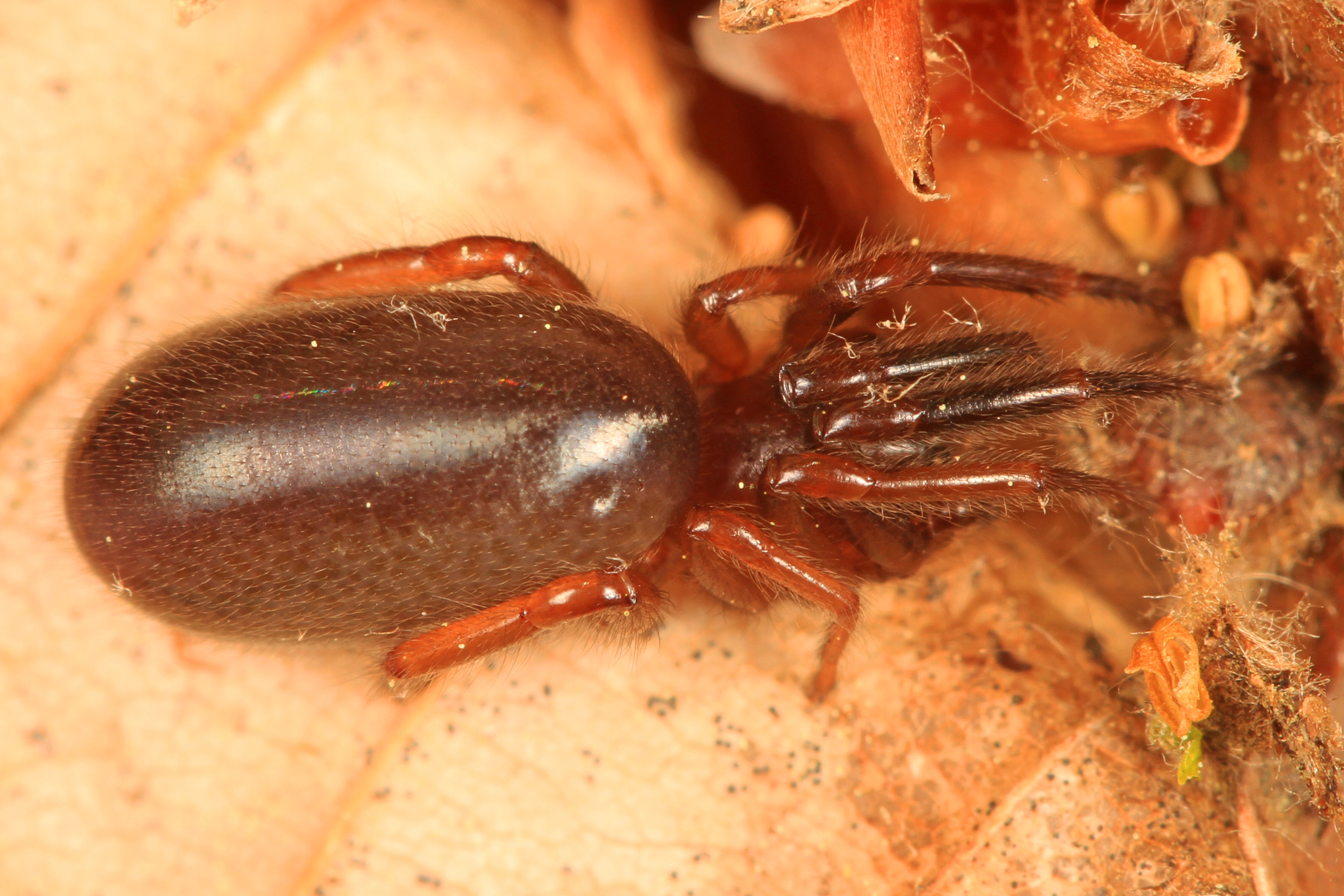
Ariadna bicolor

Ariadna Audouin, 1826

- Ariadna abbreviata Marsh, Stevens & Framenau, 2022 – Tasmania
- Ariadna abrilae Grismado, 2008 – Chile
- Ariadna algarvensis Wunderlich, 2011 – Portugal
- Ariadna alta Marsh, Stevens & Framenau, 2022 – Tasmania
- Ariadna amabilia Marsh, Stevens & Framenau, 2022 – Tasmania
- Ariadna araucana Grismado, 2008 – Chile
- Ariadna arenacea (Marsh, Stevens, Bradford & Framenau, 2022) – Australia (South Australia)
- Ariadna arthuri Petrunkevitch, 1926 – USA, Caribbean
- Ariadna aurea Giroti & Brescovit, 2018 – Brazil
- Ariadna barbigera Simon, 1905 – Chatham Islands
- Ariadna bellatoria Dalmas, 1917 – New Zealand
- Ariadna bellatula (Marsh, Stevens, Bradford & Framenau, 2022) – Australia (South Australia)
- Ariadna bicolor (Hentz, 1842) – USA, Mexico
- Ariadna bilineata Purcell, 1904 – South Africa
- Ariadna boesenbergi Keyserling, 1877 – Brazil, Uruguay, Argentina
- Ariadna boliviana Simon, 1907 – Bolivia, Suriname, Brazil, Paraguay
- Ariadna brevispina Caporiacco, 1947 – Tanzania
- Ariadna brignolii Wunderlich, 2011 – Italy
- Ariadna burchelli (Hogg, 1900) – Victoria
- Ariadna caerulea Keyserling, 1877 – Colombia, Ecuador
- Ariadna calilegua Grismado, 2008 – Argentina
- Ariadna canariensis Wunderlich, 1995 – Canary Islands
- Ariadna caparao Giroti & Brescovit, 2018 – Brazil
- Ariadna capensis Purcell, 1904 – South Africa
- Ariadna cephalotes Simon, 1907 – Peru, Bolivia, Argentina
- Ariadna changellkuk Grismado, 2008 – Chile
- Ariadna chayu (Wang & Zhang, 2022) – China
- Ariadna chhotae Siliwal & Yadav, 2017 – India
- Ariadna clavata Marsh, Baehr, Glatz & Framenau, 2018 – South Australia
- Ariadna comata O. Pickard-Cambridge, 1898 – Mexico
- Ariadna corticola Lawrence, 1952 – South Africa
- Ariadna crassipalpa (Blackwall, 1863) – Brazil
- Ariadna crypticola Marsh, Stevens & Framenau, 2022 – Tasmania
- Ariadna curvata (Marsh, Stevens, Bradford & Framenau, 2022) – Australia (South Australia)
- Ariadna cyprusensis Wunderlich, 2011 – Cyprus, Kos
- Ariadna daweiensis Yin, Xu & Bao, 2002 – China
- Ariadna decatetracantha Main, 1954 – Western Australia
- Ariadna dentigera Purcell, 1904 – South Africa
- Ariadna deserta (Marsh, Stevens, Bradford & Framenau, 2022) – Australia (South Australia)
- Ariadna dissimilis Berland, 1924 – New Caledonia
- Ariadna diucrura (Marsh, Stevens, Bradford & Framenau, 2022) – Australia (South Australia)
- Ariadna dysderina L. Koch, 1873 – Queensland
- Ariadna elaphra Wang, 1993 – China
- Ariadna europaensis Wunderlich, 2011 – Italy
- Ariadna exuviaque Wunderlich, 2011 – Mallorca
- Ariadna ferrogrisea Marsh, Stevens & Framenau, 2022 – Tasmania
- Ariadna flavescens (Marsh, Stevens, Bradford & Framenau, 2022) – Australia (South Australia)
- Ariadna formosa (Marsh, Stevens, Bradford & Framenau, 2022) – Australia (South Australia)
- Ariadna fragilis Marsh, Stevens & Framenau, 2022 – Tasmania
- Ariadna gallica Wunderlich, 2012 – France
- Ariadna gaucha Giroti & Brescovit, 2018 – Brazil
- Ariadna gonzo Marsh, Stevens & Framenau, 2022 – Tasmania
- Ariadna gryllotalpa (Purcell, 1904) – South Africa
- Ariadna hottentotta Purcell, 1908 – South Africa
- Ariadna inflata (Marsh, Stevens, Bradford & Framenau, 2022) – Australia (South Australia)
- Ariadna inops Wunderlich, 2011 – Portugal
- Ariadna insidiatrix Audouin, 1826 – Mediterranean
- Ariadna insula (Marsh, Stevens, Bradford & Framenau, 2022) – Australia (South Australia)
- Ariadna insularis Purcell, 1908 – South Africa
- Ariadna insulicola Yaginuma, 1967 – China, Korea, Japan
- Ariadna ionica O. Pickard-Cambridge, 1873 – Greece
- Ariadna ipojuca Giroti & Brescovit, 2018 – Brazil
- Ariadna isthmica Beatty, 1970 – Costa Rica, Nicaragua, Panama, Brazil
- Ariadna javana Kulczyński, 1911 – Java
- Ariadna jiuzhaigou (Wang & Zhang, 2022) – China
- Ariadna jubata Purcell, 1904 – South Africa
- Ariadna karrooica Purcell, 1904 – South Africa
- Ariadna kibonotensis Tullgren, 1910 – Tanzania
- Ariadna kisanganensis Benoit, 1974 – Congo
- Ariadna kiwirrkurra Baehr & Whyte, 2016 – Western Australia
- Ariadna kolbei Purcell, 1904 – South Africa
- Ariadna laeta Thorell, 1899 – Cameroon, Príncipe
- Ariadna lalen Giroti & Brescovit, 2018 – Chile
- Ariadna lateralis Karsch, 1881 – China, Korea, Taiwan, Japan
- Ariadna lebronneci Berland, 1933 – Marquesas Islands
- Ariadna lemosi Giroti & Brescovit, 2018 – Brazil
- Ariadna levii Grismado, 2008 – Chile
- Ariadna levyi Wunderlich, 2011 – Israel
- Ariadna lightfooti Purcell, 1904 – South Africa
- Ariadna maderiana Warburton, 1892 – Madeira, Salvages
- Ariadna major Hickman, 1929 – Tasmania
- Ariadna maroccana Wunderlich, 2011 – Morocco
- Ariadna masculina Lawrence, 1928 – Namibia
- Ariadna maxima (Nicolet, 1849) – Chile, Argentina, Juan Fernandez Is.
- Ariadna mbalensis Lessert, 1933 – Angola
- Ariadna meruensis Tullgren, 1910 – Tanzania
- Ariadna mollis (Holmberg, 1876) – Brazil, Uruguay, Argentina
- Ariadna molur Siliwal & Yadav, 2017 – India
- Ariadna montana Rainbow, 1920 – Lord Howe Islands
- Ariadna monticola Thorell, 1897 – Myanmar
- Ariadna motumotirohiva Giroti, Cotoras, Lazo & Brescovit, 2020 – Chile
- Ariadna multispinosa Bryant, 1948 – Hispaniola
- Ariadna muscosa Hickman, 1929 – Tasmania
- Ariadna natalis Pocock, 1900 – South Africa, Christmas Islands
- Ariadna nebulosa Simon, 1906 – India
- Ariadna neocaledonica Berland, 1924 – New Caledonia
- Ariadna obscura (Blackwall, 1858) – Peru, Brazil
- Ariadna octospinata (Lamb, 1911) – Queensland
- Ariadna oreades Simon, 1906 – Sri Lanka
- Ariadna otwayensis (Marsh, Stevens, Bradford & Framenau, 2022) – Australia (Victoria)
- Ariadna papuana Kulczyński, 1911 – New Guinea
- Ariadna pectinella Strand, 1913 – Central Africa
- Ariadna pelia Wang, 1993 – China
- Ariadna perkinsi Simon, 1900 – Hawaii
- Ariadna phantasma Marsh, Hudson & Framenau, 2021 – Western Australia
- Ariadna pilifera O. Pickard-Cambridge, 1898 – USA, Mexico
- Ariadna pollex (Marsh, Stevens, Bradford & Framenau, 2022) – Australia (South Australia)
- Ariadna propria (Marsh, Stevens, Bradford & Framenau, 2022) – Australia (South Australia)
- Ariadna pulchripes Purcell, 1908 – South Africa
- Ariadna rapinatrix Thorell, 1899 – Cameroon, Príncipe
- Ariadna reginae Giroti & Brescovit, 2018 – Mexico, Guatemala, Belize, Costa Rica
- Ariadna rutila (Marsh, Stevens, Bradford & Framenau, 2022) – Australia (South Australia)
- Ariadna ruwenzorica Strand, 1913 – Central Africa
- Ariadna sansibarica Strand, 1907 – Zanzibar
- Ariadna scabripes Purcell, 1904 – South Africa
- Ariadna segestrioides Purcell, 1904 – South Africa
- Ariadna segmentata Simon, 1893 – Tasmania
- Ariadna septemcincta (Urquhart, 1891) – New Zealand
- Ariadna similis Purcell, 1908 – South Africa
- Ariadna simplex (Marsh, Stevens, Bradford & Framenau, 2022) – Australia (South Australia)
- Ariadna sinuosa (Marsh, Stevens, Bradford & Framenau, 2022) – Australia (Victoria)
- Ariadna snellemanni (van Hasselt, 1882) – Sumatra, Krakatau, Philippines
- Ariadna spinosa (Marsh, Stevens, Bradford & Framenau, 2022) – Australia (South Australia)
- Ariadna subnubila Marsh, Stevens & Framenau, 2022 – Tasmania
- Ariadna subplana (Marsh, Stevens, Bradford & Framenau, 2022) – Australia (South Australia)
- Ariadna tangara Marsh, Baehr, Glatz & Framenau, 2018 – South Australia
- Ariadna taprobanica Simon, 1906 – Sri Lanka
- Ariadna tarsalis Banks, 1902 – Peru, Ecuador
- Ariadna thylacinus Marsh, Stevens & Framenau, 2022 – Tasmania
- Ariadna thyrianthina Simon, 1908 – Western Australia
- Ariadna tigrina Marsh, Stevens & Framenau, 2022 – Tasmania
- Ariadna tovarensis Simon, 1893 – Venezuela
- Ariadna tria (Marsh, Stevens, Bradford & Framenau, 2022) – Australia (Victoria)
- Ariadna ubajara Giroti & Brescovit, 2018 – Brazil
- Ariadna umbra (Marsh, Stevens, Bradford & Framenau, 2022) – Australia (South Australia)
- Ariadna umtalica Purcell, 1904 – South Africa
- Ariadna una (Marsh, Stevens, Bradford & Framenau, 2022) – Australia (South Australia)
- Ariadna uncinata Tang, Li & Yang, 2019 – China
- Ariadna ungua (Marsh, Stevens, Bradford & Framenau, 2022) – Australia (South Australia)
- Ariadna ustulata Simon, 1898 – Seychelles
- Ariadna valida (Marsh, Stevens, Bradford & Framenau, 2022) – Australia (South Australia)
- Ariadna vansda Siliwal, Yadav & Kumar, 2017 – India
- Ariadna weaveri Beatty, 1970 – Mexico
- Ariadna woinarskii (Marsh, Stevens, Bradford & Framenau, 2022) – Australia (South Australia)
- Ariadna yintiaoling (Wang & Zhang, 2022) – China

== Citharoceps ==
Citharoceps Chamberlin, 1924

- Citharoceps cruzana (Chamberlin & Ivie, 1935) — USA
- Citharoceps fidicina Chamberlin, 1924 (type) — USA, Mexico

== Gippsicola ==
Gippsicola Hogg, 1900

- Gippsicola lineata Giroti & Brescovit, 2017 — Australia (Queensland)
- Gippsicola minuta Giroti & Brescovit, 2017 — Australia (Queensland)
- Gippsicola raleighi Hogg, 1900 (type) — Australia (Western, South, Victoria)
- Gippsicola robusta Giroti & Brescovit, 2017 — Australia (Queensland, New South Wales)

== Indoseges ==
Indoseges Siliwal, Das, Choudhury & Giroti, 2021

- Indoseges chilika Siliwal, Das, Choudhury & Giroti, 2021 — India
- Indoseges malkangiri Choudhury, Siliwal, Das & Giroti, 2021 (type) — India
- Indoseges narayani Choudhury, Siliwal, Das & Giroti, 2021 — India
- Indoseges satkosia Das, Siliwal, Choudhury & Giroti, 2021 — India
- Indoseges sushildutta Siliwal, Das, Choudhury, & Giroti, 2021 — India

== Segestria ==
Segestria Latreille, 1804

- Segestria bavarica C. L. Koch, 1843 — Europe to Azerbaijan
- Segestria bella Chamberlin & Ivie, 1935 — USA
- Segestria cavernicola Kulczyński, 1915 — Italy
- Segestria croatica Doleschall, 1852 — Croatia
- Segestria danzantica Chamberlin, 1924 — Mexico
- Segestria davidi Simon, 1884 — Syria
- Segestria fengi (Fomichev & Marusik, 2020) — China
- Segestria florentina (Rossi, 1790) (type) — Europe to Georgia. Introduced to Brazil, Uruguay, Argentina
- Segestria fusca Simon, 1882 — Portugal, Spain, France, Italy
- Segestria inda Simon, 1906 — India
- Segestria madagascarensis Keyserling, 1877 — Madagascar
- Segestria mirshamsii Marusik & Omelko, 2014 — Iran
- Segestria nekhaevae Fomichev & Marusik, 2020 — Tajikistan
- Segestria nipponica Kishida, 1913 — Japan
- Segestria pacifica Banks, 1891 — USA
- Segestria pusiola Simon, 1882 — Spain, France (Corsica), Algeria
- Segestria saeva Walckenaer, 1837 — New Zealand
- Segestria sbordonii Brignoli, 1984 — Greece (Crete)
- Segestria senoculata (Linnaeus, 1758) — Europe, Turkey, Caucasus, Iran, Japan
  - Segestria senoculata castrodunensis Gétaz, 1889 — Switzerland
- Segestria shtoppelae Fomichev & Marusik, 2020 — Kazakhstan
- Segestria turkestanica Dunin, 1986 — Central Asia
