= Ariadna hottentotta =

Kamaggas Tube-Web Spider

Conservation status
- Least Concern (SANBI Red List)

Scientific classification
- Kingdom: Animalia
- Phylum: Arthropoda
- Subphylum: Chelicerata
- Class: Arachnida
- Order: Araneae
- Infraorder: Araneomorphae
- Family: Segestriidae
- Genus: Ariadna
- Species: A. hottentotta

Binomial name
- Ariadna hottentotta Purcell, 1908

Species of spider

Ariadna hottentotta is a species of spider in the family Segestriidae. It is endemic to South Africa and is commonly known as the Kamaggas tube-web spider.

== Distribution ==
Ariadna hottentotta is known from three South African provinces: Eastern Cape, Northern Cape, and Western Cape. The species occurs at altitudes ranging from 1,212 to 1,513 m above sea level. Notable locations include Mountain Zebra National Park, Karoo National Park, and the type locality Kamaggas.

== Habitat and ecology ==
The species inhabits multiple biomes including Nama Karoo, Succulent Karoo, and Grassland biomes. It constructs tube signal-webs made in crevices of walls, rocks, fallen tree trunks, or bark of trees.

== Description ==
Females are reddish yellow in colour with the cephalothorax darkened on the side of the head anteriorly. The two posterior pairs of legs are somewhat paler than the anterior pairs. The abdomen is pale-yellowish with a broad dorsal band of purplish-black extending from end to end. Chelicerae are dark-red to reddish black. Total length is 8.5 mm.

== Conservation ==
Ariadna hottentotta is listed as Least Concern by the South African National Biodiversity Institute due to its wide geographical range. The species is protected in Karoo National Park, Mountain Zebra National Park, and Asante Game Reserve.

== Taxonomy ==
The species was originally described by W. F. Purcell in 1908 from Kamaggas in the Northern Cape. Only females are known.
