= Ariadna kolbei =

Kentani Tube-Web Spider

Scientific classification
- Kingdom: Animalia
- Phylum: Arthropoda
- Subphylum: Chelicerata
- Class: Arachnida
- Order: Araneae
- Infraorder: Araneomorphae
- Family: Segestriidae
- Genus: Ariadna
- Species: A. kolbei

Binomial name
- Ariadna kolbei Purcell, 1904

Species of spider

Ariadna kolbei is a species of spider in the family Segestriidae. It is endemic to the Eastern Cape of South Africa and is commonly known as the Kentani tube-web spider.

== Distribution ==
Ariadna kolbei is known only from the type locality Kentani in the Eastern Cape, at an altitude of 485 m above sea level.

== Habitat and ecology ==
The species inhabits the Thicket biome and constructs tube signal-webs made in crevices of walls, rocks, fallen tree trunks, or bark of trees.

== Description ==
Females have a dark reddish-brown carapace, very dark anteriorly. Chelicerae are black. Posterior legs are rufescent, while the anterior legs are reddish, with the first pair dark red and lighter patella. The abdomen is pallid, suffused with dark purplish above, especially posteriorly. The sternum is yellowish-brown and the labium is dark brown. Total length is 14.25 mm.

== Conservation ==
Ariadna kolbei is listed as data deficient for taxonomic reasons. More sampling is needed to collect males and determine the species' range.

== Taxonomy ==
The species was originally described by W. F. Purcell in 1904 from Kentani. Only females are known.
