= Ariadna taprobanica =

Scientific classification
- Kingdom: Animalia
- Phylum: Arthropoda
- Subphylum: Chelicerata
- Class: Arachnida
- Order: Araneae
- Infraorder: Araneomorphae
- Family: Segestriidae
- Genus: Ariadna
- Species: A. taprobanica

Binomial name
- Ariadna taprobanica Simon, 1906

Species of spider

Ariadna taprobanica is a species of spider of the genus Ariadna. It is endemic to Sri Lanka.
