= Ariadna scabripes =

Karoo Tube-Web Spider

Scientific classification
- Kingdom: Animalia
- Phylum: Arthropoda
- Subphylum: Chelicerata
- Class: Arachnida
- Order: Araneae
- Infraorder: Araneomorphae
- Family: Segestriidae
- Genus: Ariadna
- Species: A. scabripes

Binomial name
- Ariadna scabripes Purcell, 1904

Species of spider

Ariadna scabripes is a species of spider in the family Segestriidae. It is endemic to the Northern Cape of South Africa and is commonly known as the Karoo tube-web spider.

== Distribution ==
Ariadna scabripes is known only from the type locality Hanover in the Northern Cape, at an altitude of 1,358 m above sea level.

== Habitat and ecology ==
The species inhabits the Nama Karoo biome and constructs tube signal-webs made in crevices of walls, rocks, fallen tree trunks, or bark of trees.

== Description ==
Females have a yellow carapace with lateral margins not blackened. The cephalic portion is paler behind, brown at the sides and in front, and blackened at the anterior margin, at least laterally. Chelicerae are brown or brownish-yellow, black at apex.

The abdomen is pallid, with the upper surface more or less suffused with dark purplish and the ventral surface with a pair of purplish patches posteriorly. Legs are almost uniformly pale yellowish, with anterior tarsi often darker than other segments. Coxae and sternum are pale yellowish, with the sternum sometimes partly purplish. The labium is mostly infuscated at base, pale yellowish at apex.

Total length of the largest female is 9.75 mm.

== Conservation ==
Ariadna scabripes is listed as data deficient for taxonomic reasons. More sampling is needed to collect males and determine the species' range.

== Taxonomy ==
The species was originally described by W. F. Purcell in 1904 from Hanover. Only females are known.
