= Ariadna lightfooti =

Pale-footed Tube-Web Spider

Scientific classification
- Kingdom: Animalia
- Phylum: Arthropoda
- Subphylum: Chelicerata
- Class: Arachnida
- Order: Araneae
- Infraorder: Araneomorphae
- Family: Segestriidae
- Genus: Ariadna
- Species: A. lightfooti

Binomial name
- Ariadna lightfooti Purcell, 1904

Species of spider

Ariadna lightfooti is a species of spider in the family Segestriidae. It is endemic to South Africa and is commonly known as the pale-footed tube-web spider.

== Distribution ==
Ariadna lightfooti has been sampled from three South African provinces, Eastern Cape, Northern Cape, and Western Cape. The species occurs at altitudes ranging from 224 to 1,162 m above sea level. Notable locations include the type locality Caledon, Addo Elephant National Park, Kamaggas, and Tswalu Kalahari Reserve.

== Habitat and ecology ==
The species inhabits multiple biomes including Fynbos, Nama Karoo, and Succulent Karoo biomes. It constructs tube signal-webs made in crevices of walls, rocks, fallen tree trunks, or bark of trees.

== Description ==
Females have a pale yellowish carapace with black hairs, lightly infuscated at the sides posteriorly with finely blackened margins. Legs are pale yellowish with femora, patellae and tibia more or less infuscated on the sides. Chelicerae are yellowish. The abdomen is purplish-black with a narrow yellow line on each side, and the epigastric area is pallid except for a black transverse patch in front of the vulva. The sternum is black. The labium and coxae are pale yellowish, narrowly blackened at the tips. Total length is 11 mm.

== Conservation ==
Ariadna lightfooti is listed as least concern by the South African National Biodiversity Institute due to its wide geographical range. The species is protected in Addo Elephant National Park and Tswalu Kalahari Reserve.

== Taxonomy ==
The species was originally described by W. F. Purcell in 1904 from Caledon in the Western Cape. Only females are known.
