= Ariadna gryllotalpa =

Scientific classification
- Kingdom: Animalia
- Phylum: Arthropoda
- Subphylum: Chelicerata
- Class: Arachnida
- Order: Araneae
- Infraorder: Araneomorphae
- Family: Segestriidae
- Genus: Ariadna
- Species: A. gryllotalpa

Binomial name
- Ariadna gryllotalpa (Purcell, 1904)

Synonyms
- Segestriella gryllotalpa Purcell, 1904

Species of spider

Ariadna gryllotalpa is a species of spider in the family Segestriidae. It is endemic to the Western Cape of South Africa.

== Distribution ==
Ariadna gryllotalpa is known only from the type locality at Stompneus, St Helena Bay in the Western Cape, at an altitude of 109 m above sea level.

== Habitat and ecology ==
The species inhabits the Fynbos biome and constructs tube signal-webs made in crevices of walls, rocks, fallen tree trunks, or bark of trees.

== Description ==
Females have a brownish red carapace, yellowish at the sides posteriorly and at the hind margin, with some radiating infuscate marks. The head is dark reddish-brown to nearly black. The abdomen is pale yellowish with purplish-black markings including a band crossing the anterior end above the pedicel and extending backwards down each side to the middle. Legs are pale, with the second pair infuscate on the dorsal surface. Total length is 10.25 mm.

== Conservation ==
Ariadna gryllotalpa is listed as Data Deficient for taxonomic reasons. More sampling is needed to collect males and determine the species' range.

== Taxonomy ==
The species was originally described by W. F. Purcell in 1904 as Segestriella gryllotalpa from Stompneus, St Helena Bay. Only females are known.
