= Ariadna oreades =

Scientific classification
- Kingdom: Animalia
- Phylum: Arthropoda
- Subphylum: Chelicerata
- Class: Arachnida
- Order: Araneae
- Infraorder: Araneomorphae
- Family: Segestriidae
- Genus: Ariadna
- Species: A. oreades

Binomial name
- Ariadna oreades Simon, 1906

Species of spider

Ariadna oreades, is a species of spider of the genus Ariadna. It is endemic to Sri Lanka.
