= Ariadna ustulata =

Conservation status
- Critically Endangered (IUCN 3.1)

Scientific classification
- Kingdom: Animalia
- Phylum: Arthropoda
- Subphylum: Chelicerata
- Class: Arachnida
- Order: Araneae
- Infraorder: Araneomorphae
- Family: Segestriidae
- Genus: Ariadna
- Species: A. ustulata

Binomial name
- Ariadna ustulata Simon, 1898

Species of spider

Ariadna ustulata is a species of tube-dwelling spider that is endemic to the Seychelles. It has not been recorded on Mahé since 1894, and appears to be restricted to Mont Dauban on Silhouette Island. Its adult population is estimated to be about 7,000 individuals. It is restricted to cloud forests, where it lives in mosses. It is threatened by habitat deterioration from invasive plants, especially Cinnamomum verum, and drying of cloud forests due to climate change.
