= Ariadna inops =

Scientific classification
- Domain: Eukaryota
- Kingdom: Animalia
- Phylum: Arthropoda
- Subphylum: Chelicerata
- Class: Arachnida
- Order: Araneae
- Infraorder: Araneomorphae
- Family: Segestriidae
- Genus: Ariadna
- Species: A. inops

Binomial name
- Ariadna inops Wunderlich, 2011

Species of spider

Ariadna inops is a spider species in the family Segestriidae. It is endemic to Portugal.
