= Ariadna karrooica =

Hanover Tube-Web Spider

Scientific classification
- Kingdom: Animalia
- Phylum: Arthropoda
- Subphylum: Chelicerata
- Class: Arachnida
- Order: Araneae
- Infraorder: Araneomorphae
- Family: Segestriidae
- Genus: Ariadna
- Species: A. karrooica

Binomial name
- Ariadna karrooica Purcell, 1904

Species of spider

Ariadna karrooica is a species of spider in the family Segestriidae. It is endemic to South Africa and is commonly known as the Hanover tube-web spider.

== Distribution ==
Ariadna karrooica has been sampled from three South African provinces, Eastern Cape, Free State, and Northern Cape. The species occurs at altitudes ranging from 7 to 1,645 m above sea level. Notable locations include the type locality Hanover, Port Elizabeth, Benfontein Nature Reserve, and Tswalu Kalahari Reserve.

== Habitat and ecology ==
The species inhabits multiple biomes including Grassland, Nama Karoo, Savanna, and Thicket biomes. It constructs tube signal-webs made in crevices of walls, rocks, fallen tree trunks, or bark of trees.

== Description ==
The colour of the carapace and legs is similar to the darkest specimens of A. bilineata, but the anterior metatarsi are dark reddish or almost black. The abdomen is pallid, more or less suffused with purplish, at least on the dorsal and ventral surfaces, with the middle of the epigastric area and sometimes a couple of posterior ventral patches dark purplish. The sternum and labium are deep blackish-brown, with the labium sometimes paler at apex. Total length is 10 mm in females and 7.5 mm in males.

== Conservation ==
Ariadna karrooica is listed as least concern by the South African National Biodiversity Institute due to its wide geographical range. The species is protected in Benfontein Nature Reserve and Tswalu Kalahari Reserve.

== Taxonomy ==
The species was originally described by W. F. Purcell in 1904 from the type locality Hanover.
