= Ariadna bellatoria =

Conservation status
- Data Deficient (NZ TCS)

Scientific classification
- Domain: Eukaryota
- Kingdom: Animalia
- Phylum: Arthropoda
- Subphylum: Chelicerata
- Class: Arachnida
- Order: Araneae
- Infraorder: Araneomorphae
- Family: Segestriidae
- Genus: Ariadna
- Species: A. bellatoria

Binomial name
- Ariadna bellatoria Dalmas, 1917

Species of spider

Ariadna bellatoria is a species of tube-dwelling spider endemic to New Zealand.

== Taxonomy ==
This species was described in 1917 by Raymond Dalmas from a single female specimen collected in Taumaranui.

== Distribution ==
This speciesis only known from Taumaranui, New Zealand.

== Conservation status ==
Under the New Zealand Threat Classification System, this species is listed as "Naturally Uncommon" with the qualifiers of "Data Poor: Size" and "Data Poor: Trend".
