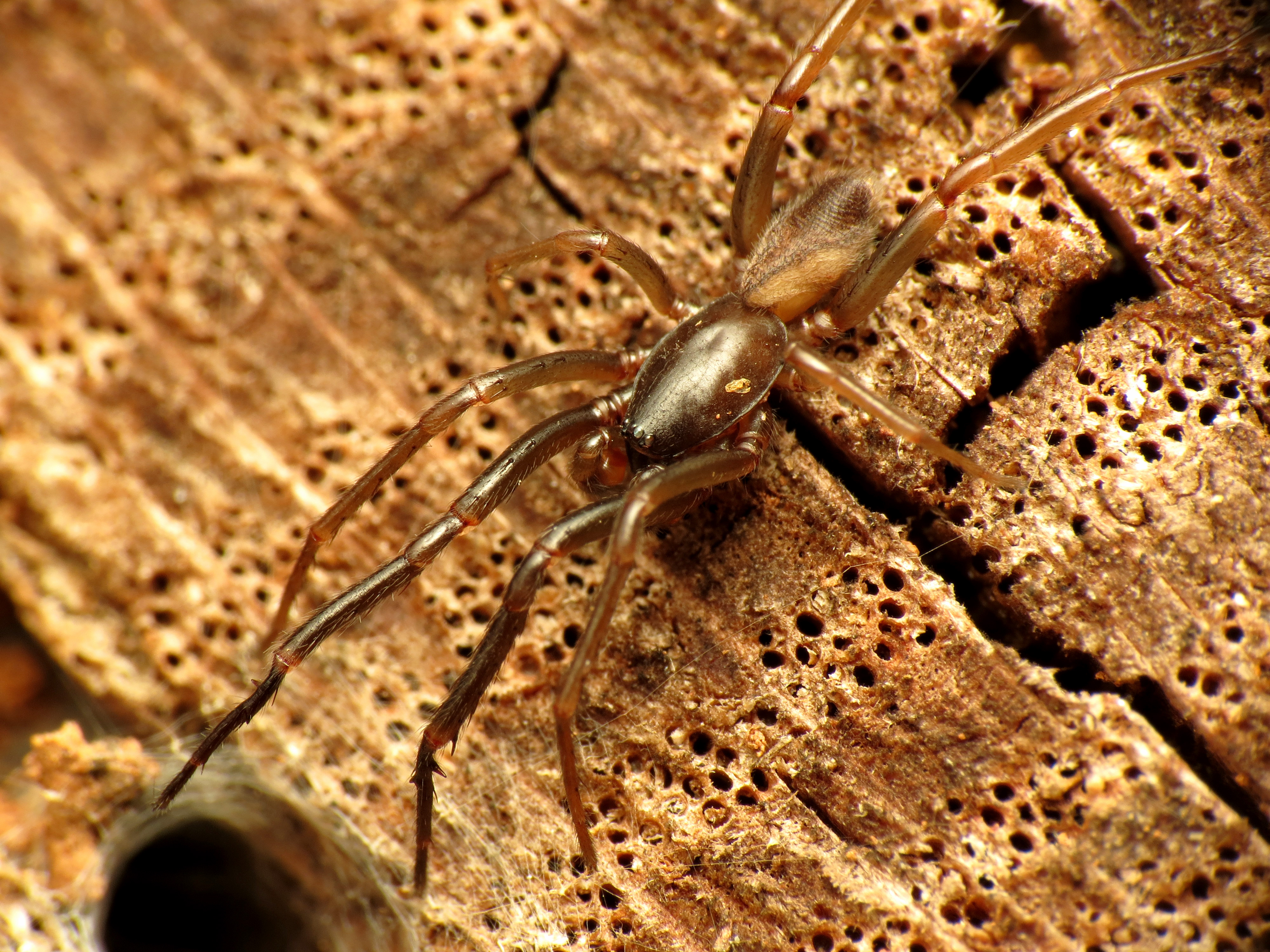
- Male Ariadna bicolor from Rock Creek Park, Washington, DC
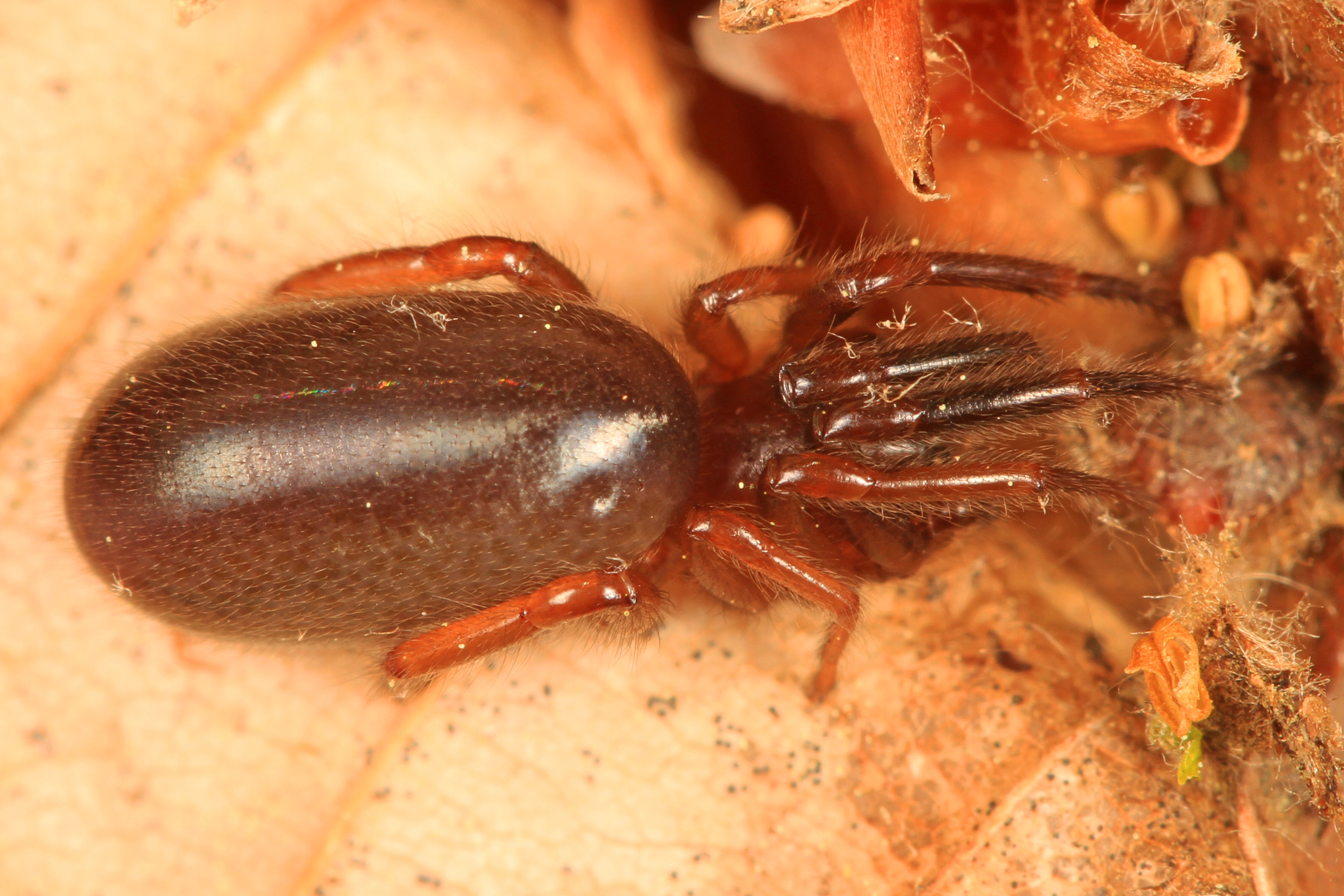
- Female Ariadna bicolor from Pickering Creek Audubon Center, Easton, Maryland

Scientific classification
- Domain: Eukaryota
- Kingdom: Animalia
- Phylum: Arthropoda
- Subphylum: Chelicerata
- Class: Arachnida
- Order: Araneae
- Infraorder: Araneomorphae
- Family: Segestriidae
- Genus: Ariadna
- Species: A. bicolor

Binomial name
- Ariadna bicolor (Hentz, 1842)

= Ariadna bicolor =

Species of spider

Ariadna bicolor is a tube-dwelling spider. Found in North America, the spider's cephalothorax and legs are yellowish-brown and its abdomen is purplish-brown.

John Henry Comstock said that the habitats of the species are remarkable. He brought the spiders from Ithaca and made them a home that had blocks nailed together that each had a hole. The spiders used the man-made habitat as a nest.

In a test about what species of spider replied the fastest to odors, Ariadna bicolor responded slowly. When they weren't in their tubes, they responded in 63 seconds to five oils. When they were in their tubes, they didn't respond to the odors at all.
