= Ariadna segestrioides =

Dunbrody Tube-Web Spider

Scientific classification
- Kingdom: Animalia
- Phylum: Arthropoda
- Subphylum: Chelicerata
- Class: Arachnida
- Order: Araneae
- Infraorder: Araneomorphae
- Family: Segestriidae
- Genus: Ariadna
- Species: A. segestrioides

Binomial name
- Ariadna segestrioides Purcell, 1904

Species of spider

Ariadna segestrioides is a species of spider in the family Segestriidae. It is endemic to the Eastern Cape of South Africa and is commonly known as the Dunbrody tube-web spider.

== Distribution ==
Ariadna segestrioides is known only from the type locality Dunbrody in the Eastern Cape, at an altitude of 66 m above sea level.

== Habitat and ecology ==
The species inhabits the Thicket biome and constructs tube signal-webs made in crevices of walls, rocks, fallen tree trunks, or bark of trees.

== Description ==
Females have a blackish-brown carapace, slightly paler in the middle. Chelicerae are reddish-black. Legs are blackish-brown to nearly black, with the two posterior pairs paler distally. Their tarsi and, to a lesser extent, their metatarsi are pale yellowish, while the two anterior pairs of tarsi are reddish.

The abdomen is pallid with a median series of purplish spots above. The underside is faintly suffused with purplish and has a dark purplish patch posteriorly before the spinners. The sternum and labium are blackish-brown. Total length is 10.75 mm.

== Conservation ==
Ariadna segestrioides is listed as data deficient for taxonomic reasons. More sampling is needed to collect males and determine the species' range.

== Taxonomy ==
The species was originally described by W. F. Purcell in 1904 from Dunbrody. Only females are known.
