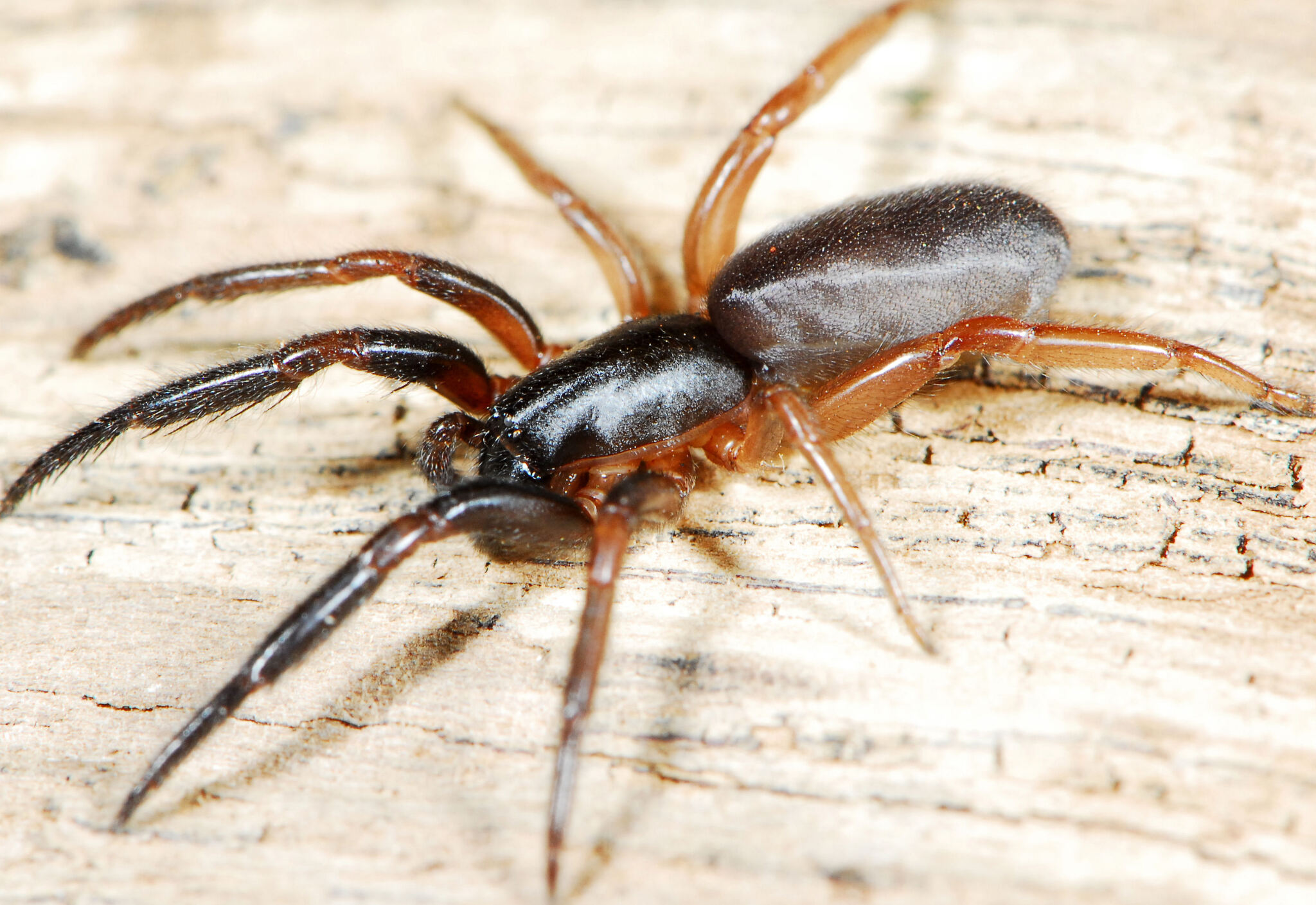
- Female
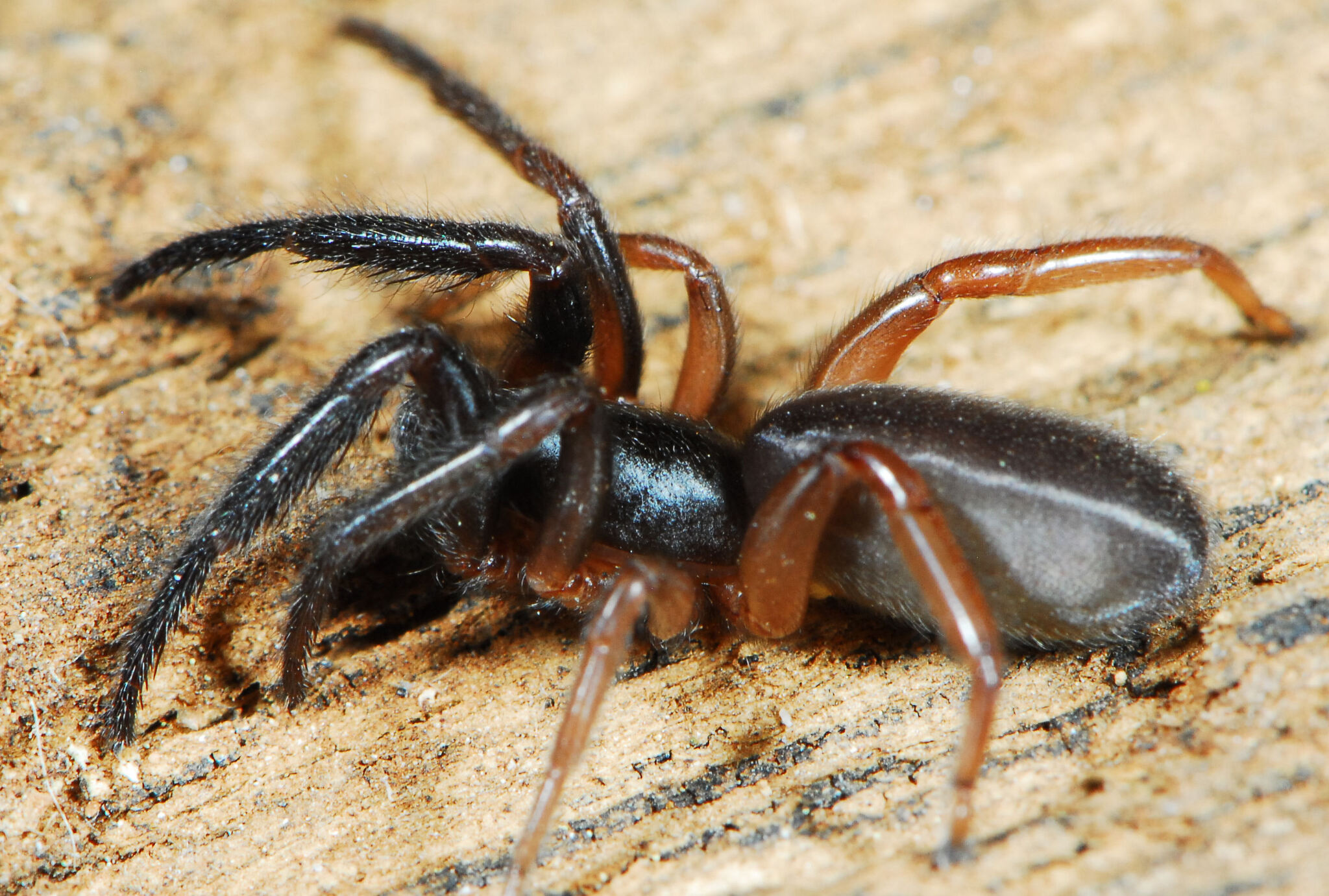
- Female

Scientific classification
- Kingdom: Animalia
- Phylum: Arthropoda
- Subphylum: Chelicerata
- Class: Arachnida
- Order: Araneae
- Infraorder: Araneomorphae
- Family: Segestriidae
- Genus: Ariadna
- Species: A. umtalica

Binomial name
- Ariadna umtalica Purcell, 1904

= Ariadna umtalica =

Zimbabwe Tube-Web Spider

Species of spider

Ariadna umtalica is a southern African species of spider in the family Segestriidae. It is commonly known as the Zimbabwe tube-web spider.

== Distribution ==
Ariadna umtalica was originally described from Zimbabwe and is also recorded from Botswana and South Africa. In South Africa, it is known only from the Northern Cape and Gauteng provinces.

== Habitat and ecology ==
The species inhabits the Savanna biome and constructs tube signal-webs made in crevices of walls, rocks, fallen tree trunks, or bark of trees. Males have been found under stones.

== Description ==
Females have a dark brown carapace with the ocular area black. Chelicerae are reddish-black. The abdomen is pallid, suffused with purplish. Legs are infuscated as in dark specimens of A. bilineata, with the two posterior pairs reddish-ochraceous and the anterior tibia and metatarsus blackish-red. The sternum and labium are brown, with the labium paler at apex. Total length is 12 mm.

== Conservation ==
Ariadna umtalica is listed as least concern by the South African National Biodiversity Institute due to its wide geographical range across Africa.

== Taxonomy ==
The species was originally described by W. F. Purcell in 1904 from Zimbabwe. Only females are described.
