= Ariadna insularis =

Namibia Tube-Web Spider

Conservation status
- Least Concern (SANBI Red List)

Scientific classification
- Kingdom: Animalia
- Phylum: Arthropoda
- Subphylum: Chelicerata
- Class: Arachnida
- Order: Araneae
- Infraorder: Araneomorphae
- Family: Segestriidae
- Genus: Ariadna
- Species: A. insularis

Binomial name
- Ariadna insularis Purcell, 1908

Species of spider

Ariadna insularis is a species of spider in the family Segestriidae. It occurs in Namibia and South Africa and is commonly known as the Namibia tube-web spider.

== Distribution ==
Ariadna insularis was originally described from Possession Island, Namibia. In South Africa, it is recorded only from the Northern Cape, where it occurs at altitudes ranging from 63 to 250 m above sea level. Locations include Namaqua National Park, Richtersveld Transfrontier National Park, Soebatsfontein, and Sendelingsdrif.

== Habitat and ecology ==
The species inhabits multiple biomes including Desert, Nama Karoo, and Succulent Karoo biomes. It constructs tube signal-webs made in crevices of walls, rocks, fallen tree trunks, or bark of trees.

== Description ==
Females have a dark mahogany-brown cephalothorax with the head blackish at the side. Legs are reddish-yellow with the two anterior pairs more reddish distally. The abdomen is pale yellowish with the posterior region, a broad mesial dorsal area, and the area between the first pair of lung-opercula purplish-black. The sternum is more or less infuscate, darker than the coxae. Total length is 14 mm.

== Conservation ==
Ariadna insularis is listed as Least Concern by the South African National Biodiversity Institute due to its wide geographical range across southern Africa. The species is protected in Namaqua National Park and Richtersveld Transfrontier National Park.

== Taxonomy ==
The species was originally described by W. F. Purcell in 1908 from Possession Island, Namibia. Only females are known.
