= Ariadna similis =

Mafikeng Tube-Web Spider

Scientific classification
- Kingdom: Animalia
- Phylum: Arthropoda
- Subphylum: Chelicerata
- Class: Arachnida
- Order: Araneae
- Infraorder: Araneomorphae
- Family: Segestriidae
- Genus: Ariadna
- Species: A. similis

Binomial name
- Ariadna similis Purcell, 1908

Species of spider

Ariadna similis is a species of spider in the family Segestriidae. It is endemic to the North West province of South Africa and is commonly known as the Mafikeng tube-web spider.

== Distribution ==
Ariadna similis is known only from the type locality Mafikeng in the North West province, at an altitude of 1,289 m above sea level.

== Habitat and ecology ==
The species inhabits the Savanna biome and constructs tube signal-webs made in crevices of walls, rocks, fallen tree trunks, or bark of trees.

== Description ==
The species resembles A. bilineata but is larger and darker in colour. Females have a reddish-yellow to dark reddish-brown carapace, darker anteriorly, with a hairy surface usually finely veined with black. Chelicerae are yellowish-red to black.

The abdomen has a fine, pale line running from end to end down the middle. Legs are faintly or strongly infuscated, with the anterior pairs darker than the posterior ones. Total length is 11.5 mm.

== Conservation ==
Ariadna similis is listed as data deficient for taxonomic reasons. More sampling is needed to collect males and determine the species' range.

== Taxonomy ==
The species was originally described by W. F. Purcell in 1908 from Mafikeng. Only females are known.
