= Ariadna septemcincta =

Conservation status
- Not Threatened (NZ TCS)

Scientific classification
- Domain: Eukaryota
- Kingdom: Animalia
- Phylum: Arthropoda
- Subphylum: Chelicerata
- Class: Arachnida
- Order: Araneae
- Infraorder: Araneomorphae
- Family: Segestriidae
- Genus: Ariadna
- Species: A. septemcincta

Binomial name
- Ariadna septemcincta (Urquhart, 1891)

Synonyms
- Oonops septem-cincta

Species of spider

Ariadna septemcincta is a species of tube-dwelling spider endemic to New Zealand.

== Taxonomy ==
This species was described in 1891 as "Oonops septem-cincta" by Arthur Urquhart from a single female specimen collected in Wellington. It was redescribed as Ariadna septemcincta in 1917.

== Description ==
The female is recorded as 10mm in length. The carapace is brown. The legs are yellowish brown. The abdomen is pale yellowish with yellowish markings.

== Distribution ==
This species is only known from Wellington, New Zealand.

== Conservation status ==
Under the New Zealand Threat Classification System, this species is listed as "Not Threatened".
