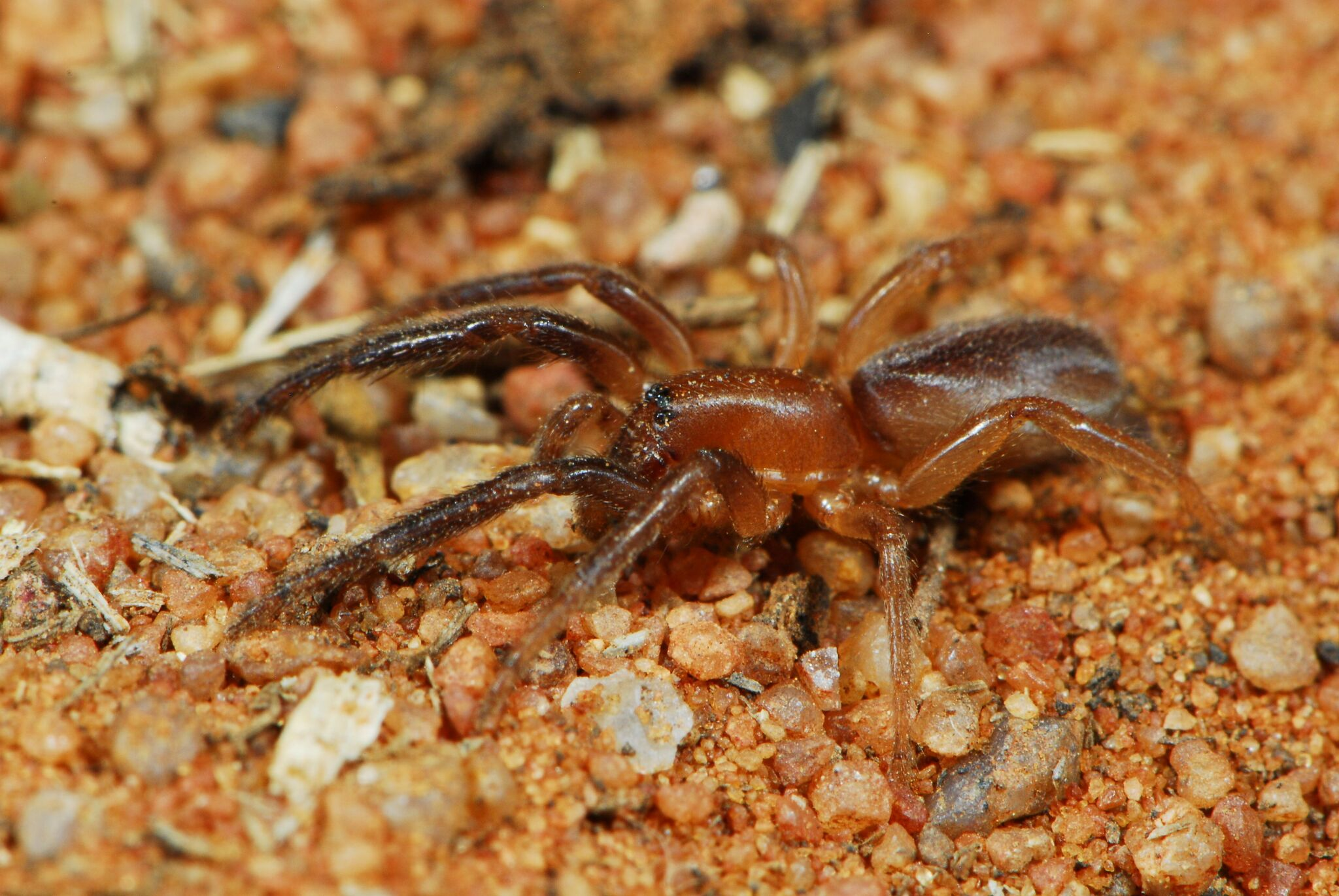
- Female
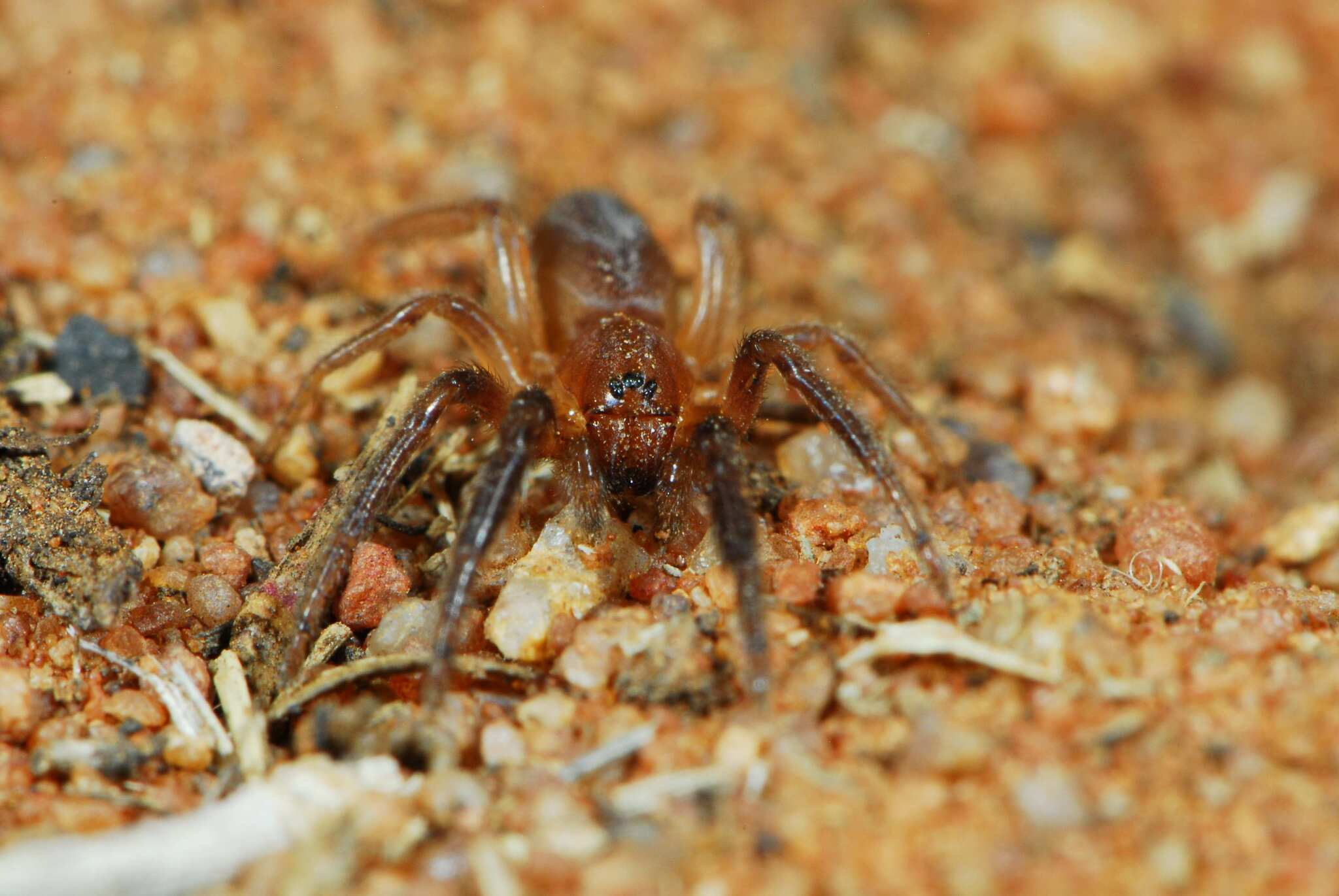
- Female

Scientific classification
- Kingdom: Animalia
- Phylum: Arthropoda
- Subphylum: Chelicerata
- Class: Arachnida
- Order: Araneae
- Infraorder: Araneomorphae
- Family: Segestriidae
- Genus: Ariadna
- Species: A. jubata

Binomial name
- Ariadna jubata Purcell, 1904

= Ariadna jubata =

Tsabis Tube-Web Spider

Species of spider

Ariadna jubata is a species of spider in the family Segestriidae. It is endemic to the Northern Cape of South Africa and is commonly known as the Tsabis tube-web spider.

== Distribution ==
Ariadna jubata is known from several localities in the Northern Cape, including Steinkopf, Richtersveld Transfrontier National Park, Tswalu Kalahari Reserve, and the type locality Tsabis. The species occurs at altitudes ranging from 250 to 1,155 m above sea level.

== Habitat and ecology ==
The species inhabits Desert and Succulent Karoo biomes. It constructs tube signal-webs made in crevices of walls, rocks, fallen tree trunks, or bark of trees. Males have been found under stones.

== Description ==
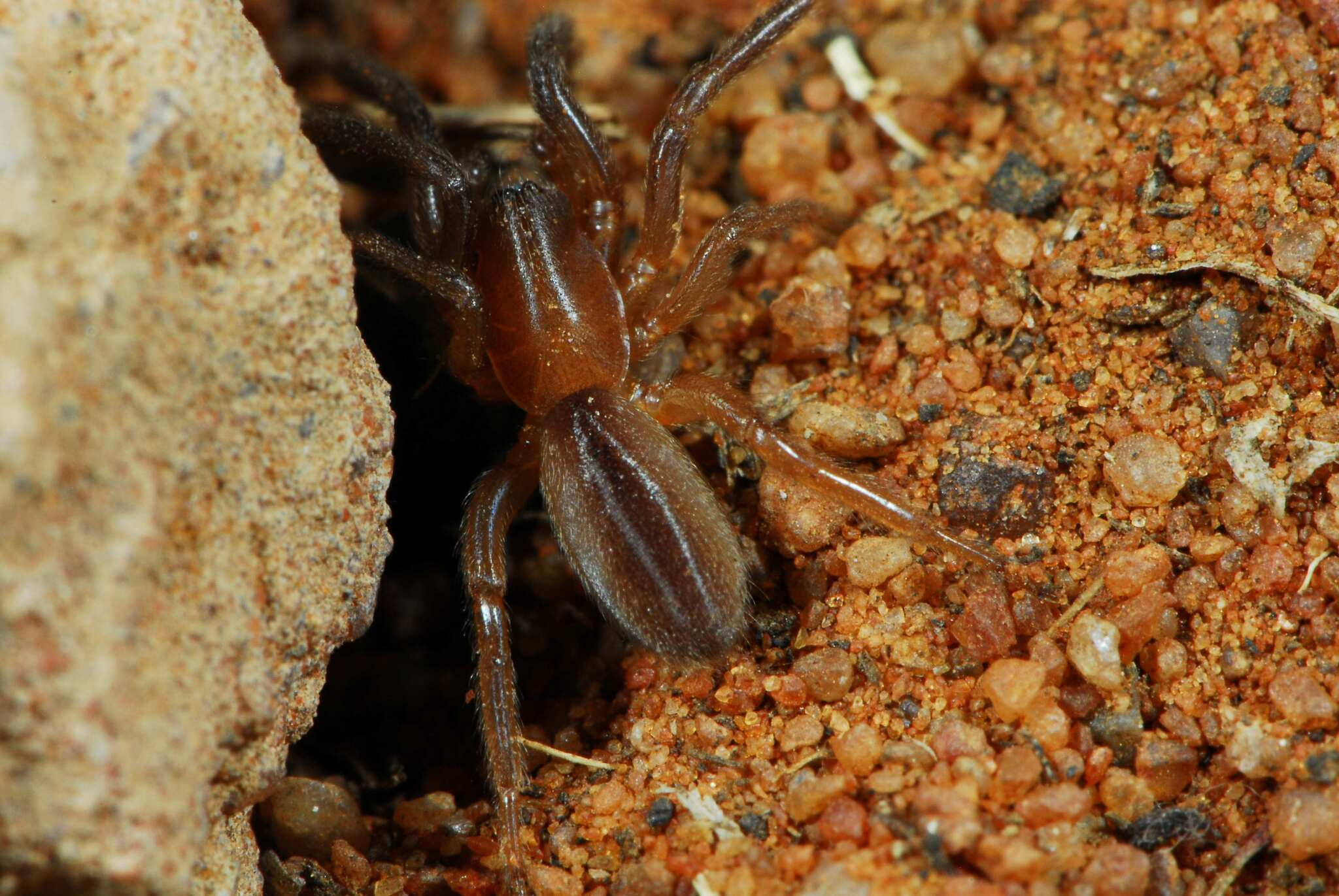
female

Females have a light brown carapace with the cephalic portion darkened on each side in front. Chelicerae are dark reddish-brown. Posterior pairs of legs are pale ochraceous, while anterior pairs are reddish-yellow or reddish and infuscated. The abdomen is purplish-black with narrow markings posteriorly below. The sternum and labium are brownish-yellow, with the labium dark brown on each side. Total length is 9.5 mm.

== Conservation ==
Ariadna jubata is listed as Least Concern by the South African National Biodiversity Institute due to its wide geographical range. The species is protected in Richtersveld Transfrontier National Park and Tswalu Kalahari Reserve.

== Taxonomy ==
The species was originally described by W. F. Purcell in 1904 from Tsabis. Only females are known.
