= Ariadna dentigera =

Scientific classification
- Kingdom: Animalia
- Phylum: Arthropoda
- Subphylum: Chelicerata
- Class: Arachnida
- Order: Araneae
- Infraorder: Araneomorphae
- Family: Segestriidae
- Genus: Ariadna
- Species: A. dentigera

Binomial name
- Ariadna dentigera Purcell, 1904

Species of spider

Ariadna dentigera is a species of spider in the family Segestriidae. It is endemic to the Western Cape of South Africa.

== Distribution ==
Ariadna dentigera is known from three locations in the Western Cape, Table Mountain, Kirstenbosch National Botanical Garden, and Hermanus. The species occurs at 9 m above sea level.

== Habitat and ecology ==
The species inhabits the Fynbos biome and constructs tube signal-webs made in a variety of habitats.

== Conservation ==
Ariadna dentigera is listed as Data Deficient for taxonomic reasons. More sampling is needed to collect males and determine the species' range. The species is protected in Table Mountain National Park.

== Taxonomy ==
The species was originally described by W. F. Purcell in 1904 from Table Mountain National Park. Only females are known. Females have a dark reddish-brown carapace, almost black anteriorly, with an iridescent sheen and finely blackened margins. Chelicerae are black with a strong iridescent sheen.

The abdomen is pale yellow below and brown between the pulmonary opercula, with the dorsal surface dark. Legs and sternum are reddish-brown, with anterior legs slightly more reddish distally but without dorsal markings. Total length is 13.5 mm.
