= Ariadna capensis =

Scientific classification
- Kingdom: Animalia
- Phylum: Arthropoda
- Subphylum: Chelicerata
- Class: Arachnida
- Order: Araneae
- Infraorder: Araneomorphae
- Family: Segestriidae
- Genus: Ariadna
- Species: A. capensis

Binomial name
- Ariadna capensis Purcell, 1904

Species of spider

Ariadna capensis is a species of spider in the family Segestriidae. It is endemic to the Western Cape of South Africa.

== Distribution ==
Ariadna capensis is known from three locations in the Western Cape, Wynberg Caves on Table Mountain, and two sites in the Cederberg Wilderness Area at Sawadee and Wupperthal. The species occurs at altitudes ranging from 24 to 481 m above sea level.

== Habitat and ecology ==
The species inhabits the Fynbos biome and constructs tube signal-webs made in crevices of walls, rocks, fallen tree trunks, or bark of trees.

== Conservation ==
Ariadna capensis is listed as Data Deficient for taxonomic reasons. More sampling is needed to collect males and determine the species' range. The species is protected in the Cederberg Wilderness Area and Table Mountain National Park.

== Taxonomy ==
The species was originally described by W. F. Purcell in 1904 from Wynberg Hill, Table Mountain. Only females are known. Females have a brownish-red carapace with the head darker, especially in the anterior region. Chelicerae are reddish-black and the labium is dark brown, paler at apex. The abdomen is purplish-black with a narrow yellow line on each side. Total length is 9.25 mm.
