= Ariadna barbigera =

Conservation status
- Naturally Uncommon (NZ TCS)

Scientific classification
- Kingdom: Animalia
- Phylum: Arthropoda
- Subphylum: Chelicerata
- Class: Arachnida
- Order: Araneae
- Infraorder: Araneomorphae
- Family: Segestriidae
- Genus: Ariadna
- Species: A. barbigera

Binomial name
- Ariadna barbigera Simon, 1905

Species of spider

Ariadna barbigera is a species of tube-dwelling spider endemic to New Zealand.

== Taxonomy ==
This species was described in 1905 by Eugène Simon from female specimens collected by Hugo Schauinsland during his 1896-1897 trip to the Chatham Islands.

== Description ==
The female is recorded as 8-10mm in length. The carapace dark brown.

== Distribution ==
This species is only known from the Chatham Islands, New Zealand.

== Conservation status ==
Under the New Zealand Threat Classification System, this species is listed as "Naturally Uncommon" with the qualifiers of "Island Endemic" and "Range Restricted".
