= Citharoceps =

Scientific classification
- Kingdom: Animalia
- Phylum: Arthropoda
- Subphylum: Chelicerata
- Class: Arachnida
- Order: Araneae
- Infraorder: Araneomorphae
- Family: Segestriidae
- Genus: Citharoceps; Chamberlin

Genus of spiders

Citharoceps is a genus of spiders in the family Segestriidae. It was first described in 1924 by Ralph Vary Chamberlin.

== Species ==
As of April 2021, the genus contained two species:

- Citharoceps cruzana (Chamberlin & Ivie, 1935) - US
- Citharoceps fidicina Chamberlin, 1924 - US, Mexico
