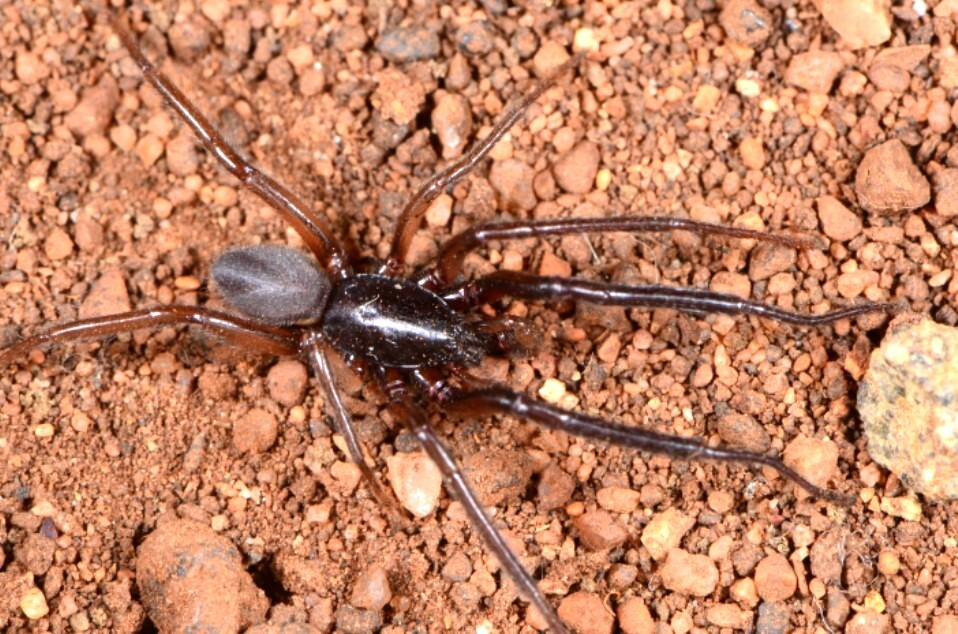
- Male

Scientific classification
- Kingdom: Animalia
- Phylum: Arthropoda
- Subphylum: Chelicerata
- Class: Arachnida
- Order: Araneae
- Infraorder: Araneomorphae
- Family: Segestriidae
- Genus: Ariadna
- Species: A. corticola

Binomial name
- Ariadna corticola Lawrence, 1952

= Ariadna corticola =

Bow-legged Tube-Web Spider

Species of spider

Ariadna corticola is a species of spider in the family Segestriidae. It is endemic to South Africa and is commonly known as the bow-legged tube-web spider.

== Distribution ==
Ariadna corticola has a wide distribution across five South African provinces: Eastern Cape, Free State, Gauteng, KwaZulu-Natal, Limpopo, and Mpumalanga. The species occurs in more than ten protected areas at altitudes ranging from 7 to 1,690 m above sea level.

== Habitat and ecology ==
The species inhabits multiple biomes including the Indian Ocean Coastal Belt, Forest, Grassland, Savanna, and Thicket biomes. It constructs tube signal-webs made in crevices of walls, rocks, fallen tree trunks, or bark of trees. The holotype female was collected under the bark of the fever tree Vachellia xanthophloea, while the male was found in a nest below a fallen tree trunk in the same locality.

== Description ==
Females have a blackish-brown carapace and mouthparts, almost black, with the posterior apex of sternum slightly lighter. The abdomen is light to dark brown with an olive green tinge. Leg I is dark. Males are generally paler in colour than females, with a brown carapace and mandibles, reddish-brown sternum and labium, and yellow-brown legs. The apex of femur, patella and tibia of leg I are darker with an olive tinge. The metatarsus I appears as a strong sigmoid curve when viewed from below. The abdomen is dark olive brown. Total length is 9 mm.

== Conservation ==
Ariadna corticola is listed as Least Concern by the South African National Biodiversity Institute due to its wide geographical range. The species is protected in several conservation areas including Kruger National Park, Lekgalameetse Nature Reserve, Tembe Elephant Park, Ophathe Game Reserve, and Ndumo Game Reserve.

== Taxonomy ==
The species was originally described by R. F. Lawrence in 1952 from Ingwavuma in KwaZulu-Natal.
