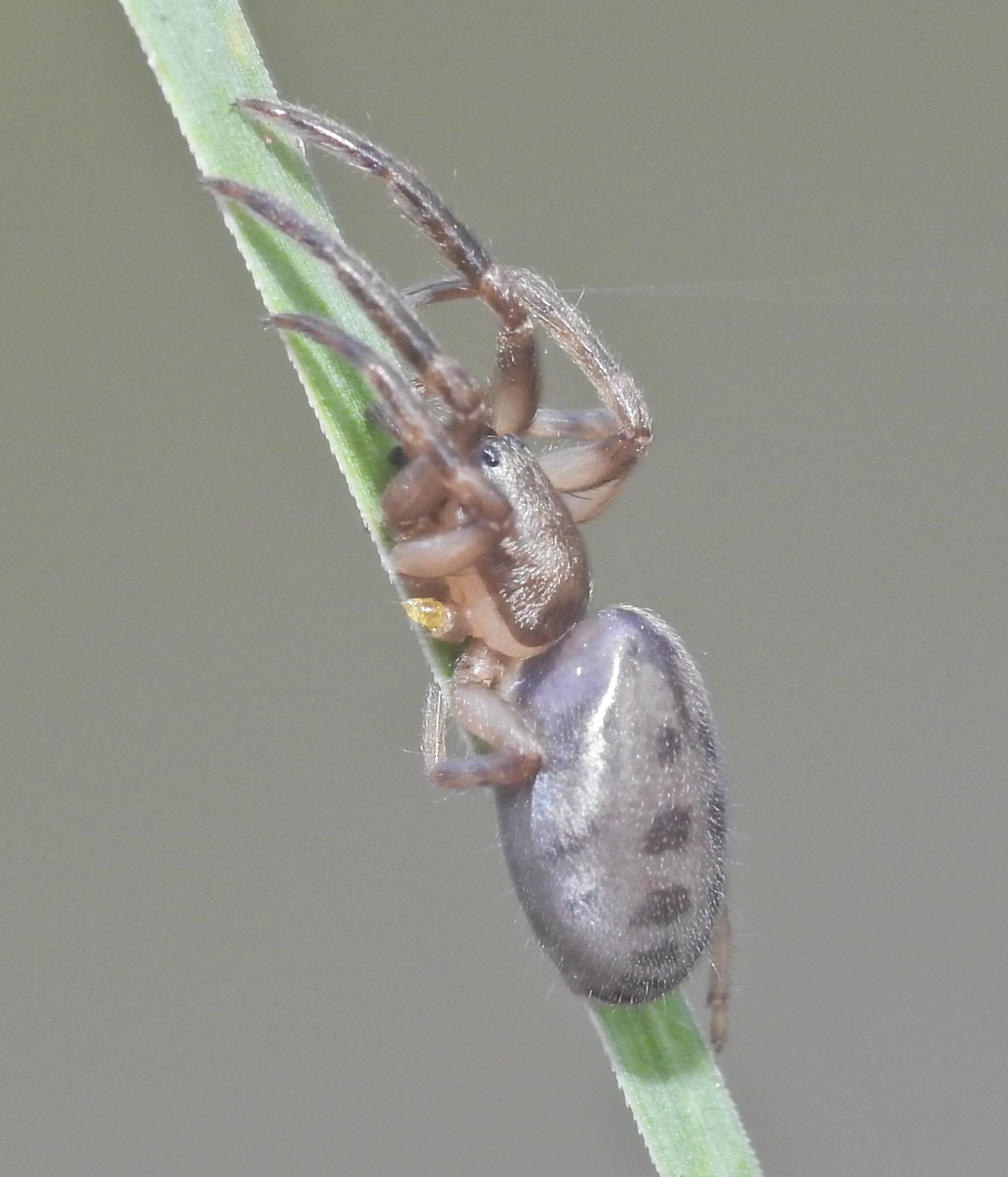
- G. robusta

Scientific classification
- Kingdom: Animalia
- Phylum: Arthropoda
- Subphylum: Chelicerata
- Class: Arachnida
- Order: Araneae
- Infraorder: Araneomorphae
- Family: Segestriidae
- Genus: Gippsicola; Hogg, 1900

Type species
- G. raleighi Hogg, 1900

Species
- 4, see text

= Gippsicola =

Genus of spiders

Gippsicola is a genus of Australian tube dwelling spiders that was first described by Henry Roughton Hogg in 1900. It is no longer considered a junior synonym of Segestria due to anatomical differences in the pedipalps of males and the receptaculum in females.

== Distribution ==
Species of this genus are found in New South Wales, Victoria, and Queensland.

== Species ==
As of October 2025, this genus includes four species:

- Gippsicola lineatus Giroti & Brescovit, 2017 – Australia (Queensland)
- Gippsicola minutus Giroti & Brescovit, 2017 – Australia (Queensland)
- Gippsicola raleighi Hogg, 1900 – Australia (Western, South, Victoria) (type species)
- Gippsicola robustus Giroti & Brescovit, 2017 – Australia (Queensland, New South Wales)
