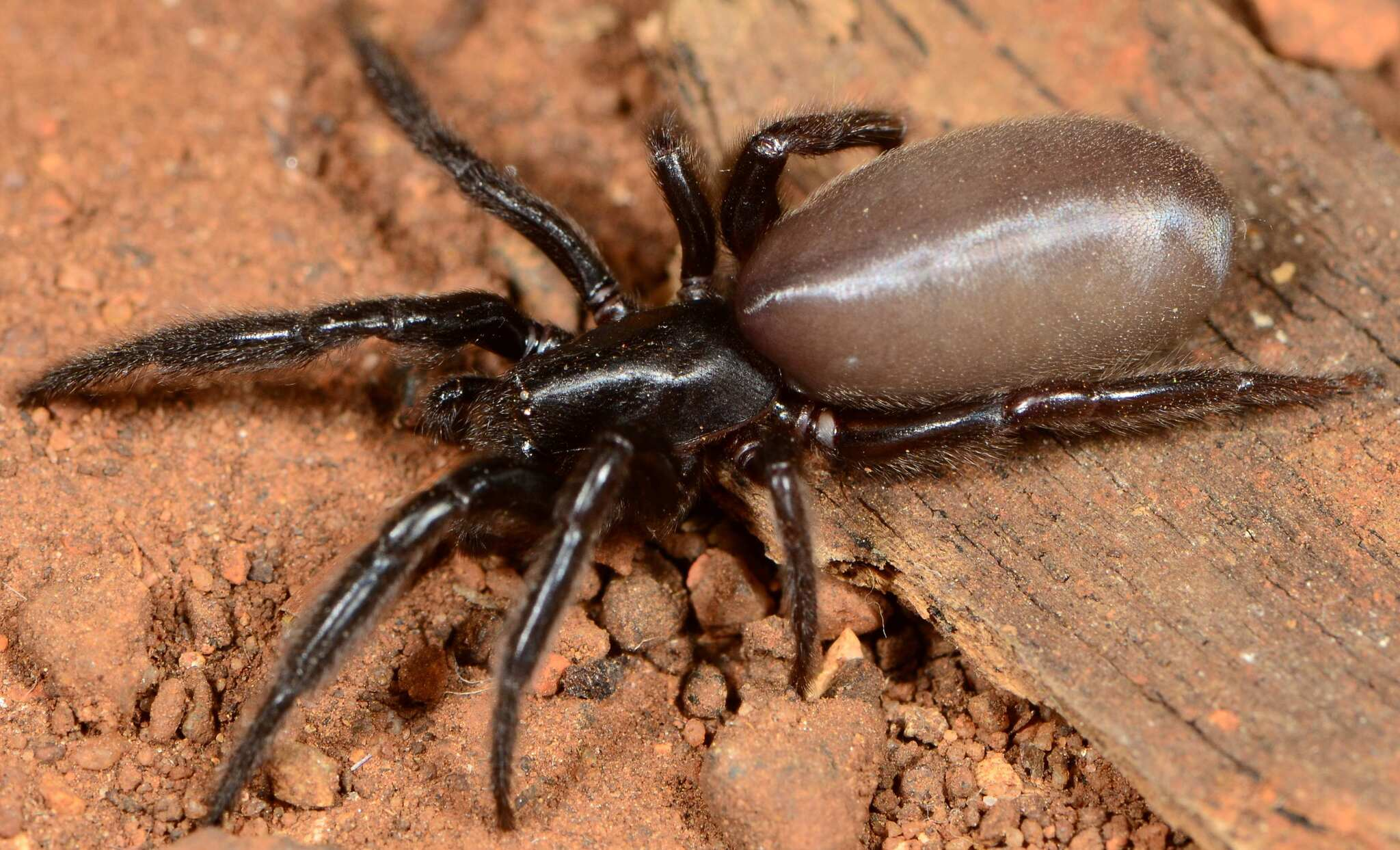
- Female A. bilineata
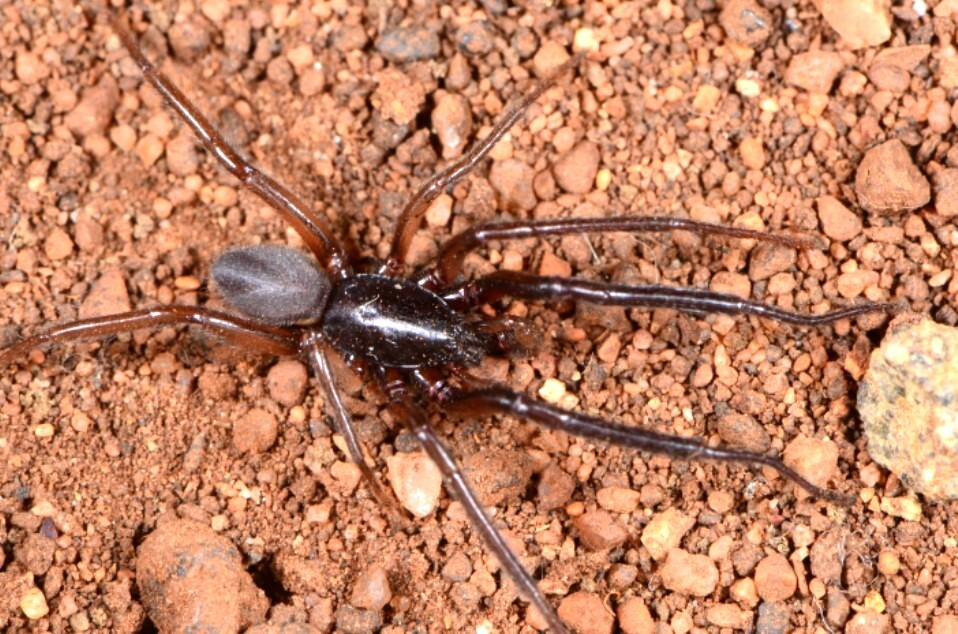
- Male A. corticola

Scientific classification
- Kingdom: Animalia
- Phylum: Arthropoda
- Subphylum: Chelicerata
- Class: Arachnida
- Order: Araneae
- Infraorder: Araneomorphae
- Family: Segestriidae
- Genus: Ariadna; Audouin, 1826

Type species
- Ariadna insidiatrix Audouin, 1826

Species
- 147, see text

= Ariadna =

Ariadna Temporal range: Cretaceous–present

Genus of spiders

Ariadna is a genus of tube-dwelling spider (family Segestriidae).

== Distribution ==
Ariadna are found on all continents except Antarctica. About a third of the species are endemic to Australia. Fifteen described species are endemic to South Africa. Less than ten species are found in Europe and North America, respectively.

== Behavior ==
Spiders in this genus are nocturnal.

=== Prey capture ===
The spiders are seen in the entrance of the tubes during the night with the tip of 6 legs visible on the rim of the tube. Prey movement is transmitted with vibrations to the spider from the radiating trip lines. The surprisingly swift reaction with which the spider strikes could be compared with that of a jack-in-the-box. The prey is seized and pulled instantly back into the tube. The double row of strong spines on the ventral surface of the front legs helps to grab and hold the prey. The third pair of legs directed forwards with legs I and II, help with the quick forward and backward movement of the spider in the tube. The entrance of the Ariadna tube has a small collar of very regular white silk. The trip lines have no adhesive elements and have only a signaling function.

== Description ==
The genus Ariadna comprises tube-web spiders with a body size ranging from 6-15 mm, with males similar in size to females. Body color varies from yellowish brown to reddish black to purplish black abdomens without patterns, or if patterns are present they consist of transverse bars. The carapace is longer than wide with the fovea appearing as a small depression and ranges from hirsute to glabrous.

The species of this genus have six eyes arranged in two rows, all pale in colour and positioned close to the clypeal edge. Chelicerae are free, long and slender with small fangs and a cheliceral furrow with few teeth. Endites are longer than wide and well developed. The labium is much longer than wide with a well-developed serrula arranged in a single row.

The abdomen is longer than wide, cylindrical and hairy with short spinnerets and contiguous anterior spinnerets. Legs are three-clawed with the third pair of legs directed forwards along with legs I and II. Front legs have a double row of spines ventrally. The genitalia are haplogyne.

== Taxonomy ==
The genus Ariadna was established by Jean Victor Audouin in 1826, with Ariadna insidiatrix Audouin, 1826 as the type species.

== Species ==
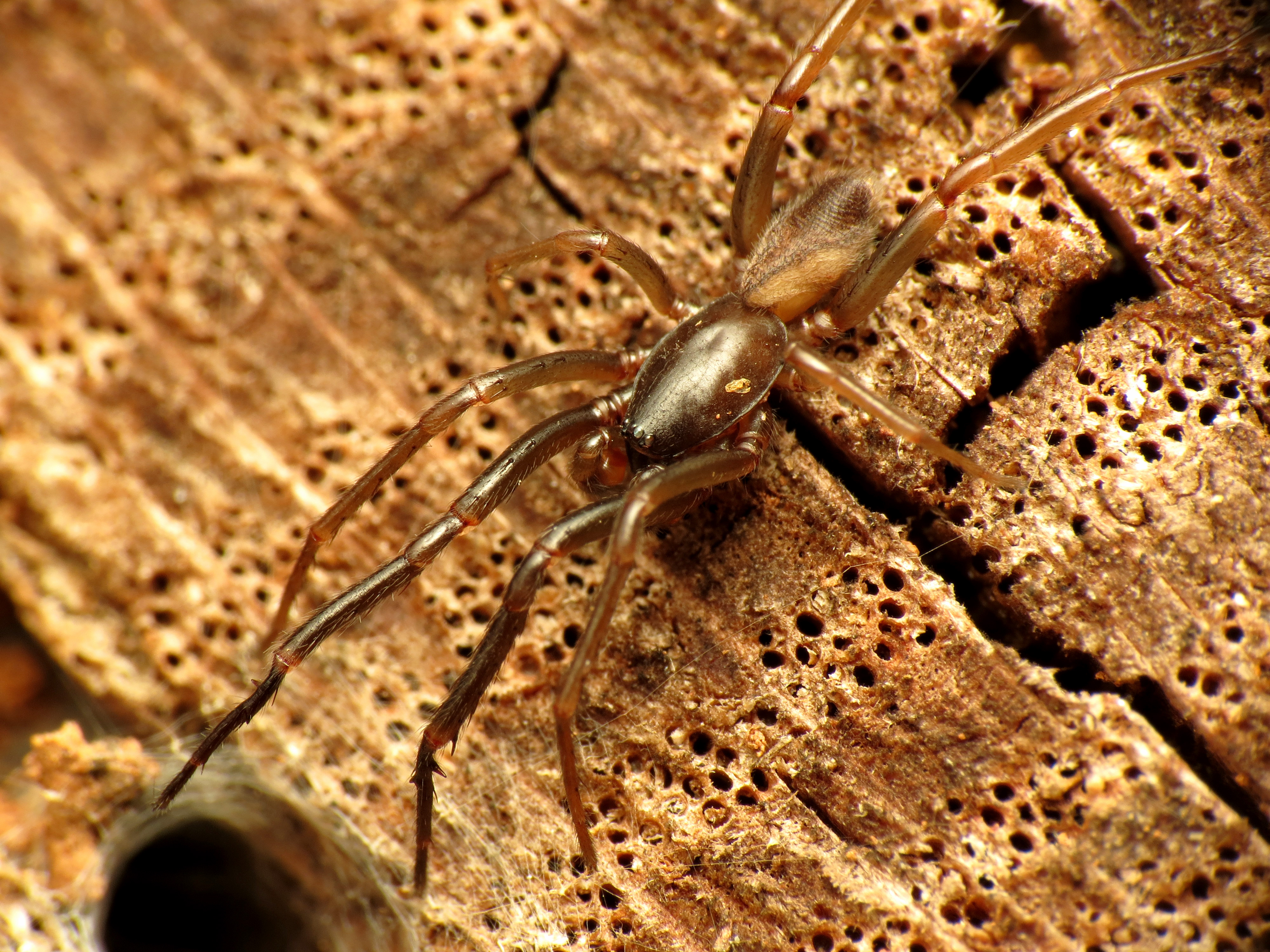
A. bicolor

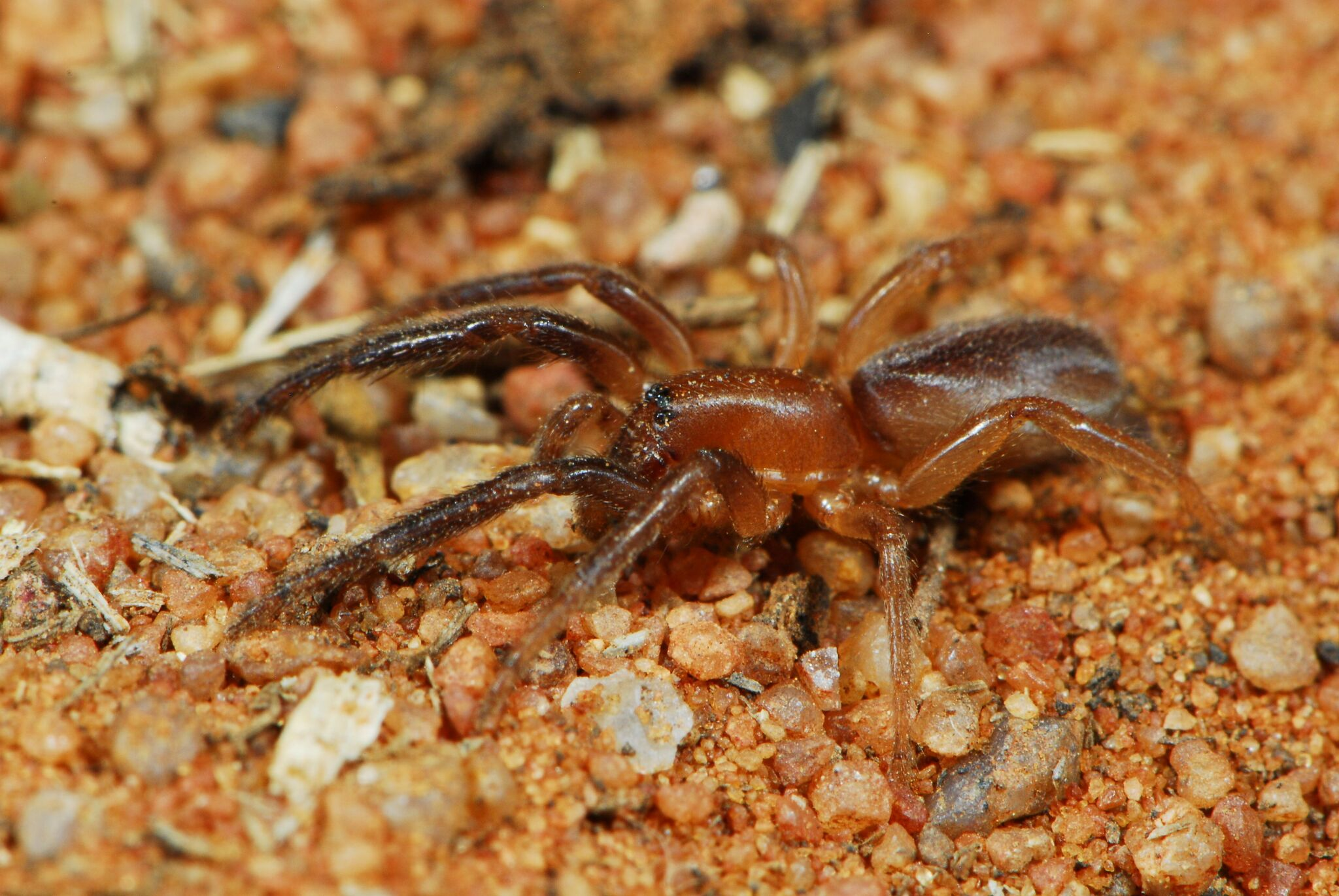
female A. jubata

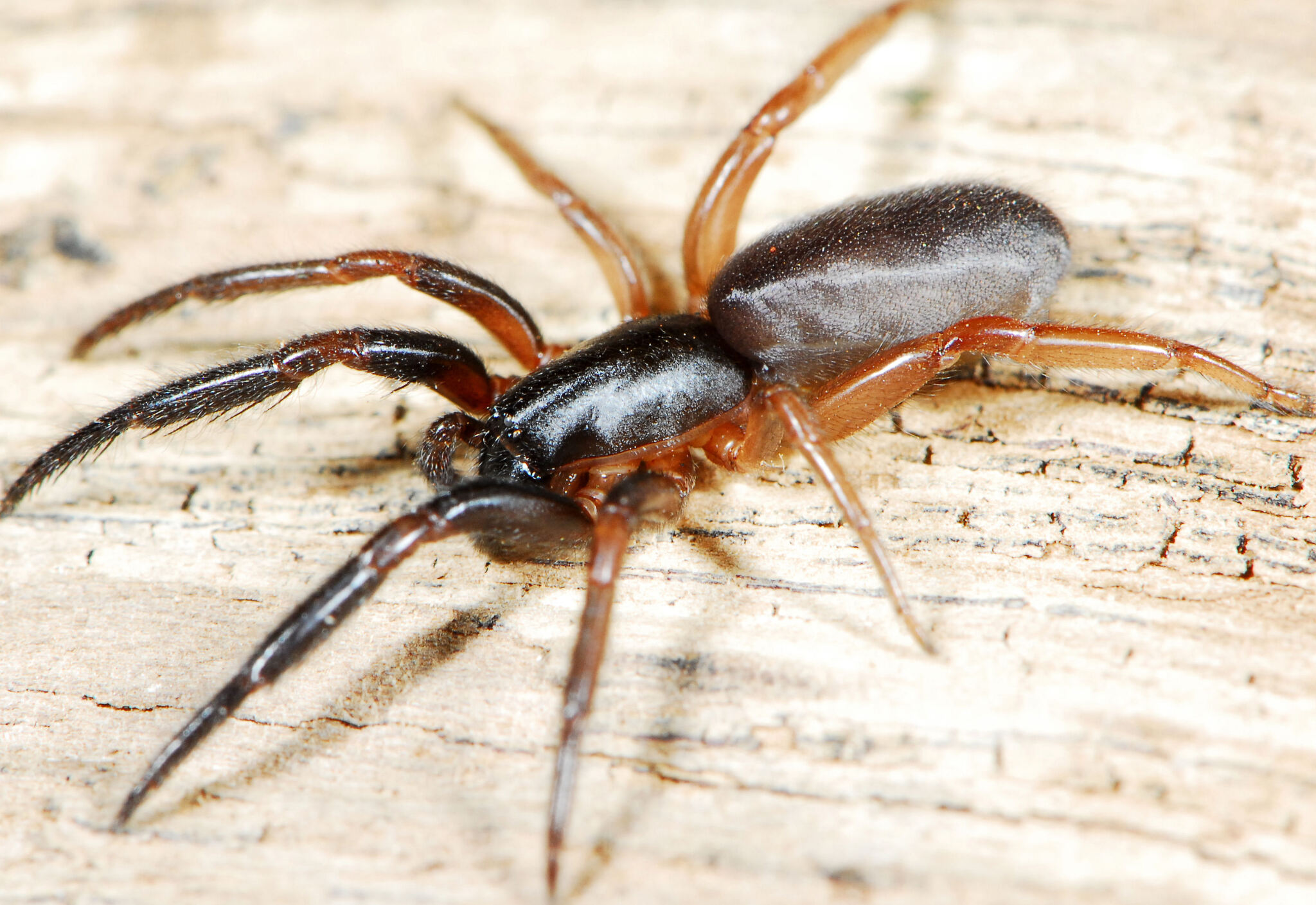
female A. umtalica

As of September 2025, this genus includes 147 species.

These species have articles on Wikipedia:

- Ariadna barbigera Simon, 1905 – New Zealand (Chatham Is.)
- Ariadna bellatoria Dalmas, 1917 – New Zealand
- Ariadna bicolor (Hentz, 1842) – United States, Mexico
- Ariadna bilineata Purcell, 1904 – South Africa
- Ariadna capensis Purcell, 1904 – South Africa
- Ariadna corticola Lawrence, 1952 – South Africa
- Ariadna dentigera Purcell, 1904 – South Africa
- Ariadna gryllotalpa (Purcell, 1904) – South Africa
- Ariadna hottentotta Purcell, 1908 – South Africa
- Ariadna inops Wunderlich, 2011 – Portugal, Spain
- Ariadna insularis Purcell, 1908 – Namibia, South Africa
- Ariadna jubata Purcell, 1904 – South Africa
- Ariadna karrooica Purcell, 1904 – South Africa
- Ariadna kolbei Purcell, 1904 – South Africa
- Ariadna lightfooti Purcell, 1904 – South Africa
- Ariadna oreades Simon, 1906 – Sri Lanka
- Ariadna scabripes Purcell, 1904 – South Africa
- Ariadna segestrioides Purcell, 1904 – South Africa
- Ariadna septemcincta (Urquhart, 1891) – New Zealand
- Ariadna similis Purcell, 1908 – South Africa
- Ariadna taprobanica Simon, 1906 – Sri Lanka
- Ariadna umtalica Purcell, 1904 – Botswana, Zimbabwe, South Africa
- Ariadna ustulata Simon, 1898 – Seychelles

Complete list of species as of September 2025
- Ariadna abbreviata Marsh, Stevens & Framenau, 2022 – Australia (Tasmania)
- Ariadna abrilae Grismado, 2008 – Chile
- Ariadna algarvensis Wunderlich, 2011 – Portugal
- Ariadna alta Marsh, Stevens & Framenau, 2022 – Australia (Tasmania)
- Ariadna amabilia Marsh, Stevens & Framenau, 2022 – Australia (Tasmania)
- Ariadna amandahorta Wunderlich, 2024 – Portugal
- Ariadna araucana Grismado, 2008 – Chile
- Ariadna arenacea Marsh, Stevens, Bradford & Framenau, 2022 – Australia (South Australia)
- Ariadna arthuri Petrunkevitch, 1926 – United States, Caribbean
- Ariadna aurea Giroti & Brescovit, 2018 – Brazil
- Ariadna barbigera Simon, 1905 – New Zealand (Chatham Is.)
- Ariadna bellatoria Dalmas, 1917 – New Zealand
- Ariadna bellatula Marsh, Stevens, Bradford & Framenau, 2022 – Australia (South Australia)
- Ariadna bicolor (Hentz, 1842) – United States, Mexico
- Ariadna bilineata Purcell, 1904 – South Africa
- Ariadna boesenbergi Keyserling, 1877 – Brazil, Uruguay, Argentina
- Ariadna boliviana Simon, 1907 – Bolivia, Suriname, Brazil, Paraguay
- Ariadna brevispina Caporiacco, 1947 – Tanzania
- Ariadna brignolii Wunderlich, 2011 – Italy
- Ariadna burchelli (Hogg, 1900) – Australia (Victoria)
- Ariadna caerulea Keyserling, 1877 – Colombia, Ecuador
- Ariadna calilegua Grismado, 2008 – Argentina
- Ariadna canariensis Wunderlich, 1995 – Canary Islands
- Ariadna caparao Giroti & Brescovit, 2018 – Brazil
- Ariadna capensis Purcell, 1904 – South Africa
- Ariadna cephalotes Simon, 1907 – Peru, Bolivia, Argentina
- Ariadna changellkuk Grismado, 2008 – Chile
- Ariadna chayu Wang & Zhang, 2022 – China
- Ariadna chhotae Siliwal & Yadav, 2017 – India
- Ariadna clavata Marsh, Baehr, Glatz & Framenau, 2018 – Australia (South Australia)
- Ariadna comata O. Pickard-Cambridge, 1898 – Mexico
- Ariadna corticola Lawrence, 1952 – South Africa
- Ariadna crassipalpus (Blackwall, 1863) – Brazil
- Ariadna crypticola Marsh, Stevens & Framenau, 2022 – Australia (Tasmania)
- Ariadna curvata Marsh, Stevens, Bradford & Framenau, 2022 – Australia (South Australia)
- Ariadna cyprusensis Wunderlich, 2011 – Cyprus, Greece (Kos)
- Ariadna daweiensis Yin, Xu & Bao, 2002 – China
- Ariadna decatetracantha Main, 1954 – Australia (Western Australia)
- Ariadna dentigera Purcell, 1904 – South Africa
- Ariadna deserta Marsh, Stevens, Bradford & Framenau, 2022 – Australia (South Australia)
- Ariadna dissimilis Berland, 1924 – New Caledonia
- Ariadna diucrura Marsh, Stevens, Bradford & Framenau, 2022 – Australia (South Australia)
- Ariadna dysderina L. Koch, 1873 – Australia (Queensland)
- Ariadna elaphros Wang, 1993 – China
- Ariadna europaensis Wunderlich, 2011 – Italy
- Ariadna exuviaque Wunderlich, 2011 – Spain (Balearic Is.)
- Ariadna ferrogrisea Marsh, Stevens & Framenau, 2022 – Australia (Tasmania)
- Ariadna flavescens Marsh, Stevens, Bradford & Framenau, 2022 – Australia (South Australia)
- Ariadna formosa Marsh, Stevens, Bradford & Framenau, 2022 – Australia (South Australia)
- Ariadna fragilis Marsh, Stevens & Framenau, 2022 – Australia (Tasmania)
- Ariadna gallica Wunderlich, 2012 – France
- Ariadna gaucha Giroti & Brescovit, 2018 – Brazil
- Ariadna gonzo Marsh, Stevens & Framenau, 2022 – Australia (Tasmania)
- Ariadna gryllotalpa (Purcell, 1904) – South Africa
- Ariadna hottentotta Purcell, 1908 – South Africa
- Ariadna inflata Marsh, Stevens, Bradford & Framenau, 2022 – Australia (South Australia)
- Ariadna inops Wunderlich, 2011 – Portugal, Spain
- Ariadna insidiatrix Audouin, 1826 – Mediterranean (type species)
- Ariadna insula Marsh, Stevens, Bradford & Framenau, 2022 – Australia (South Australia)
- Ariadna insularis Purcell, 1908 – Namibia, South Africa
- Ariadna insulicola Yaginuma, 1967 – China, Korea, Japan
- Ariadna ionica O. Pickard-Cambridge, 1873 – Greece
- Ariadna ipojuca Giroti & Brescovit, 2018 – Brazil
- Ariadna isthmica Beatty, 1970 – Costa Rica, Nicaragua, Panama, Brazil
- Ariadna javana Kulczyński, 1911 – Indonesia (Java)
- Ariadna jiuzhaigou Wang & Zhang, 2022 – China
- Ariadna jubata Purcell, 1904 – South Africa
- Ariadna karrooica Purcell, 1904 – South Africa
- Ariadna kibonotensis Tullgren, 1910 – Tanzania
- Ariadna kisanganensis Benoit, 1974 – DR Congo
- Ariadna kiwirrkurra Baehr & Whyte, 2016 – Australia (Western Australia)
- Ariadna kolbei Purcell, 1904 – South Africa
- Ariadna laeta Thorell, 1899 – Cameroon, São Tomé and Príncipe
- Ariadna lalen Giroti & Brescovit, 2018 – Chile
- Ariadna lateralis Karsch, 1881 – China, Korea, Taiwan, Japan
- Ariadna lebronneci Berland, 1933 – Marquesas Islands
- Ariadna lemosi Giroti & Brescovit, 2018 – Brazil
- Ariadna levii Grismado, 2008 – Chile
- Ariadna levyi Wunderlich, 2011 – Israel
- Ariadna lightfooti Purcell, 1904 – South Africa
- Ariadna maderiana Warburton, 1892 – Madeira, Salvages
- Ariadna major Hickman, 1929 – Australia (Tasmania)
- Ariadna maroccana Wunderlich, 2011 – Morocco
- Ariadna masculina Lawrence, 1928 – Namibia
- Ariadna maxima (Nicolet, 1849) – Chile, Argentina, Juan Fernandez Islands
- Ariadna mbalensis Lessert, 1933 – Angola
- Ariadna meruensis Tullgren, 1910 – Tanzania
- Ariadna mollis (Holmberg, 1876) – Brazil, Uruguay, Argentina
- Ariadna molur Siliwal & Yadav, 2017 – India
- Ariadna montana Rainbow, 1920 – Australia (Lord Howe Is.)
- Ariadna monticola Thorell, 1897 – Myanmar
- Ariadna motumotirohiva Giroti, Cotoras, Lazo & Brescovit, 2020 – Chile
- Ariadna multispinosa Bryant, 1948 – Dominican Rep.
- Ariadna muscosa Hickman, 1929 – Australia (Tasmania)
- Ariadna natalis Pocock, 1900 – Australia (Christmas Is.)
- Ariadna nebulosa Simon, 1906 – India
- Ariadna neocaledonica Berland, 1924 – New Caledonia
- Ariadna obscura (Blackwall, 1858) – Peru, Brazil
- Ariadna octospinata (Lamb, 1911) – Australia (Queensland)
- Ariadna oreades Simon, 1906 – Sri Lanka
- Ariadna orientalis Dönitz & Strand, 1906 – Japan
- Ariadna otwayensis Marsh, Stevens, Bradford & Framenau, 2022 – Australia (Victoria)
- Ariadna papuana Kulczyński, 1911 – Indonesia (New Guinea)
- Ariadna pectinella Strand, 1913 – DR Congo
- Ariadna pelios Wang, 1993 – China
- Ariadna perkinsi Simon, 1900 – Hawaii
- Ariadna phantasma Marsh, Hudson & Framenau, 2021 – Australia (Western Australia)
- Ariadna pilifera O. Pickard-Cambridge, 1898 – United States, Mexico
- Ariadna pollex Marsh, Stevens, Bradford & Framenau, 2022 – Australia (South Australia)
- Ariadna propria Marsh, Stevens, Bradford & Framenau, 2022 – Australia (South Australia)
- Ariadna pulchripes Purcell, 1908 – Namibia
- Ariadna rapinatrix Thorell, 1899 – Cameroon, São Tomé and Príncipe
- Ariadna reginae Giroti & Brescovit, 2018 – Mexico, Guatemala, Belize, Costa Rica
- Ariadna rutila Marsh, Stevens, Bradford & Framenau, 2022 – Australia (South Australia)
- Ariadna ruwenzorica Strand, 1913 – DR Congo
- Ariadna sansibarica Strand, 1907 – Tanzania (Zanzibar)
- Ariadna scabripes Purcell, 1904 – South Africa
- Ariadna segestrioides Purcell, 1904 – South Africa
- Ariadna segmentata Simon, 1893 – Australia (Tasmania)
- Ariadna septemcincta (Urquhart, 1891) – New Zealand
- Ariadna similis Purcell, 1908 – South Africa
- Ariadna simplex Marsh, Stevens, Bradford & Framenau, 2022 – Australia (South Australia)
- Ariadna sinuosa Marsh, Stevens, Bradford & Framenau, 2022 – Australia (Victoria)
- Ariadna snellemanni (van Hasselt, 1882) – Indonesia (Sumatra, Krakatau), Philippines
- Ariadna spinosa Marsh, Stevens, Bradford & Framenau, 2022 – Australia (South Australia)
- Ariadna subnubila Marsh, Stevens & Framenau, 2022 – Australia (Tasmania)
- Ariadna subplana Marsh, Stevens, Bradford & Framenau, 2022 – Australia (South Australia)
- Ariadna tangara Marsh, Baehr, Glatz & Framenau, 2018 – Australia (South Australia, Victoria, Tasmania)
- Ariadna taprobanica Simon, 1906 – Sri Lanka
- Ariadna tarsalis Banks, 1902 – Peru, Ecuador, Galapagos
- Ariadna thylacinus Marsh, Stevens & Framenau, 2022 – Australia (Tasmania)
- Ariadna thyrianthina Simon, 1908 – Australia (Western Australia)
- Ariadna tigrina Marsh, Stevens & Framenau, 2022 – Australia (Tasmania)
- Ariadna tovarensis Simon, 1893 – Venezuela
- Ariadna tria Marsh, Stevens, Bradford & Framenau, 2022 – Australia (Victoria)
- Ariadna ubajara Giroti & Brescovit, 2018 – Brazil
- Ariadna umbra Marsh, Stevens, Bradford & Framenau, 2022 – Australia (South Australia)
- Ariadna umtalica Purcell, 1904 – Botswana, Zimbabwe, South Africa
- Ariadna una Marsh, Stevens, Bradford & Framenau, 2022 – Australia (South Australia)
- Ariadna uncinata Tang, Li & Yang, 2019 – China
- Ariadna ungua Marsh, Stevens, Bradford & Framenau, 2022 – Australia (South Australia)
- Ariadna ustulata Simon, 1898 – Seychelles
- Ariadna valida Marsh, Stevens, Bradford & Framenau, 2022 – Australia (South Australia)
- Ariadna vansda Siliwal, Yadav & Kumar, 2017 – India
- Ariadna weaveri Beatty, 1970 – Mexico
- Ariadna woinarskii Marsh, Stevens, Bradford & Framenau, 2022 – Australia (South Australia)
- Ariadna yintiaoling Wang & Zhang, 2022 – China
