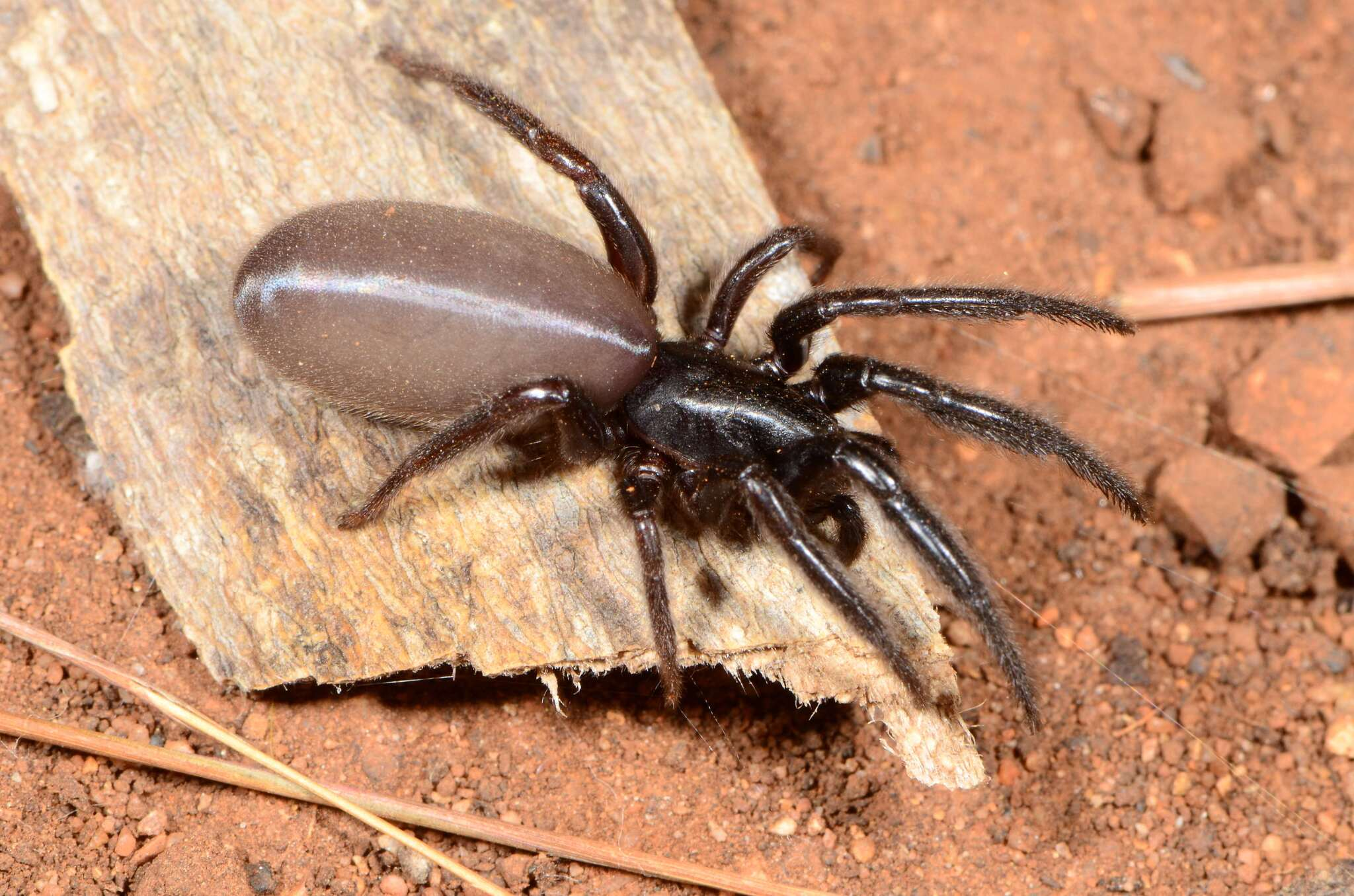
- Female
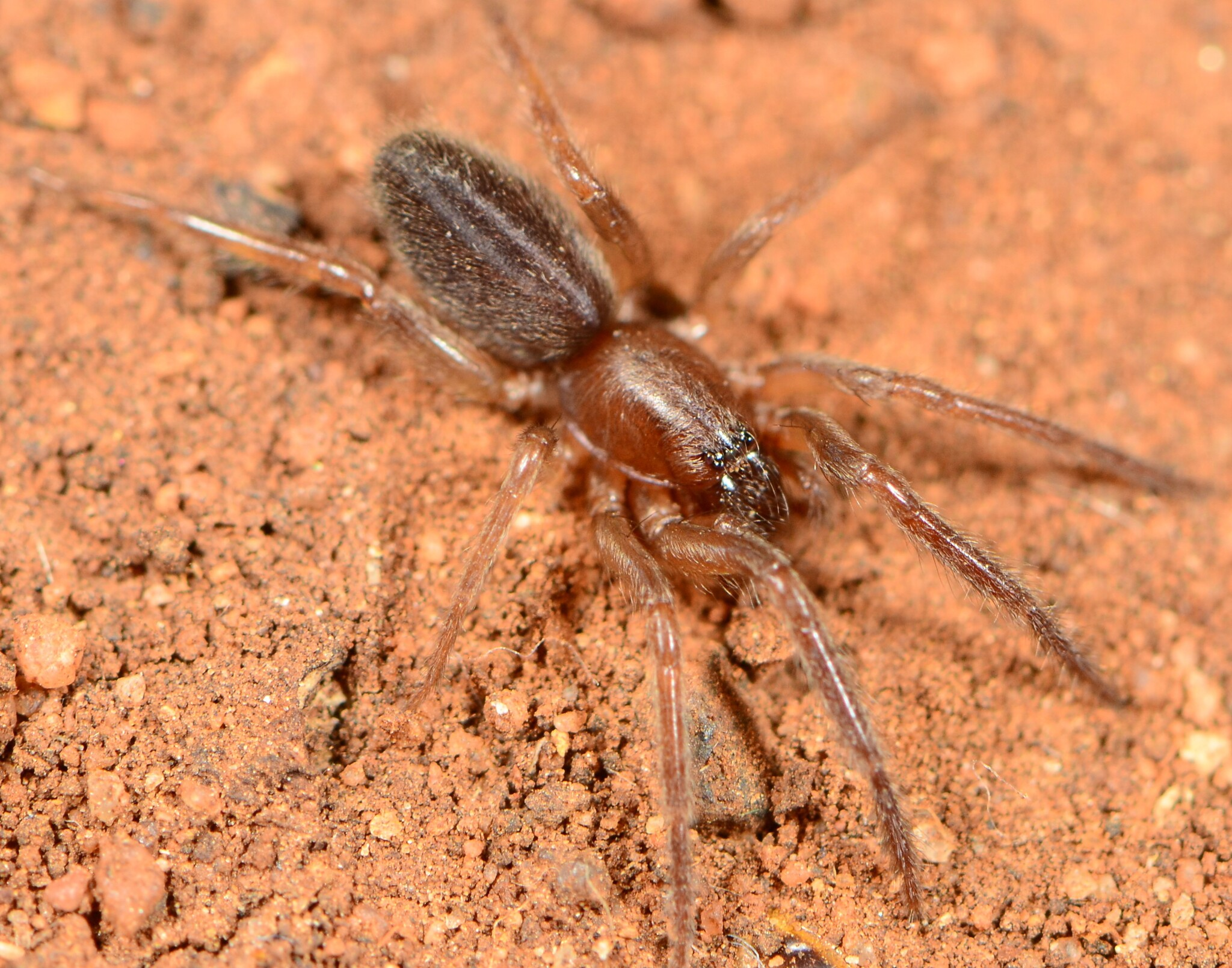
- Juvenile female

Scientific classification
- Kingdom: Animalia
- Phylum: Arthropoda
- Subphylum: Chelicerata
- Class: Arachnida
- Order: Araneae
- Infraorder: Araneomorphae
- Family: Segestriidae
- Genus: Ariadna
- Species: A. bilineata

Binomial name
- Ariadna bilineata Purcell, 1904

= Ariadna bilineata =

Side-striped Tube-Web Spider

Species of spider

Ariadna bilineata is a species of spider in the family Segestriidae. It is endemic to South Africa and is commonly known as the Signal Hill tube-web spider or side-striped tube-web spider.

== Distribution ==
Ariadna bilineata has a wide distribution across four South African provinces, Gauteng, Limpopo, North West, and Western Cape. The species occurs at altitudes ranging from 5 to 1,397 m above sea level. Notable locations include Table Mountain National Park, Blouberg Nature Reserve, and Faerie Glen Nature Reserve.

== Habitat and ecology ==
The species inhabits multiple biomes including Fynbos and Savanna biomes. Like other members of its genus, it constructs tube signal-webs made in crevices of walls, rocks, fallen tree trunks, or bark of trees. The spider is nocturnal and can be observed at the entrance of its tube during the night with the tips of six legs visible on the rim of the tube.

== Description ==
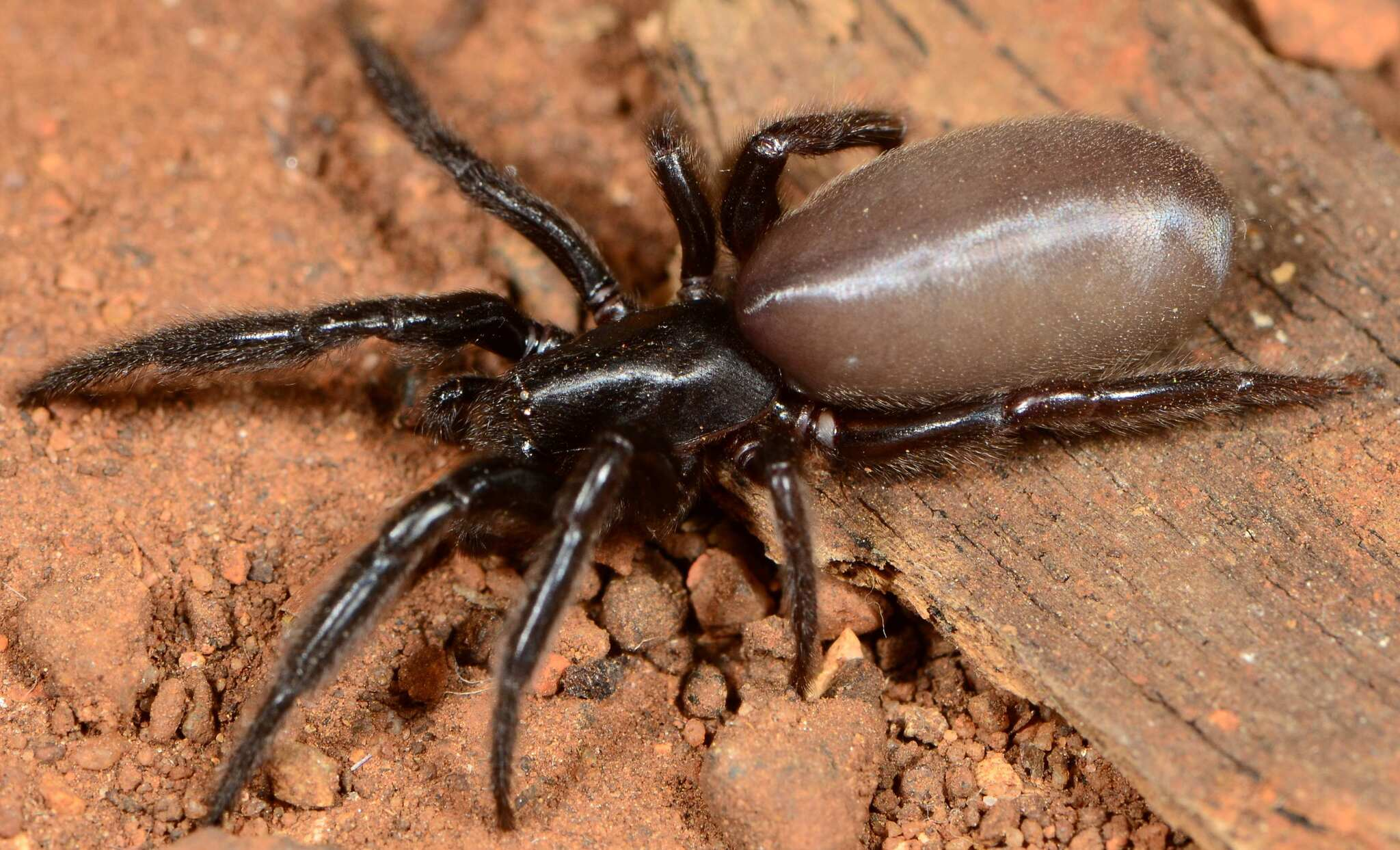
female

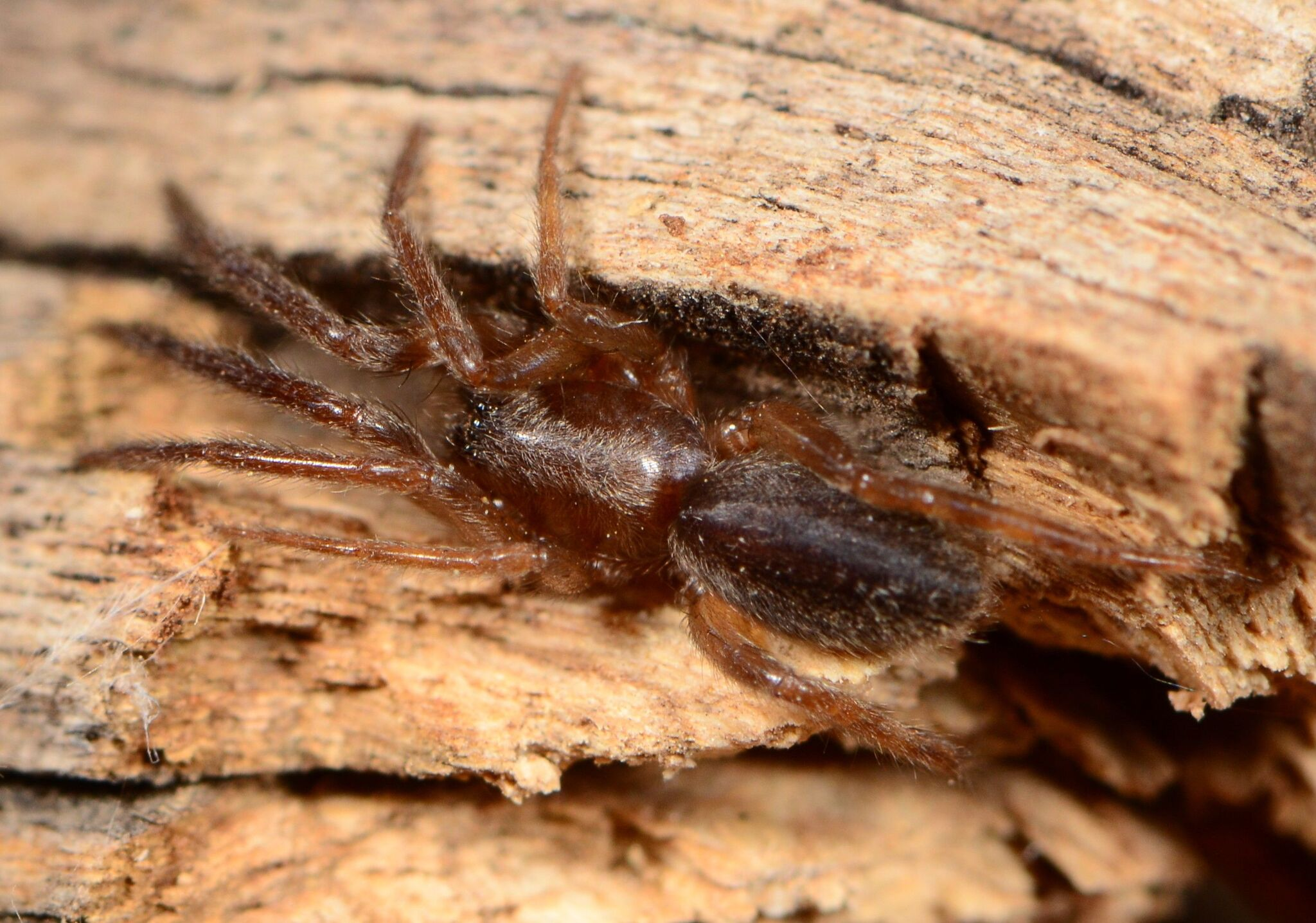
juvenile female

Females have a reddish-yellow to dark reddish-brown carapace, darker anteriorly, with a hairy surface usually finely veined with black. The chelicerae are yellowish-red to black. The abdomen has a fine, pale yellow line running from end to end down the middle. Legs are faintly or strongly infuscated, with the anterior pairs darker than the posterior ones. Total length ranges from 6-7.5 mm. Males remain undescribed.

== Conservation ==
Ariadna bilineata is listed as Least Concern by the South African National Biodiversity Institute due to its wide geographical range. The species is protected in several conservation areas including Faerie Glen Nature Reserve, Blouberg Nature Reserve, Ben Lavin Nature Reserve, and Table Mountain National Park.

== Taxonomy ==
The species was originally described by W. F. Purcell in 1904 from Signal Hill in Table Mountain National Park, Western Cape. The South African Ariadna species have not been taxonomically revised, and this species is known only from the female sex.
