= Indoseges =

Scientific classification
- Kingdom: Animalia
- Phylum: Arthropoda
- Subphylum: Chelicerata
- Class: Arachnida
- Order: Araneae
- Infraorder: Araneomorphae
- Family: Segestriidae
- Genus: Indoseges; Siliwal, Das, Choudhury & Giroti, 2021

Type species
- I. malkangiri Choudhury, Siliwal, Das & Giroti, 2021

Species
- 5, see text

Genus of spiders

Indoseges is a genus of south Asian tube dwelling spiders. It was first described by S. R. Choudhury, Manju Siliwal and S. K. Das in 2021, and it has only been found in India.

== Species ==
As of April 2022 it contains five species:

- I. chilika Siliwal, Das, Choudhury & Giroti, 2021 – India
- I. malkangiri Choudhury, Siliwal, Das & Giroti, 2021 (type) – India
- I. narayani Choudhury, Siliwal, Das & Giroti, 2021 – India
- I. satkosia Das, Siliwal, Choudhury & Giroti, 2021 – India
- I. sushildutta Siliwal, Das, Choudhury, & Giroti, 2021 – India
