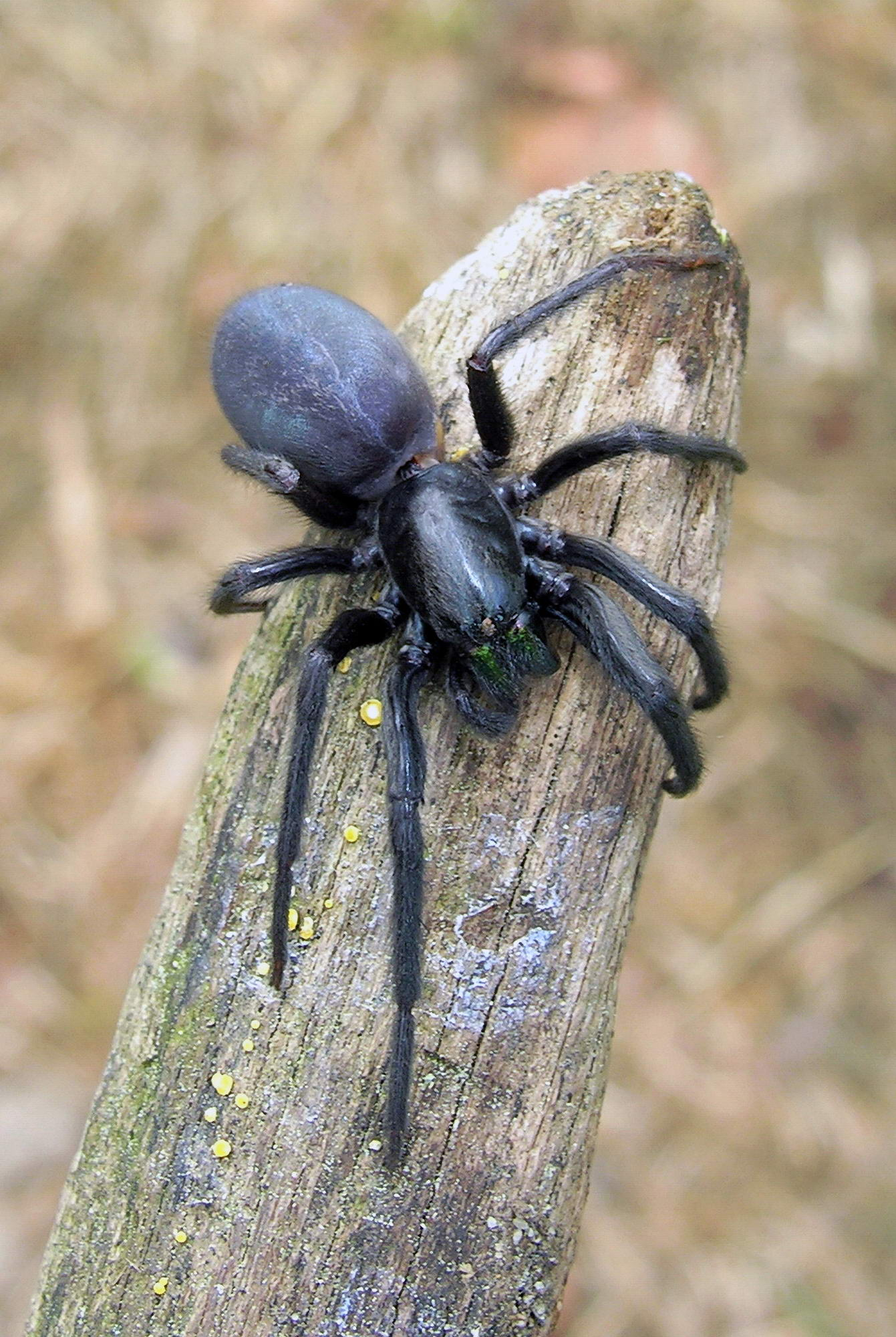
- Segestria florentina
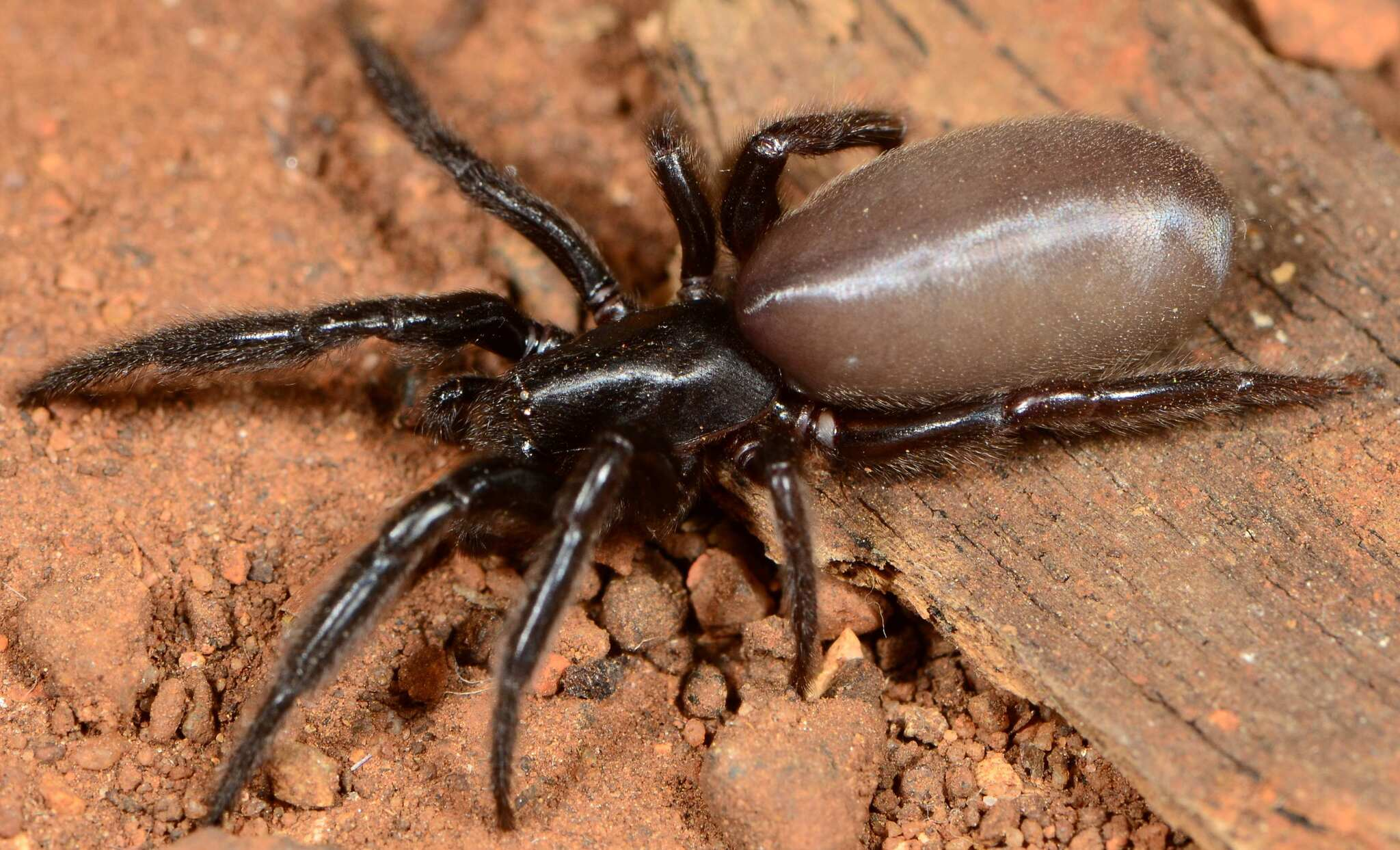
- Ariadna bilineata from South Africa

Scientific classification
- Kingdom: Animalia
- Phylum: Arthropoda
- Subphylum: Chelicerata
- Class: Arachnida
- Order: Araneae
- Infraorder: Araneomorphae
- Family: Segestriidae; Simon, 1893

Diversity
- 5 genera, 181 species
- blue: reported countries (WSC) green: observation hotspots (iNaturalist)

= Tube-dwelling spider =

Tube-dwelling spiders Temporal range: Eocene–present

Family of spiders

Tube-dwelling spiders (Segestriidae) are a family of araneomorph spiders first described by Eugène Simon in 1893. It consists of five genera: two large and widespread, Segestria and Ariadna, and three smaller genera, Citharoceps, Gippsicola and Indoseges. They are haplogyne spiders, related to the Dysderidae and placed in clade or superfamily Dysderoidea.

== Distribution ==
Both Segestria and Ariadna live in North America, South America, Eurasia, Africa and New Zealand, though Ariadna also lives in Australia.

== Description ==
Members of this family are easily recognized because their first three pairs of legs are arranged forward instead of two and they have six eyes instead of eight, arranged in a semicircle. The leg structure appears to be an adaptation for living in silken tubes. Unlike those of the atypical tarantulas, these tubes may branch and are often built in tree bark fissures, as well as under stones.

== Genera ==
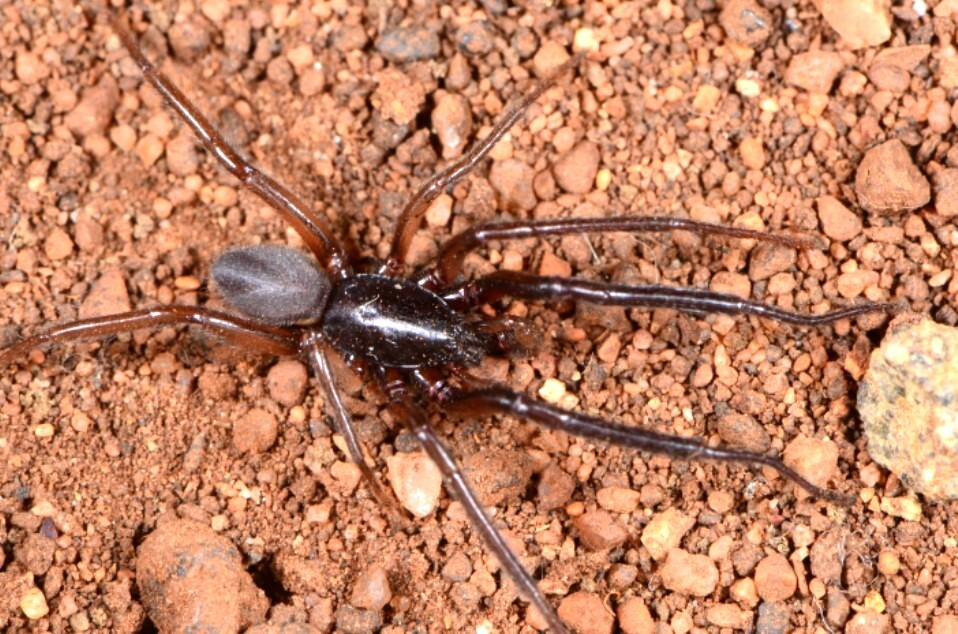
male Ariadna corticola

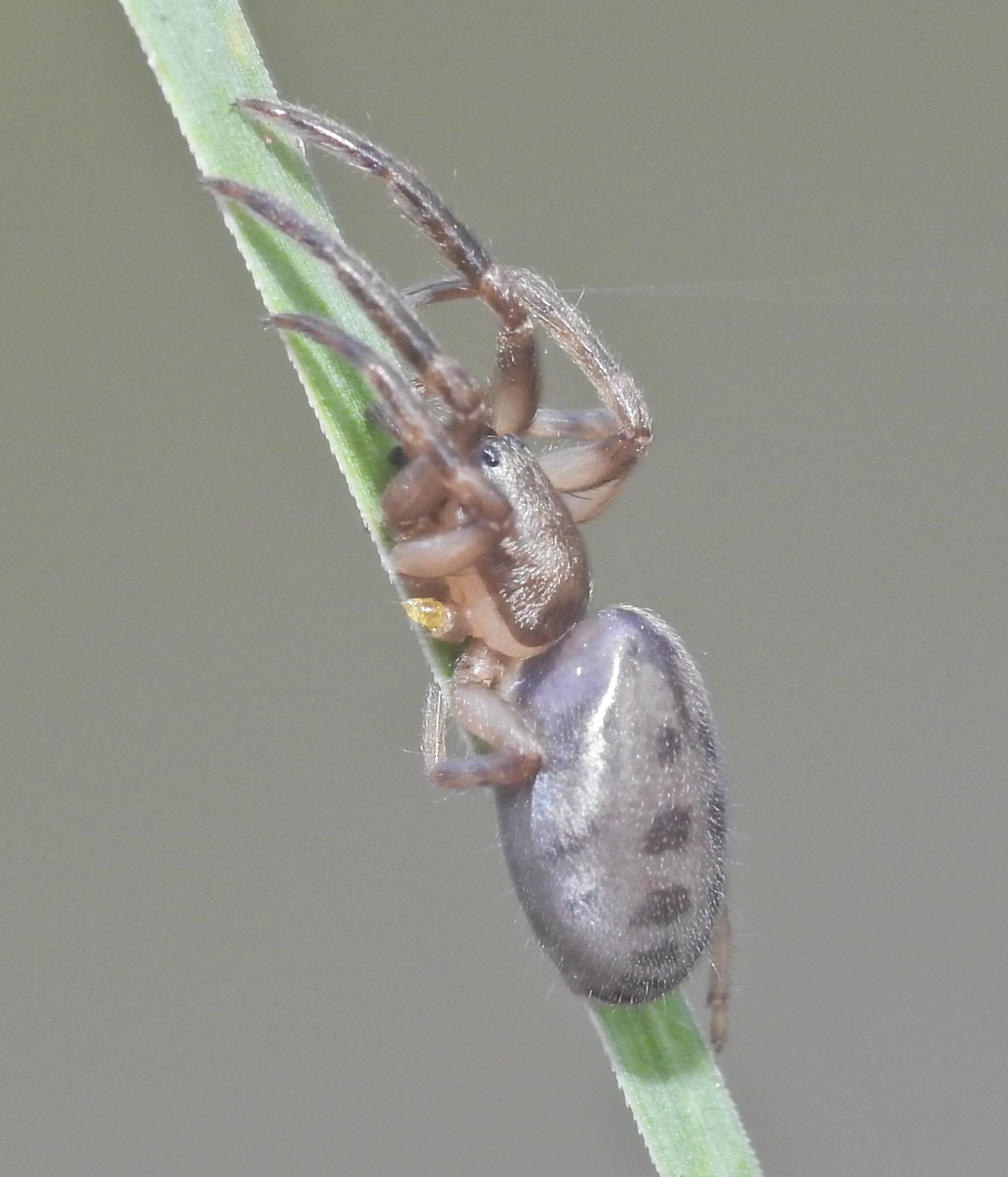
Gippsicola robusta

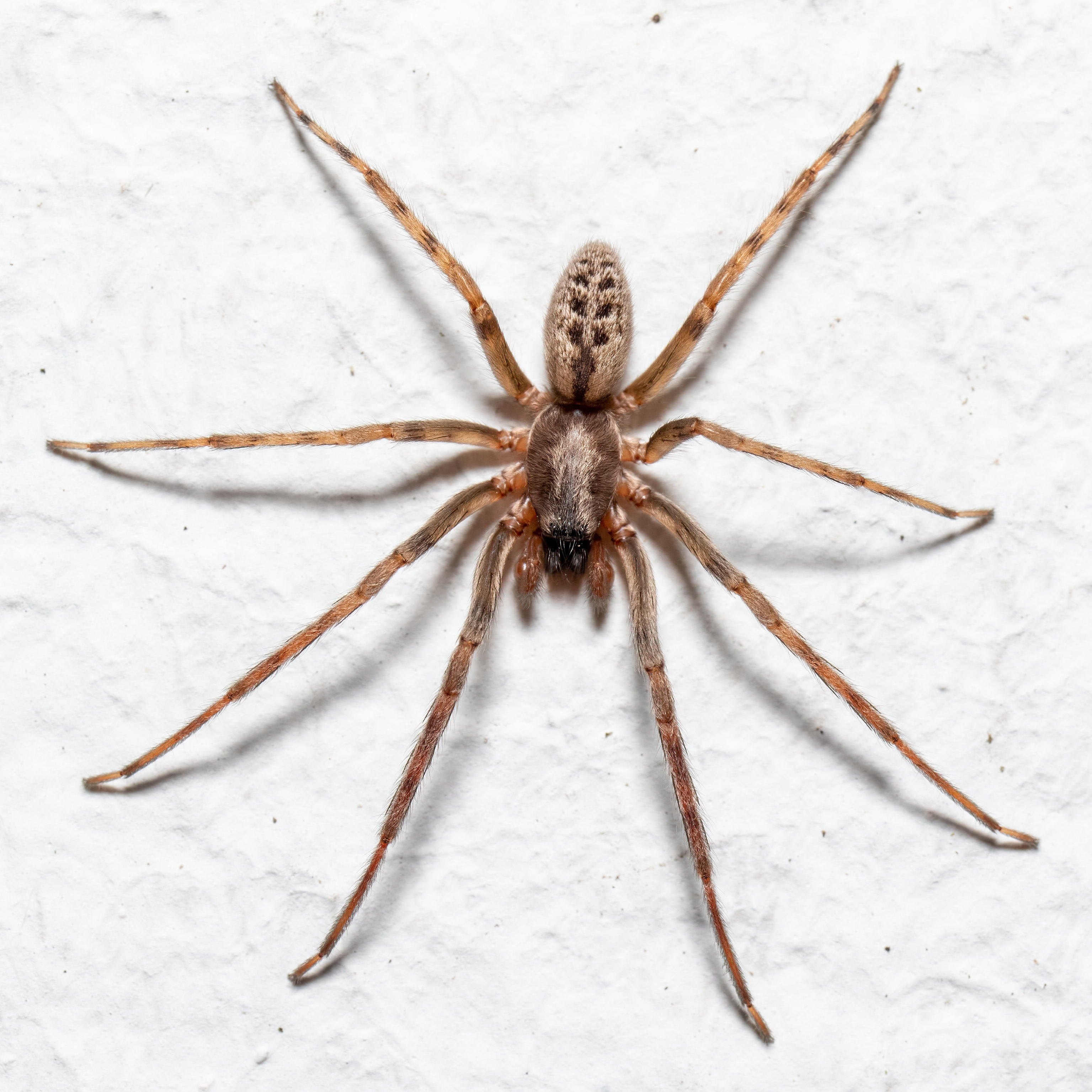
male Segestria bavarica

As of January 2026, this family includes five genera and 181 species:

- Ariadna Audouin, 1826 – Africa, Asia, Europe, North to South America, Australia, New Caledonia, New Zealand
- Citharoceps Chamberlin, 1924 – Mexico, United States
- Gippsicola Hogg, 1900 – Australia
- Indoseges Siliwal, Das, Choudhury & Giroti, 2021 – India
- Segestria Latreille, 1804 – Madagascar, Asia, Europe, North America, New Zealand, northern Africa. Introduced to St. Helena, Argentina, Brazil, Uruguay

=== Fossil record ===
The oldest unambiguous members of the family are known from the Eocene Baltic amber.

Cretaceous taxa Denticulsegestria, Jordansegestria, Jordariadna, Lebansegestria, Microsegestria, Myansegestria, Palaeosegestria and Parvosegestria, originally described as tube-dwelling spiders, might be members of the stem group of Segestriidae or stem dysderoids instead.
