= Dipogon =

Dipogon may refer to:

- Dipogon (wasp), a genus of spider wasps
- Dipogon (plant), a genus of plants of the family Fabaceae
