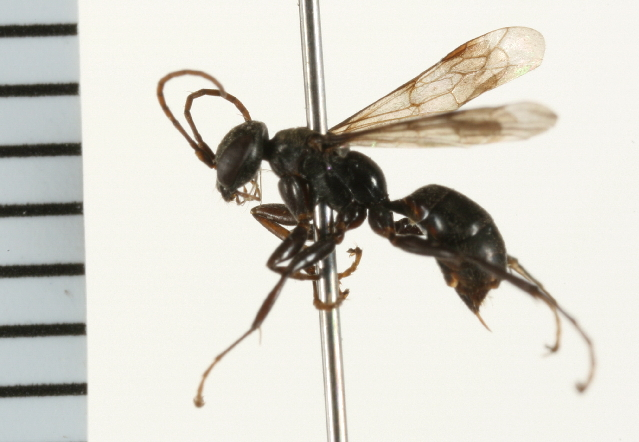
- Dipogon brevis

Scientific classification
- Kingdom: Animalia
- Phylum: Arthropoda
- Class: Insecta
- Order: Hymenoptera
- Family: Pompilidae
- Tribe: Deuterageniini
- Genus: Dipogon; Fox, 1897

Type species
- Dipogon populator Fox, 1897

= Dipogon (wasp) =

Genus of wasps

Dipogon is a genus of spider wasps of the family Pompilidae in the subfamily Pepsinae. They are found in Europe, Asia, and North America. Their generic name ("two beards") comes from the characteristic long bristle tufts just below the mandibles, which are used to carry material to construct the cells in the nest, and for constructing the nest.

== Species ==
Species in Dipogon include:

- Dipogon anasazi Evans, 2000
- Dipogon brevis (Cresson, 1867)
- Dipogon diablo Wasbauer, 1960
- Dipogon graenicheri Banks, 1939
- Dipogon kiowa Evans, 2000
- Dipogon konza Evans, 2000
- Dipogon leechi Wasbauer, 1960
- Dipogon lignicolus Evans, 1987
- Dipogon moctezuma Evans, 1987
- Dipogon paludis Townes, 1957
- Dipogon parkeri Wasbauer, 1966
- Dipogon populator Fox, 1897
- Dipogon pygmaeus Townes, 1957
- Dipogon texanus Banks, 1944

=== Transferred to Deuteragenia ===
- Deuteragenia bifasciata (Geoffroy, 1785)
- Deuteragenia caliptera (Say, 1836)
- Deuteragenia geronimo (Evans, 1964)
- Deuteragenia hurdi (Evans, 1964)
- Deuteragenia iracunda (Townes, 1957)
- Deuteragenia melanocephala (Cameron, 1891)
- Deuteragenia papago Banks, 1943
- Deuteragenia pulchripennis (Cresson, 1867)
- Deuteragenia sayi (Banks, 1941)
- Deuteragenia sericea (Banks, 1944)
- Deuteragenia subintermedia (Magretti, 1886)
- Deuteragenia thoracica (Townes, 1957)
- Deuteragenia variegata (Linnaeus, 1758)

=== Transferred to Winnemanella ===
- Dipogon fulleri (Krombein, 1962)
