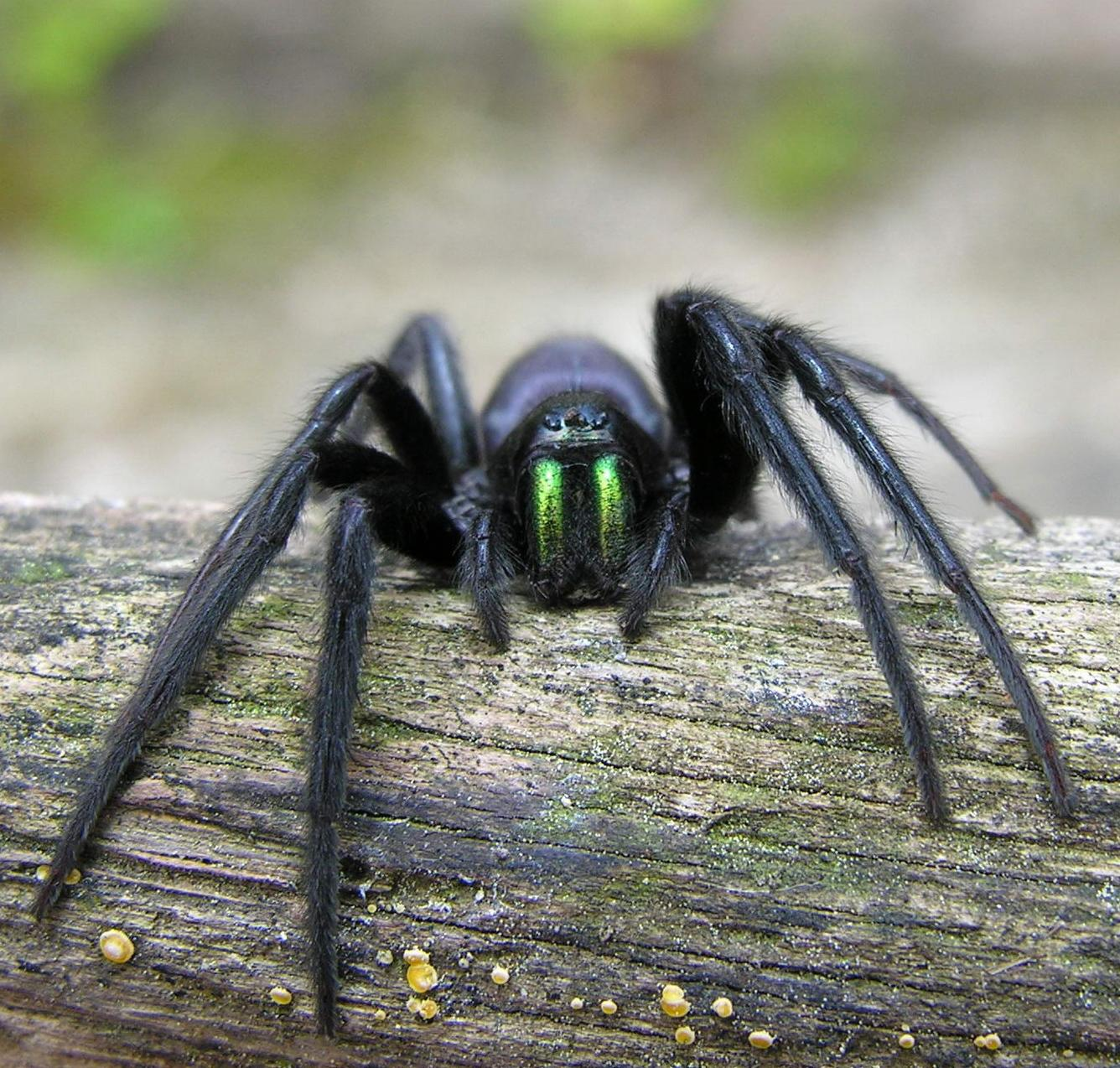

Scientific classification
- Kingdom: Animalia
- Phylum: Arthropoda
- Subphylum: Chelicerata
- Class: Arachnida
- Order: Araneae
- Infraorder: Araneomorphae
- Family: Segestriidae
- Genus: Segestria
- Species: S. florentina

Binomial name
- Segestria florentina (Rossi, 1790)
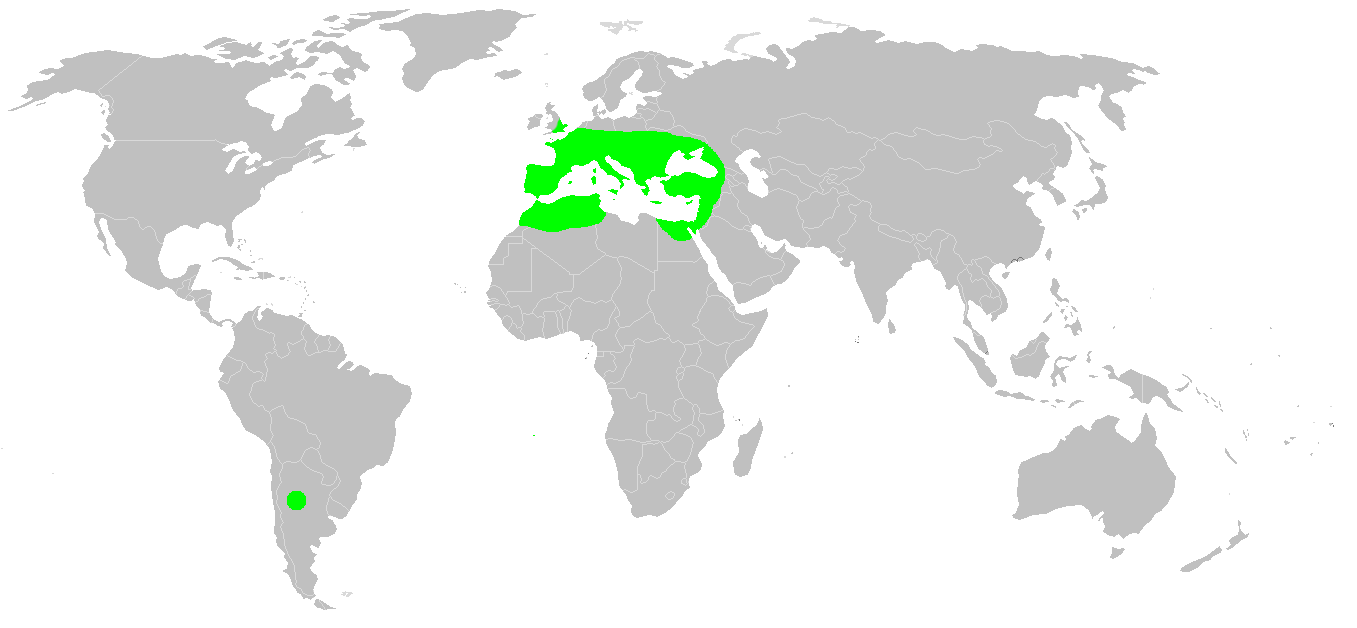

Synonyms
- Aranea subterranea Aranea florentina Aranea perfida Aranea cellaria Segestria perfida Segestria cellaria Segestria gracilis

= Segestria florentina =

Species of spider

Segestria florentina is the largest European segestriid spider. Some vernacular names are green-fanged tube web spider and cellar spider, although the latter is not exclusive to this species.

== Description ==
Females can reach a body length of 22 mm, males up to 15 mm. This species is much darker than others of the same genus. While subadult spiders have a greyish opisthosoma with a marking similar to Segestria senoculata, adults are of a uniform black, sometimes with a green iridescent shine, especially on the chelicerae, which reflect with a striking green. The sexes are similar. Adults occur from June to November.

== Habits ==
They spin a tubular web, often in cracks of buildings. Six or more silken lines radiate from it, and the spider waits in the entrance, touching the lines with the frontal six legs. Prey triggering these lines get caught, and the spider immediately retreats again to eat it. However, in some cases the spider will kill and begin to consume its prey in the opening of the tube, but will retreat further if disturbed. They hunt nocturnal insects such as moths and cockroaches. Bees and wasps are always bitten at the head end, so the sting will face away from the spider.

The female lays her eggs inside the tube web. Sometimes she will die after the spiderlings have hatched, and they will eat their mother. The spider can be lured to the entrance by gently touching the triplines with a stick in the evening or at night.

== Distribution ==
Originally a species of the Mediterranean region as far east as Georgia, it can now be found in many towns in southern Britain, where they were probably introduced via seaports at least since 1845. It has been found in several places in Cornwall, South Molton (North Devon), Shaftesbury, Torbay, Bradninch (Mid Devon), Jersey, Plymouth, Bristol, North Somerset, Swindon, Bovingdon, Gloucester, Ashford, Folkestone, Deal, Dover, Hayes, Southampton, Salisbury, Whitstable, Canterbury, South East London, Vinters Park, Maidstone, Portsmouth, Exeter, Sittingbourne, Isle of Sheppey, Essex, Faversham, Tonbridge, Hitchin, Sheffield, Bridgwater and Newport, where it prefers south-facing walls. Specimens have been found in Exeter Cathedral as far back as 1890. In 2023, it was reported that a population was established in Limerick in western Ireland. It has also been found in Argentina, Australia and several Atlantic islands, where it was probably also introduced. One specimen has also been observed in Leiden, The Netherlands.

Many specimens inhabit Westminster Abbey in an isolated population group that has been proposed as a new subspecies due to their fangs being brighter green and their size being significantly smaller to other European populations.

Egg-laying females are known to prefer the habitation of brick structured buildings. During winter months, females will lay eggs within the bricks of south facing structures. If a female is found between the months of September and October, it is highly likely that she has laid eggs in preparation for the next spring. Infestation of buildings is possible if not found and treated early.

== Bite ==
Its bite is reported to be extremely painful. It has been compared to a "deep injection", and the pain can last for several hours.

Two neurotoxins and one insecticide were found in the venom. The venom reduces the rate and amount of sodium inactivation. Bites are reported to feel like a bee sting, which would make it a 2 on the Schmidt sting pain index, but do not have any lasting effects.
