= Metapolybia cingulata =

Scientific classification
- Kingdom: Animalia
- Phylum: Arthropoda
- Clade: Pancrustacea
- Class: Insecta
- Order: Hymenoptera
- Family: Vespidae
- Genus: Metapolybia
- Species: M. cingulata

Binomial name
- Metapolybia cingulata (Fabricius, 1804)

Species of wasp

Metapolybia cingulata is a species of social paper wasp known for having queens who exhibit usurpation behaviors and also for having flexible behavior groups. It is difficult to tell what a specific wasp's role is just upon observation. Therefore, dissections are usually performed in order to determine the sex, and thus the wasp's role in the colony. The regulating behavior, or nest building, most closely resembles that of primitive Polistes models where a queen solicits liquid from a fellow worker and then takes pulp to initiate building a cell without leaving the nest. In nest building, the amount of water present in the nest as well as the activity of the builders of the nests determines the activity of the colony.

== Taxonomy ==
Metapolybia cingulata is a member of the family Vespidae of eusocial wasps within the order Hymenoptera. Subfamily Polistinae is known commonly as "paper wasps". Genus Metapolybia contains 11 species, of which M. aztecoides is most notable.

== Description and identification ==
Metapolybia cingulata presents a mostly dark or black coloration coupled with translucent wings attached to its back. The abdomen is very well defined and stems off a bit from the main body. Antennae protrude from the head, curving instead of sticking straight out. The only sources of yellow appear to be faint stripes around the abdomen and eyes.

== Distribution and habitat ==
This paper wasp is a tropical polygynous wasp that has been observed in many tropical climates. M. cingulata can be definitively found in South America, and in countries like Venezuela, Trinidad and Tobago, Colombia, Guyana, Suriname, Brazil, Peru, Bolivia, and Ecuador. Their nests are typically found attached to the sides of buildings, firmly attached to one place.

== Nests ==
Nests of Metapolybia cingulata tend to be found on or anchored to strong structures such as buildings. They typically consist of a comb, an envelope, and supporting structures.

=== Construction behaviors ===
Upon close observation of Metapolybia wasps, five different behaviors associated with constructing a nest have been identified: specialized water foragers, specialized pulp foragers, active builders, active generalists, and idle workers. These behaviors differ from the behaviors that are seen in normal, daily life of the colony.

==== Specialized water foragers ====
The role of the specialized water foragers is specifically to get water from outside the nest and transport it back to the nest. They typically share or exchange their water load with flexible pulp foragers so that the cellulose paste can be created to build the nest with. This regurgitation takes place at the nest and usually takes about a minute to finish exchanging with one pulp forager. If the load is even too big for one pulp forager, the water forager will go off and find another pulp forager to drop off the rest of its load with. The maximum rate of water transportation observed in a Metapolybia colony was 101 loads during 210 minutes which means that on average, each trip took 2.08 minutes to complete. Water totally controls the tempo of the entire colony. As more water becomes available, pulp foragers with increase their pace which will force the other groups to do the same.

==== Flexible pulp foragers ====
These flexible pulp foragers bring cellulose back to the colony. They spend roughly a third of their total activity (time moving) actively transporting the cellulose pulp into the nest. Generally, the pulp forager will first meet with a water forager to get a small portion of water to carry with them. They will fly to a fiber source where the water is mixed in with the fiber source at the site of collection, then a small portion is collected with their mandibles and carry the pulp back to the nest. Upon meeting with the builder, portions of the paste are handed off or the entire paste is handed out as a whole. Sometimes the pulp foragers will keep a bit of the plant fiber and assist in the building process themselves. However, most of the time, the pulp forager will drop off its load and then meet with a water forager so that they can replenish their stock of water for the next trip. They are labeled as "flexible" because they have been known to take over other active roles in the nest when there is a deficit of those workers. For this reason, the pulp foragers are the ones who set the tempo of the construction behavior of the colony. However, they are affected by the number of active builders actually working. With a decrease in builders, the pulp foragers have to spend more time finding someone to distribute their load to, which usually just ends with them assisting in the building process instead to speed along the exchange.

==== Active builders ====
The job of active builders is to physically construct the nest, including the envelope, comb, and the external support. The flexible pulp foragers transport their materials to the active builders who then further distribute the load. Pulp foragers can carry a cellulose load that is much larger than a single builder can work with. Thus, the large load of paste that the pulp forager brings in has to be cut down and redistributed to other builders, who are spread out within the colony, so that each wasp ends up with a portion that can actually be handled and used effectively. The builder will then malaxate the pulp with the water further and travel to the active site of the construction. Using its mandibles, the builder works the paste into the nest. This entire process typically takes about seven minutes.

==== Idle ====
These idle workers are not actively participating in behaviors. However, this does not mean that these types of workers do not perform any action. In fact, they perform a variety of actions; just not very frequently so most of their time is spent being idle. Due to their lack of productivity, typical idle workers are the source of problems not only within the colony but for other groups of construction behavior as well. In a normal colony, roughly half of the wasps constructing the nest can be labeled as idle while the other half can be labeled as active.

== Colony cycle ==
This species of wasp has queens that practice usurpation behavior. Therefore, new colonies are formed when a foreign queen invades an established colony. This new invader queen will take over the colony she invades and thus occupy the reproductive role that opened up when the old queen was displaced. Now a new colony has formed because all the offspring produced from that point on will be more closely related to her than any of the workers until they have all been replaced. This conflict-of-interest is decreased when the usurping queen is more closely related to the colony she is invading.

=== Castes ===
Metapolybia cingulata are unique in that they lack distinct morphological castes, which is a common trait of polybiines. Upon looking only at the physical body of a female M. cingulata, it is not possible to determine if it is a queen or a worker. Thus, up until now the females had to be dissected in order to determine their position in their hierarchy. The castes can be distinguished by their behavior, but there is not always time to observe them long enough to notice the differences.

== Usurpation ==
Usurpation is a facultative intraspecific process of social parasitism. It is observed to occur in most Metapolybia cingulata colonies, regardless of their size. Usurpation consists of the female social insect invading another colony of the same species, killing or dominating the resident reproductive female and then taking over that reproductive role. A proposition has been made to say that this behavior is the first step of many taken by species who are becoming a more advanced class of social parasitic wasps. Usurpation normally can occur strictly via dominance of the invading queen. However, when the colony size is too large, other measures have to be employed by the queen in order to take over the colony. The two major gains for the usurping queen is a new work force and a new nest, which both cost her less than if she would've tried to raise her offspring by herself.

=== Worker exchange ===
Typically, if two colonies are related enough, they will freely exchange workers and queens. Therefore, it is common to see colonies being taken over by queens with noticeably decreased aggression towards the invader because the queen is slightly related to them. However, when an unrelated queen tries to take over the colony, she is met by both a hostile work force and hostile queen. The colony being usurped resists this extremely foreign invader because they want to keep their offspring as related to the rest of them as possible.

== Behavior ==
=== Worker behavior ===
Castes can only be identified through direction observation of behaviors or through an autopsy. Worker behavior usually consists of completing the tasks necessary to keep the colony running. For example, any maintenance behaviors are always completed by the workers, not the queen. If they are being idle, they sit quietly on the comb and regurgitate food when solicited by another wasp. The workers also constantly groom the queen but not each other. This could be due to the fact that the workers are all attracted to their queen more than they are attracted to each other.

=== Queen behavior ===
Queens can easily be distinguished because they are the sole recipients of trophallactic donations. Trophallaxis is the exchange of liquid or food or necessary elements within colony members. Workers will always exchange their loads, such as food, with their queen, but never with each other because the workers are not the source of offspring.

=== Aggression ===
Aggressive behavior in Metapolybia cingulata is usually noticed due to a relatively common way of presenting. Typically, whenever an individual is seen spreading its wings out wide, this has been understood to be the aggressive stance. Chewing through another individuals wings is also a signal of aggressive behavior.

In mild fights, M. cingulata typically grasp each other's faces using their hind legs. Then, they push their abdomen as close together as possible and vigorously antennate each other. In more intense interactions, the wasps will be in close proximity and then try to bite the other's abdomen. As part of their defense mechanism, these same stinging motions (without actually stinging) are observed. Of course, either competitor is free to fly off at any time if the fight gets too intense.

=== Inter-queen conflict ===
Since most of the colonies formed by the species Metapolybia cingulata are done so through usurpation, there is a time period when there are two queens present in the same colony. Queen-to-queen interactions do occur in the form of competition usually because one queen is trying to take over the other's colony. This competition is especially evident in smaller colonies because their presence greatly alters the social structure. In fact, monogyny is most likely seen in these species so that no inter-queen competition has to occur. Queen aggressive interaction has also been observed.

=== Deception ===
Sometimes the colony being usurped does not retaliate or resist because they are being tricked into thinking that the invader is not foreign. An observed mechanism has been for the invading queen to get rid of her colonies old scent so that the new colony will not characterize her as much of a threat. By spending a significant amount of time at neither nest, her scent wears down and her transition into the new nest is made smoother.

== Reproduction ==
Just as in many wasp species, Metapolybia cingulata has one sole reproductive female for the entire colony. In most colonies where there is a queen present, the worker is more related to the queen than to the offspring. Instead of being polygynous, the workers enforce monogamy within each other. Thus, worker persecution keeps the job of reproduction only for the queen. This limitation of reproduction to one individual per colony has also shown to increase the overall productivity and efficiency of the colony. This suppression of reproduction is also enforced by the queen. She gives birth to very few queens in her lifetime because these reproductively active females have the possibility of overtaking her. Thus, it is very unlikely to observe a colony with many reproductively active females within it. When too many reproductively active females (queens) are present in a colony, it is usually an indication that there is a lack of dominance within the colony. This is especially common in large colonies because there are too many individuals present to truly establish castes and a hierarchy.
