= Orujo (olive waste) =

Wet solid waste of olive oil extraction

Alpeorujo is the solid waste generated by the new two-phase method of olive oil extraction.

Orujo is called the wet solid waste, which is generated by the traditional methods of extraction, based on presses, and the continuous three-phase decanting processes. The process generates additionally one stream of olive oil and two streams of wastes, the Orujo and an aqueous waste called alpechín.
