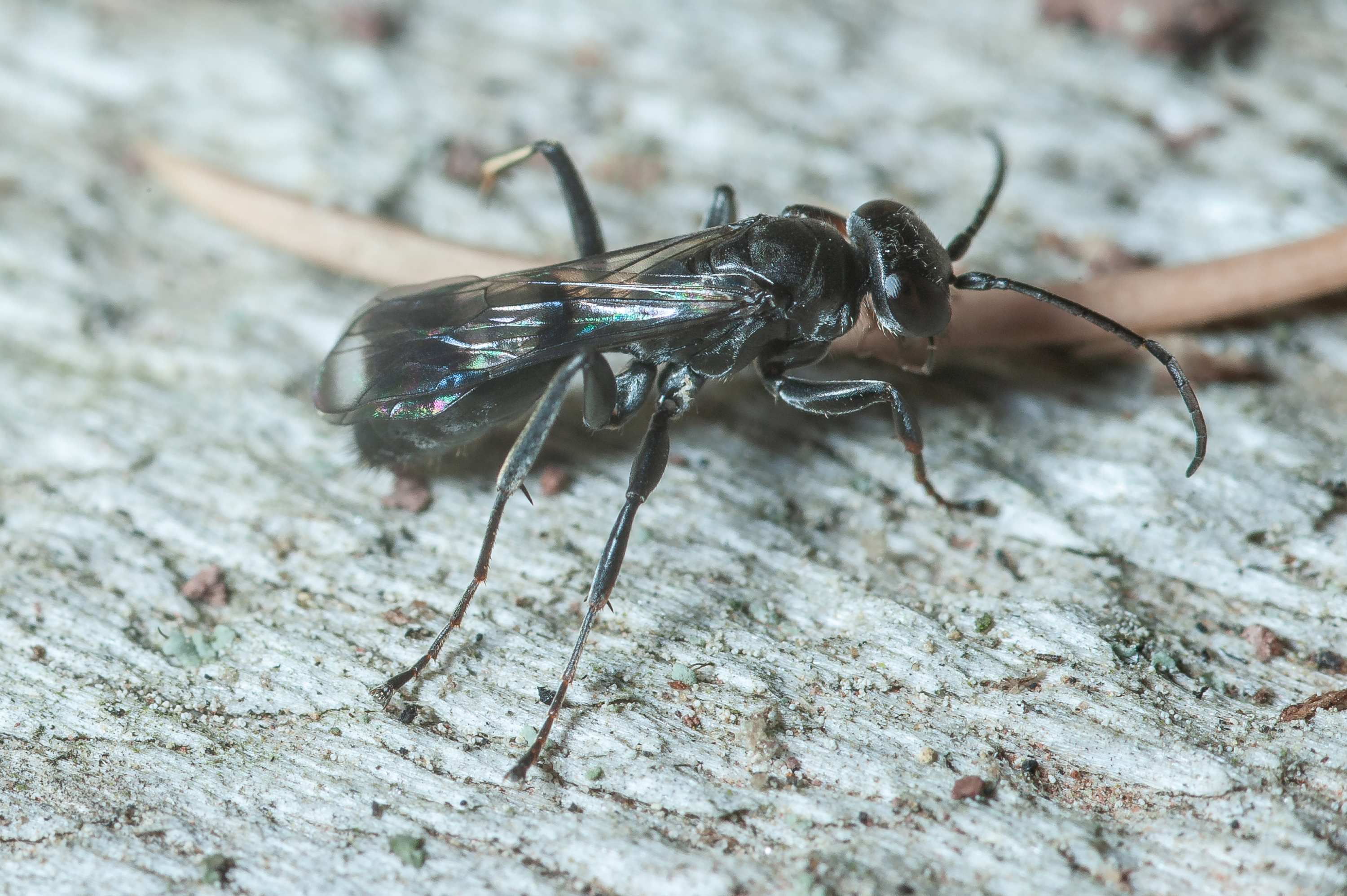
- female

Scientific classification
- Kingdom: Animalia
- Phylum: Arthropoda
- Class: Insecta
- Order: Hymenoptera
- Family: Pompilidae
- Genus: Deuteragenia
- Species: D. subintermedia

Binomial name
- Deuteragenia subintermedia (Magretti, 1886)

Synonyms
- Dipogon subintermedius (Magretti, 1886); Deuteragenia nitida Haupt, 1926

= Deuteragenia subintermedia =

Species of wasp

Deuteragenia subintermedia is a spider wasp from the family Pompilidae.

== Identification ==
Like D. bifasciata, this is an all-black species with bifasciated wings, but the female has shorter antennae than D. bifasciata.

== Distribution and habitat ==
Found from southern Great Britain north, it has an isolated population in the central Scottish Highlands, although the species has not been recorded in Ireland, through central and eastern Europe east to Mongolia. It is the most common of the three species of Deuterageniini found in Britain.

It prefers woodland and hedgerows where dead wood is present to provide breeding sites.

== Biology ==
In Britain, this wasp flies from June to September. The only recorded prey in Britain is a species of spider Segestria senoculata from the family Segestriidae, but elsewhere, spiders of the genus Clubiona (Clubionidae) have been recorded as prey. The spider is carried to the wasp's nest by its spinnerets, and prey is then malaxated, which may be a process by which the wasp obtains proteins necessary to produce eggs; certainly, wasps of the genus Deuteragenia do not appear to visit flowers to obtain nectar.

The nest is usually constructed in an existing cavity, normally in wood, and old beetle excavations are often used, although cavities in masonry will also be used. The cavity is normally sealed with spider silk, applied using the maxillary bristles which give the generic name to these wasps. Records exist of two larvae of D. subintermedia on a single specimen of S. senoculata.
