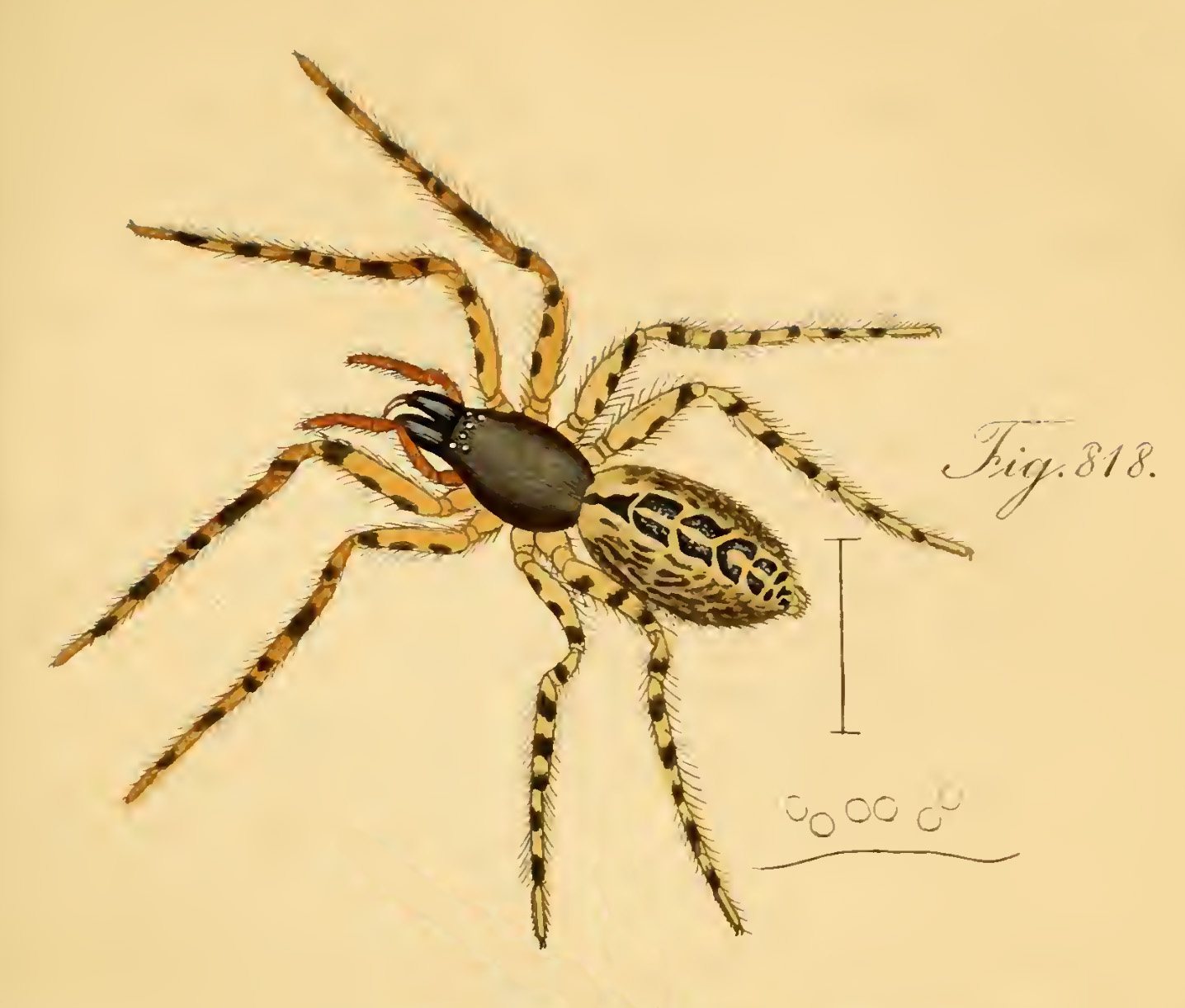
- female from original description
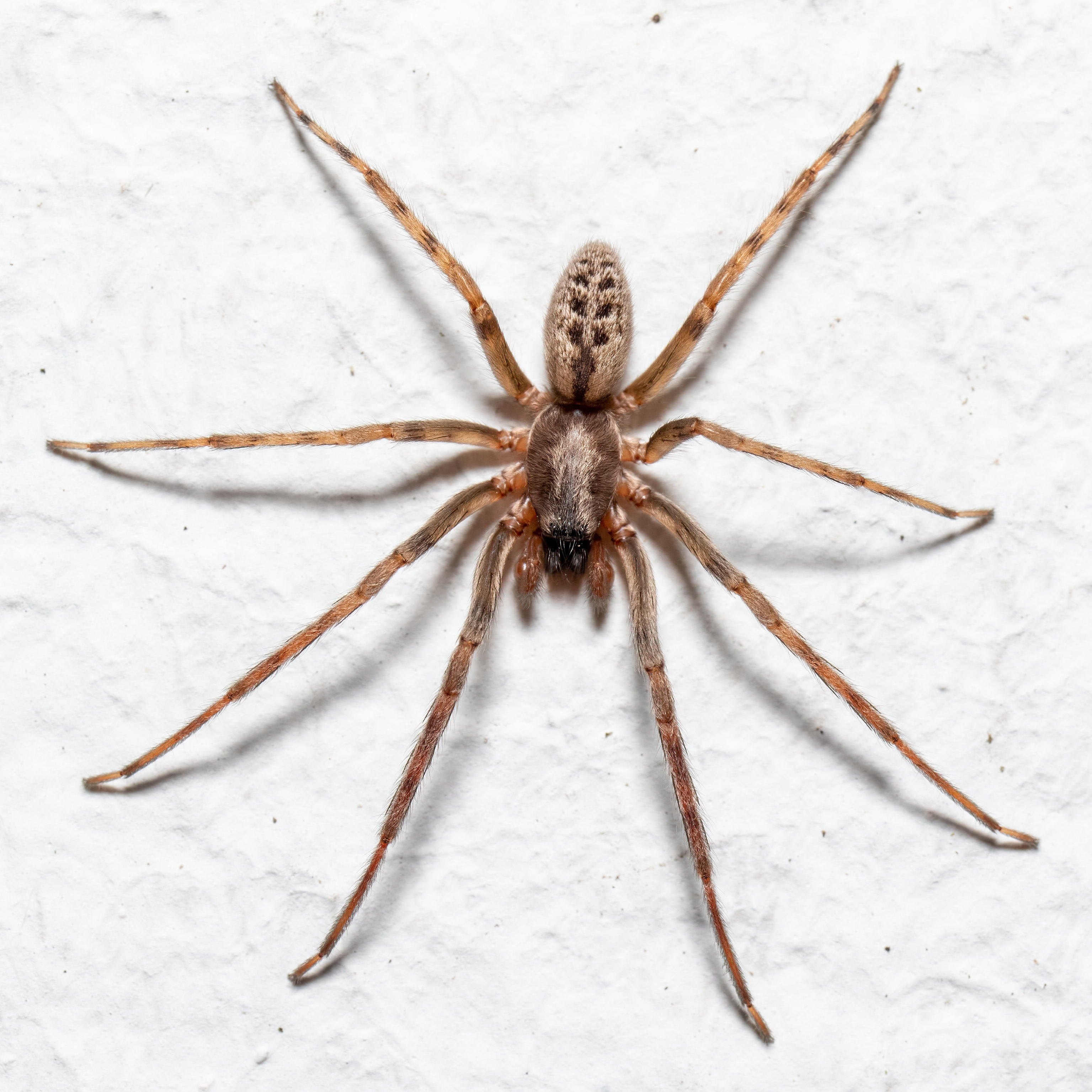
- male from France

Scientific classification
- Kingdom: Animalia
- Phylum: Arthropoda
- Subphylum: Chelicerata
- Class: Arachnida
- Order: Araneae
- Infraorder: Araneomorphae
- Family: Segestriidae
- Genus: Segestria
- Species: S. bavarica

Binomial name
- Segestria bavarica C. L. Koch, 1843

= Segestria bavarica =

Species of spider

Segestria bavarica is a species of spider in the family Segestriidae. It is found across Europe, Turkey, and the Caucasus region.

== Etymology ==
The species name bavarica refers to Bavaria, the German region where the species was first described by C. L. Koch in 1843.

== Distribution ==
S. bavarica has been recorded from throughout Europe, extending into Turkey and the Caucasus region. The species appears to be relatively uncommon in some areas, with Koch noting it was quite rare in Bavaria in his original description.

== Description ==
=== Female ===
The female of S. bavarica has a body length of 6 mm. The cephalothorax is dark brown with black chelicerae. The abdomen is yellowish-grey with black spotting, featuring a relatively broad band of spots along the back that are crossed by yellowish stripes lengthwise. The legs are yellowish with black spots and rings.

The abdomen shows a distinctive pattern with a broad, dark brown longitudinal band running across the back, bordered by fine longitudinal lines. This band contains wave-like black spots, some of which may merge. The sides of the abdomen have a wine-red tinge, and the spinnerets are light ochre-yellow.

=== Male ===
The male was described by Westring in 1861. The male has a thorax length of 4.5 mm and dark brown to blackish mandibles. The pubescence is greyish-white and dense. The abdomen is dark brown with dorsal spots, and features 4-5 oval or round, blackish spots on each side that are bordered by greyish-white and crossed by longitudinal lines. The legs are reddish-brown with evident dark brown spotting. The front legs have darkly saturated brown patellae and tibiae, while the metatarsi are less dense in males compared to females.

== Habitat ==
Koch reported finding both adults and juveniles under loose stones in rock crevices near limestone formations, though he was unable to locate the male's web structure in his original observations.

== Taxonomy ==
The species was first described by C. L. Koch in 1843, with the male subsequently described by Niklas Westring in 1861.
