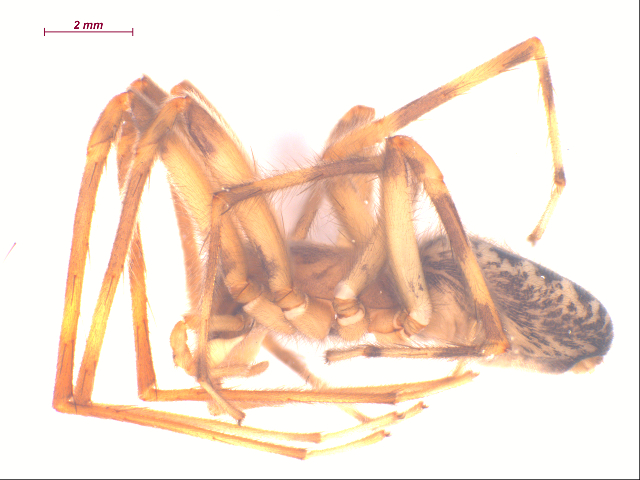
- S. pacifica, male
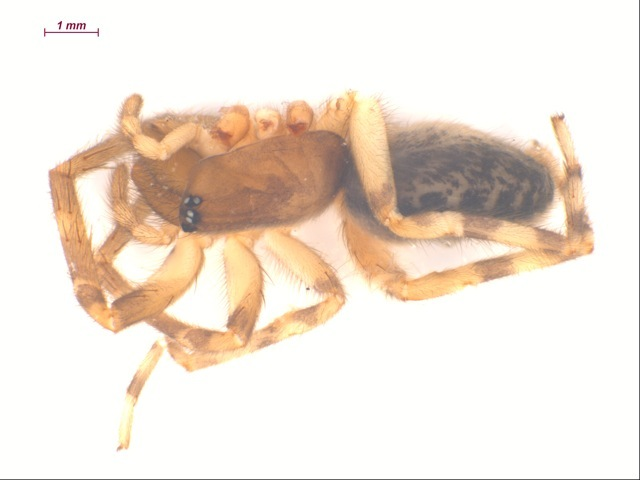
- S. pacifica, female

Scientific classification
- Domain: Eukaryota
- Kingdom: Animalia
- Phylum: Arthropoda
- Subphylum: Chelicerata
- Class: Arachnida
- Order: Araneae
- Infraorder: Araneomorphae
- Family: Segestriidae
- Genus: Segestria
- Species: S. pacifica

Binomial name
- Segestria pacifica Banks, 1891

= Segestria pacifica =

Species of spider

Segestria pacifica is a species of tube web spiders in the family Segestriidae. It is found in the western United States and in British Columbia. It is brown and medium-large with "large, black, and shiny chelicerae" (mouthparts).
