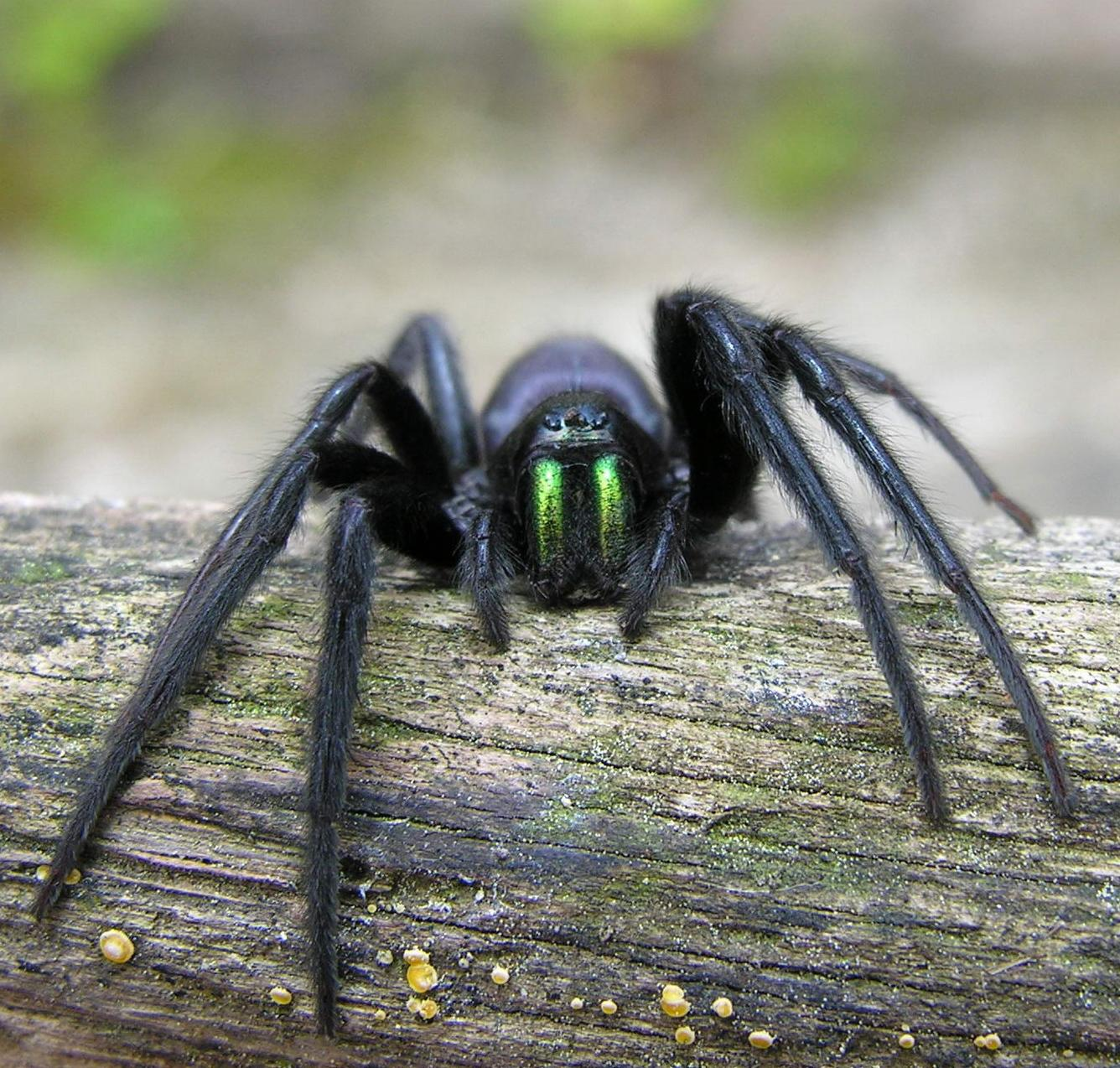
- S. florentina

Scientific classification
- Kingdom: Animalia
- Phylum: Arthropoda
- Subphylum: Chelicerata
- Class: Arachnida
- Order: Araneae
- Infraorder: Araneomorphae
- Family: Segestriidae
- Genus: Segestria; Latreille, 1804

Type species
- Aranea florentina (Rossi, 1790)

Species
- 22, see text

= Segestria (spider) =

Segestria Temporal range: Cretaceous– Present

Genus of spiders

Segestria is a genus of tube dwelling spiders that was first described by Pierre André Latreille in 1804.

== Species ==
As of September 2021 it contains 21 species and one subspecies, found mainly in Eurasia, though some species are found in the Americas, two in North Africa, and one in New Zealand and one in Madagascar:

- Segestria bavarica C. L. Koch, 1843 — Europe to Azerbaijan
- Segestria bella Chamberlin & Ivie, 1935 — USA
- Segestria cavernicola Kulczyński, 1915 — Italy
- Segestria croatica Doleschall, 1852 — Croatia
- Segestria danzantica Chamberlin, 1924 — Mexico
- Segestria davidi Simon, 1884 — Syria
- Segestria fengi (Fomichev & Marusik, 2020) — China
- Segestria florentina (Rossi, 1790) (type) — Europe to Georgia. Introduced to Brazil, Uruguay, Argentina
- Segestria fusca Simon, 1882 — Portugal, Spain, France, Italy
- Segestria inda Simon, 1906 — India
- Segestria madagascarensis Keyserling, 1877 — Madagascar
- Segestria mirshamsii Marusik & Omelko, 2014 — Iran
- Segestria nekhaevae Fomichev & Marusik, 2020 — Tajikistan
- Segestria nipponica Kishida, 1913 — Japan
- Segestria pacifica Banks, 1891 — USA
- Segestria pusiola Simon, 1882 — Spain, France (Corsica), Algeria
- Segestria saeva Walckenaer, 1837 — New Zealand
- Segestria sbordonii Brignoli, 1984 — Greece (Crete)
- Segestria senoculata (Linnaeus, 1758) — Europe, Turkey, Caucasus, Iran, Japan
  - Segestria senoculata castrodunensis Gétaz, 1889 — Switzerland
- Segestria shtoppelae Fomichev & Marusik, 2020 — Kazakhstan
- Segestria turkestanica Dunin, 1986 — Central Asia
