= Segestria saeva =

Conservation status
- Data Deficit (NZ TCS)

Scientific classification
- Kingdom: Animalia
- Phylum: Arthropoda
- Subphylum: Chelicerata
- Class: Arachnida
- Order: Araneae
- Infraorder: Araneomorphae
- Family: Segestriidae
- Genus: Segestria
- Species: S. saeva

Binomial name
- Segestria saeva Walckenaer, 1837

Species of spider

Segestria saeva is a species of tube-dwelling spider endemic to New Zealand.

== Taxonomy ==
This species was first described in 1837 by Charles Walckenaer.

== Distribution ==
This species is endemic to New Zealand.

== Conservation status ==
Under the New Zealand Threat Classification System, this species is listed as "Data Deficient" with the qualifiers of "Data Poor: Size" and "Data Poor: Trend".
