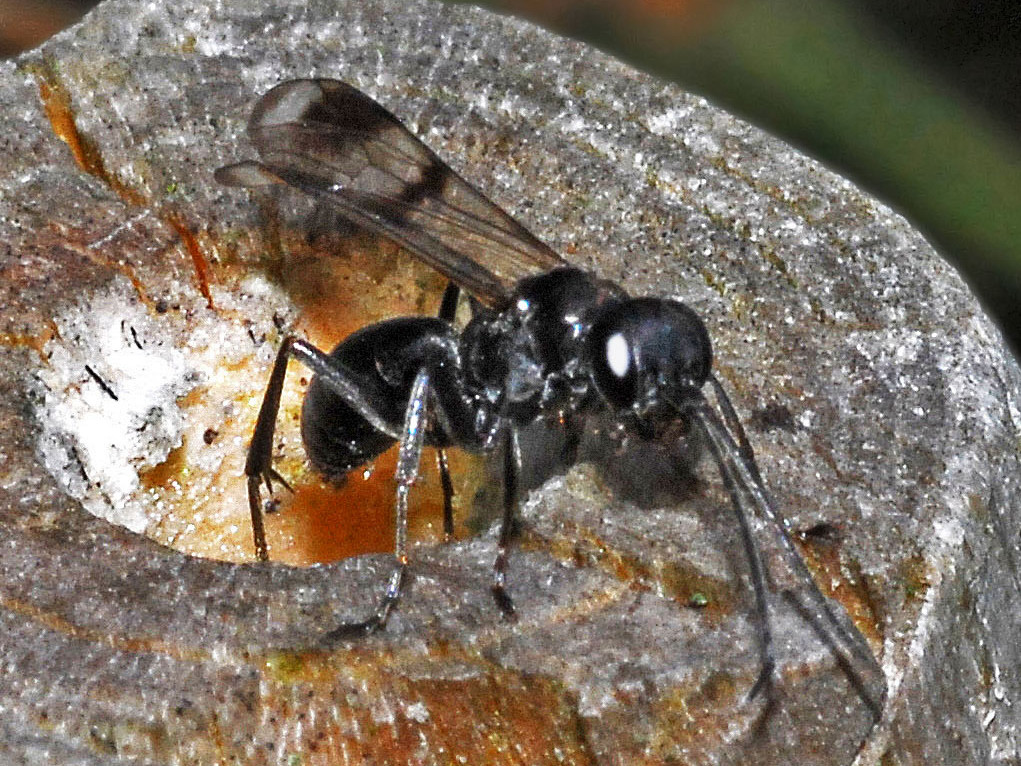

Scientific classification
- Kingdom: Animalia
- Phylum: Arthropoda
- Class: Insecta
- Order: Hymenoptera
- Family: Pompilidae
- Genus: Deuteragenia
- Species: D. variegata

Binomial name
- Deuteragenia variegata (Linnaeus, 1758)

Synonyms
- Deuteragenia faggiolii Haupt, 1935; Agenia erythropus Ferton, 1897; Agenia structor Kohl, 1888; Dipogon variegatus (Linnaeus, 1758)

= Deuteragenia variegata =

Species of wasp

Deuteragenia variegata is a species of pompilid spider wasp in the subfamily Pepsinae. It is found in the Palearctic.

== Description ==
Deuteragenia variegata can reach a body length of about 5–10 mm (0.20–0.39 in). Like the other two British Deuterageniini, this is an all black wasp with bifasciate forewings (two dark brown bands) with a white spot at the top. The females can be recognised by transverse wrinkles on the first abdominal segment, in males these are less prominent and the subgenital plate at the tip of the abdomen has long ventral hairs.

== Distribution and habitat ==
This species can be found in most of Europe, in the eastern Palearctic realm, and in North Africa. In Britain it is mainly found in England and Wales with scattered records in the south of Scotland and the central Highlands but has not been recorded recently in Ireland.

These wasps inhabit a wide variety of open habitats including gardens, parks, fields, meadows and coastal heaths.

== Biology ==
Adults have a flight period from May to October. D. variegata will utilise almost any kind of pre-existing cavity including dead plant stems, dead wood, masonry cavities and even old snail shells. The nest cavity is plugged with sand grains, soil or plant debris which is bound together by spider silk collected by the female using the maxillar bristles. In small cavities single cells may be constructed but if space permits multiple cells will be built. Each cell is provided with one spider, mainly belonging to the genera Clubiona, Thomisus and Xysticus. In Britain it seems to exclusively prey on the crab spider Xysticus cristatus.
