= Deuteragenia bifasciata =

Scientific classification
- Kingdom: Animalia
- Phylum: Arthropoda
- Clade: Pancrustacea
- Class: Insecta
- Order: Hymenoptera
- Family: Pompilidae
- Genus: Deuteragenia
- Species: D. bifasciata

Binomial name
- Deuteragenia bifasciata (Geoffroy, 1785)

Synonyms
- Ichneumon bifasciatus Geoffroy, 1785; Pompilus hircanus Fabricius, 1798>; Deuteragenia intermedia Dahlbom, in Kloet & Hincks, 1945; Dipogon bifasciatus (Geoffroy, 1785)

Species of wasp

Deuteragenia bifasciata is a species of spider wasp from the family Pompilidae. This species is found in the Palearctic.

== Taxonomy ==
Deuteragenia bifasciata was first formally described as Ichneumon bifasciatus in 1785 by the French naturalist Étienne Louis Geoffroy with its type locality given as France. This species was classified in the Palearctic subgenus, Deuteragenia, of the genus Dipogon within the tribe Pepsini of the subfamily Pepsinae in the spider wasp family Pompilidae. Following revision of the family, Deuteragenia was elevated to a separate genus.

== Description ==
Deuteragenia bifasciata is an all-black species with bifasciate wings with the tufts of forward-pointing bristles on the maxilla of the female, the purpose of which is to pack the nest entrance with old spider silk. Females grow to 5–9 mm in length, and males 4–7 mm.

== Distribution ==
These spider wasps are found in southern Britain through Europe to Russia and on to Japan. In Europe, the southern limits are in Italy and Bulgaria.

== Habitat ==
Deuteragenia bifasciata is typically found where there is rotting wood, in dead or dying trees or on old fence posts and other wooden artifacts. It has a variable habitat selection which includes woodland as well as more open habitats such as parkland and heath.

== Biology ==
Deuteragenia bifasciata hunts crab spiders, of the family Thomisidae, in Britain Xysticus cristatus has been observed as a prey item. The prey is stored in cells created in old insect burrows dug into rotting wood, hollow stems and cracks in walls, and, unlike many other Pompilid spider wasps, these may be clustered with six cells in each burrow. A single egg is laid on each paralysed crab spider, smaller spiders host males and larger females. The nest is made up of sawdust, plant fibres and dismembered insect parts bound together with spider silk and sealed with chewed wood.
