= Metapolybia aztecoides =

Scientific classification
- Kingdom: Animalia
- Phylum: Arthropoda
- Class: Insecta
- Order: Hymenoptera
- Family: Vespidae
- Subfamily: Polistinae
- Genus: Metapolybia
- Species: M. aztecoides

Binomial name
- Metapolybia aztecoides (Richards, 1978)

Species of wasp

Metapolybia aztecoides is a species of vespid wasp.

== Taxonomy and phylogeny ==
Metapolybia is a small genus of neotropical paper wasps that are found within the tribe Epiponini and the subfamily Polistinae. The most recent revision of the genus recognizes 11 different species within Metapolybia. Metapolybia aztecoides is most often studied with other species of the Metapolybia genus, like Metapolybia suffusa and Metapolybia docilis.
