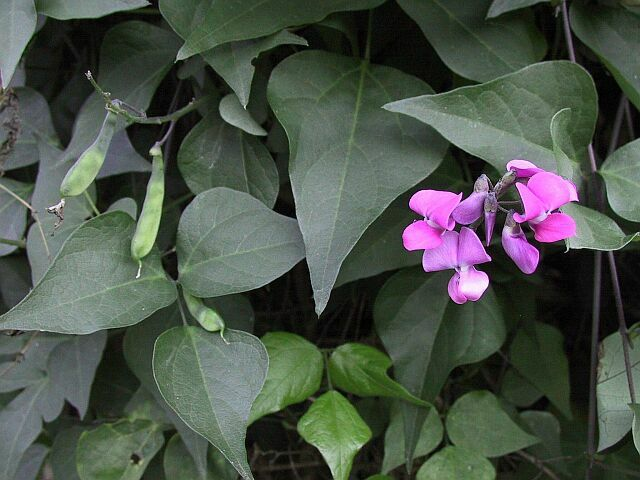

Scientific classification
- Kingdom: Plantae
- Clade: Tracheophytes
- Clade: Angiosperms
- Clade: Eudicots
- Clade: Rosids
- Order: Fabales
- Family: Fabaceae
- Subfamily: Faboideae
- Genus: Dipogon; Liebm. 1854, conserved name not Willd. ex Steud. 1840 (Poaceae)
- Species: D. lignosus

Binomial name
- Dipogon lignosus (L.) Verdc.

Synonyms
- Dolichos gibbosus Thunb.; Dolichos lignosus L.; Verdcourtia R. Wilczek; Verdcourtia lignosa (L.) R. Wilczek

= Dipogon lignosus =

Species of legume

Dipogon lignosus, the okie bean, Cape sweet-pea, dolichos pea or mile-a-minute vine, is a species of flowering plant in the legume family, Fabaceae. It is the only species classified in the monotypic genus Dipogon which belongs to the subfamily Faboideae.

== Description ==
Dipogon lignosus is climbing woody, herbaceous perennial which becomes woody towards the base. The soft green stems climb over nearby structures, shrubs or trees, and can grow up to 2 m tall, extending a long way horizontally if possible. Its leaves are dark to medium green above, paler below and are composed of three diamond shaped leaflets which have a wide set base before tapering to a fine point. Each leaflet has its own stalk. The flowers are typical for the pea family and are pink, mauve, magenta and purple in colour, growing on the tips of new growth stems in short, dense racemes with long peduncles. Flowering occurs throughout spring and summer, i.e. August to January in its native South Africa. The pods are flat and sickle-shaped, each containing four to six seeds, and are formed soon after flowering. In warmer climates this is an evergreen, but it may develop a deciduous habit in areas where are subject to frosts.

== Distribution ==
Dipogon lignosus has a native range that covers the Western Cape and Eastern Cape in South Africa where it prefers milder areas where it is not subjected to frost. It is an invasive weed in Australia and New Zealand and in some areas control of D. lignosus can be mandated.

== Habitat and biology ==
In South Africa Dipogon lignosus has a natural habitat of forest margins and stream banks, where it climbs over other shrubs and trees. This habitat preference is replicated in Australia but it is usually found close to human habitation. It prefers to grow in moderately shady sites where there is dense vegetation to provide support for its twining stems.

The seeds are explosively thrown out of the ripe pods landing some distance from the parent plant and they are able to remain dormant in the soil for some years when conditions are unfavourable for germination. Germination is stimulated by disturbance such as fire, rain or seasonal changes. As a legume D. lignosus has symbiotic nitrogen fixing bacteria which live on nodules on the roots and these enhance soil fertility The bacteria are afforded nutrients and shelter by the planta and the bacteria provide their host with usable nitrogen collected from minerals in the soil. It is tolerant of salt laden winds.

== Horticulture ==
Dipogon lignosus has been widely cultivated outside of South Africa from as far back as the early nineteenth century. Areas where it has been used in horticulture include Europe, Madeira, Azores, Sri Lanka, Australia, California and temperate regions of South America.

== Invasion ==
Dipogon lignosus is regarded as highly invasive in Australia especially in riverside and coastal vegetation, heathland, dry sclerophyll forest, warm temperate rainforest and grassland. It is an effective invader as the seed is explosively ejected from pods over distances of several metres or the seeds may be spread further in dumped garden refuse or contaminated soil and it is also dispersed by birds or water for distances that may exceed 1 km. Rhizomes can also be transported to spread the plant.

Control of D. lignosus in native Australian vegetation can be very labour-intensive and the best control strategy is to minimise disturbance by removing the smaller, scattered plants initially and then targeting the larger infestations starting at their outer margins. The small seedlings may be sprayed with a suitable herbicide where appropriate. For larger plants, the climbing stems should be cut down to the roots with the remnant stumps then being excavated or immediately treated with herbicide.

== Taxonomy and nomenclature ==
The specific name lignosus means woody in Latin, referring to the woody stems base at the base of the plant. Dipogon is derived from the Greek di, meaning two, and pogon meaning beard, referring to the style which has a thick beard on its upper side near its tip.

Originally it was placed in the genus Dolichos, hence the Australian vernacular name of dolichos pea, and Carl Linnaeus named the spcesies as Dolichos lignosus. Bernard Verdcourt moved it into the monotypic genus Dipogon in 1968 when he was revising the genus Dolichos, using the name Dipogon which had been used by Liebmann in 1854 and as it was an already established synonym for Dolichos lignosus.

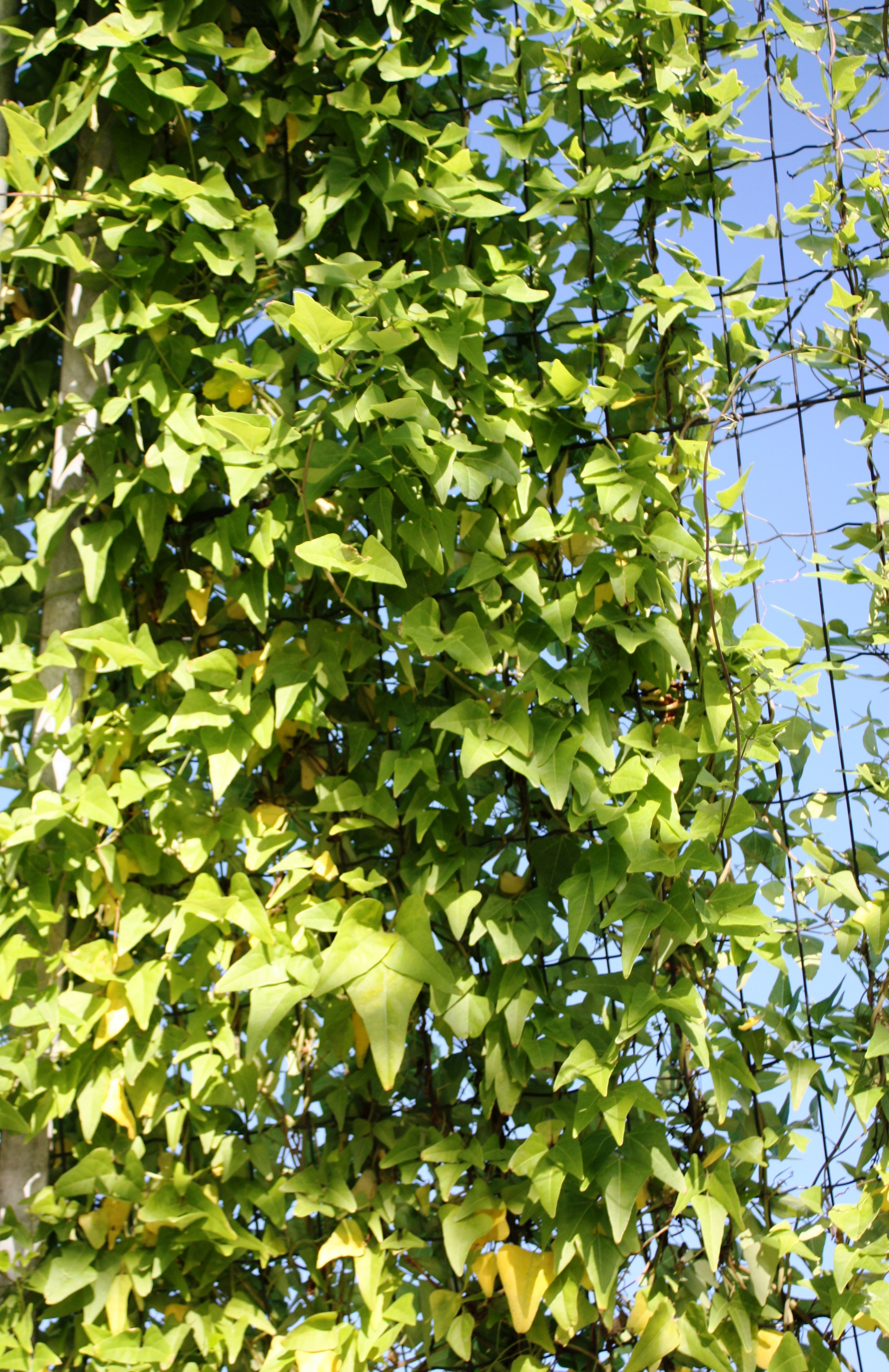
Dipogon lignosus - bosklimop creeper - Cape Town coast 5
