= Deuteragenia sayi =

Scientific classification
- Kingdom: Animalia
- Phylum: Arthropoda
- Class: Insecta
- Order: Hymenoptera
- Family: Pompilidae
- Genus: Deuteragenia
- Species: D. sayi

Binomial name
- Deuteragenia sayi Banks, 1941

Synonyms
- Dipogon sayi Banks, 1941

Species of insect

Deuteragenia sayi is a species of spider wasp of the family Pompilidae.

== Description ==
This species is among the smaller spider wasps. The body is black, slender, and long-legged. The clear wings are banded, with the band closest to the thorax thinner than the one near the wingtip.

== Habitat ==
This species is found in woods, where it searches stems, twigs, logs, trunks, and branches for nest sites.

== Behavior ==
This species nests in preexisting cavities, namely those in trees. Prey includes most of the common species of spiders. D. sayi rarely visits flowers, though it is recorded on Queen Anne's Lace (Daucus carota).
