= Olive oil extraction =

Process of extracting oil from olives

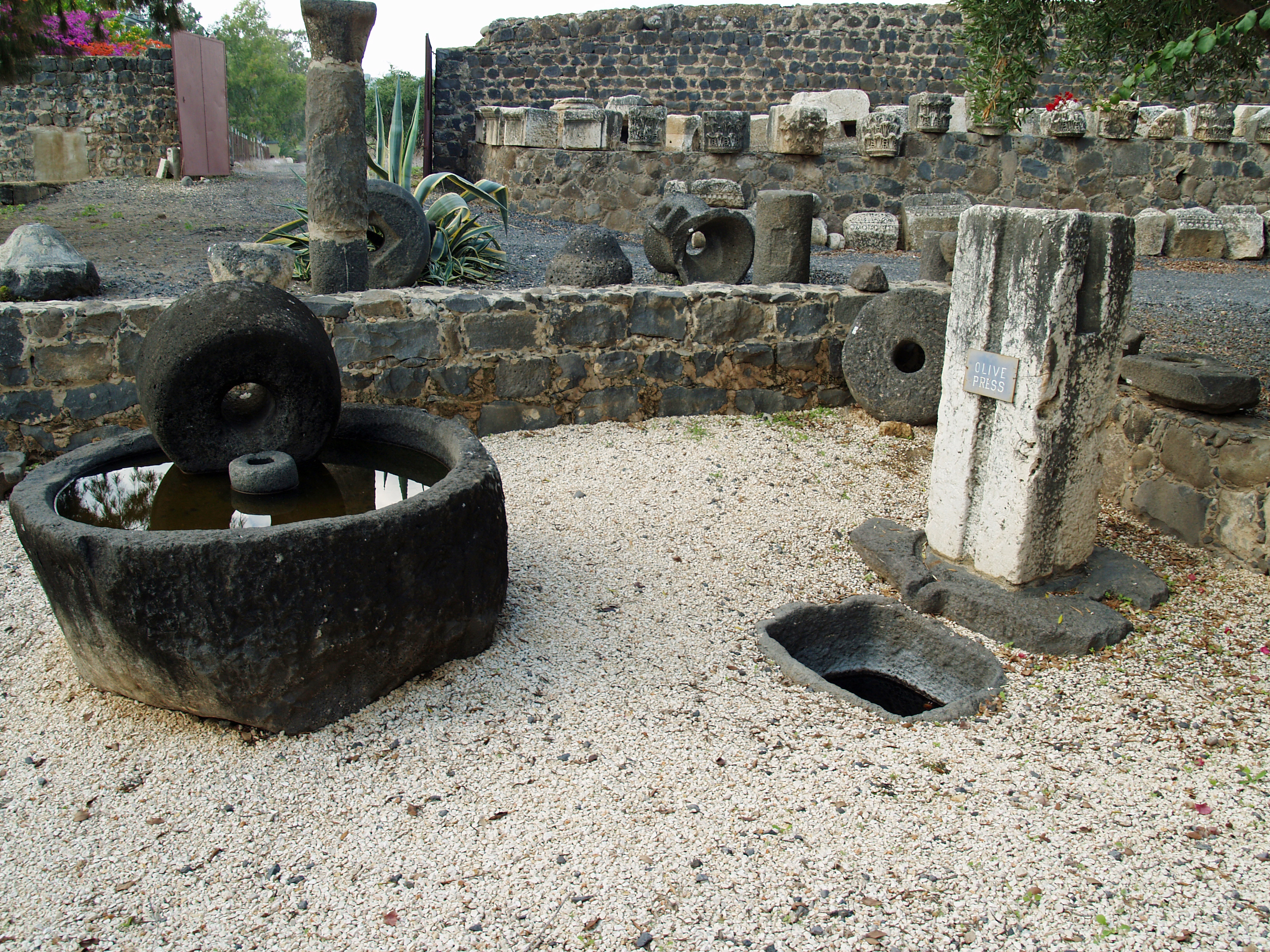
An olive mill and an olive press from the Byzantine period in Capernaum

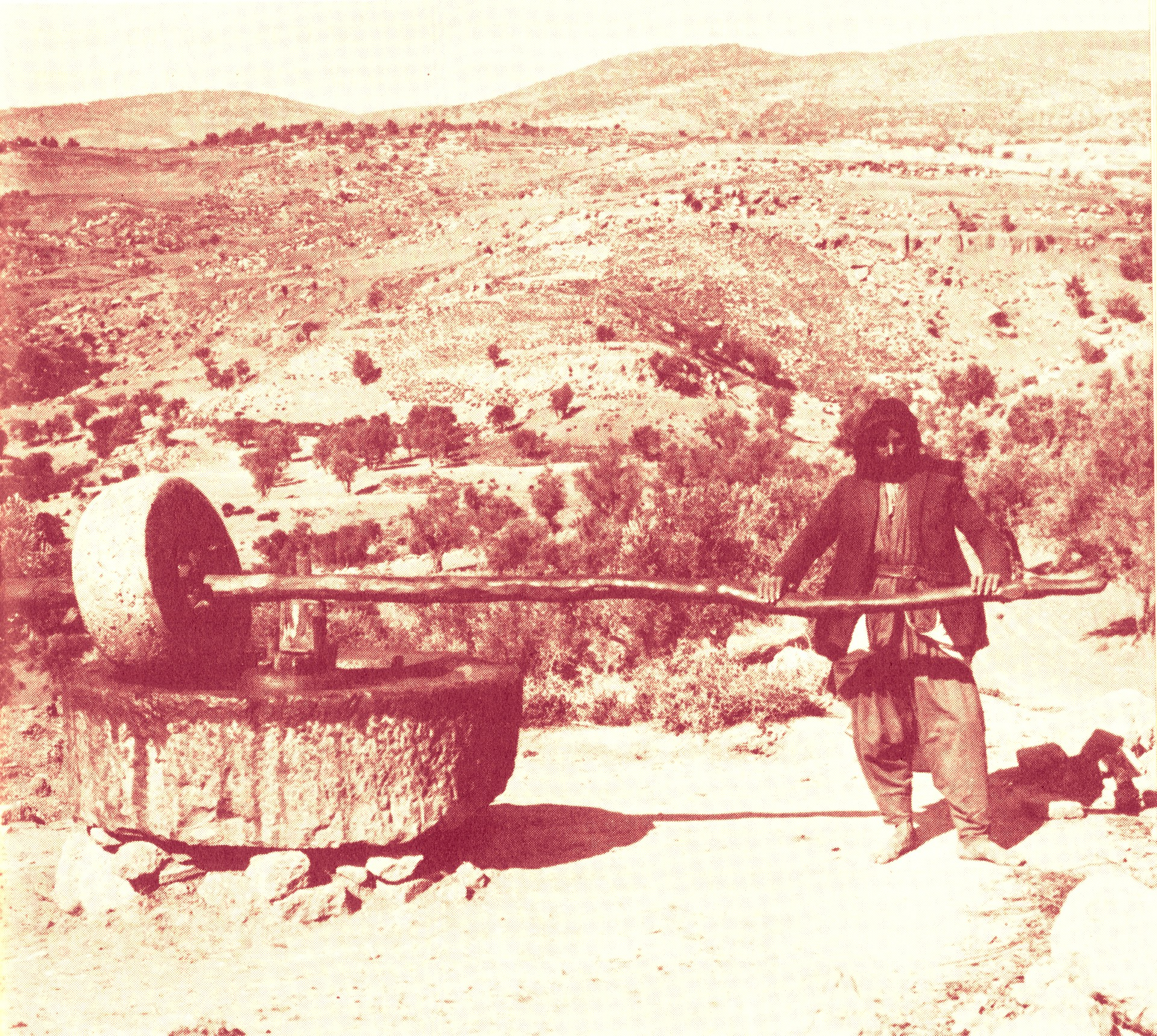
Olive press in Beit Jibrin, Mandatory Palestine (20th century)

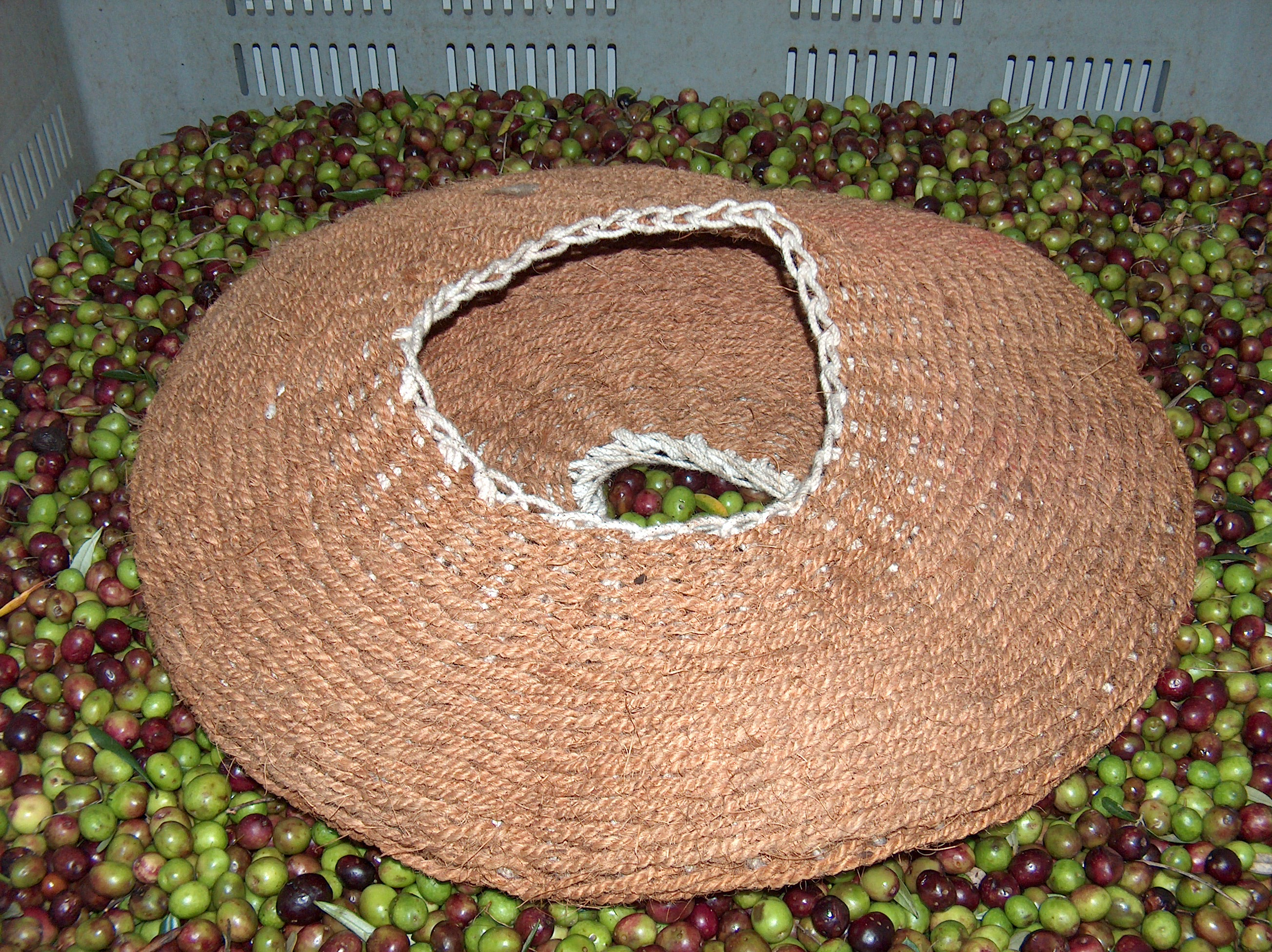
Frail (pressing basket), used in pressing the olive pulp

Olive oil extraction is the process of extracting the olive oil present in olive drupes. Olive oil is produced in the mesocarp cells, and stored in a particular type of vacuole called a lipo vacuole, i.e., every cell contains a tiny olive oil droplet. Olive oil extraction is the process of separating the oil from the other fruit contents (vegetative extract liquid and solid material). It is possible to attain this separation by physical means alone, i.e., oil and water do not mix, so they are relatively easy to separate. This contrasts with other oils that are extracted with chemical solvents, generally hexane. The first operation when extracting olive oil is washing the olives, to reduce the presence of contaminants, especially soil which can create a particular flavor effect called "soil taste".

== Olive presses ==
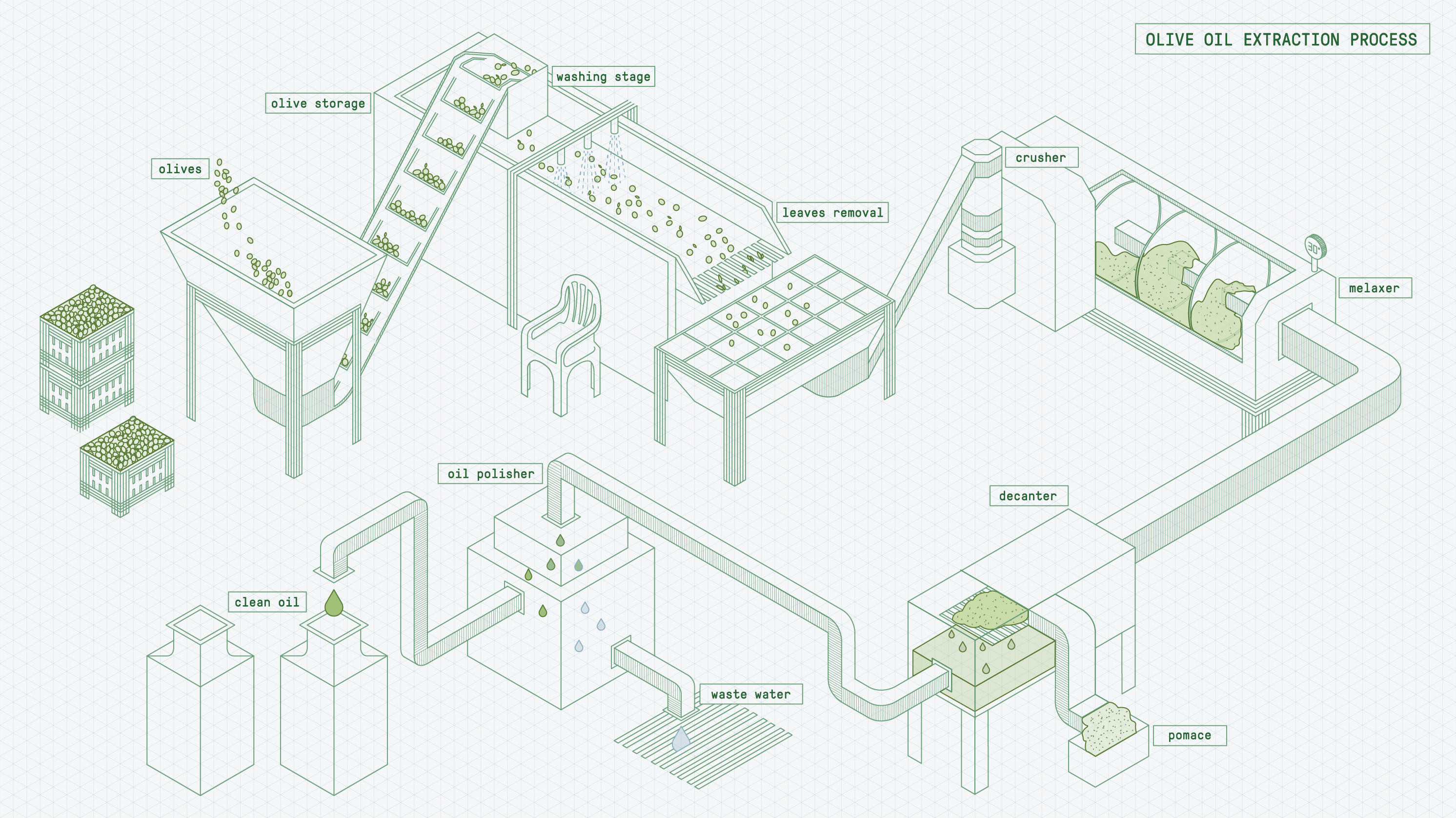
Modern method of olive oil extraction

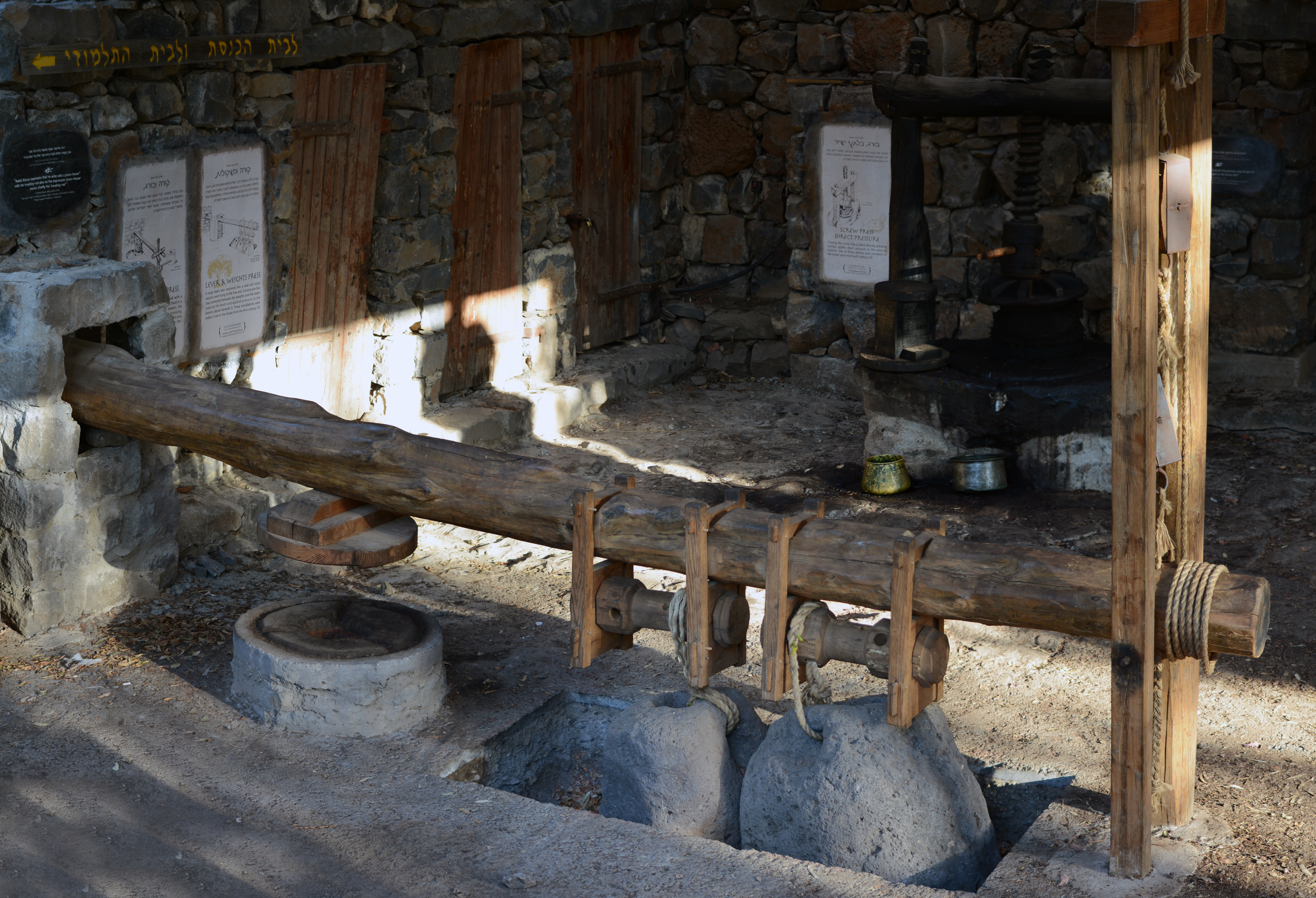
Reconstructed lever-and-weights press from a 4th-to-8th-century village in the Golan Heights

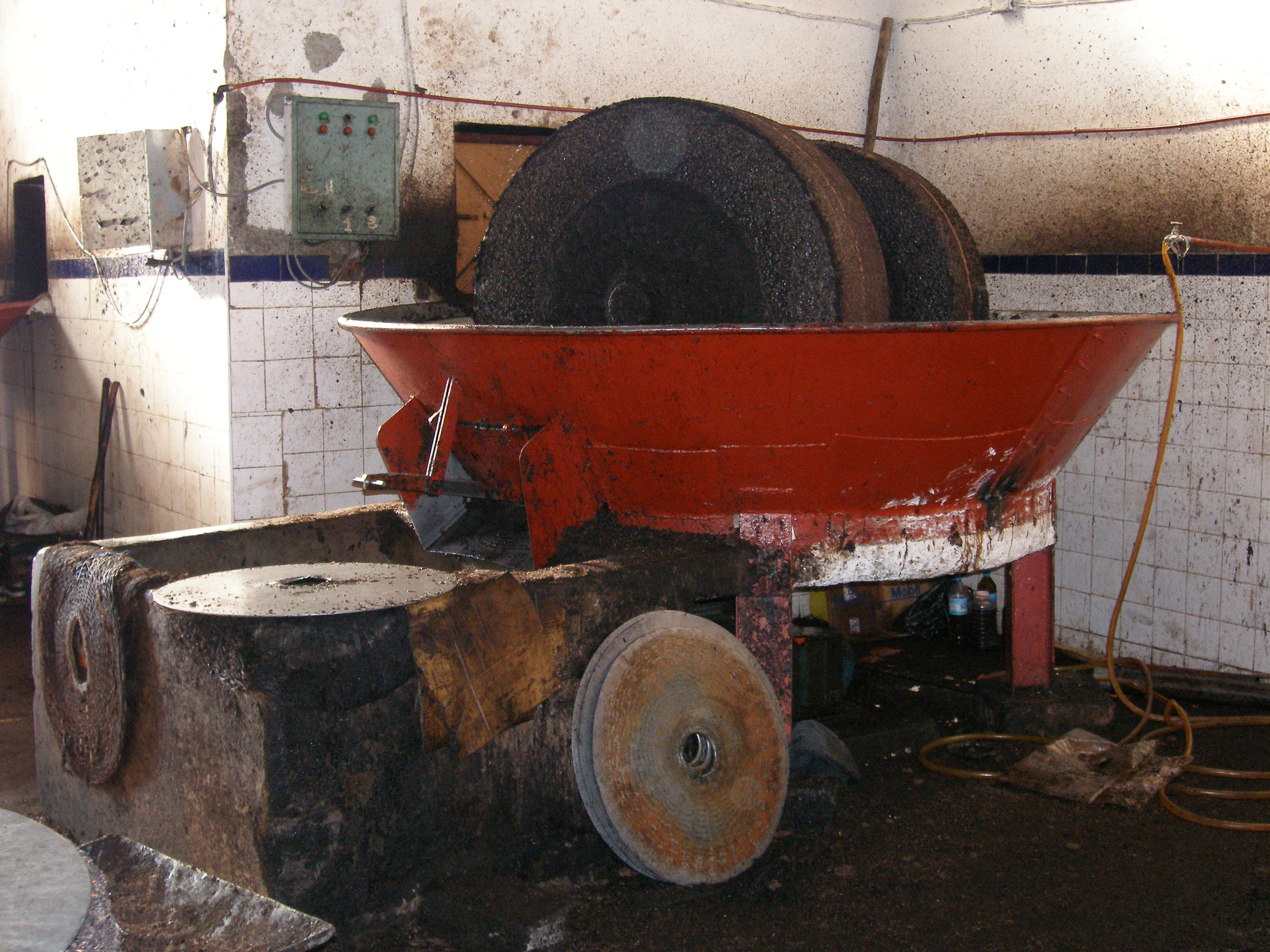
Grinder with two millstones and in the foreground several fiber disks

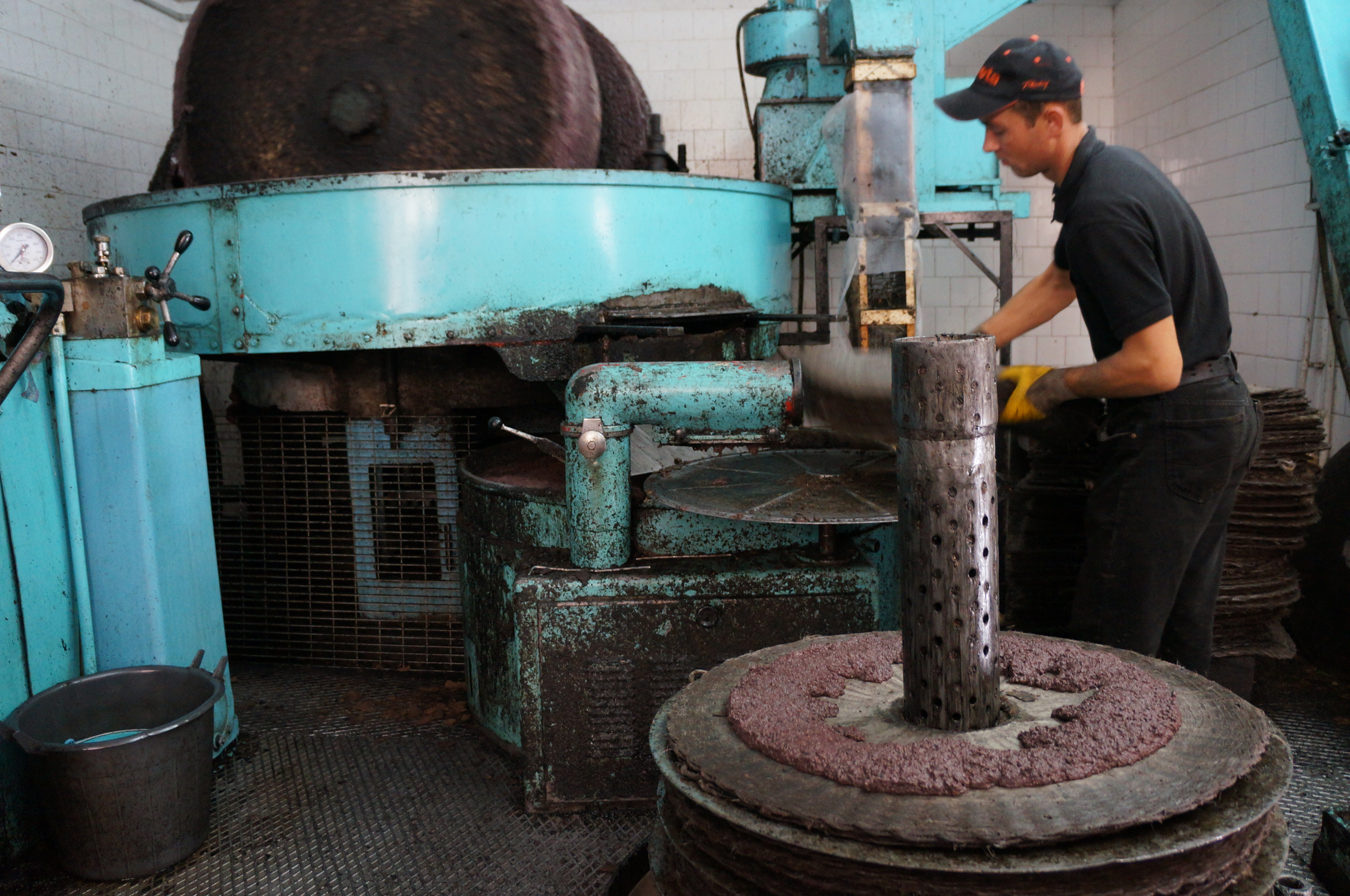
Olive paste after stone crushing is being applied to fiber mats in Sicily

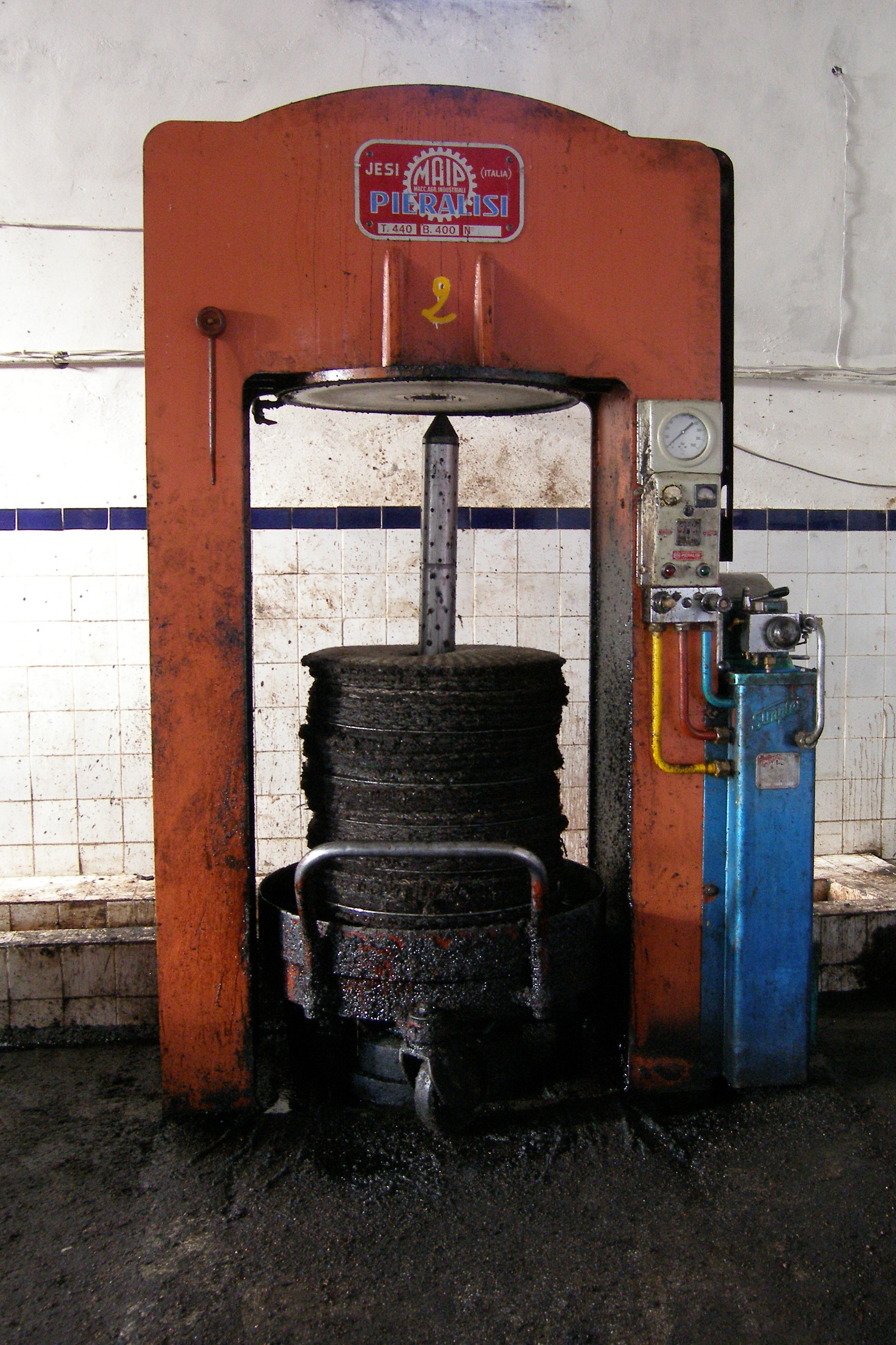
Modern press with stack of fiber disks

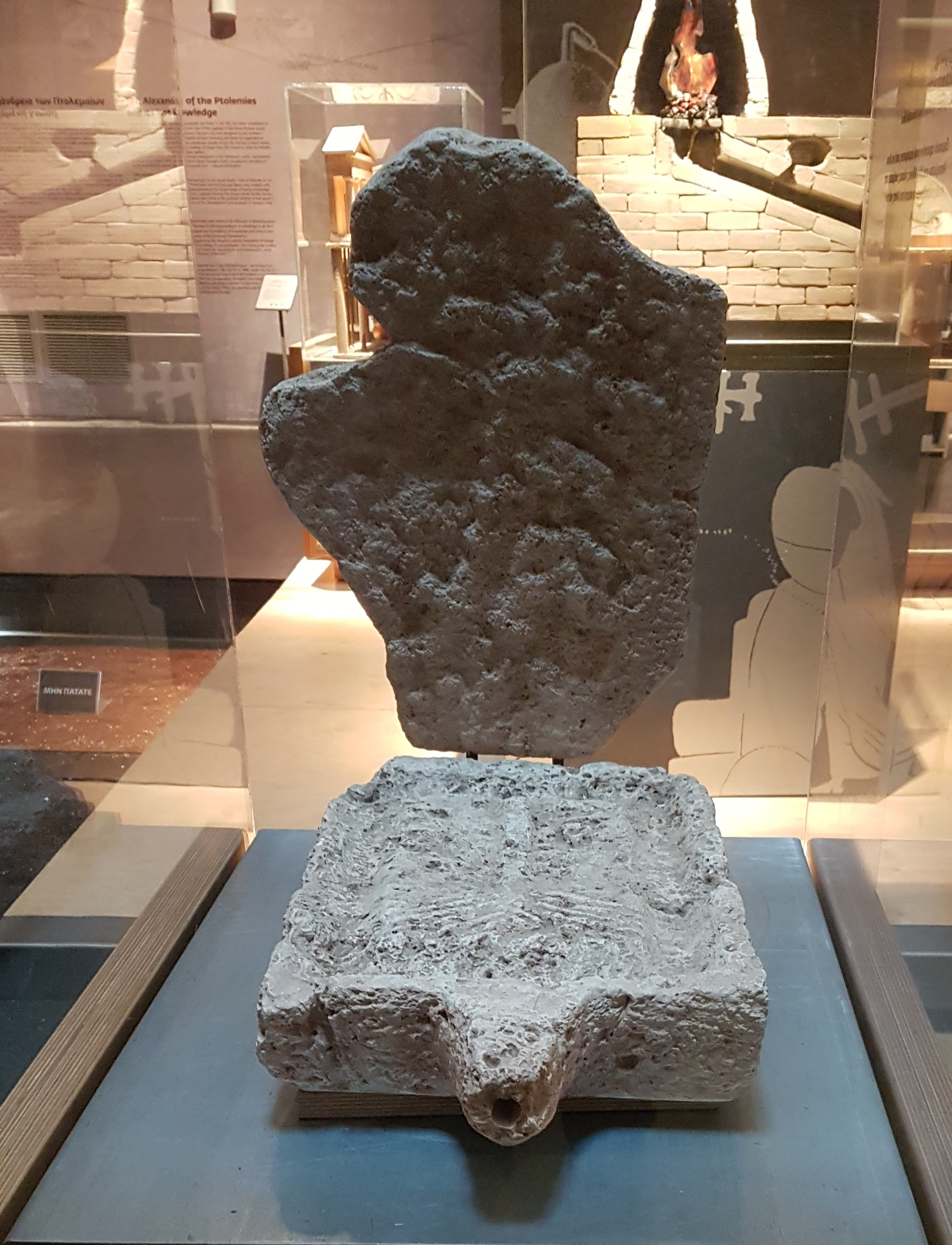
Reconstruction of an ancient Greek olive oil extractor

Roman era olive presses survive to the present time, with a notable collection present at Volubilis in Morocco but many others across the Mediterranean and Europe (e.g. Italy). An olive press works by applying pressure to olive paste to separate the liquid oil and vegetation water from the solid material. The oil and vegetation water are then separated by standard decantation.

Olive presses were traditionally built within walled structures. Traditional olive-presses consisted of a crushing basin which is a large, cylindrical millstone mounted by an upper milling-stone (crushing stone) used to grind the olives and their pits into a pulp. (Note: "The lower millstone, etc." Translation here follows the interpretation of the Hebrew words ים = yam, and ממל = memal, as explained by Mishnaic exegetes Hai Gaon (939–1038) on Mishnah (Taharot 10:8); Maimonides on Mishnah Baba Bathra 4:5 and in his Mishne Torah (Hil. Mekhirah 25:7) as pointed out by Rabbi Vidal of Tolosa; and by Nathan ben Jehiel (1035–1106) in his Sefer ha-Arukh, s.v. ממל; Obadiah Bartenura in his commentary on Mishnah (Maaserot 1:7), as well as by Moses Margolies (1715–1781) in his commentary P'nei Moshe on the Jerusalem Talmud (Baba Bathra 4:5), and by Nissim of Gerona on Rav Alfasi's commentary on Avodah Zarah 75a, among others. See also Amar, Z. (2015). Flora and Fauna in Maimonides' Teachings (in Hebrew). Kfar Darom: Makhon ha-torah we-ha-aretz shavei darom. p. 74. OCLC 783455868., s.v. זית) Formerly, the upper milling-stone was rotated by a beast of burden harnessed to a wooden beam, or horizontal shaft, and which turned the crushing stone. The draft animal which rotated the horizontal shaft was always blindfolded to prevent it from getting dizzy. After which, the pulp was collected and kneaded. It was then placed within frails (being no more than flexible, woven baskets made of thick fibrous material, usually of rushes, palm fronds, hemp or willow splints), stacked one on top of the other, to which was applied a stone weight to release the oil from the pulp. The extracted liquid which is obtained consists of oil and vegetable water (amurca = watery lees) mixed together, and runs off into a pit. After settling, the oil rises to the surface and is removed by way of decantation. Filtering the oil produces a clearer batch of oil. The olive residue that remained was used for lighting fires.

About 50–70 kilograms (110–155 pounds) of olives were spread within the [crushing] basin and crushed for 30-50 minutes. Sometimes water would be added to facilitate the movement of the crushing stone. From time to time a worker would push the olives into the path of the moving stone with a spade-like tool.

The following basic method is still widely used today, and remains a valid way of producing high quality olive oil if adequate precautions are taken.

First the olives are ground into an olive paste using large millstones at a corporate oil mill. The olive paste generally stays under the stones for 30–40 minutes. This has three objectives:

- Ensure that olives are well ground
- Allow enough time for the olive drops to join to form the largest droplets of oil
- Allow the fruit enzymes to produce some of the oil aromas and taste

In modern-day mills, after grinding, the olive paste is spread on fibre discs, which are stacked on top of each other, then placed into the mechanical press. In modern times, these discs are made of synthetic fibres which are easier to clean and maintain.

These discs are then put on a hydraulic piston, forming a pile. Pressure is applied on the disks, thus compacting the solid phase of the olive paste and percolating the liquid phases (oil and vegetation water). The applied hydraulic pressure can go to 400 atm. To facilitate separation of the liquid phases, water is run down the sides of the discs to increase the speed of percolation. The liquids are then separated either by a standard process of decantation or by means of a faster vertical centrifuge.

The traditional method is a valid form of producing high-quality olive oil, if after each extraction the discs are properly cleaned from the remains of paste; if not the leftover paste will begin to ferment, thereby producing inconsistencies of flavors (called defects) that will contaminate the subsequently produced olive oil. A similar problem can affect the grindstones that, in order to assure perfect quality, also require cleaning after each usage.

=== Grades of olive oil ===
In the ancient Levant, three methods were used to produce different grades of olive oil. The finest oil was produced from fully developed and ripe olives harvested solely from the apex of the tree, and lightly pressed, "for what flows from light pressure is very sweet and very thin." The remaining olives are pressed with a heavier weight, and vary in ripeness. Inferior oil is produced from unripe olives that are stored for extended periods of time until they grow soft or begin to shrivel to become more fit for grinding. Others are left for extended periods in pits in the ground to induce sweating and decay before they are ground. According to the Geoponica, salt and a little nitre are added when oil is stored. Traditionally, freshly collected olives were laid up within a large tub (Hebrew: מעטן) and sprinkled with salt before they were to be crushed in the mill, and which function served to heat-up the olives and to induce sweating, thereby bringing them to an advanced stage of ripeness, and make it easier to extract the oil once the olives are brought to the mill.

=== Advantages and disadvantages ===
Proper cleaning produces higher-quality oil. Grindstones, while ancient in design, are a suitable way to grind olives, because this method breaks up the drupe's pulp while only slightly touching the nut and the skin. This reduces the release of the oil oxidation enzymes present in these organs. In addition, in this extraction method, the introduction of water is minimal when compared to the modern one, thus reducing the washing-off of the polyphenols. The exhausted paste, called pomace, has a low content of water, making it an easier residue to manage.

Advantages

- Better grinding of the olives, reducing the release of oil oxidation enzymes
- Reduced added water, minimizing the washing of polyphenols
- Pomace with a low content of water easier to manage

Disadvantages

- Difficult to clean
- Non-continuous process with waiting periods thus exposes the olive paste to oxygen and light
- Requires more manual labor
- Longer production time from harvest to pressing

== Decanter centrifugation ==
The modern method of olive oil extraction uses an industrial decanter to separate all the phases by centrifugation. In this method the olives are crushed to a fine paste. This can be done by a hammer crusher, disc crusher, depitting machine or knife crusher. This paste is then malaxed for 30 to 60 minutes in order to allow the small olive droplets to agglomerate. The aromas are created in these two steps through the action of fruit enzymes.

Afterwards the paste is pumped into an industrial decanter where the phases will be separated. Water is added to facilitate the extraction process with the paste.

The decanter is a large capacity horizontal centrifuge rotating approximately 3,000 rpm, the high centrifugal force created allows the phases to be readily separated according to their different densities (solids > vegetation water > oil). Inside the decanter's rotating conical drum there is a coil that rotates more slowly, pushing the solid materials out of the system.

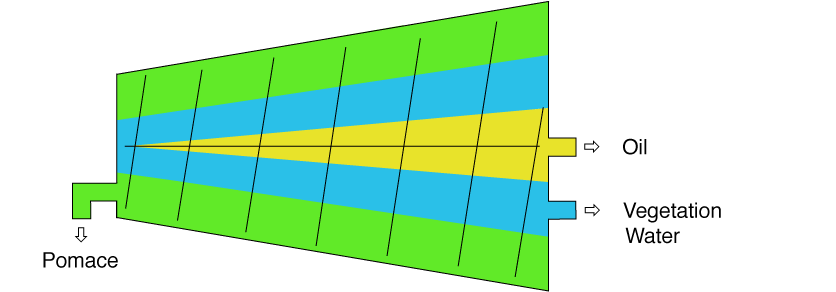
Diagram of a working decanter. The three phases are separated according to their densities.

The separated oil and vegetation water are then rerun through a vertical centrifuge, working around 6,000 rpm that will separate the small quantity of vegetation water still contained in oil and vice versa.

=== Three, two, and two and a half phases decanters ===
With the three phases oil decanter, a portion of the oil polyphenols is washed out due to the higher quantity of added water (when compared to the traditional method), producing a larger quantity of vegetation water that needs to be processed.

The two phases oil decanter was created as an attempt to solve these problems. Sacrificing part of its extraction capability, it uses less added water thus reducing the phenol washing. The olive paste is separated into two phases: oil and wet pomace. This type of decanter, instead of having three exits (oil, water, and solids), has only two. The water is expelled by the decanter coil together with the pomace, resulting in a wetter pomace that is much harder to process industrially. Many pomace oil extraction facilities refuse to work with these materials because the energy costs of drying the pomace for the hexane oil extraction often make the extraction process sub-economical. In practice, then, the two phases decanter solves the phenol washing problem but increases the residue management problem. This residue management problem has been reduced by the collection of this wetter pomace and being transported to specialized facilities called extractors which heat the pomace between 45 °C and 50 °C and can extract up to a further 2 litres per 100 kilos of pomace using adapted two-phase decanters.

The two-and-a-half-phase oil decanter is a compromise between the two previous types of decanters. It separates the olive paste into the standard three phases, but has a smaller need for added water and also a smaller vegetation water output. Therefore, the water content of the obtained pomace comes very close to that of the standard three-phase decanter, and the vegetation water output is relatively small, minimizing the residue management issues.

Depending on the olives and processing, the Decanter or Tricanter can extract between 85 and 90% of the olive oil in the 1st extraction. The yield from olive oil manufacture can be increased even further with a 2nd extraction. The olive oil yield increases to as much as 96% by combining the 1st and 2nd extractions.

=== Advantages and disadvantages ===
Advantages

- Compact machinery: only one decanter required
- Continuous and automated
- Limited labor required
- Highest percent of oil extraction
- Vegetable water disposal less of a problem
- Olive oil from two-phase centrifugation systems contains more phenols, tocopherols, trans‑2‑hexenal, and total aroma compounds and is more resistant to oxidation than oil from three-phase ones and from hydraulic presses

Disadvantages

- Expensive
- More technical labor required
- High energy consumption
- Pomace may end up moist
- Greater amount of vegetable water to be disposed of
- Reduced antioxidants due to added water
- Subject to wear from rocks, grit

== Sinolea method ==
The Sinolea method to extract oil from the olives was introduced in 1972; in this process, rows of metal discs or plates are dipped into the paste; the oil preferentially wets and sticks to the metal and is removed with scrapers in a continuous process. It is based on the different surface tension of the vegetation water and the oil, these different physical behaviors allow the olive oil to adhere to a steel plaque while the other two phases remain behind.

Sinolea works by continuously introducing several hundreds of steel plaques into the paste thus extracting the olive oil. This process is not completely efficient leaving a large quantity of oil still in the paste, so the remaining paste has to be processed by the standard modern method (industrial decanter).

=== Advantages and disadvantages ===
Advantages

- Higher polyphenol content of oil
- Low temperature method
- Automated
- Low labor
- Oil/water separation step is not needed
- Low energy requirement

Disadvantages

- Often must be combined with one of the above methods in order to maximize oil extraction which requires more space and labor
- Large surface areas can lead to rapid oxidation of the olive product
- Sale of future machines currently outlawed in the European Union due to difficulty in cleaning large surface areas

== First cold pressed – cold extraction ==
Many oils are marketed as first cold pressed or cold extraction. "Cold" means no heat is added during extraction. "Pressed" means that the olives are crushed in a mill to extract the oil.

In the EU, these designations are regulated by Article 5 of Commission Regulation (EC) No 1019/2002 of 13 June 2002 on marketing standards for olive oil. This article states that in order to use these designations the olive oil bottler must prove that the temperature of malaxation and extraction was under 27 °C (80 °F).

The temperature of malaxation and extraction is crucial due to its effect on olive oil quality. When high temperatures are applied, the more volatile polyphenols are lost and the rate of oil oxidation is increased, producing lower quality oils. In addition, the chemical content of polyphenols, antioxidants, and vitamins present in the oil is reduced by higher temperatures. The temperature is adjusted basically by controlling the temperature of the water added during these two steps. High temperatures are used to increase the yield of olive oil obtained from the paste.

== Alternative configurations ==
Some producers, in order to maximise product quality, choose to combine the traditional grinding method, the stone mill, with a modern decanter. This technique produces more selective grinding of the olives, reduces the malaxation time of the olive paste, and avoids the complicated cleaning of fibre disks. Because the use of the stone mill requires a loading and unloading phase, this extraction method is discontinuous, i.e., there are times when all the machinery is stopped, therefore it is generally not used on a large commercial scale, being applied only by small scale olive mills producing high quality olive oil.

== Consumer point of view ==
High quality olive oil can be obtained by all the methods if proper measures are taken. Olive oil quality is equally dependent on the quality of the olives themselves and on the time they have to wait from harvesting to extraction, in addition to the extraction method itself.

The two main agents that cause the degradation of olive oil are oxygen and light. Once an olive is harvested, it should be pressed within 24 hours. Oxidation begins immediately upon harvesting. In the period between harvest and grinding, the fruits' enzymes are very active and increasingly degrade the endogenous oil, and therefore oil obtained after a longer wait is of lower quality, presenting higher acidity (free fatty acids percentage).

In addition, if additional oxygen is allowed to interact with the olive paste during the extraction process, the acidity level will increase further. Sealed extraction methods are best to prevent the continued introduction of oxygen, as well as light to the oil.

After extraction is complete, in most cases unfiltered olive oil appears somewhat cloudy, mainly due to the presence of minute amounts of water and suspended solids of olive pulp and seed. This type of oil is therefore sometimes called cloudy or veiled olive oil.

It is common practice that unfiltered olive oils are then "racked" for a time, i.e. stored in cool stainless steel silos with a conical bottom that are pumped free of oxygen to enable the precipitation and separation of the two phases and facilitate later filtration; it will also contribute in the integrity and stability of the oil.

== Future prospects ==
The future of olive extraction points to reducing the negative aspects of the present methods, decreasing the degradation produced by the extraction process in itself.

- Reducing the oxidation by performing part of the process of malaxation and the extraction under a controlled nitrogen atmosphere
- Extracting the nut of the olive before grinding, this will reduce the release of oxidative enzymes present in this organ, and yield a pomace that is free from wood residues, making it possible to be used in animal feeding
- Reducing the addition of water to minimize the washing of polyphenols
- Improving the Sinolea method, through an increase in the efficiency of the adsorption of the oil to the plates, thus reducing the need for the use of standard methods of extraction

== See also ==
- Amurca, a byproduct in olive oil extraction, historically used for many purposes
- Avitsur, S. (1994). "Olive oil production in the land of Israel: traditional to industrial." In: History and Technology of Olive Oil in the Holy Land, Eretz Israel Museum, Tel Aviv, pp. 91–158
- Dalman, Gustaf (1964). "Bread, Oil and Wine". Arbeit und Sitte in Palästina (Work and Customs in Palestine) (in German). Vol. 4. Hildesheim. OCLC 312676221. (reprinted from 1935 edition)

== Bibliography ==
- "Polyphenols in olive oils". T. Gutfinger, Journal of the American Oil Chemists' Society, Volume 58, Number 11, 966–968, doi:10.1007/BF02659771
