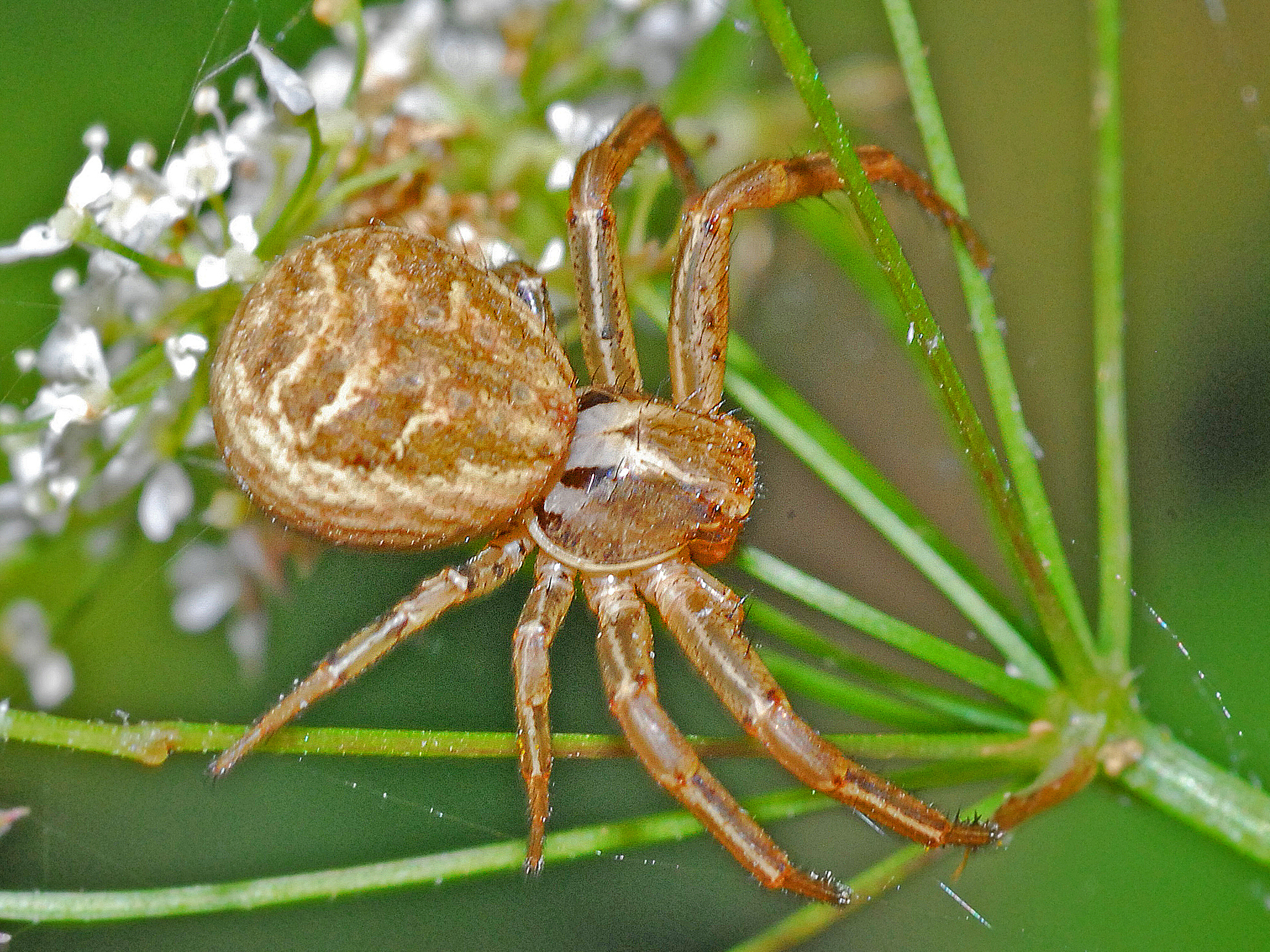
- Female
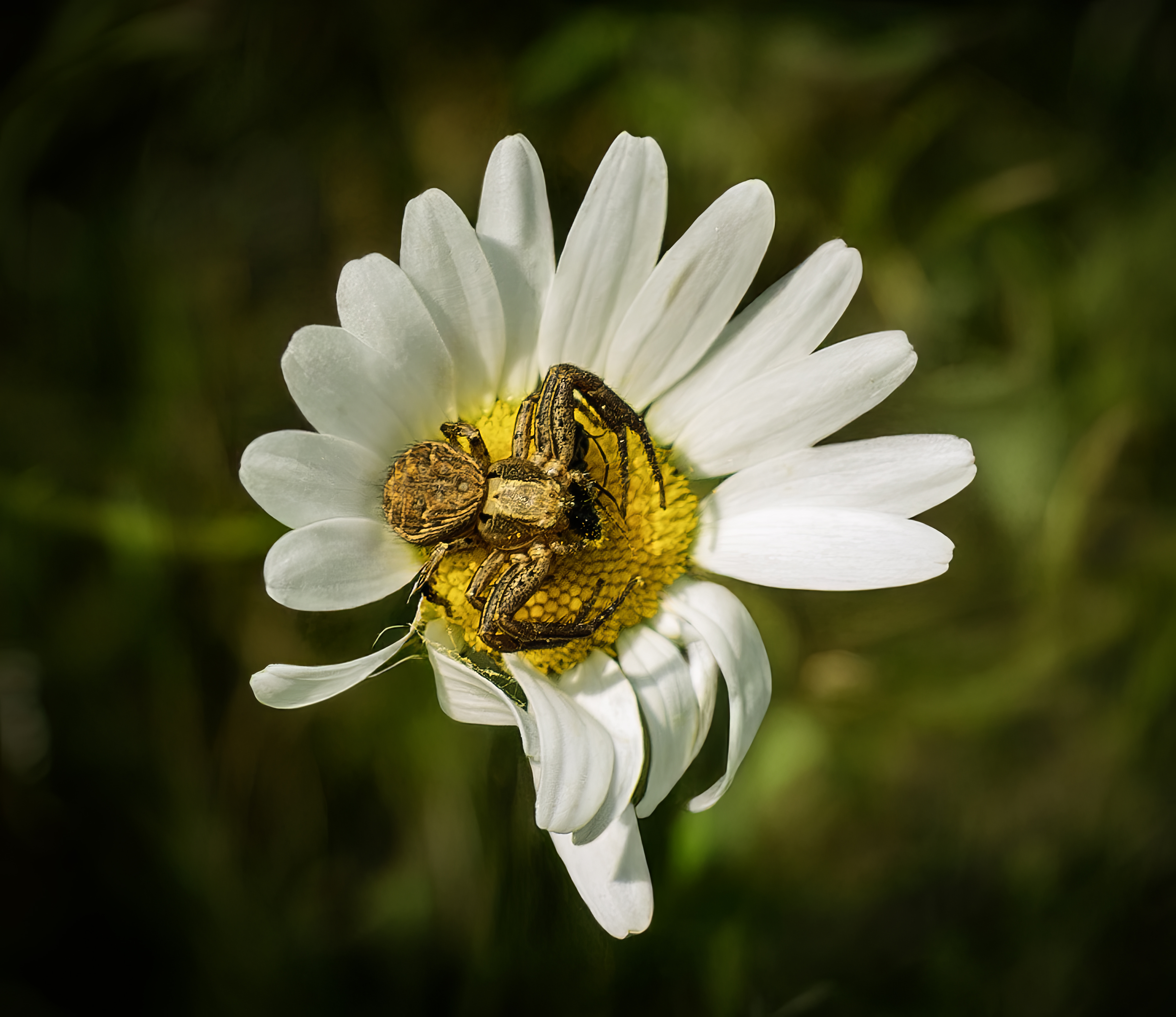
- Male with prey

Scientific classification
- Kingdom: Animalia
- Phylum: Arthropoda
- Subphylum: Chelicerata
- Class: Arachnida
- Order: Araneae
- Infraorder: Araneomorphae
- Family: Thomisidae
- Genus: Xysticus
- Species: X. cristatus

Binomial name
- Xysticus cristatus (Clerck, 1757)

Synonyms
- List: Araneus cristatus Clerck, 1757; Aranea viatica Linnaeus, 1758; Aranea nasuta Martini & Goeze, 1778; Aranea fasciata Fourcroy, 1785; Aranea horticola Olivier, 1789; Aranea cristata (Clerck, 1757); Aranea liturata Fabricius, 1793; Aranea subreptans Strack, 1810; Thomisus viaticus (Linnaeus, 1758); Thomisus cristatus (Clerck, 1757); Xysticus viaticus (Linnaeus, 1758); Xysticus augur Strand, 1900; Xysticus sexangulatus Strand, 1900

= Xysticus cristatus =

Species of spider

Xysticus cristatus, the common crab spider, is a European spider from the family Thomisidae.

== Description ==
The adults of Xysticus cristatus can reach a body length of about 6–8 mm (0.24–0.31 in) in the female, of about 3–5 mm (0.12–0.20 in) in the smaller male. The colour varies from light cream, dark brown to greyish. It is much darker in males, with contrasting designs. In both sexes the carapace shows a broad whitish median band containing a brown triangle facing the back and ending with a sharp, black apical macula. The dorsum (upper surface) of the opisthosoma has a dark leaf pattern with white edges and light transverse stripes on the right and left. This cryptic colouration is used to blend in with its normal environment of dried leaves. The common name crab spider arises because they sometimes move in a crab-like way, from side to side.

== Habitat ==
Xysticus cristatus is usually found in low vegetation, often on the ground. It is shade intolerant and avoids woodland and closed canopy habitats but it is otherwise found in almost every habitat type.

== Biology ==
Xysticus cristatus is an ambush hunter which spends much time sitting still, with its fore-legs spread wide, waiting for insects to blunder into them. In grass it adopts a flexible hunting position either at the tips of vegetation, such as flowerheads, or on the ground surface and as a result, the prey taken is varied and is made up of flying insects, including bees and butterflies.

When it hunts on the ground the food tends to consist of ants, spiders and other soft-bodied prey. It often takes prey much larger than itself. In Great Britain spiderlings balloon, most often between the months of July to September. Active adults have been recorded from February to December, with a peak of male activity in May and June.

To mate the male grasps one of the female's legs, holding on until she ceases to struggle, he then uses silk to tie her down on the ground and then he crawls underneath her and mates. After mating, female builds a flat white ovisac containing the developing eggs, usually fixed on the plants. Then the female sits on it to protect it, until myriad little spiders are released.

In Britain Xysticus cristatus has been observed as a prey item for the spider wasp Dipogon bifasciatus.

== Distribution ==
The species has a Palearctic distribution, being found throughout Europe (including Iceland) to South Siberia, Turkey, Caucasus, Russia, Kazakhstan, Iran, Central Asia, China, Korea, Japan. It has been introduced to Canada and United States.
