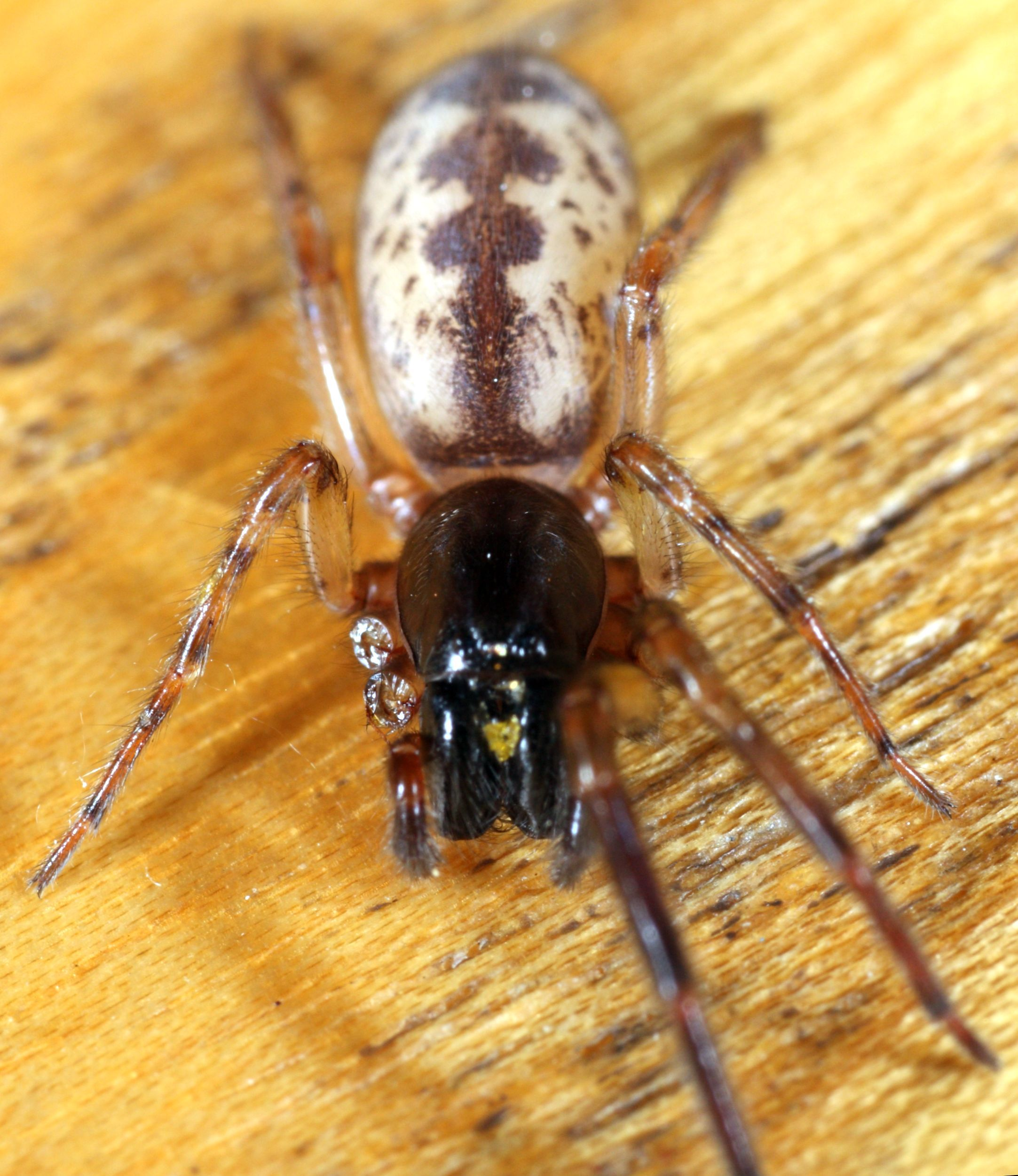

Scientific classification
- Kingdom: Animalia
- Phylum: Arthropoda
- Subphylum: Chelicerata
- Class: Arachnida
- Order: Araneae
- Infraorder: Araneomorphae
- Family: Segestriidae
- Genus: Segestria
- Species: S. senoculata

Binomial name
- Segestria senoculata (Linnaeus, 1758)

Synonyms
- Aranea senoculata; Aranea scopulorum; Segestria corvulus; Segestria krausi

= Segestria senoculata =

Snake-back spider

Species of spider

Segestria senoculata, sometimes known as the snake-back spider, is a species of spider belonging to the family Segestriidae. It has a Palearctic distribution.

The common names of this species (which has a body length of around 9 mm) refer to a row of black spots along the back of the grey abdomen which are thought to resemble the pattern found on some snakes. However, on some specimens these markings fuse to form a solid band. The carapace is shiny dark brown and elongated and the legs are pale brown with darker ringing.

As with other members of this family, this spider makes a tubular web in a crevice and darts out to catch prey which crosses trip lines which fan out from the tube's entrance.

Segestria senoculata is the only recorded prey for the Pepsid spider wasp Dipogon subintermedius in Great Britain.
