= Malaxation =

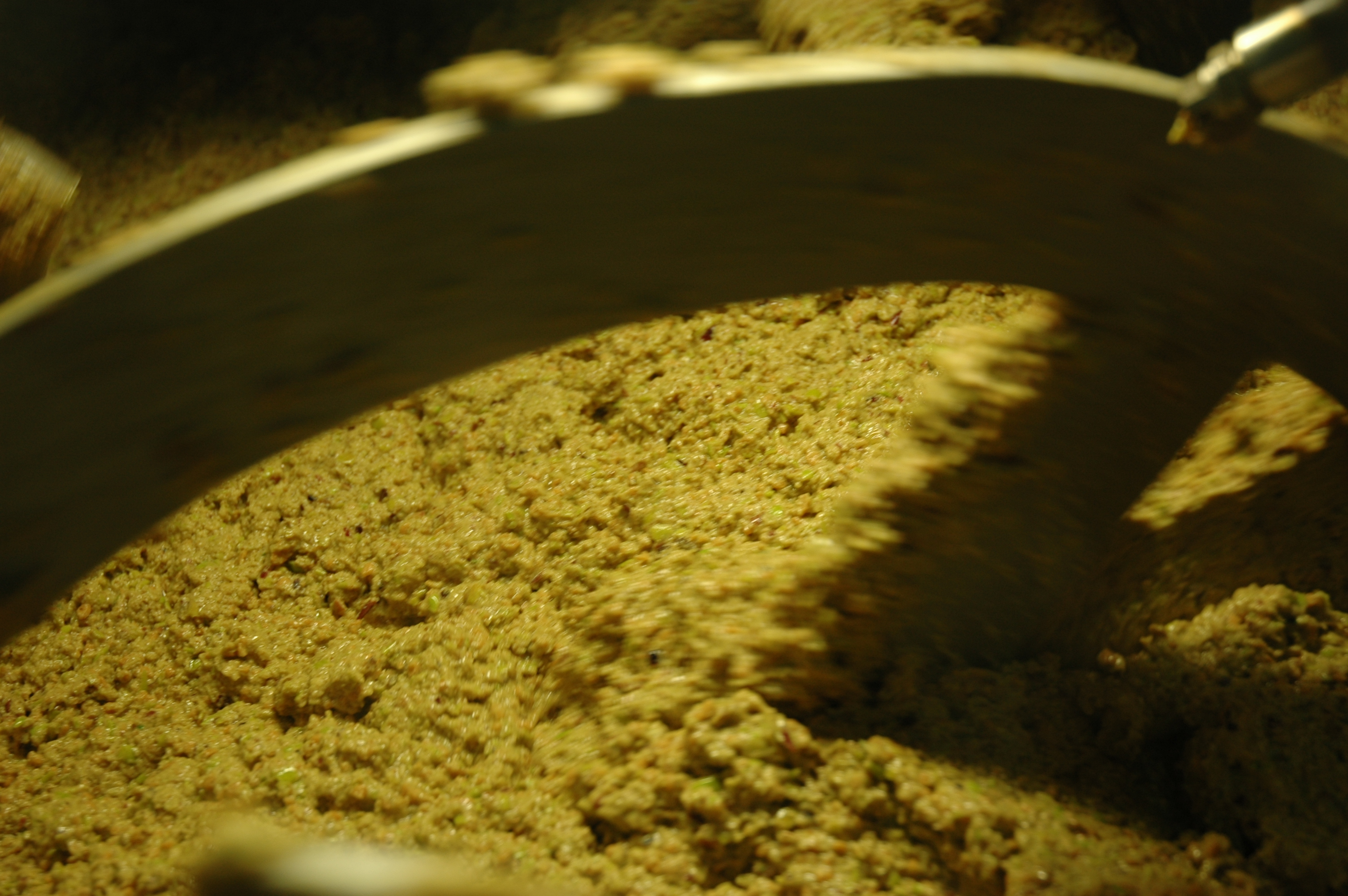
Malaxation of olive paste in a malaxating mill

Malaxation (sometimes malaxate or malax) refers to the action of kneading, rubbing or massaging a substance to softness. The term is applied differently in various fields. The term "malaxator" may refer to a malaxating mill or to a substance added to assist in the process.

== Etymology ==
The word derives from 17th - 18th century Latin malaxare, related to Greek μαλακος (malakos) meaning "soft".

== Agriculture ==
In olive oil extraction, malaxation is the action of slowly churning or mixing milled olives, typically for 20 to 40 minutes. The churning allows the smaller droplets of oil released by the milling process to aggregate and be more easily separated. The paste is normally heated to around 27 °C during this process. Oil yield is proportional to the temperature and mixing time. However, the use of higher temperatures and longer mixing times increases oxidation of the oil and therefore decreases shelf life, so a compromise must be struck. Also, the usage of higher temperatures does not allow for the labelling of the oil as "cold extracted", a term used widely in marketing, especially in the European Union.

It is now possible with newer equipment to use a blanket of inert gas such as nitrogen or carbon dioxide over the olive paste, which greatly reduces oxidation. This allows for an increased yield without compromising the quality of the oil.

After malaxation is complete, the paste is sent to a phase separator. Nearly all producers use a decanter centrifuge for this process. Traditionally, the olive oil was separated from the paste using a large press that was either screwed down or weighted with rocks.

== Entomology ==
In entomology malaxation refers most often to processes of kneading or chewing for softening something. Typical use of the word is in referring to chewing prey to prepare it for consumption by larvae. This is most often done by certain hunting wasps. If the prey survives at all, its nervous system and muscles are likely to suffer such damage that it poses no threat to the larva.

== Massage and physiotherapy ==
In massage, malaxation refers to kneading techniques aimed at "softening" or relaxing muscles, especially to relieve hard spasms.

== Pharmacology ==
In pharmacology, the kneading and squeezing of ingredients into a mass for making pills and plasters. A mill for such processes is called a malaxator. When a substance such as a thinning agent, solvent or lubricating agent is added to assist in the softening process, the added material often is called a malaxator as well.
