= Cheiracanthium abbreviatum =

Scientific classification
- Kingdom: Animalia
- Phylum: Arthropoda
- Subphylum: Chelicerata
- Class: Arachnida
- Order: Araneae
- Infraorder: Araneomorphae
- Family: Cheiracanthiidae
- Genus: Cheiracanthium
- Species: C. abbreviatum

Binomial name
- Cheiracanthium abbreviatum Simon, 1878

Species of spider

Cheiracanthium abbreviatum is a spider species found in France and Denmark.

The species was first described in 1878 by Eugène Simon, based on a single female specimen caught in the dunes of Cap Ferret under Mediterranean strawflower (Helichrysum stoechas) shrubbery. Simon described the species as being very similar to Cheiracanthium erraticum, but with differences in the femoral spines of the fourth leg as well as abdominal banding.
