= Cheiracanthium rupestre =

Scientific classification
- Kingdom: Animalia
- Phylum: Arthropoda
- Subphylum: Chelicerata
- Class: Arachnida
- Order: Araneae
- Infraorder: Araneomorphae
- Family: Cheiracanthiidae
- Genus: Cheiracanthium
- Species: C. rupestre

Binomial name
- Cheiracanthium rupestre Herman, 1879

Species of spider

Cheiracanthium rupestre is a spider species found in Hungary.
