= Cheiracanthium antungense =

Scientific classification
- Domain: Eukaryota
- Kingdom: Animalia
- Phylum: Arthropoda
- Subphylum: Chelicerata
- Class: Arachnida
- Order: Araneae
- Infraorder: Araneomorphae
- Family: Cheiracanthiidae
- Genus: Cheiracanthium
- Species: C. antungense

Binomial name
- Cheiracanthium antungense Chen et Huang, 2012

Species of spider

Cheiracanthium antungense, commonly known in Mandarin Chinese as "安通紅螯蛛" or Antong red chelate spider, is a species of yellow sac spider in the family Cheiracanthiidae. It is endemic to the low mountain areas in eastern Taiwan.

== Description ==
Cheiracanthium antungense are distinguished from the similar Cheiracanthium filiapophysium by their wide, sickle-shaped tibial apophysis and lack of a median apophysis on the male pedipalp. Their carapace is yellowish brown, with no thoracic groove. Their chelicerae and maxilla are brown. They have a pale yellow abdomen, with a pale grayish brown pattern.

== Etymology ==
The name of C. antungense is derived from Antung, a village in Eastern Taiwan included in their range.
