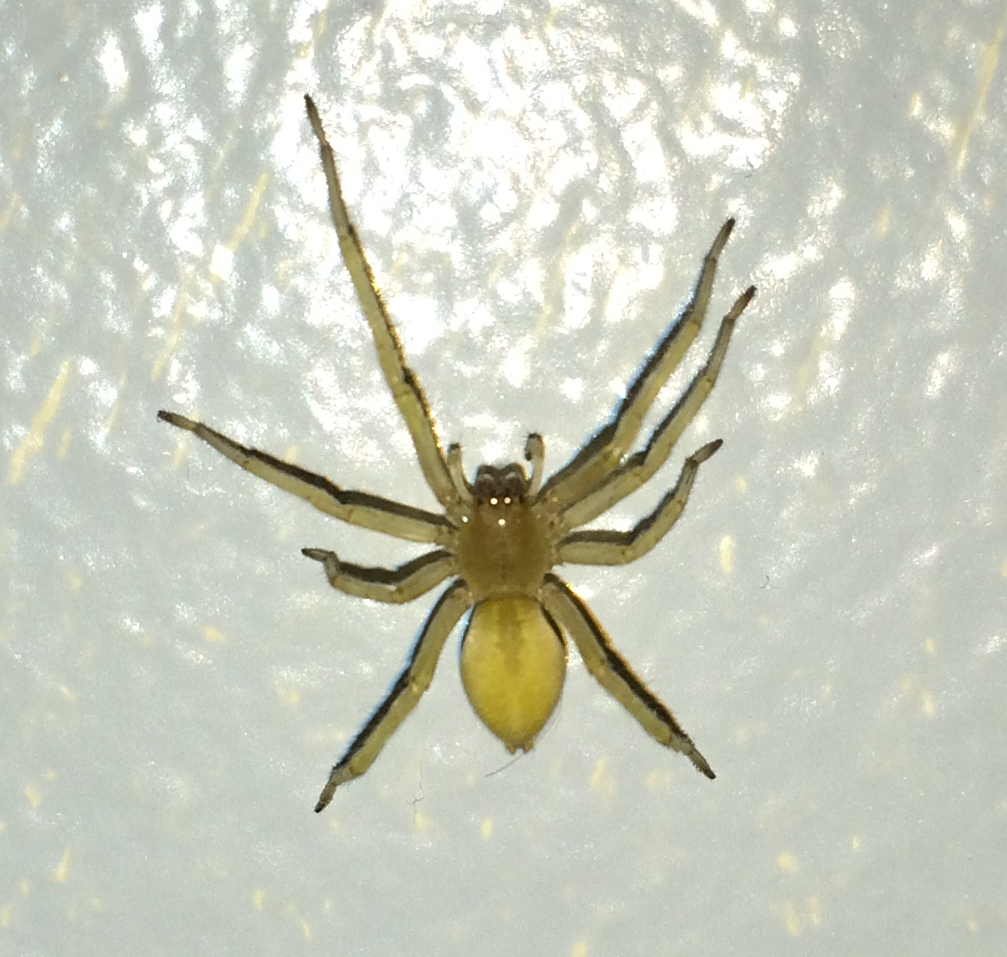
- Inside a house in southeast Michigan during the winter

Scientific classification
- Kingdom: Animalia
- Phylum: Arthropoda
- Subphylum: Chelicerata
- Class: Arachnida
- Order: Araneae
- Infraorder: Araneomorphae
- Family: Cheiracanthiidae
- Genus: Cheiracanthium
- Species: C. inclusum

Binomial name
- Cheiracanthium inclusum (Hentz, 1847)

Synonyms
- Clubiona inclusa Clubiona subflava Cheiracanthium lanipes Cheiracanthium edentulum Clubiona melanostoma Cheiracanthium keyserlingii Cheiracanthium subflavum Cheiracanthium ragazzii Cheiracanthium viride Cheiracanthium ferum Cheiracanthium debile Eutichurus frontalis Cheiracanthium popayanse Cheiracanthium gracilipes Cheiracanthium africanum Chiracanthops mandibularis Matidia haplogyna Radulphius seminermis Cheiracanthium leitaoi Cheiracanthium melloi Radulphius brachyapophysis Cheiracanthium nigropalpatum

= Cheiracanthium inclusum =

Species of spider

Cheiracanthium inclusum, alternately known as the black-footed yellow sac spider or the American yellow sac spider (in order to distinguish it from its European cousin C. punctorium), was formerly classified as a true sac spider (of the family Clubionidae), and then placed in the family Miturgidae, but now belongs to family Cheiracanthiidae. It is a rather small pale yellow species that is indigenous to the Americas. It is often found living in the foliage of forests and gardens but also can inhabit human homes. Despite common beliefs of necrosis, Cheiracanthium bites cause only localized swelling. C. inclusum is closely related to Cheiracanthium mildei, an introduced species native to Europe which is similar in appearance and natural history and can also be found in North American homes.

== Identification ==
Like all spiders, C. inclusum has two body segments: a cephalothorax (fused head and thorax) and an abdomen. In females, the body measures between 5 and 9 mm and in males, 4 to 8 mm. The leg span however can be up to 1 inch (2.5 cm) with the front pair of legs being longer than the other 3 pairs. Males tend to have a narrower body and a larger leg span than females. C. inclusum gets its two common names (yellow sac and black-footed spider) from its appearance. It is a pale yellow-beige colour with dark brown markings on its palps, chelicerae (jaws) and on the ends of its tarsi (feet). There is also often an orange-brown stripe running down the top-centre of its abdomen. C. inclusum has 8 similarly sized eyes, distributed in 2 parallel horizontal rows. However, ocular input is of minor importance, due to the absence of light during the spider's nocturnal activities. The spider relies more on its palps, sensory structures just behind the chelicerae, on the prosoma (cephalothorax), to sense its environment.

== Natural history ==
=== Distribution ===
C. inclusum are native to the New World (North, Central, and South America; and West Indies). This species has also been introduced to Africa and Réunion. They are most often found in trees and shrubs, but may also find shelter in houses and other human-made structures.

=== Life cycle ===
Females of C. inclusum mate only once, and produce their first egg mass about 14 days after mating. Two sets of eggs are usually produced, but this can range anywhere from 1 to 5. Egg masses generally contain 17 to 85 eggs, although as many as 112 eggs have been reported in a single egg mass. Egg laying generally occurs during the months of June and July; during this period, females lay their eggs in small (2 cm) silk tubes and enclose themselves with the eggs, protecting them from predators. Females stay with the eggs and juvenile spiders for about 17 days – until their first complete molt. Females which produce additional egg masses construct a second egg sac about two weeks after the juvenile spiders disperse. Males tend to become sexually mature earlier (119 days on average) than females (134 days on average), but time to maturity can range from 65 to 273 days, depending on a number of factors, such as temperature, humidity and photoperiod. C. inclusum spiders normally over-winter as adults or sub-adults.

=== Behavior ===
Being nocturnal, C. inclusum feed and mate at night. C. inclusum do not make webs to catch prey; instead, they are active predators, feeding on a variety of arthropods such as insects and other spiders. Prey detection may involve detection of mechanical vibrations of the substrate, and vision seems to play an insignificant role. During the day, they retreat in small silk nests similar to those used for reproduction. A new nest, which may be completely closed, open on one side, or open on both sides, is built every day in under 10 minutes.

C. inclusum are known to disperse easily between trees and shrubs. They do this by excreting a long silk thread that gets carried by the wind and sticks to a nearby structure, forming a scaffold between two structures. Alternatively, the spider may stay attached to the thread and balloon through the air. These spiders can travel vertically attached to a silk string, which they use in order to both catch airborne prey, and keep out of reach of other predators, such as larger spiders, centipedes or ants.

== Human impact ==
C. inclusum spiders are venomous and capable of biting humans. A bite begins with moderate pain followed by itching. Symptoms usually resolve within 7–10 days. However, the spider rarely bites (with females biting more often than wandering males), and the venom rarely produces more than local symptoms.
