= Cheiracanthium campestre =

Scientific classification
- Kingdom: Animalia
- Phylum: Arthropoda
- Subphylum: Chelicerata
- Class: Arachnida
- Order: Araneae
- Infraorder: Araneomorphae
- Family: Cheiracanthiidae
- Genus: Cheiracanthium
- Species: C. campestre

Binomial name
- Cheiracanthium campestre Lohmander, 1944

Species of spider

Cheiracanthium campestre is a spider species found in Sweden, Denmark, Central Europe, Italy, Romania, Ukraine, and Russia.
