= Cheiracanthium schenkeli =

Schenkel's Sac Spider

Conservation status
- Least Concern (SANBI Red List)

Scientific classification
- Kingdom: Animalia
- Phylum: Arthropoda
- Subphylum: Chelicerata
- Class: Arachnida
- Order: Araneae
- Infraorder: Araneomorphae
- Family: Cheiracanthiidae
- Genus: Cheiracanthium
- Species: C. schenkeli

Binomial name
- Cheiracanthium schenkeli Caporiacco, 1949

Species of spider

Cheiracanthium schenkeli is a species of spider in the family Cheiracanthiidae. It is an African endemic originally described from Kenya and is known from six African countries.

== Distribution ==
In South Africa, the species is recorded from three provinces including four protected areas, at elevations from 3-1094 m above sea level.

== Habitat ==
This species is a free-living plant dweller that constructs silk retreats in rolled-up leaves. It has been sampled from the Indian Ocean Coastal Belt and Savanna biomes.

== Conservation ==
Due to its wide geographical range, it is listed as Least Concern. The species is protected in Ndumo Game Reserve, iSimangaliso Wetland Park, Lhuvhondo Nature Reserve and Blouberg Nature Reserve.
