= Cheiracanthium oncognathum =

Scientific classification
- Kingdom: Animalia
- Phylum: Arthropoda
- Subphylum: Chelicerata
- Class: Arachnida
- Order: Araneae
- Infraorder: Araneomorphae
- Family: Cheiracanthiidae
- Genus: Cheiracanthium
- Species: C. oncognathum

Binomial name
- Cheiracanthium oncognathum Thorell, 1871

Species of spider

Cheiracanthium oncognathum is a spider species found in Europe.
