= Cheiracanthium shiluvanense =

Shiluvane Sac Spider

Scientific classification
- Kingdom: Animalia
- Phylum: Arthropoda
- Subphylum: Chelicerata
- Class: Arachnida
- Order: Araneae
- Infraorder: Araneomorphae
- Family: Cheiracanthiidae
- Genus: Cheiracanthium
- Species: C. shiluvanense

Binomial name
- Cheiracanthium shiluvanense Lotz, 2007

Species of spider

Cheiracanthium shiluvanense is a species of spider in the family Cheiracanthiidae. It is a South African endemic described from Shiluvane, near Leydsdorp in Limpopo.

== Distribution ==
The species is known from two provinces from only a few localities at elevations from 229-709 m above sea level.

== Habitat ==
This species is a free-living plant dweller that constructs silk retreats in rolled-up leaves. It has been sampled from the Savanna Biome.

== Conservation ==
The species is listed as Data Deficient because more sampling is needed to collect males and determine its full range. It is recorded from Ithala Game Reserve.
