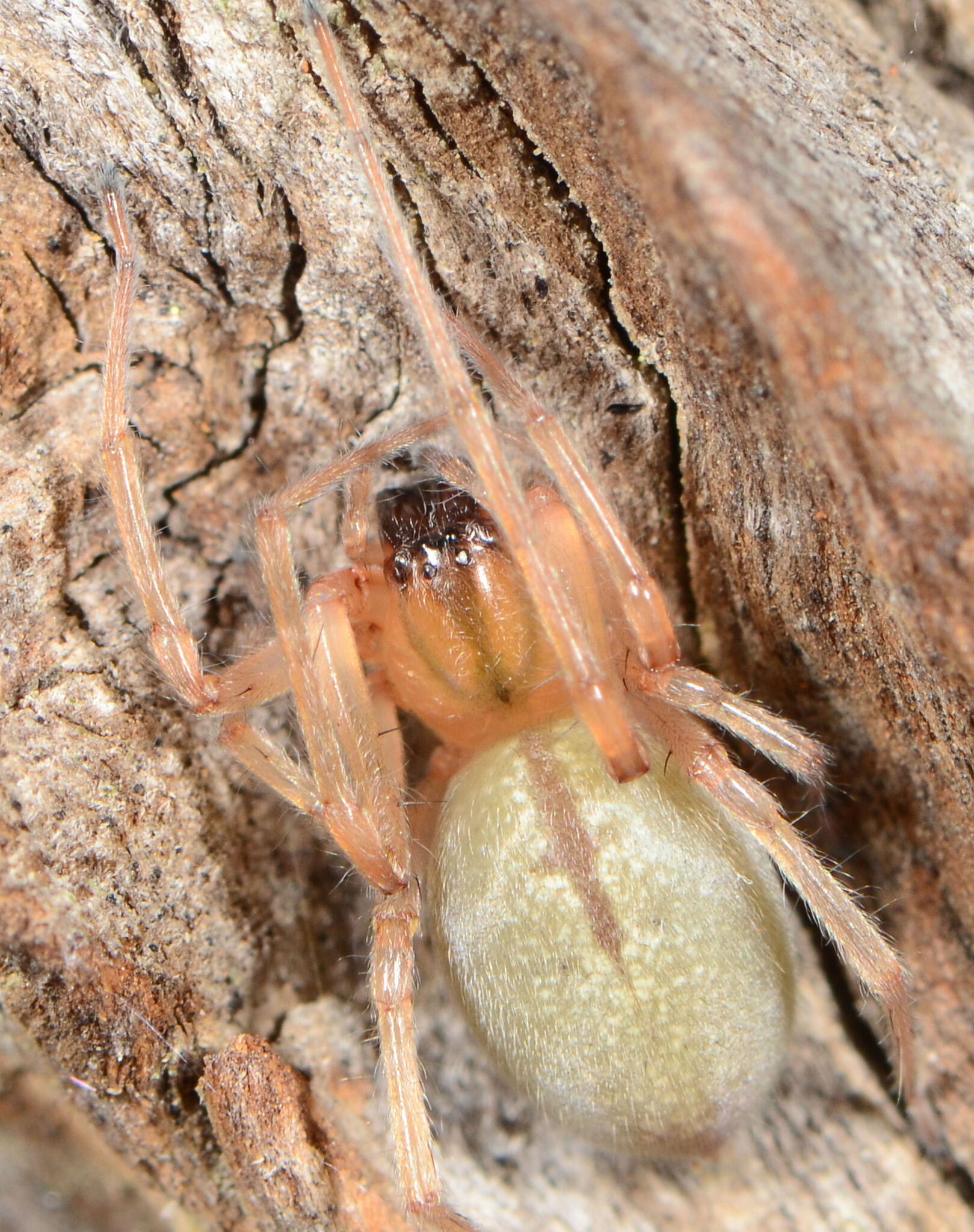
- Adult female

Scientific classification
- Kingdom: Animalia
- Phylum: Arthropoda
- Subphylum: Chelicerata
- Class: Arachnida
- Order: Araneae
- Infraorder: Araneomorphae
- Family: Cheiracanthiidae
- Genus: Cheiracanthium
- Species: C. aculeatum

Binomial name
- Cheiracanthium aculeatum Simon, 1884

Synonyms
- Cheiracanthium natalense Lessert, 1923

= Cheiracanthium aculeatum =

Sudan Sac Spider

Species of spider

Cheiracanthium aculeatum is a species of spider in the family Cheiracanthiidae. It is an African endemic originally described from Sudan and is known from seven African countries.

== Distribution ==
In South Africa, the species is recorded from five provinces at elevations from 17-1649 m above sea level.

== Habitat ==
The species is a free-living plant dweller that constructs silk retreats in rolled-up leaves. It has been sampled from the Grassland, Indian Ocean Coastal Belt and Savanna biomes.

== Conservation ==
Due to its wide geographical range, it is listed as Least Concern. The species is protected in four protected areas including Roodeplaatdam Nature Reserve, Kruger National Park, and Lekgalameetse Nature Reserve.
