= Cheiracanthium taprobanense =

Scientific classification
- Kingdom: Animalia
- Phylum: Arthropoda
- Subphylum: Chelicerata
- Class: Arachnida
- Order: Araneae
- Infraorder: Araneomorphae
- Family: Cheiracanthiidae
- Genus: Cheiracanthium
- Species: C. taprobanense

Binomial name
- Cheiracanthium taprobanense Strand, 1907

Species of spider

Cheiracanthium taprobanense is a species of spider of the family Cheiracanthiidae. It is endemic to Sri Lanka.
