= Cheiracanthium gratum =

Scientific classification
- Kingdom: Animalia
- Phylum: Arthropoda
- Subphylum: Chelicerata
- Class: Arachnida
- Order: Araneae
- Infraorder: Araneomorphae
- Family: Cheiracanthiidae
- Genus: Cheiracanthium
- Species: C. gratum

Binomial name
- Cheiracanthium gratum Kulczynski, 1897

Species of spider

Cheiracanthium gratum is a spider species found in Germany and Hungary. It is pale yellow, with males growing to 5.6-6.5 mm in length and females 6.7-7 mm.
