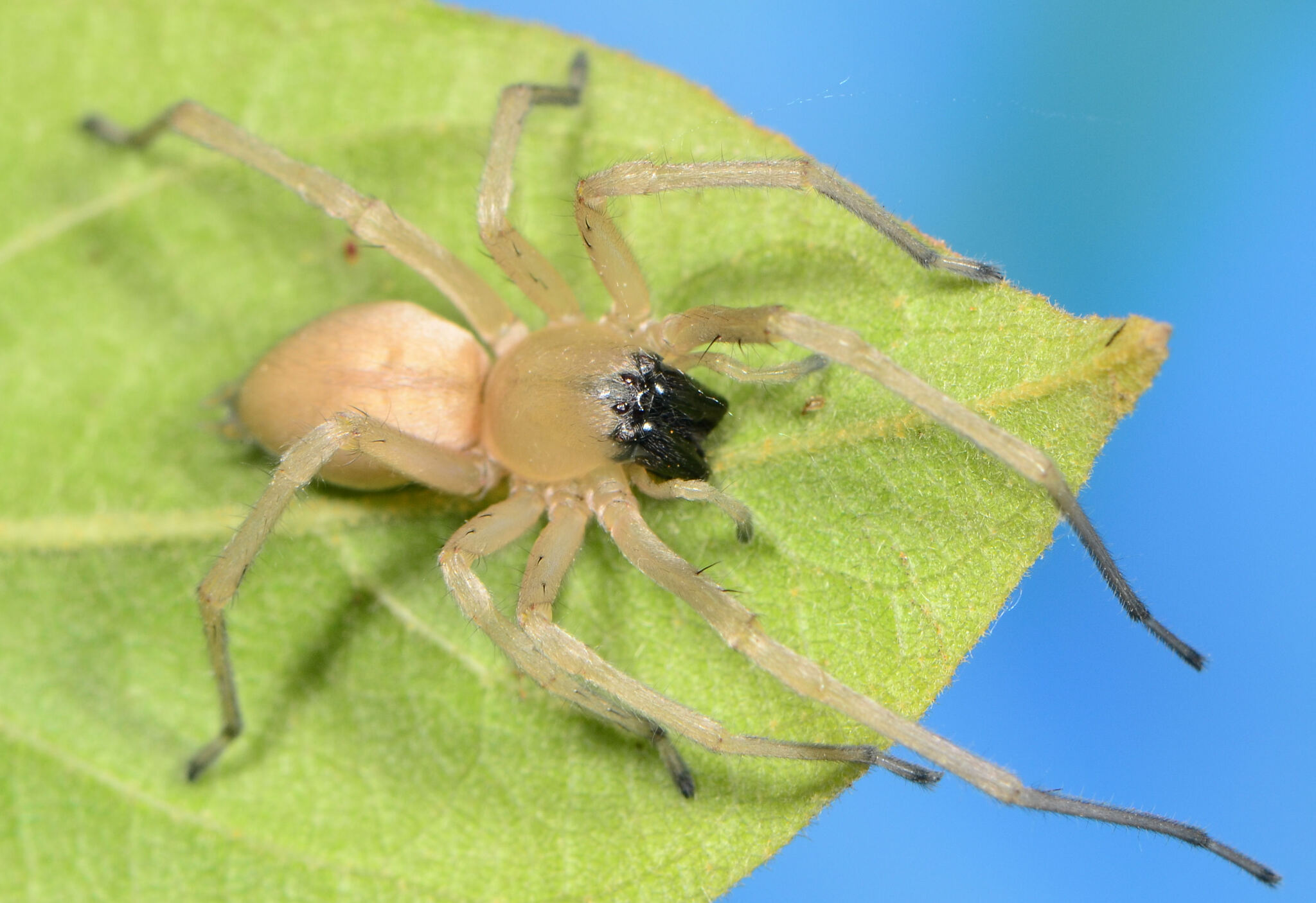
- Female
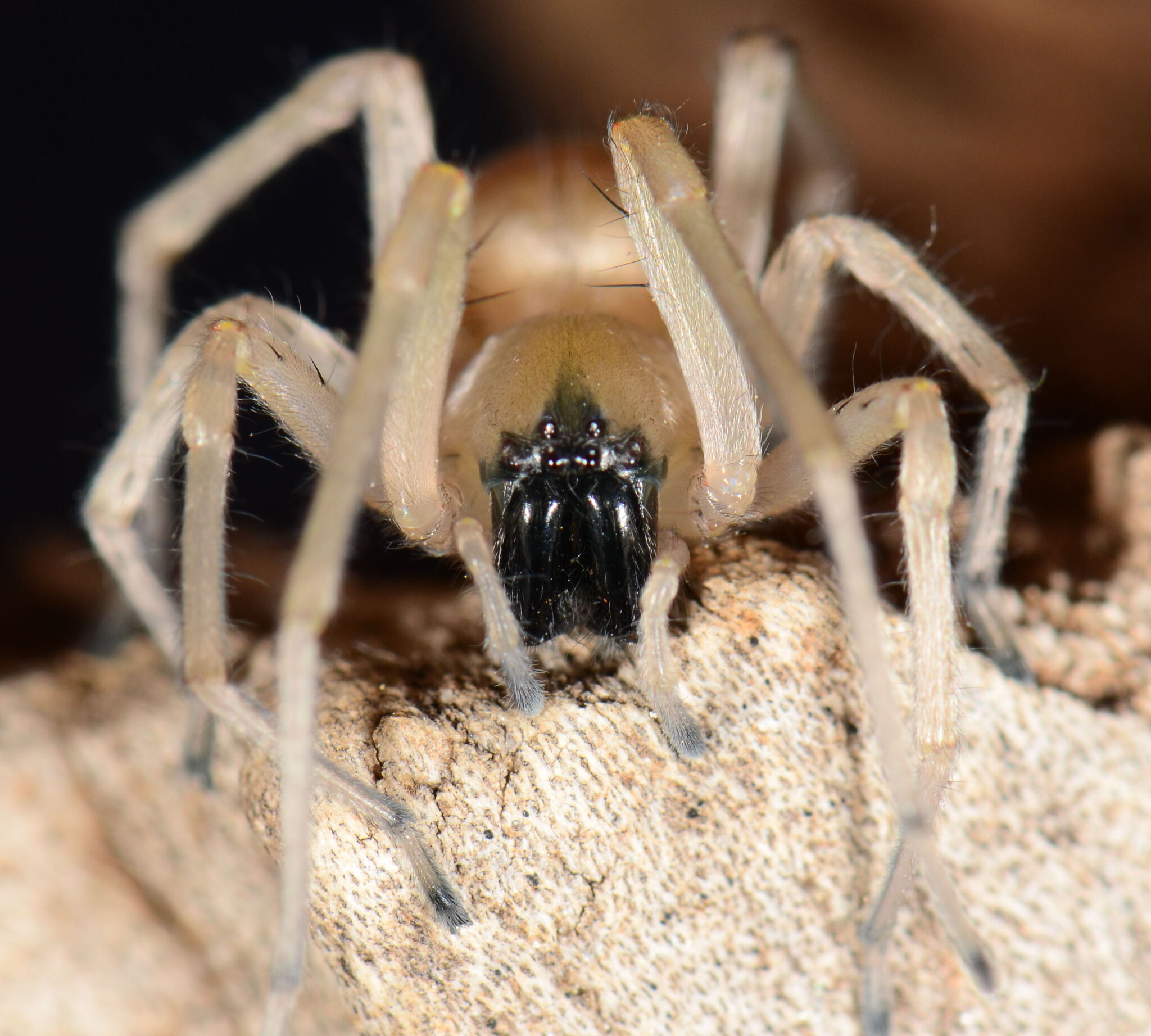
- Female

Scientific classification
- Kingdom: Animalia
- Phylum: Arthropoda
- Subphylum: Chelicerata
- Class: Arachnida
- Order: Araneae
- Infraorder: Araneomorphae
- Family: Cheiracanthiidae
- Genus: Cheiracanthium
- Species: C. furculatum

Binomial name
- Cheiracanthium furculatum Karsch, 1879

Synonyms
- Cheiracanthium abyssinicum Strand, 1906; Cheiracanthium castum Lawrence, 1927; Cheiracanthium geniculosum Simon, 1886; Cheiracanthium hoggi Lessert, 1921; Cheiracanthium kiwunum Strand, 1916; Cheiracanthium lawrencei Roewer, 1951; Cheiracanthium melanostomellum Roewer, 1951; Cheiracanthium mohasicum Strand, 1916

= Cheiracanthium furculatum =

Common House Sac Spider

Species of spider

Cheiracanthium furculatum is a species of spider in the family Cheiracanthiidae, commonly known as the Common House Sac Spider. It is an African endemic that has been introduced to Belgium.

== Distribution ==
C. furculatum is widely found throughout Africa, Madagascar and Comoro Islands. In South Africa, it occurs in all nine provinces in more than 10 protected areas, at elevations from 3-1752 m above sea level.

== Habitat ==
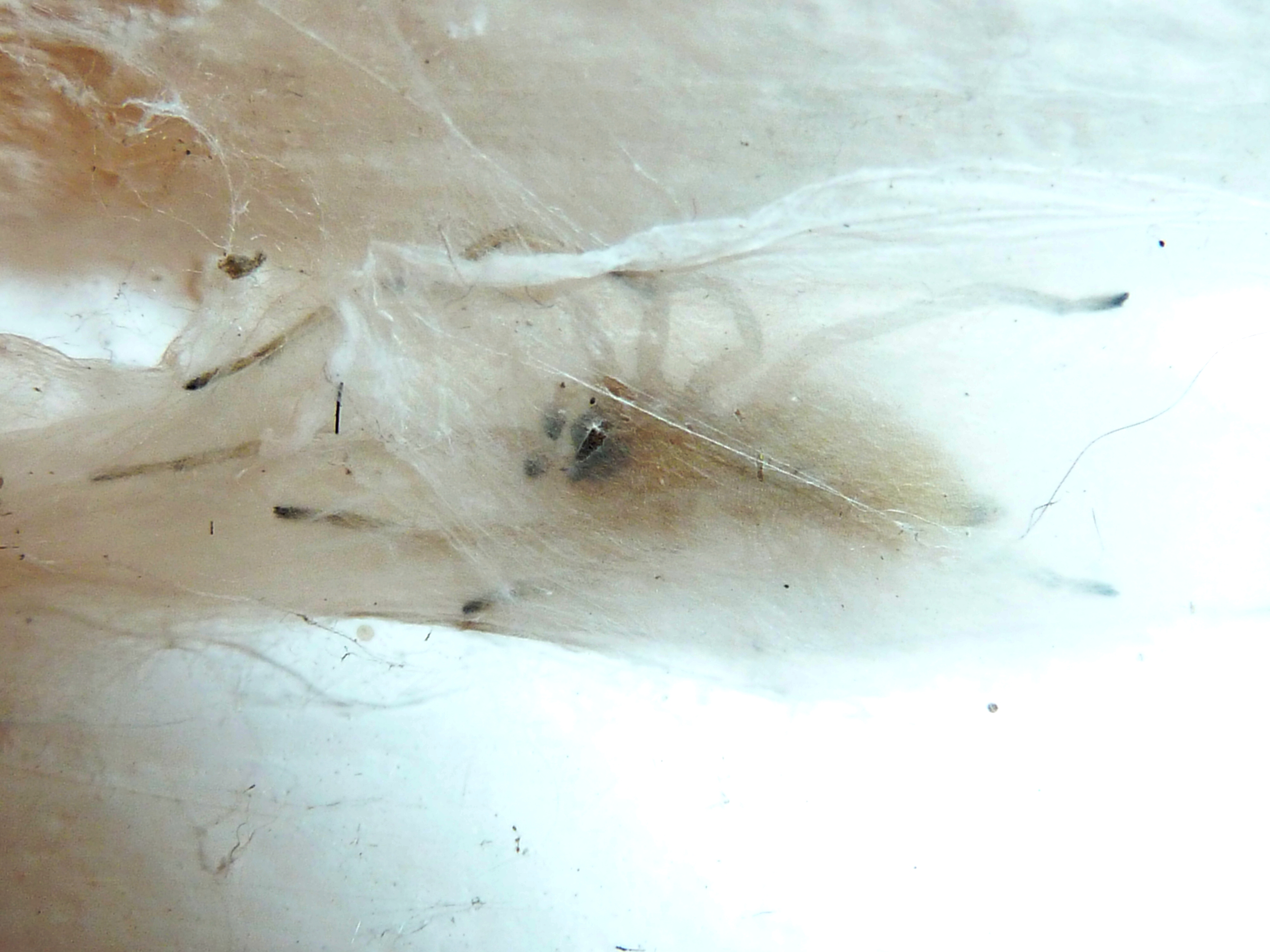
Long-legged sac spider Cheiracanthium furculatum in its silk sac retreat, Pretoria, South Africa. It would emerge after dark to hunt. Entering of houses associated with onset of summer.

This very common species has been sampled from all biomes except Succulent Karoo. It occurs in vegetation, houses, gardens, grasslands, cultivated crops, shrubs, and trees.

== Description ==
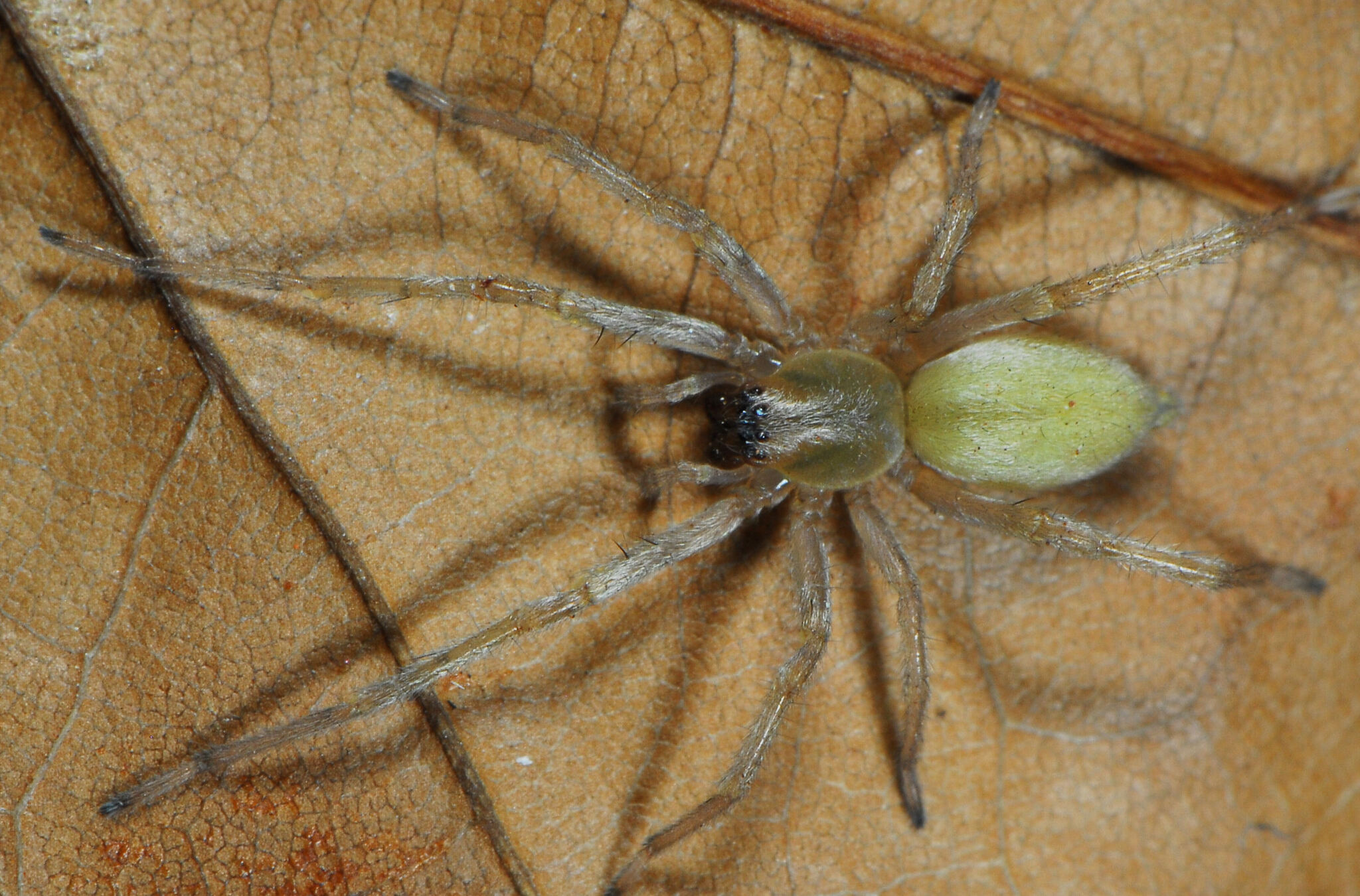
female

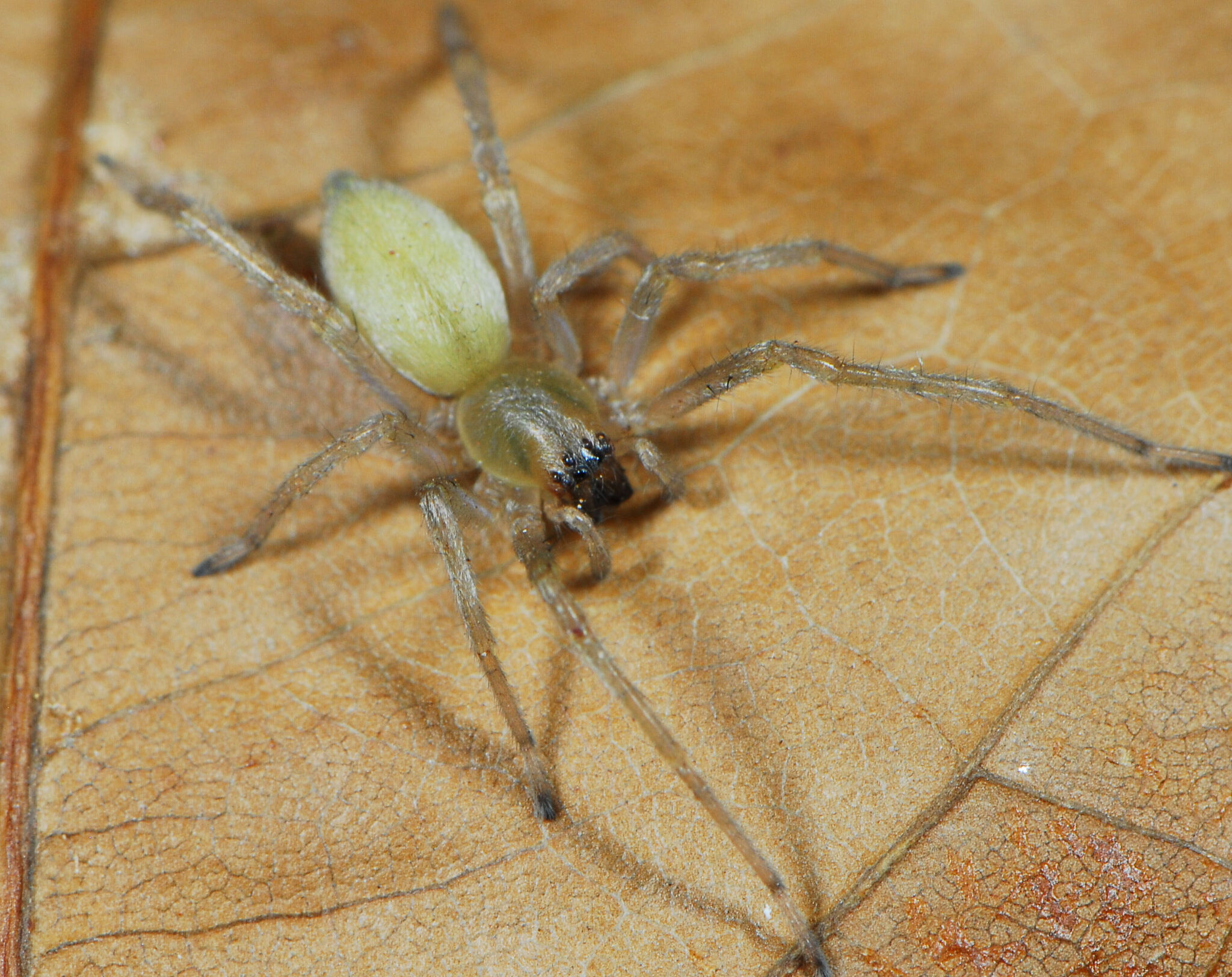
female

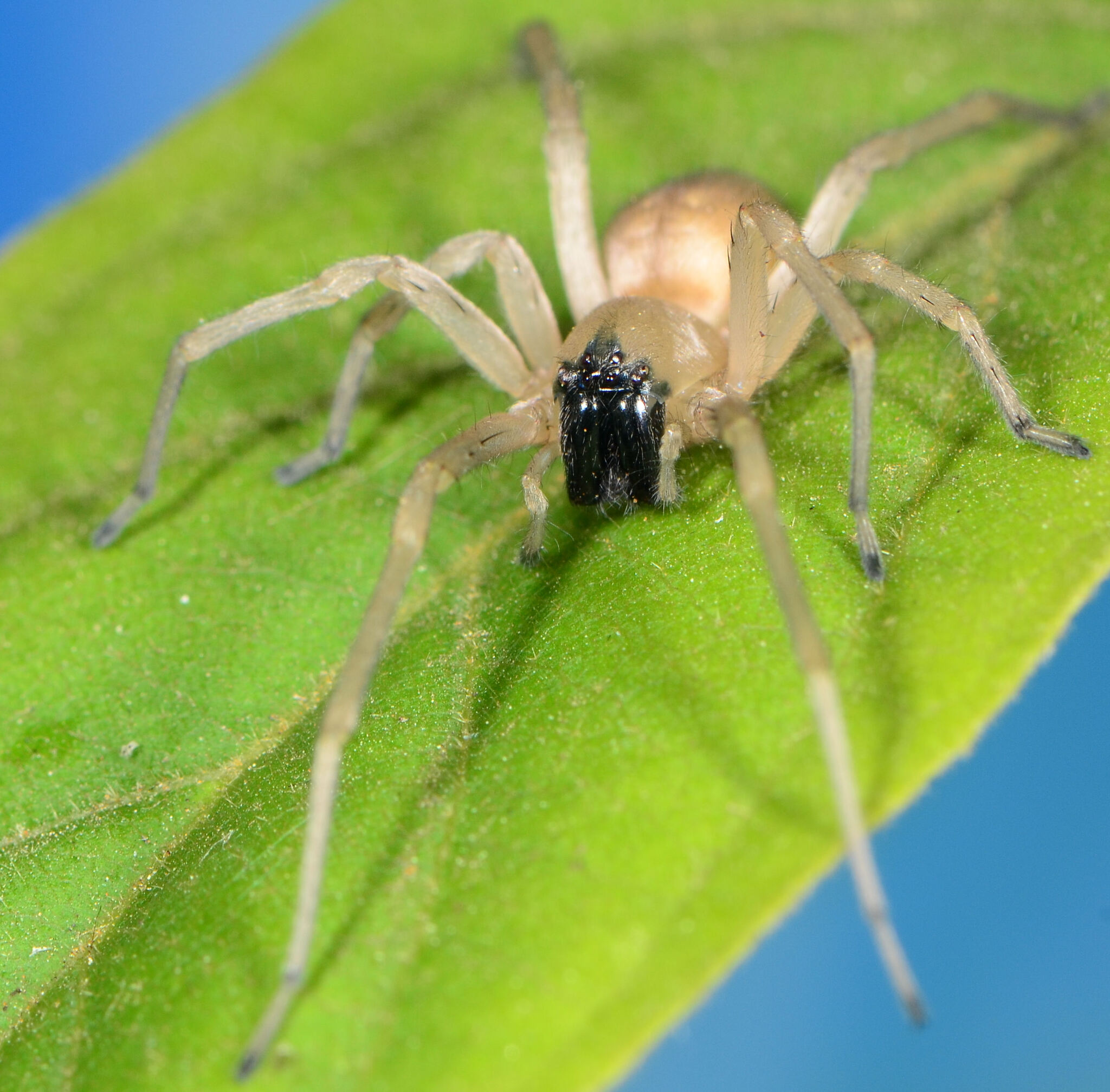
female

The species displays characteristic cream-yellow body coloration with blackish-brown chelicerae and eye region typical of Cheiracanthium. It constructs sac-like retreats in vegetation, particularly in rolled-up leaves.

== Ecology and behavior ==
C. furculatum is an aggressive predator that kills prey it encounters, though it may not always feed on them. Four types of retreats are constructed: resting, mating, breeding, and hibernating.

=== Agricultural importance ===
This species is highly significant in South African agriculture, recorded from avocado, citrus, cotton, lucerne, macadamia, maize, mango, pecans, pistachio, potatoes, strawberries, tomatoes, and vineyards. In citrus orchards, individuals can kill up to 29.3 citrus mites per spider per day.

=== Economic impact ===
While beneficial in vineyards, these spiders can become trapped in table grape containers during export. They can survive long periods at low temperatures and may escape when containers are opened in recipient countries.

== Medical significance ==
C. furculatum is frequently found in houses and can bite when threatened. It produces cytotoxic venom affecting tissue around bite sites, potentially causing lesions up to 10 cm in diameter. It is the most abundant spider species found in houses in Gauteng and Free State provinces.

== Conservation ==
Due to its wide geographical range, the species is listed as Least Concern. It has been sampled from more than 20 protected areas.
