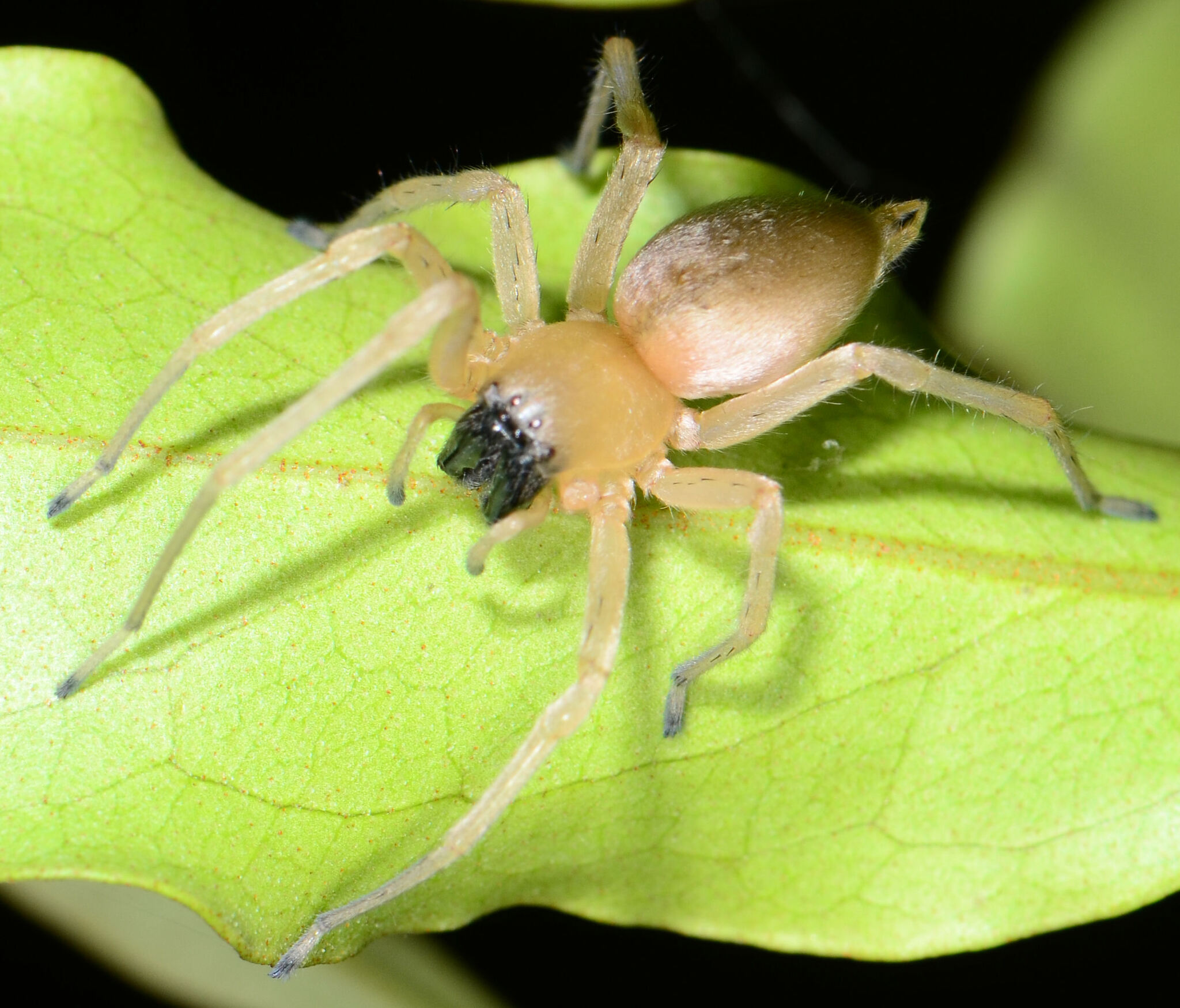
- Female
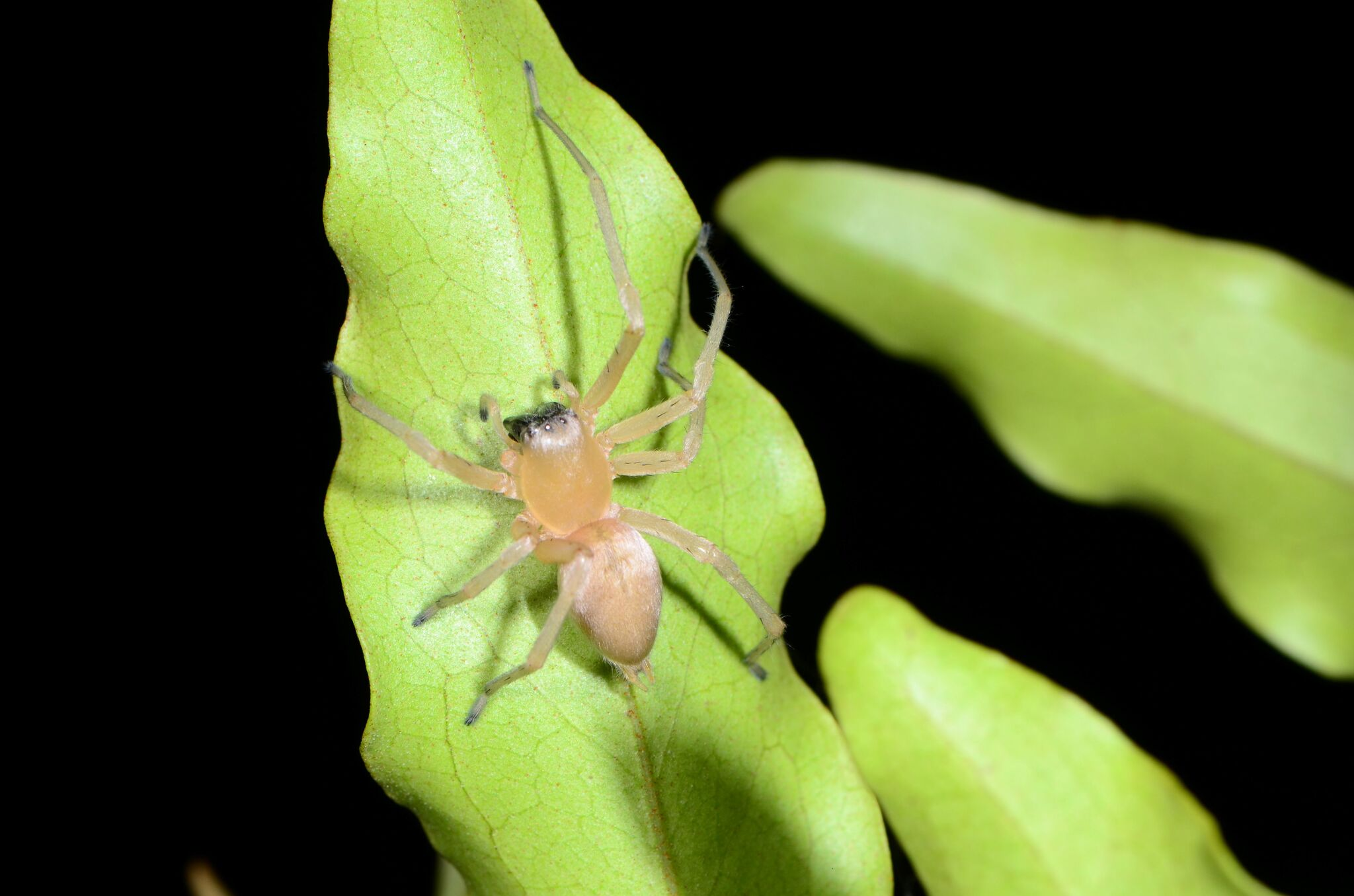
- Female

Scientific classification
- Kingdom: Animalia
- Phylum: Arthropoda
- Subphylum: Chelicerata
- Class: Arachnida
- Order: Araneae
- Infraorder: Araneomorphae
- Family: Cheiracanthiidae
- Genus: Cheiracanthium
- Species: C. vansoni

Binomial name
- Cheiracanthium vansoni Lawrence, 1936

= Cheiracanthium vansoni =

Vanson's Sac Spider

Species of spider

Cheiracanthium vansoni is a species of spider in the family Cheiracanthiidae. It was originally described from Botswana and is known from East and Southern Africa.

== Distribution ==
C. vansoni has been found in Tanzania, Zambia, Namibia, Botswana, Mozambique, Zimbabwe, South Africa.

In South Africa, the species is known from seven provinces at elevations from 7-1556 m above sea level.

== Habitat ==
This species is a free-living plant dweller that constructs silk retreats in rolled-up leaves. It has been sampled from the Forest, Grassland, Indian Ocean Coastal Belt, Nama Karoo and Savanna biomes. The species has also been found in cultivated crops such as cotton and pistachio orchards.

== Conservation ==
Due to its wide geographical range, it is listed as Least Concern. The species is protected in more than 10 protected areas.
