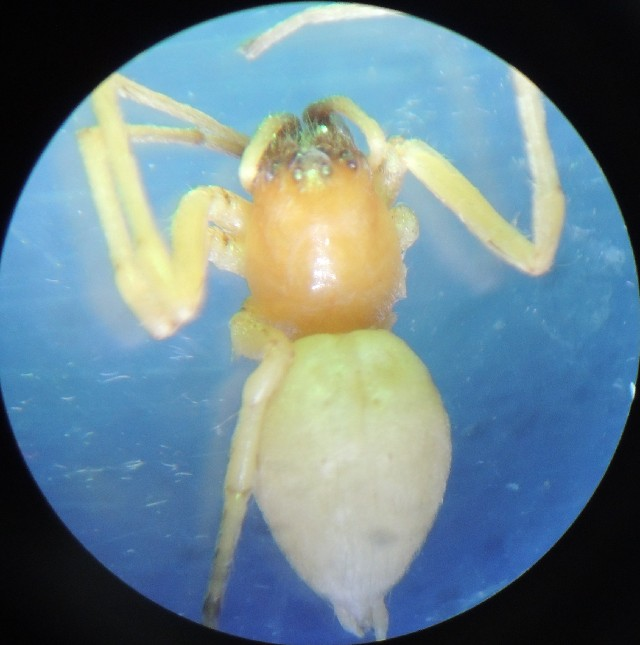

Scientific classification
- Kingdom: Animalia
- Phylum: Arthropoda
- Subphylum: Chelicerata
- Class: Arachnida
- Order: Araneae
- Infraorder: Araneomorphae
- Family: Cheiracanthiidae
- Genus: Cheiracanthium
- Species: C. insulanum

Binomial name
- Cheiracanthium insulanum Thorell, 1878

= Cheiracanthium insulanum =

Species of spider

Cheiracanthium insulanum, commonly known in Mandarin Chinese as 島嶼紅螯蛛 or Island red chelate spider, is a species of yellow sac spider found throughout Southeast Asia. It was first described by Tamerlan Thorell in 1878.

== Description ==
C. insulanum are pale yellow in color, with dark brown maxilla and dark brown palpal tarsi. They also have remarkably dark, drooping chelicerae, which helps distinguish them from similar species. Their abdomen is slender, with a pale grayish cardiac pattern on the back.

== Distribution ==
C. insulanum are found in China, Indonesia, Myanmar, the Philippines, Thailand, and Taiwan. In Taiwan, they can be found at low elevations between 200m and 800m.
