= Cheiracanthium salsicola =

Scientific classification
- Kingdom: Animalia
- Phylum: Arthropoda
- Subphylum: Chelicerata
- Class: Arachnida
- Order: Araneae
- Infraorder: Araneomorphae
- Family: Cheiracanthiidae
- Genus: Cheiracanthium
- Species: C. salsicola

Binomial name
- Cheiracanthium salsicola Simon, 1932

Species of spider

Cheiracanthium salsicola is a spider species found in France.
