= Cheiracanthium annulipes =

Scientific classification
- Kingdom: Animalia
- Phylum: Arthropoda
- Subphylum: Chelicerata
- Class: Arachnida
- Order: Araneae
- Infraorder: Araneomorphae
- Family: Cheiracanthiidae
- Genus: Cheiracanthium
- Species: C. annulipes

Binomial name
- Cheiracanthium annulipes O. P.-Cambridge, 1872

Species of spider

Cheiracanthium annulipes is a spider species found in the Canary Islands, Portugal, Spain, Algeria, Tunisia, Egypt, and Israel.
