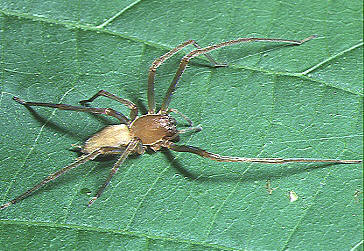

Scientific classification
- Kingdom: Animalia
- Phylum: Arthropoda
- Subphylum: Chelicerata
- Class: Arachnida
- Order: Araneae
- Infraorder: Araneomorphae
- Family: Cheiracanthiidae
- Genus: Cheiracanthium
- Species: C. eutittha

Binomial name
- Cheiracanthium eutittha Bösenberg et Strand, 1906

= Cheiracanthium eutittha =

Species of spider

Cheiracanthium eutittha, commonly known in Mandarin Chinese as “長腿紅螯蛛" or Long-legged red chelate spider, is a species of yellow sac spider found in Japan, Korea, and Taiwan. It was first described by German arachnologist, Friedrich Wilhelm Bösenberg, in 1906.

== Description ==
C. eutittha are yellowish brown in color, with a long, slender body and a pale grayish cardiac pattern dorsally. They lack a thoracic furrow. They are distinguished from similar species by a dark dumb-bell-shaped marking on, and uncoiled ascending and descending portions of the copulatory duct of the epigynum of females, and by the short tibial apophysis and the robust cymbial spur on the pedipalps of males.

== Distribution ==
In Taiwan, C. eutittha are widely distributed in the low mountain area between 200 m (660 ft) and 600 m (2,000 ft) in elevation.
