= Cheiracanthium torsivum =

Scientific classification
- Kingdom: Animalia
- Phylum: Arthropoda
- Subphylum: Chelicerata
- Class: Arachnida
- Order: Araneae
- Infraorder: Araneomorphae
- Family: Cheiracanthiidae
- Genus: Cheiracanthium
- Species: C. torsivum

Binomial name
- Cheiracanthium torsivum Chen et Huang, 2012

Species of spider

Cheiracanthium torsivum, commonly known in Mandarin Chinese as "旋距紅螯蛛" or Twisted spur red chelate spider, is a species of yellow sac spider endemic to Taiwan.

== Description ==
C. torsivum have a yellowish-brown carapace and yellow abdomen. Their abdomen has a pale grayish brown cardiac pattern. They are distinguished from similar species by the shape of the male's pedipalps; the palpal bulb sports a spiniform apophysis and distally-intorted cymbial spur. Females are distinguished from those of other species by dark, globular markings that can be seen through the tegument of the epigynum.

== Distribution ==
C. torsivum is found in northern and southeastern Taiwan at elevations between 500m and 1800m.

== Etymology ==
"Torsivum," from the species name Cheiracanthium torsivum, means "spiral-twisted" and refers to the spiriform cymbial spur on the male's pedipalp.
