= Cheiracanthium fulvotestaceum =

Scientific classification
- Kingdom: Animalia
- Phylum: Arthropoda
- Subphylum: Chelicerata
- Class: Arachnida
- Order: Araneae
- Infraorder: Araneomorphae
- Family: Cheiracanthiidae
- Genus: Cheiracanthium
- Species: C. fulvotestaceum

Binomial name
- Cheiracanthium fulvotestaceum Simon, 1878

Species of spider

Cheiracanthium fulvotestaceum is a spider species found in France. It was first described by Eugène Simon in 1878.
