= Homonotus sanguinolentus =

Scientific classification
- Domain: Eukaryota
- Kingdom: Animalia
- Phylum: Arthropoda
- Class: Insecta
- Order: Hymenoptera
- Family: Pompilidae
- Genus: Homonotus
- Species: H. sanguinolentus

Binomial name
- Homonotus sanguinolentus (Fabricius, 1793)

Synonyms
- Sphex sanguinolentus Fabricius, 1793; Ferreola nigra Marquet, 1879; Pompilus dispar Latreille, 1809; Homonotus nasutus Morawitz, 1888; Anoplius bidens Lepeletier, 1845; Pompilus affinis Eversmann, 1849; Pompilus doctor Dalla Torre, 1897

Species of wasp

Homonotus sanguinolentus, the bloody spider-hunting wasp is a European species of Pompilid wasp.

== Biology ==
Homonotus sanguinolentus preys on one species of spider, Cheiracanthium erraticum, which lives on the damper patches of heathlands. From late June until August the female spider spins a purse-like web using vegetation such as heather inflorescences and grass flowering stems. She remains this web until her eggs are laid and the young hatched. A hunting female H. sanguinolentus will force entry into the spider's purse-web and if it discovers a gravid female spider, the wasp quickly paralyses the spider by stinging it. H. sanguinolentus lays its own egg on the front of the spider's abdomen and the spider recovers from the paralysis but it never leaves the web again, nor does she lay eggs. After three days the egg of H. sanguinolentus hatches and the larva feeds on the spider, finally killing it after about ten days. The H. sanguinolentus larva then spins its cocoon within the spider's purse-web. The purse-web has to remain intact and above the ground until the following July when the new adult H. sanguinolentus emerge.

== Habitat ==
Heathlands but with an open canopy of heathers with taller vegetation.

== Distribution ==
Southern and central Europe, north to southern England, Germany and Poland. In the north of its range this is a highly thermophilic species. In the United Kingdom it is a Biodiversity Action Plan species.
