= Cheiracanthium insigne =

Scientific classification
- Kingdom: Animalia
- Phylum: Arthropoda
- Subphylum: Chelicerata
- Class: Arachnida
- Order: Araneae
- Infraorder: Araneomorphae
- Family: Cheiracanthiidae
- Genus: Cheiracanthium
- Species: C. insigne

Binomial name
- Cheiracanthium insigne O. Pickard-Cambridge, 1874

Species of spider

Cheiracanthium insigne, is a species of spider of the genus Cheiracanthium. It is found in India, Sri Lanka, Thailand, Myanmar, Laos, China. The species is sometimes classified as a senior synonym of Eutittha gracilipes.
