= Cheiracanthium angolense =

Angola Sac Spider

Conservation status
- Least Concern (SANBI Red List)

Scientific classification
- Kingdom: Animalia
- Phylum: Arthropoda
- Subphylum: Chelicerata
- Class: Arachnida
- Order: Araneae
- Infraorder: Araneomorphae
- Family: Cheiracanthiidae
- Genus: Cheiracanthium
- Species: C. angolense

Binomial name
- Cheiracanthium angolense Lotz, 2007

Species of spider

Cheiracanthium angolense is a species of spider in the family Cheiracanthiidae. It is a southern African endemic originally described from Angola and is known from three southern African countries.

== Distribution ==
In South Africa, the species is recorded from two provinces at elevations from 677-1146 m above sea level.

== Habitat ==
This species is a free-living plant dweller that constructs silk retreats in rolled-up leaves. Specimens were collected by sweeping mixed grass in the Savanna Biome.

== Conservation ==
Due to its wide geographical range, it is listed as Least Concern. The species is protected in Blouberg Nature Reserve.
