= Cheiracanthium insulare =

Scientific classification
- Domain: Eukaryota
- Kingdom: Animalia
- Phylum: Arthropoda
- Subphylum: Chelicerata
- Class: Arachnida
- Order: Araneae
- Infraorder: Araneomorphae
- Family: Cheiracanthiidae
- Genus: Cheiracanthium
- Species: C. insulare

Binomial name
- Cheiracanthium insulare (Vinson, 1863)

Species of spider

Cheiracanthium insulare is a spider species found in Madagascar and Réunion.

== See also ==
- List of spiders of Madagascar
