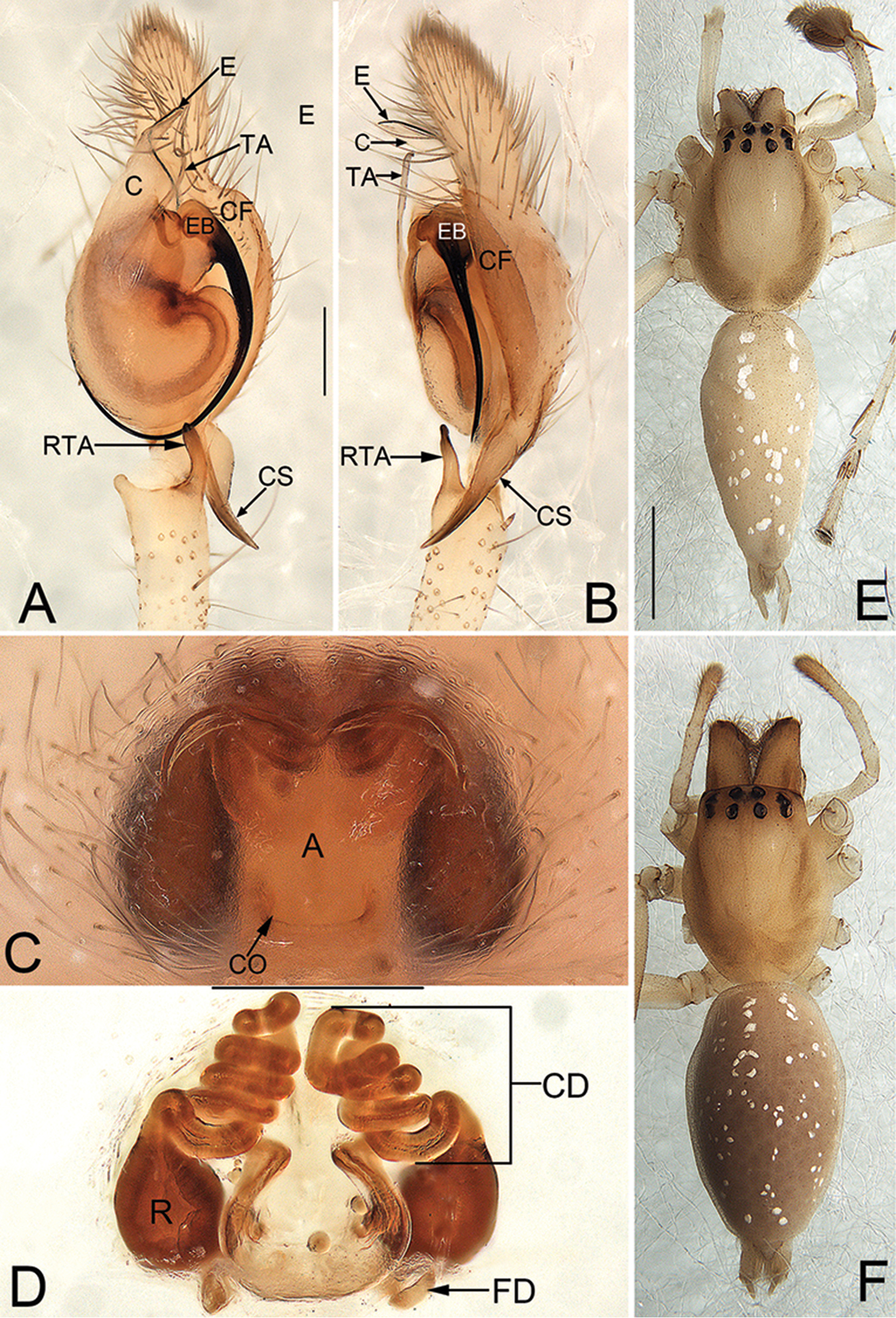

Scientific classification
- Kingdom: Animalia
- Phylum: Arthropoda
- Subphylum: Chelicerata
- Class: Arachnida
- Order: Araneae
- Infraorder: Araneomorphae
- Family: Cheiracanthiidae
- Genus: Cheiracanthium
- Species: C. taiwanicum

Binomial name
- Cheiracanthium taiwanicum Chen, Huang, Chen et Wang, 2006

= Cheiracanthium taiwanicum =

Species of spider

Cheiracanthium taiwanicum, commonly known in Mandarin Chinese as "台灣紅螯蛛" or Taiwan red chelate spider, is a species of yellow sac spider endemic to Taiwan. The species was discovered in 2006.

== Description ==
C. taiwanicum are pale yellow in color, with broad greenish-brown stripes down their cephalothorax. Their abdomens are slender and marked with white freckles.

== Distribution ==
C. taiwanicum are widely distributed in Taiwan at elevations between 50m and 1200m.
