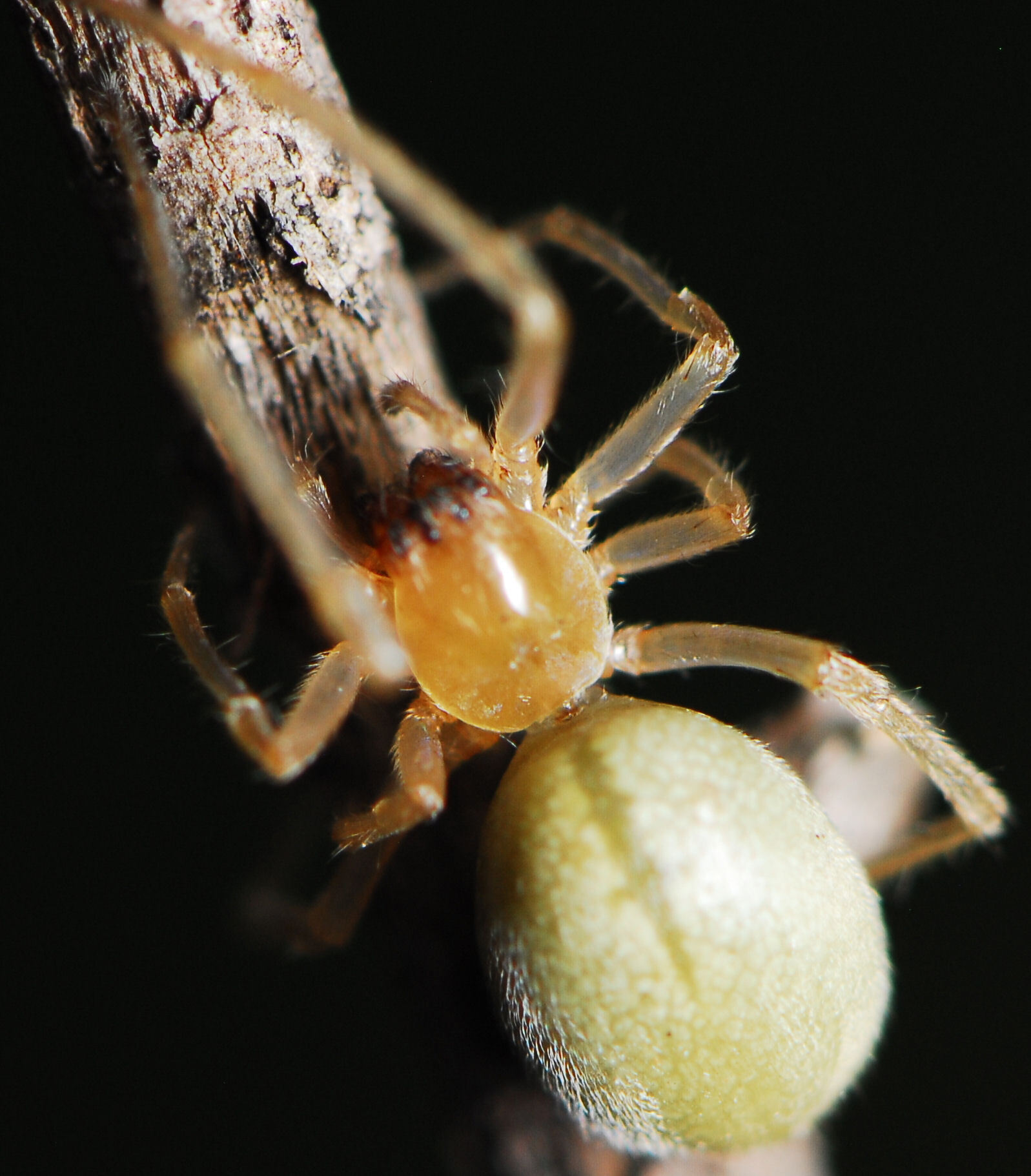
- female
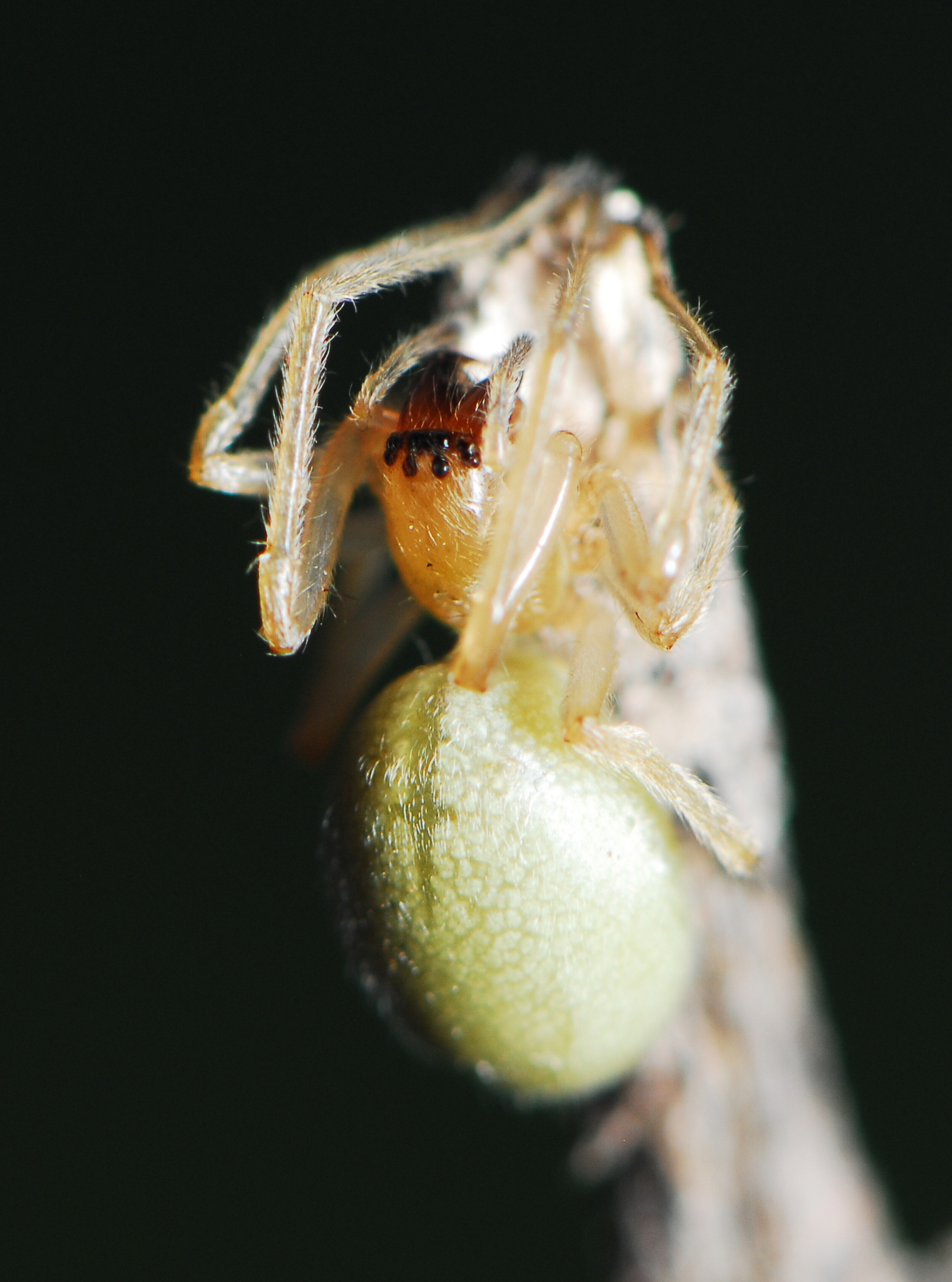
- female

Scientific classification
- Kingdom: Animalia
- Phylum: Arthropoda
- Subphylum: Chelicerata
- Class: Arachnida
- Order: Araneae
- Infraorder: Araneomorphae
- Family: Cheiracanthiidae
- Genus: Cheiracanthium
- Species: C. africanum

Binomial name
- Cheiracanthium africanum Lessert, 1921

Synonyms
- Cheiracanthium franganilloi Caporiacco, 1949; Cheiracanthium tenuipes Roewer, 1961; Cheiracanthium nigropalpatum Schmidt & Jocqué, 1983

= Cheiracanthium africanum =

African Sac Spider

Species of spider

Cheiracanthium africanum is a species of spider in the family Cheiracanthiidae. It is an African endemic originally described from Tanzania and is recorded from 16 African countries.

== Distribution ==
In South Africa, the species is known from all nine provinces at elevations from 20-2398 m above sea level.

== Habitat ==
This species is a free-living plant dweller that constructs silk retreats in rolled-up leaves. It has been collected from a wide variety of habitats including gardens, grasslands, cultivated crops, shrubs, trees and from under stones. The species has been sampled from all floral biomes except Desert and Succulent Karoo.

== Conservation ==
Due to its wide geographical range, it is listed as Least Concern. It has been sampled from more than 20 protected areas.
