= Cheiracanthium indicum =

Scientific classification
- Kingdom: Animalia
- Phylum: Arthropoda
- Subphylum: Chelicerata
- Class: Arachnida
- Order: Araneae
- Infraorder: Araneomorphae
- Family: Cheiracanthiidae
- Genus: Cheiracanthium
- Species: C. indicum

Binomial name
- Cheiracanthium indicum O. Pickard-Cambridge, 1874

Species of spider

Cheiracanthium indicum, is a species of spider of the genus Cheiracanthium. It is native to India and Sri Lanka.
