= Cheiracanthium minshullae =

Minshull's Sac Spider

Scientific classification
- Kingdom: Animalia
- Phylum: Arthropoda
- Subphylum: Chelicerata
- Class: Arachnida
- Order: Araneae
- Infraorder: Araneomorphae
- Family: Cheiracanthiidae
- Genus: Cheiracanthium
- Species: C. minshullae

Binomial name
- Cheiracanthium minshullae Lotz, 2007

Species of spider

Cheiracanthium minshullae is a species of spider in the family Cheiracanthiidae. It is a southern African endemic described from Zimbabwe and known from three southern African countries.

== Distribution ==
In South Africa, the species is recorded from KwaZulu-Natal at elevations from 5-140 m above sea level.

== Habitat ==
This species is a free-living plant dweller that constructs silk retreats in rolled-up leaves. Some specimens were collected with malaise traps and by beating trees. It has been sampled from the Savanna Biome.

== Conservation ==
Due to its wide geographical range, it is listed as Least Concern. The species is protected in Ndumo Game Reserve and iSimangaliso Wetland Park.
