= Cheiracanthium dippenaarae =

Dippenaar's Sac Spider

Conservation status
- Least Concern (IUCN 3.1)

Scientific classification
- Kingdom: Animalia
- Phylum: Arthropoda
- Subphylum: Chelicerata
- Class: Arachnida
- Order: Araneae
- Infraorder: Araneomorphae
- Family: Cheiracanthiidae
- Genus: Cheiracanthium
- Species: C. dippenaarae

Binomial name
- Cheiracanthium dippenaarae Lotz, 2007

Species of spider

Dippenaar's sac spider (Cheiracanthium dippenaarae) is a species of spider in the family Cheiracanthiidae. It is a South African endemic described from Roodeplaatdam Nature Reserve.

== Distribution ==
The species is presently known from two provinces at elevations from 913-1247 m above sea level.

== Habitat ==
This species is a free-living plant dweller that constructs silk retreats in rolled-up leaves. It has been sampled from the Savanna Biome by sweeping grass and has also been found in cotton fields.

== Conservation ==
Despite its restricted range, the species can survive in agroecosystems. It is listed as Data Deficient because more sampling is needed to collect males and determine its full range. The species is protected in Roodeplaatdam Nature Reserve and Tswaing Crater Nature Reserve.
