= Cheiracanthium falcatum =

Scientific classification
- Kingdom: Animalia
- Phylum: Arthropoda
- Subphylum: Chelicerata
- Class: Arachnida
- Order: Araneae
- Infraorder: Araneomorphae
- Family: Cheiracanthiidae
- Genus: Cheiracanthium
- Species: C. falcatum

Binomial name
- Cheiracanthium falcatum Chen, Huang, Chen et Wang, 2006

Species of spider

Cheiracanthium falcatum, commonly known in Mandarin Chinese as "長腿紅螯蛛" or Sickle-shaped red chelate spider, is a species of yellow sac spider endemic to Taiwan.

== Description ==
C. falcatum are yellowish brown in color, with a long, slender body and brown maxilla and chelicerae. They lack a thoracic furrow. They are distinguished from similar species by a posterior epigyneal depression, copulatory duct coils in three spirals leading downward to the spermatheca in the female vulva, and a finger-like tibial apophysis and long sickle-shaped cymbial spur in the pedipalps of males. They most resemble C. ningmingense but may be distinguished by their thicker tibial apophysis in the male palpus.

== Distribution ==
C. falcatum are endemic to Taiwan and widely distributed at elevations between 200m and 800m.
