= Cheiracanthium margaritae =

Scientific classification
- Kingdom: Animalia
- Phylum: Arthropoda
- Subphylum: Chelicerata
- Class: Arachnida
- Order: Araneae
- Infraorder: Araneomorphae
- Family: Cheiracanthiidae
- Genus: Cheiracanthium
- Species: C. margaritae

Binomial name
- Cheiracanthium margaritae Sterghiu, 1985

Species of spider

Cheiracanthium margaritae is a spider species found in Romania.
