= Cheiracanthium effossum =

Scientific classification
- Kingdom: Animalia
- Phylum: Arthropoda
- Subphylum: Chelicerata
- Class: Arachnida
- Order: Araneae
- Infraorder: Araneomorphae
- Family: Cheiracanthiidae
- Genus: Cheiracanthium
- Species: C. effossum

Binomial name
- Cheiracanthium effossum Herman, 1879

Species of spider

Cheiracanthium effossum is a spider species found in Central Europe to Eastern Europe.
