= Cheiracanthium elegans =

Scientific classification
- Kingdom: Animalia
- Phylum: Arthropoda
- Subphylum: Chelicerata
- Class: Arachnida
- Order: Araneae
- Infraorder: Araneomorphae
- Family: Cheiracanthiidae
- Genus: Cheiracanthium
- Species: C. elegans

Binomial name
- Cheiracanthium elegans Thorell, 1875

Species of spider

Cheiracanthium elegans is a species of spider in the genus Cheiracanthium found in Europe and Central Asia.
