= Cheiracanthium occidentale =

Scientific classification
- Kingdom: Animalia
- Phylum: Arthropoda
- Subphylum: Chelicerata
- Class: Arachnida
- Order: Araneae
- Infraorder: Araneomorphae
- Family: Cheiracanthiidae
- Genus: Cheiracanthium
- Species: C. occidentale

Binomial name
- Cheiracanthium occidentale L. Koch, 1882

Species of spider

Cheiracanthium occidentale is a spider species found in Italy and the Balearic Islands.
