= Cheiracanthium foordi =

Scientific classification
- Kingdom: Animalia
- Phylum: Arthropoda
- Subphylum: Chelicerata
- Class: Arachnida
- Order: Araneae
- Infraorder: Araneomorphae
- Family: Cheiracanthiidae
- Genus: Cheiracanthium
- Species: C. foordi

Binomial name
- Cheiracanthium foordi Lotz, 2015

Species of spider

Cheiracanthium foordi is a species of spider in the family Cheiracanthiidae. It is a Limpopo endemic described from Marakele National Park.

== Etymology ==
The species is named after South African arachnologist Stefan Hendrik Foord.

== Distribution ==
The species is found at approximately 1200 m above sea level.

== Habitat ==
This species is a free-living plant dweller that was sampled from open woodland in the Savanna Biome.

== Conservation ==
The species is listed as Data Deficient because more sampling is needed to collect males and determine its full range. It is protected in Marakele National Park.
