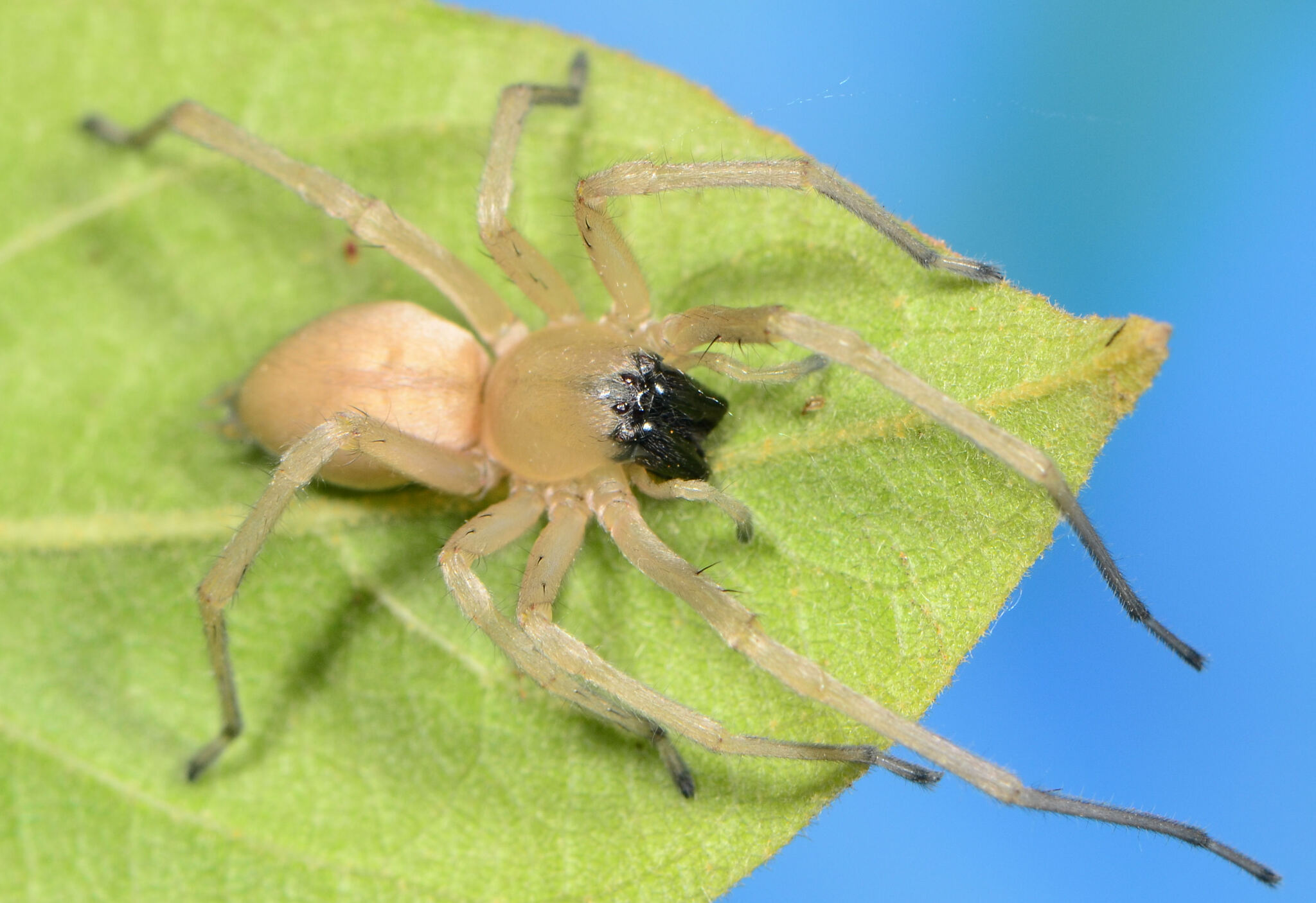
- Female C. furculatum
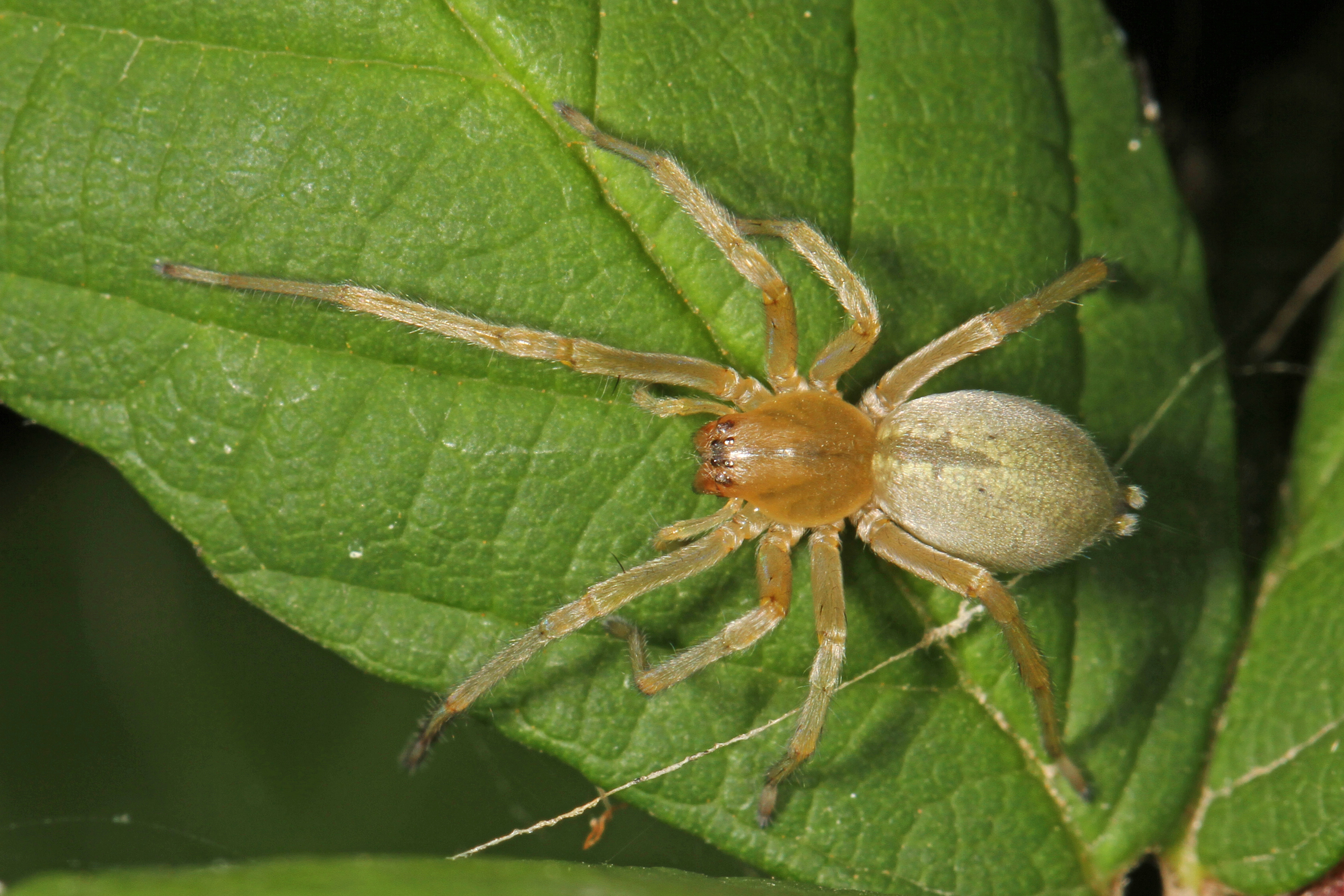
- Cheiracanthium sp., Pateros, Washington

Scientific classification
- Kingdom: Animalia
- Phylum: Arthropoda
- Subphylum: Chelicerata
- Class: Arachnida
- Order: Araneae
- Infraorder: Araneomorphae
- Family: Cheiracanthiidae
- Genus: Cheiracanthium; C. L. Koch, 1839

Type species
- C. punctorium (Villers, 1789)

Species
- 212, see text

Synonyms
- Chiracanthops Mello-Leitão, 1942; Helebiona Benoit, 1977

= Cheiracanthium =

Yellow sac spider

Genus of spiders

Cheiracanthium, commonly called yellow sac spiders or long-legged sac spiders, is a genus of araneomorph spiders in the family Cheiracanthiidae, and was first described by Carl Ludwig Koch in 1839.

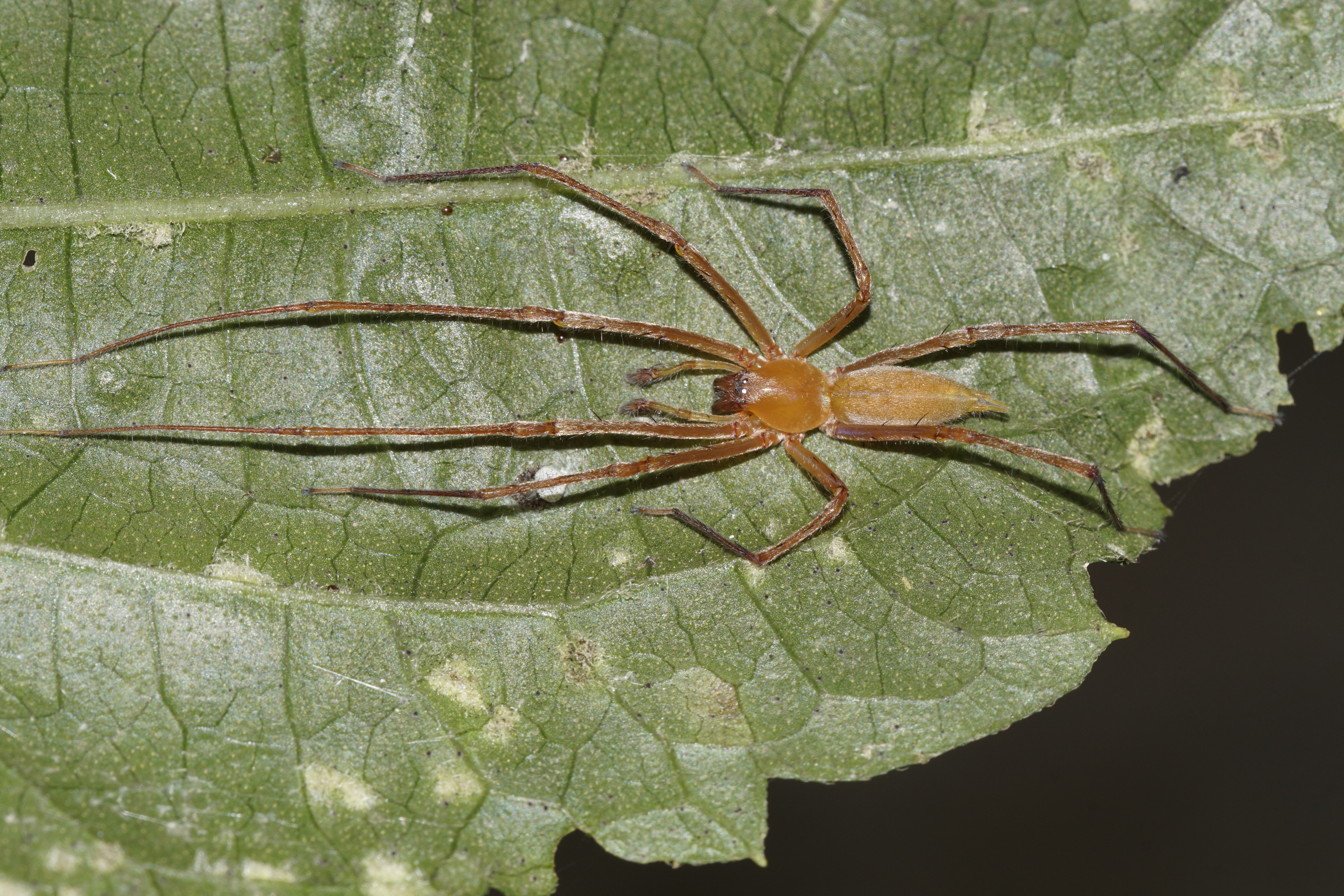
C. danieli

== Distribution ==
Cheiracanthium is primarily an Old World genus, with many species found from northern Europe to Japan, from Southern Africa to India and Australia. The only known species in the New World are C. inclusum and C. mildei. While the former also occurs in Africa and Réunion, the latter is found in the Holarctic region and Argentina. They can also be found in the lower mainland of British Columbia, Canada.

The genus is quite diverse in Africa and at least three or four species are known to occur in Egyptian cotton fields alone.

== Description ==
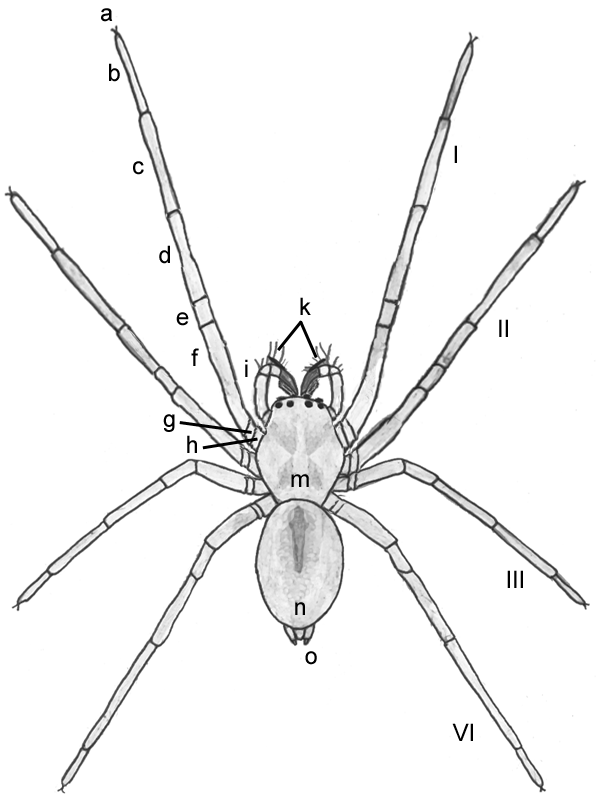
Schematic male of Cheiracanthium a) claws b) tarsus c) metatarsus d) tibia e) patella f) femur g) trochanter h) coxa i) pedipalp k) setae m) prosoma (cephalothorax) n) opisthosoma (abdomen) o) spinnerets

The eye arrangement of spiders in the genus Cheiracanthium

They are usually pale in colour, and have an abdomen that can range from yellow to beige. Both sexes range in size from 5 to 10 millimetres (0.20 to 0.39 in).

They are unique among common house spiders because their tarsi do not point either outward, like members of Tegenaria, or inward, like members of Araneus, making them easier to identify.

These spiders can be distinguished from the closely related Clubiona by the absence of an apparently visible dorsal groove along their carapace, as well as having front legs that are longer than the rest of their legs.

== Misconceptions ==
A theory that these spiders were attracted to the smell of gasoline was involved in a series of consumer vehicle callbacks in which spiderwebs had blocked fuel lines, but it has since been disproven by a study which found that the juvenile yellow sac spiders were attracted to the hose material itself.

== Venom ==
Though they are beneficial predators in agricultural fields, they are also known to be mildly venomous to humans. Painful bites may be incurred from species such as C. punctorium in Europe, C. mildei in Europe and North America, C. inclusum in the Americas, C. lawrencei in South Africa and C. japonicum in Japan. Cheiracanthium venom is purportedly necrotic, and can cause pain, swelling, and lesions in humans, but the necrotic nature and severity of its bite has been disputed. A study of twenty confirmed Cheiracanthium bites in the United States and Australia found that none resulted in necrosis, and a review of the international literature on 39 verified Cheiracanthium bites found only one case of mild necrosis in the European species C. punctorium.

== Species ==
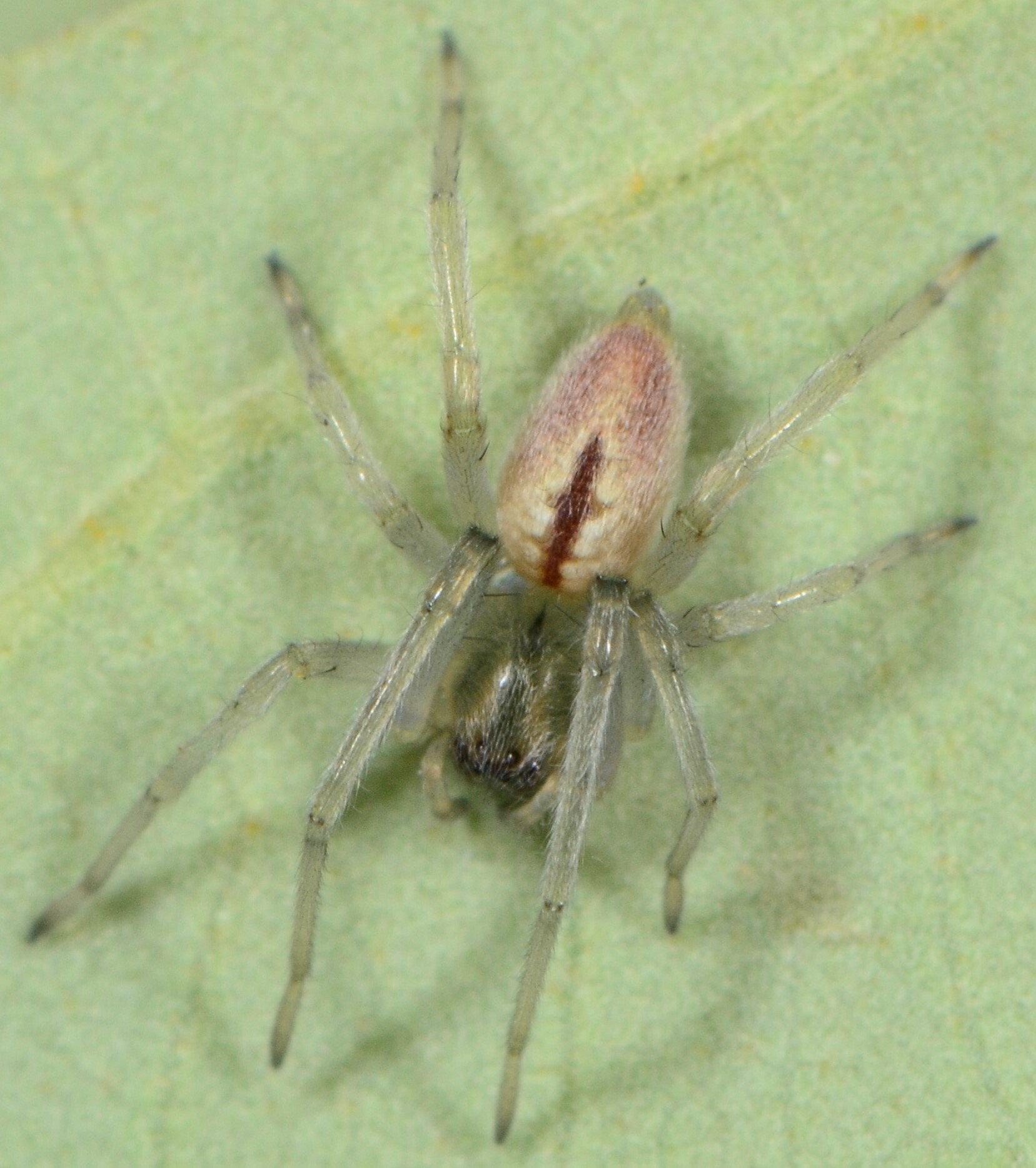
female C. aculeatum

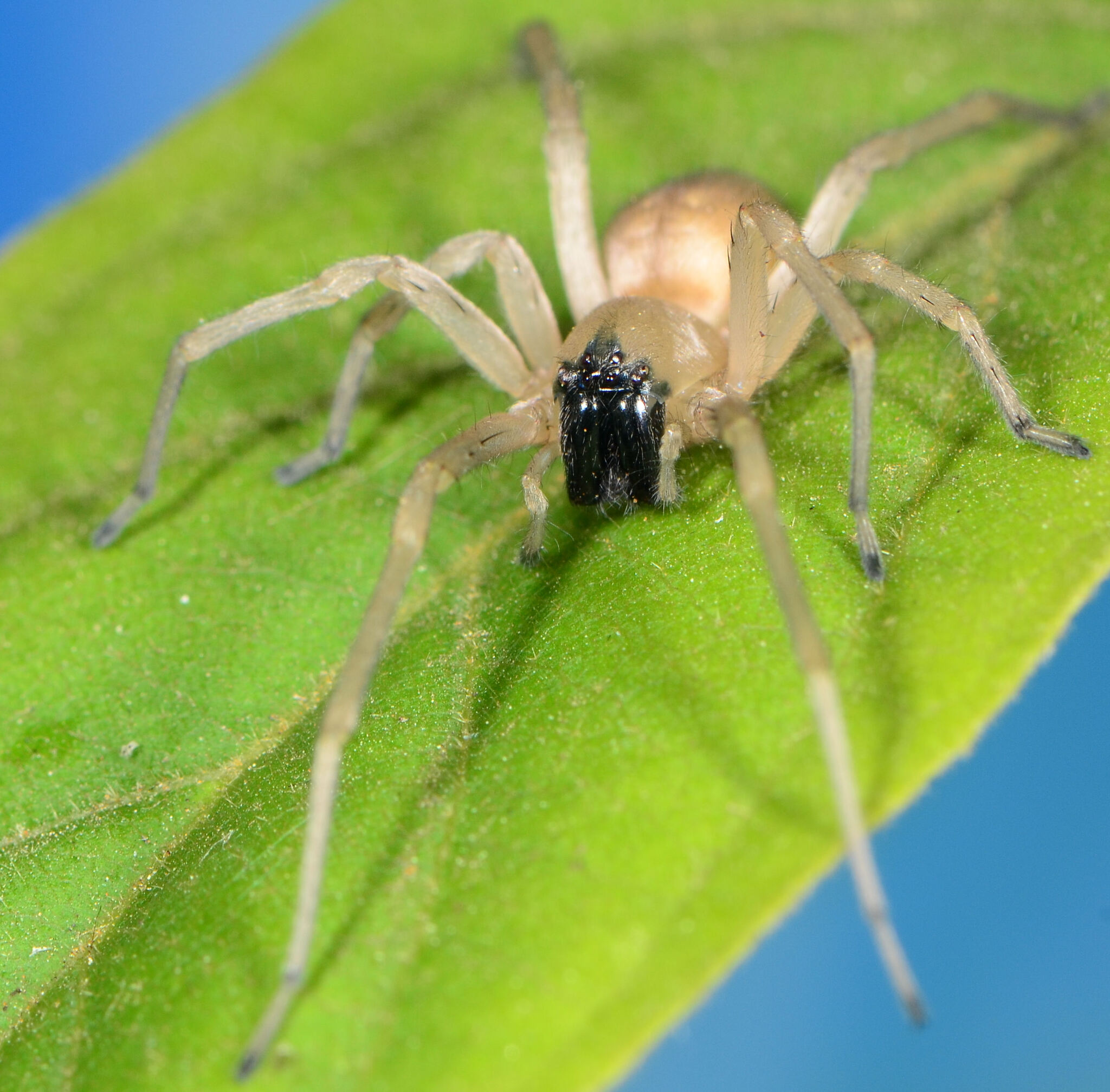
C. inclusum

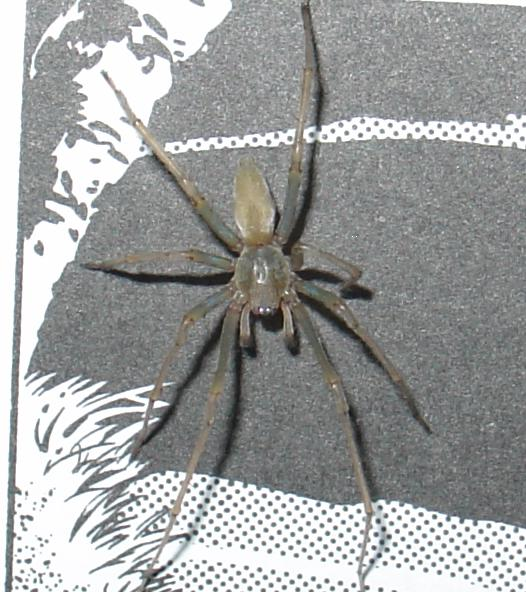
C. inclusum

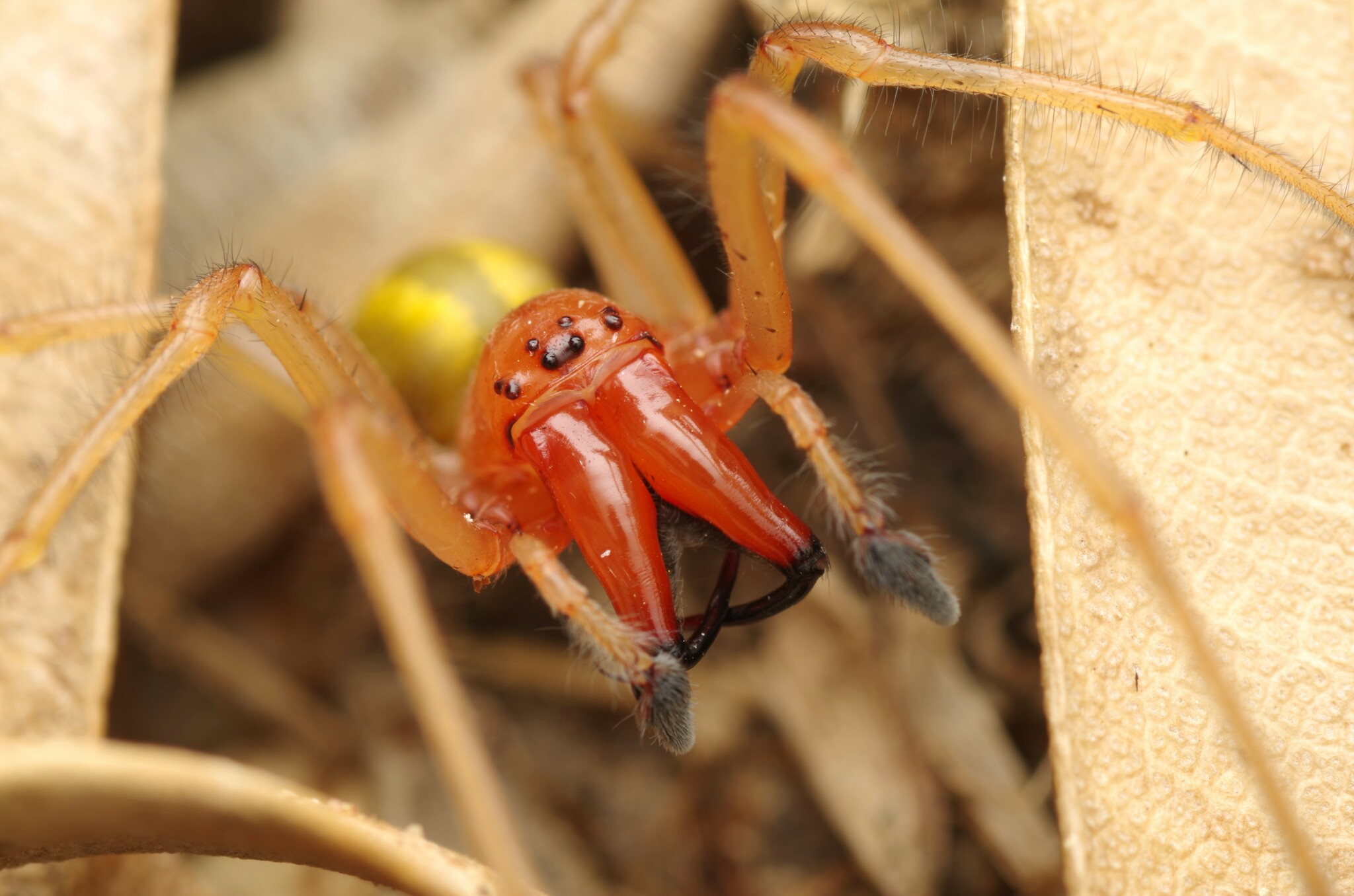
C. punctorium

As of October 2025, the World Spider Catalog accepts 231 species, found in the Caribbean, South America, Oceania, Europe, Central America, Africa, Asia, North America, and on Saint Helena:

These are species with articles on Wikipedia:

- Cheiracanthium abbreviatum Simon, 1878 – France, Denmark
- Cheiracanthium aculeatum Simon, 1884 – Ivory Coast, Sudan, Somalia, Zambia, Namibia, Zimbabwe, South Africa
- Cheiracanthium africanum Lessert, 1921 – Africa, Madagascar, Réunion
- Cheiracanthium angolense Lotz, 2007 – Angola, Zimbabwe, South Africa
- Cheiracanthium angulitarse Simon, 1878 – Spain, France (Corsica), Italy, Malta, Hungary, Romania
- Cheiracanthium annulipes O. Pickard-Cambridge, 1872 – Canary Islands, Portugal, Spain, Tunisia, Egypt, Israel
- Cheiracanthium antungense Chen & Huang, 2012 – Taiwan
- Cheiracanthium campestre Lohmander, 1944 – Sweden, Denmark, Central Europe, Italy, Romania, Ukraine, Russia (Europe)
- Cheiracanthium dippenaarae Lotz, 2007 – South Africa
- Cheiracanthium effossum Herman, 1879 – Central to eastern Europe
- Cheiracanthium elegans Thorell, 1875 – Europe, Turkey, Caucasus, Russia (Europe to South Siberia), Kazakhstan, Iran, Central Asia
- Cheiracanthium erraticum (Walckenaer, 1802) – Azores, Europe, Turkey, Caucasus, Russia (Europe to Far East), Iran, Central Asia, China, Korea, Japan
- Cheiracanthium eutittha Bösenberg & Strand, 1906 – Taiwan, Japan, Korea?
- Cheiracanthium falcatum Chen, Huang, Chen & Wang, 2006 – Taiwan
- Cheiracanthium filiapophysium Chen & Huang, 2012 – Taiwan
- Cheiracanthium foordi Lotz, 2015 – South Africa
- Cheiracanthium fulvotestaceum Simon, 1878 – France
- Cheiracanthium furculatum Karsch, 1879 – Cape Verde, Africa, Madagascar, Comoros
- Cheiracanthium gratum Kulczyński, 1897 – Germany, Hungary, Ukraine, Russia (Europe), Kazakhstan
- Cheiracanthium ienisteai Sterghiu, 1985 – Romania, Albania
- Cheiracanthium incertum O. Pickard-Cambridge, 1869 – Sri Lanka
- Cheiracanthium inclusum (Hentz, 1847) – North America, Central America, Caribbean, South America. Introduced to Réunion
- Cheiracanthium indicum O. Pickard-Cambridge, 1874 – India, Sri Lanka
- Cheiracanthium insigne O. Pickard-Cambridge, 1874 – India, Sri Lanka, Thailand, Myanmar, Laos, China, Taiwan
- Cheiracanthium insulanum (Thorell, 1878) – Indonesia (Moluccas: Ambon)
- Cheiracanthium insulare L. Koch, 1866 – Samoa
- Cheiracanthium insulare (Vinson, 1863) – Madagascar, Réunion
- Cheiracanthium margaritae Sterghiu, 1985 – Romania
- Cheiracanthium mildei L. Koch, 1864 – Azores, Europe, North Africa, Turkey, Middle East, Caucasus, Russia, (Europe). Introduced to North America, Argentina
- Cheiracanthium minshullae Lotz, 2007 – Zimbabwe, Botswana, South Africa
- Cheiracanthium occidentale L. Koch, 1882 – Spain (Minorca), Italy
- Cheiracanthium oncognathum Thorell, 1871 – Europe
- Cheiracanthium pennatum Simon, 1878 – Southern Europe, Romania
- Cheiracanthium punctorium (Villers, 1789) – Europe, Turkey, Caucasus, Russia (Europe to South Siberia), Iran, Central Asia (type species)
- Cheiracanthium salsicola Simon, 1932 – France
- Cheiracanthium schenkeli Caporiacco, 1949 – Kenya, Rwanda, Zambia, Zimbabwe, Botswana, South Africa
- Cheiracanthium shiluvanense Lotz, 2007 – South Africa
- Cheiracanthium taiwanicum Chen, Huang, Chen & Wang, 2006 – China, Taiwan
- Cheiracanthium taprobanense Strand, 1907 – Sri Lanka
- Cheiracanthium torsivum Chen & Huang, 2012 – Taiwan
- Cheiracanthium vansoni Lawrence, 1936 – Tanzania, Zambia, Namibia, Botswana, Mozambique, Zimbabwe, South Africa

Complete species list as of October 2025
- C. abbreviatum Simon, 1878 – France, Denmark
- C. aculeatum Simon, 1884 – Ivory Coast, Sudan, Somalia, Zambia, Namibia, Zimbabwe, South Africa
- C. aden Lotz, 2007 – Yemen
- C. adjacens O. Pickard-Cambridge, 1885 – Pakistan
- C. adjacensoides Song, Chen & Hou, 1990 – India, China, Taiwan, Philippines
- C. africanum Lessert, 1921 – Africa, Madagascar, Réunion
- C. aizwalense B. Biswas & K. Biswas, 2007 – India
- C. aladanense Lotz, 2007 – Yemen
- C. albidulum (Blackwall, 1859) – Madeira
- C. ambrense Lotz, 2014 – Madagascar
- C. ampijoroa Lotz, 2014 – Madagascar
- C. andamanense (Tikader, 1977) – India (Andaman Is.)
- C. andranomay Lotz, 2014 – Madagascar
- C. angolense Lotz, 2007 – Angola, Zimbabwe, South Africa
- C. angulitarse Simon, 1878 – Spain, France (Corsica), Italy, Malta, Hungary, Romania
- C. anjozorobe Lotz, 2014 – Madagascar
- C. annulipes O. Pickard-Cambridge, 1872 – Canary Islands, Portugal, Spain, Tunisia, Egypt, Israel
- C. antungense Chen & Huang, 2012 – Taiwan
- C. apia Platnick, 1998 – Samoa
- C. approximatum O. Pickard-Cambridge, 1885 – Pakistan, India, Myanmar, Laos to China, Taiwan, Philippines
- C. arcilongum Li & Zhang, 2023 – China
- C. ashleyi Lotz, 2014 – Madagascar
- C. auenati Caporiacco, 1936 – Libya
- C. auriculatum J. S. Zhang, G. R. Zhang & Yu, 2018 – China
- C. bannaensis Li & Zhang, 2024 – China
- C. bantaengi Merian, 1911 – Indonesia (Sulawesi)
- C. barbarum (Lucas, 1846) – Algeria
- C. bawanglingense Li & Zhang, 2024 – China (Hainan)
- C. bifurcatum Li & Zhang, 2024 – China
- C. boendense Lotz, 2015 – DR Congo
- C. brevicalcaratum L. Koch, 1873 – Indonesia (Lombok), Australia (Western Australia)
- C. brevidens Kroneberg, 1875 – Central Asia
- C. brevispinum Song, Feng & Shang, 1982 – Mongolia, China, Korea
- C. buri Esyunin & Efimik, 2021 – Russia (South Siberia)
- C. campestre Lohmander, 1944 – Sweden, Denmark, Central Europe, Italy, Romania, Ukraine, Russia (Europe)
- C. canariense Wunderlich, 1987 – Canary Islands, Turkey, Egypt
- C. catindigae Barrion & Litsinger, 1995 – Philippines
- C. caudatum (Thorell, 1887) – Myanmar
- C. chayuense Li & Zhang, 2019 – China
- C. circulum Li & Zhang, 2023 – China
- C. conflexum Simon, 1906 – India
- C. conspersum (Thorell, 1891) – India (Nicobar Is.)
- C. crucigerum Rainbow, 1920 – Australia (Norfolk Is.)
- C. danieli Tikader, 1975 – India
- C. daofeng Yu & Li, 2020 – China
- C. daquilium Barrion & Litsinger, 1995 – Indonesia, Philippines
- C. debile Simon, 1890 – Chad, Yemen
- C. denisi Caporiacco, 1939 – Ethiopia, Congo
- C. digitatum Li & Zhang, 2023 – China
- C. dippenaarae Lotz, 2007 – South Africa
- C. duanbi Yu & Li, 2020 – China
- C. echinulatum J. S. Zhang, G. R. Zhang & Yu, 2018 – China
- C. effossum Herman, 1879 – Central to eastern Europe
- C. elegans Thorell, 1875 – Europe, Turkey, Caucasus, Russia (Europe to South Siberia), Kazakhstan, Iran, Central Asia
- C. equestre O. Pickard-Cambridge, 1874 – Libya, Egypt
- C. erraticum (Walckenaer, 1802) – Azores, Europe, Turkey, Caucasus, Russia (Europe to Far East), Iran, Central Asia, China, Korea, Japan
- C. eutittha Bösenberg & Strand, 1906 – Taiwan, Japan, Korea?
- C. excavatum Rainbow, 1920 – Australia (Norfolk Is.)
- C. exilipes (Lucas, 1846) – Algeria
- C. exquestitum Zhang & Zhu, 1993 – China
- C. falcatum Chen, Huang, Chen & Wang, 2006 – Taiwan
- C. falcis Lotz, 2015 – Gabon
- C. festae Pavesi, 1895 – Israel
- C. fibrosum Zhang, Hu & Zhu, 1994 – China
- C. filiapophysium Chen & Huang, 2012 – Taiwan
- C. fisheri Lotz, 2014 – Madagascar
- C. floresense Wunderlich, 2008 – Azores
- C. foordi Lotz, 2015 – South Africa
- C. foulpointense Lotz, 2014 – Madagascar
- C. fujianense Gong, 1983 – China
- C. fulvotestaceum Simon, 1878 – France
- C. furax L. Koch, 1873 – Samoa
- C. furculatum Karsch, 1879 – Cape Verde, Africa, Madagascar, Comoros
- C. ghanaense Lotz, 2015 – Ghana
- C. gobi Schmidt & Barensteiner, 2000 – China
- C. gou Yu & Li, 2020 – China
- C. gracile L. Koch, 1873 – Australia (Queensland, New South Wales)
- C. gratum Kulczyński, 1897 – Germany, Hungary, Ukraine, Russia (Europe), Kazakhstan
- C. griswoldi Lotz, 2014 – Madagascar
- C. hainanense (Li & Zhang, 2024) – China (Hainan)
- C. halophilum Schmidt & Piepho, 1994 – Cape Verde
- C. haroniense Lotz, 2007 – Zimbabwe
- C. himalayense Gravely, 1931 – India
- C. hypocyrtum Zhang & Zhu, 1993 – China
- C. ienisteai Sterghiu, 1985 – Romania, Albania
- C. ilicis Morano & Bonal, 2016 – Spain
- C. impressum Thorell, 1881 – Australia (Queensland)
- C. incertum O. Pickard-Cambridge, 1869 – Sri Lanka
- C. inclusum (Hentz, 1847) – North America, Central America, Caribbean, South America. Introduced to Réunion
- C. incomptum (Thorell, 1891) – India (Nicobar Is.)
- C. indicum O. Pickard-Cambridge, 1874 – India, Sri Lanka
- C. inflatum Wang & Zhang, 2013 – China
- C. inornatum O. Pickard-Cambridge, 1874 – India
- C. insigne O. Pickard-Cambridge, 1874 – India, Sri Lanka, Thailand, Myanmar, Laos, China, Taiwan
- C. insulanum (Thorell, 1878) – Indonesia (Moluccas: Ambon)
- C. insulare L. Koch, 1866 – Samoa
- C. insulare (Vinson, 1863) – Madagascar, Réunion
- C. iranicum Esyunin & Zamani, 2020 – Iran, India
- C. isiacum O. Pickard-Cambridge, 1874 – Libya, Egypt
- C. itakeum Barrion & Litsinger, 1995 – Philippines
- C. jabalpurense Majumder & Tikader, 1991 – India
- C. japonicum Bösenberg & Strand, 1906 – Russia (Far East), Mongolia, China, Korea, Japan
- C. jiuquan Li & Zhang, 2023 – China
- C. jocquei Lotz, 2014 – Comoros, Madagascar
- C. joculare Simon, 1909 – São Tomé and Príncipe
- C. jorgeense Wunderlich, 2008 – Azores
- C. jovium Denis, 1947 – Egypt
- C. kabalense Lotz, 2015 – Uganda
- C. kakamega Lotz, 2015 – Kenya
- C. kakumense Lotz, 2015 – Ivory Coast, Ghana, Congo
- C. kashmirense Majumder & Tikader, 1991 – India
- C. kazachstanicum Ponomarev, 2007 – Kazakhstan
- C. kenyaense Lotz, 2007 – Africa
- C. kibonotense Lessert, 1921 – Ethiopia, DR Congo, Kenya, Tanzania, Uganda
- C. klabati Merian, 1911 – Indonesia (Sulawesi)
- C. knipperi Lotz, 2011 – Tanzania
- C. kupense Lotz, 2007 – Cameroon
- C. lanceolatum Chrysanthus, 1967 – Indonesia (New Guinea)
- C. lascivum Karsch, 1879 – Russia (Sakhalin), China, Korea, Japan
- C. leucophaeum Simon, 1897 – Madagascar
- C. ligawsolanum Barrion & Litsinger, 1995 – Philippines
- C. liplikeum Barrion & Litsinger, 1995 – Philippines
- C. liuyangense Xie, Yin, Yan & Kim, 1996 – China
- C. lompobattangi Merian, 1911 – Indonesia (Sulawesi)
- C. longipes (Thorell, 1890) – Indonesia (Sumatra)
- C. ludovici Lessert, 1921 – DR Congo, Kenya, Tanzania, Madagascar
- C. lukiense Lotz, 2015 – Congo
- C. madagascarense Lotz, 2014 – Comoros, Madagascar
- C. mahajanga Lotz, 2014 – Madagascar
- C. malkini Lotz, 2007 – Nigeria
- C. mangiferae Workman, 1896 – Singapore
- C. maraisi Lotz, 2007 – Namibia, Botswana
- C. margaritae Sterghiu, 1985 – Romania
- C. marplesi Chrysanthus, 1967 – Indonesia (New Guinea)
- C. mayombense Lotz, 2015 – Congo
- C. melanostomum (Thorell, 1895) – India, Bangladesh, Myanmar
- C. mertoni Strand, 1911 – Indonesia (Aru Is.)
- C. mildei L. Koch, 1864 – Azores, Europe, North Africa, Turkey, Middle East, Caucasus, Russia, (Europe). Introduced to North America, Argentina
- C. minahassae Merian, 1911 – Indonesia (Sulawesi)
- C. minshullae Lotz, 2007 – Zimbabwe, Botswana, South Africa
- C. minusculum Zamani & Marusik, 2025 – Iran
- C. minutum Baba & Tanikawa, 2024 – Japan (Ryukyu Is.)
- C. molle L. Koch, 1875 – Africa, Saudi Arabia
- C. mondrainense Main, 1954 – Australia (Western Australia)
- C. mongolicum Schenkel, 1963 – Mongolia
- C. monstrum Zamani & Marusik, 2025 – Iran
- C. montanum L. Koch, 1877 – Europe, Turkey, Caucasus, Iraq, Iran
- C. mordax L. Koch, 1866 – Japan, Australia, New Hebrides, Samoa, Solomon Islands, Tonga? French Polynesia?
- C. murinum (Thorell, 1895) – India, Myanmar
- C. mysorense Majumder & Tikader, 1991 – India, Bangladesh
- C. nalsaroverense B. H. Patel & H. K. Patel, 1973 – India
- C. nervosum Simon, 1909 – Australia (Western Australia)
- C. nickeli Lotz, 2011 – Mauritania
- C. occidentale L. Koch, 1882 – Spain (Minorca), Italy
- C. olliforme Zhang & Zhu, 1993 – China
- C. oncognathum Thorell, 1871 – Europe
- C. pauriense Majumder & Tikader, 1991 – India
- C. pelasgicum (C. L. Koch, 1837) – Mediterranean, Eastern Europe, Caucasus, Russia, (Europe)
- C. pennatum Simon, 1878 – Southern Europe, Romania
- C. pennuliferum Simon, 1909 – Australia (Western Australia)
- C. pennyi O. Pickard-Cambridge, 1873 – Europe, Turkey, Caucasus, Russia (Europe to South Siberia), Iran, Central Asia, China
- C. peregrinum Thorell, 1899 – Ivory Coast, Nigeria, Cameroon
- C. pichoni Schenkel, 1963 – China
- C. poonaense Majumder & Tikader, 1991 – India
- C. potanini Schenkel, 1963 – China
- C. punctipedellum Caporiacco, 1949 – DR Congo, Rwanda, Kenya
- C. punctorium (Villers, 1789) – Europe, Turkey, Caucasus, Russia (Europe to South Siberia), Iran, Central Asia (type species)
- C. punjabense Sadana & Bajaj, 1980 – India
- C. ransoni Lotz, 2014 – Madagascar
- C. rehobothense Strand, 1915 – Israel
- C. rothi Lotz, 2014 – Madagascar
- C. ruandana (Strand, 1916) – Rwanda
- C. rupicola (Thorell, 1897) – Myanmar, China, Indonesia
- C. russellsmithi Lotz, 2007 – Ethiopia
- C. rwandense Lotz, 2011 – Rwanda
- C. saccharanalis Mukhtar, 2015 – Pakistan
- C. sadanai Tikader, 1976 – India
- C. sakoemicum Roewer, 1938 – New Guinea
- C. salsicola Simon, 1932 – France
- C. sambii Patel & Reddy, 1991 – India
- C. sansibaricum Strand, 1907 – Ivory Coast to Zanzibar
- C. saraswatii Tikader, 1962 – India
- C. schenkeli Caporiacco, 1949 – Kenya, Rwanda, Zambia, Zimbabwe, Botswana, South Africa
- C. seidlitzi L. Koch, 1864 – Mediterranean to Central Asia
- C. seshii Patel & Reddy, 1991 – India
- C. shilabira Lotz, 2015 – Congo, Kenya
- C. shiluvanense Lotz, 2007 – South Africa
- C. sikkimense Majumder & Tikader, 1991 – India, Bangladesh
- C. silaceum Rainbow, 1897 – Australia (New South Wales)
- C. simaoense Zhang & Yin, 1999 – China
- C. simplex Thorell, 1899 – Cameroon, Nigeria
- C. sistani Zamani & Marusik, 2025 – Iran
- C. siwi El-Hennawy, 2001 – Egypt
- C. solidum Zhang, Zhu & Hu, 1993 – China
- C. soputani Merian, 1911 – Indonesia (Sulawesi)
- C. spectabile (Thorell, 1887) – Myanmar
- C. sphaericum Zhang, Zhu & Hu, 1993 – China
- C. stratioticum L. Koch, 1873 – Australia (Victoria, Tasmania), New Zealand
- C. streblowi L. Koch, 1879 – Russia (Middle and South Siberia)
- C. subinsulanum Li & Zhang, 2019 – China
- C. submordax Zhang, Zhu & Hu, 1993 – China, Taiwan, Japan
- C. taegense Paik, 1990 – China, Korea, Japan
- C. tagorei Biswas & Raychaudhuri, 2003 – Bangladesh
- C. taiwanicum Chen, Huang, Chen & Wang, 2006 – China, Taiwan
- C. tanmoyi Biswas & Roy, 2005 – India
- C. tanzanense Lotz, 2015 – Tanzania
- C. taprobanense Strand, 1907 – Sri Lanka
- C. tenue L. Koch, 1873 – Australia (Queensland)
- C. tetragnathoide Caporiacco, 1949 – Kenya
- C. tigbauanense Barrion & Litsinger, 1995 – Philippines
- C. torricellianum Strand, 1911 – New Guinea
- C. torsivum Chen & Huang, 2012 – Taiwan
- C. triviale (Thorell, 1895) – India, Myanmar
- C. trivittatum Simon, 1906 – India
- C. truncatum (Thorell, 1895) – Myanmar
- C. turanicum Kroneberg, 1875 – Uzbekistan, Tajikistan
- C. turiae Strand, 1917 – Thailand to Australia (Queensland)
- C. uncinatum Paik, 1985 – China, Korea
- C. unicum Bösenberg & Strand, 1906 – Korea, Japan, China, Laos
- C. vankhedei Marusik & Fomichev, 2016 – Mongolia
- C. vansoni Lawrence, 1936 – Tanzania, Zambia, Namibia, Botswana, Mozambique, Zimbabwe, South Africa
- C. verdense Lotz, 2011 – Cape Verde
- C. virescens (Sundevall, 1833) – Europe, Caucasus, Russia (Europe to Far East), Iran, China
- C. vorax O. Pickard-Cambridge, 1874 – India
- C. warsai Mukhtar, 2015 – Pakistan
- C. wiehlei Chrysanthus, 1967 – Indonesia (New Guinea)
- C. wilma (Benoit, 1977) – St. Helena
- C. wuquan Yu & Li, 2020 – China
- C. xinjiangense Li & Zhang, 2023 – China
- C. zebrinum Savelyeva, 1972 – Russia (South Siberia), Kazakhstan
- C. zhejiangense Hu & Song, 1982 – China, Korea

== See also ==
- List of spiders associated with cutaneous reactions
