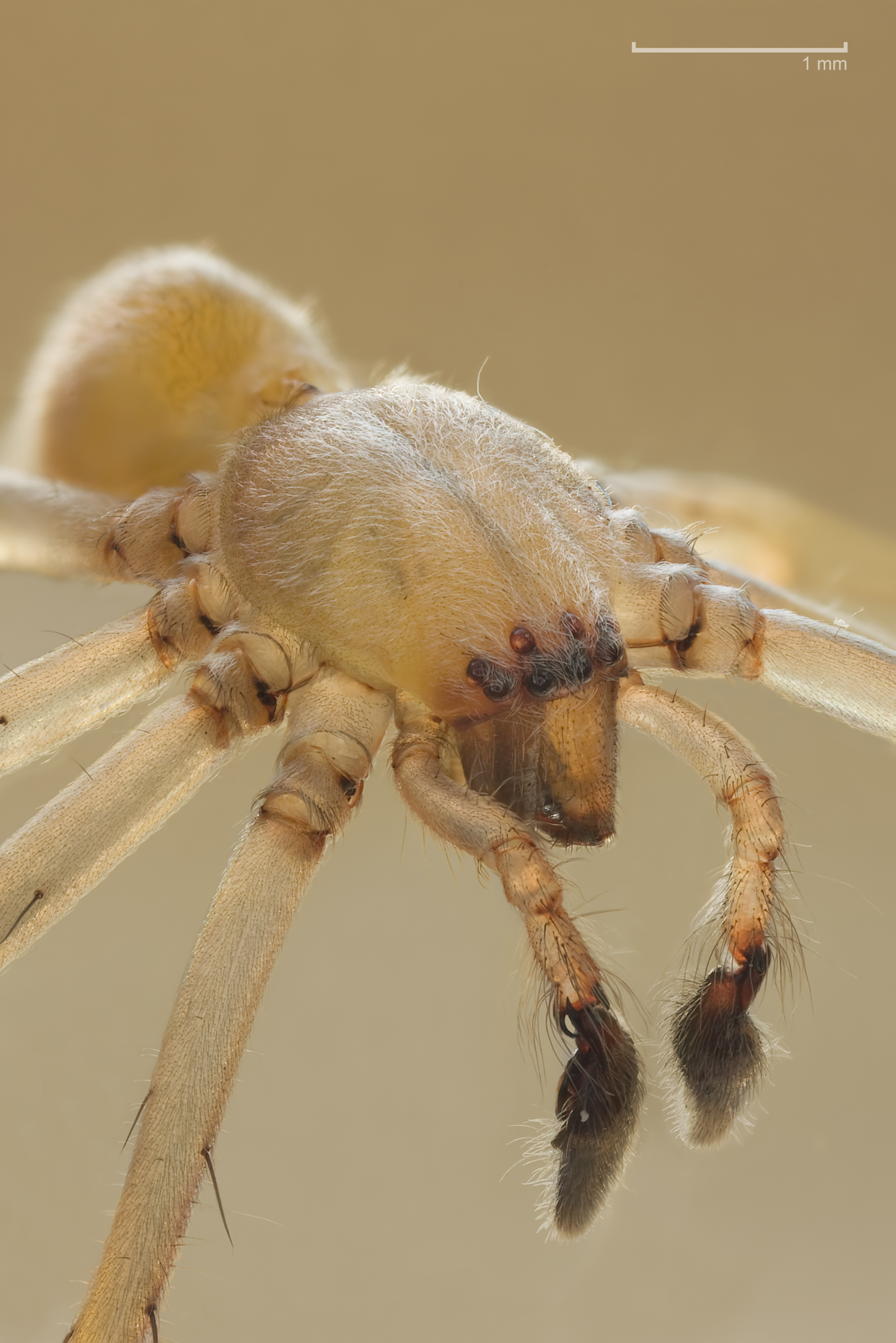
- Male

Scientific classification
- Kingdom: Animalia
- Phylum: Arthropoda
- Subphylum: Chelicerata
- Class: Arachnida
- Order: Araneae
- Infraorder: Araneomorphae
- Family: Cheiracanthiidae
- Genus: Cheiracanthium
- Species: C. mildei

Binomial name
- Cheiracanthium mildei L. Koch, 1864

Synonyms
- Cheiracanthium anceps O. Pickard-Cambridge, 1872; Cheiracanthium strasseni Strand, 1915; Cheiracanthium cretense Roewer, 1928

= Cheiracanthium mildei =

Species of spider

Cheiracanthium mildei is a species of spider from the family Cheiracanthiidae. C. mildei is commonly known as the northern yellow sac spider, a name it partially shares with many other spiders of its genus. Alternatively, it is also called the long-legged sac spider.

== Description ==
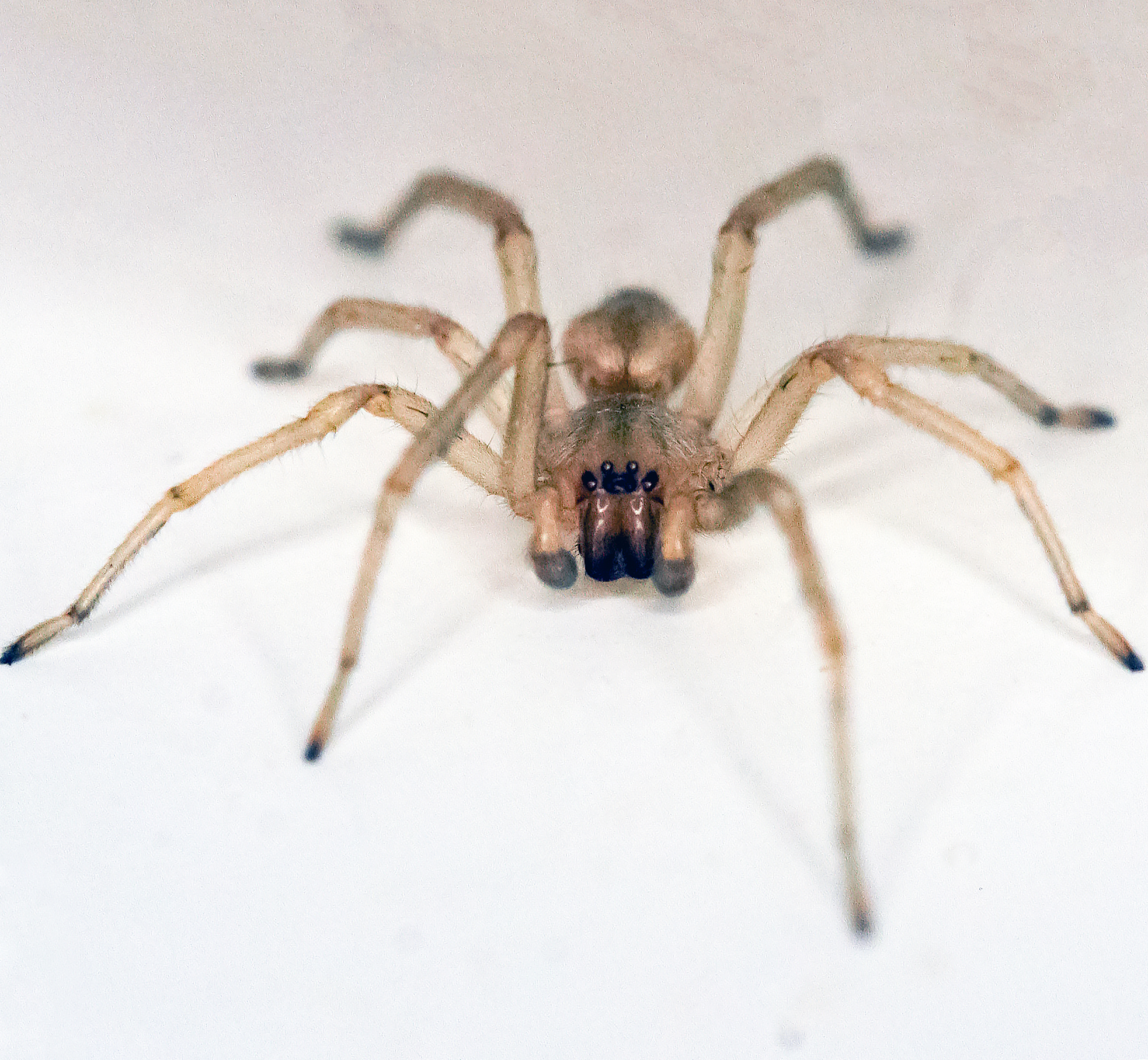
Male

C. mildei usually has a pale green or tan body, with darker brown palpi and chelicerae. An adult C. mildei is usually 7–10 millimetres (0.3–0.4 in) in body size. Each leg ends in double claws, and the front pair is significantly longer (up to two times the size). The eyes have a tapetum lucidum that reflects back to the light source once lit, however the "canoe-shaped" tapetum they possess is incapable of forming sharp images, so the benefit of these tapeta is uncertain, although they may assist in navigation through the detection of the polarization of light from the sky. Although this spider can bite humans, the effects appear to be mild.

== Habitat and distribution ==
C. mildei is native to Europe and North Africa through the Caucasus to Central Asia. It has been introduced to the United States and parts of South America. It is widespread across the northeastern United States and eastern Canada, and is more often found inside rather than outside. It may have been first introduced from Europe into the Americas during periods of colonization.

== Prey ==
C. mildei is a dominant predator of S. littoralis (a moth species) in Africa and Middle Eastern regions. The mechanism of predation include causing direct death by consuming the larvae and causing indirect death by dispersing larvae from its host plants.
