= Cheiracanthium filiapophysium =

Scientific classification
- Domain: Eukaryota
- Kingdom: Animalia
- Phylum: Arthropoda
- Subphylum: Chelicerata
- Class: Arachnida
- Order: Araneae
- Infraorder: Araneomorphae
- Family: Cheiracanthiidae
- Genus: Cheiracanthium
- Species: C. filiapophysium

Binomial name
- Cheiracanthium filiapophysium Chen et Huang, 2012

Species of spider

Cheiracanthium filiapophysium, known in Mandarin Chinese as "絲距紅螯蛛" or Thread spur red chelate spider, is a species of yellow sac spider endemic to Taiwan.

== Description ==
C. filiapophysium are yellowish brown in color, with a pale grayish brown dorsal cardiac pattern on their abdomens. They lack a thoracic furrow. Their chelicerae sport three teeth on both the promargin and retromargin of each fang groove. Males have well-developed palpal bulbs. They most resemble C. torsivum but may be distinguished by their long, thin, and curved cymbial spurs and pear-shaped spermatheca.

== Etymology ==
The species name "filiapophysium" means "thread-like apophysis, referring to the thin, long, and curved cymbial spur on the male pedipalp.
