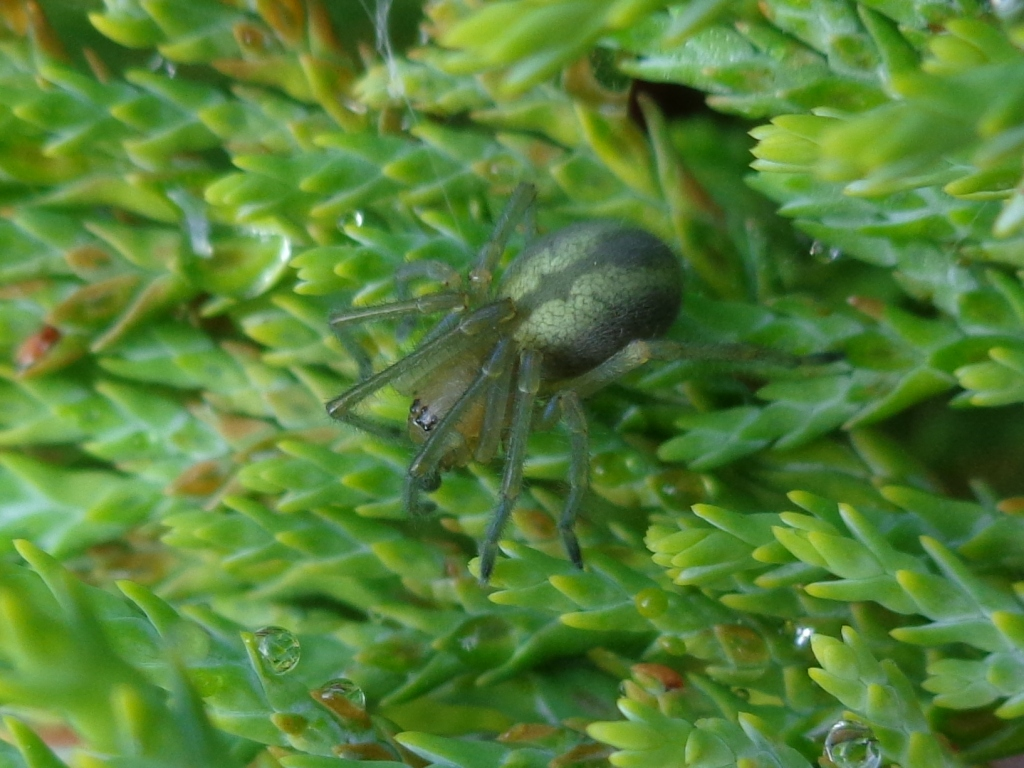

Scientific classification
- Domain: Eukaryota
- Kingdom: Animalia
- Phylum: Arthropoda
- Subphylum: Chelicerata
- Class: Arachnida
- Order: Araneae
- Infraorder: Araneomorphae
- Family: Cheiracanthiidae
- Genus: Cheiracanthium
- Species: C. erraticum

Binomial name
- Cheiracanthium erraticum (Walckenaer, 1802)

Synonyms
- Aranea erratica Walckenaer, 1802; Clubiona erratica (Walckenaer, 1802); Clubiona dumetorum Hahn, 1833; Bolyphantes equestris C. L. Koch, 1837; Cheiracanthium carnifex C. L. Koch, 1839; Cheiracanthium erraticum (Walckenaer, 1802); Anyphaena erratica (Walckenaer, 1802); Cheiracanthium erroneum O. Pickard-Cambridge, 1873; Cheiracanthium orientale Kulczyński, 1885

= Cheiracanthium erraticum =

Species of spider

Cheiracanthium erraticum, the two-clawed hunting spider, is a species of Palearctic spider of the family Cheiracanthiidae.

== Description ==
Females have a body length of 8–9 mm (0.31–0.35 in), males 5–6.5 mm (0.20–0.26 in). C. erraticum is a distinctively marked spider which shows a wide dark red stripe running down the centre of the abdomen, which is in turn surrounded by an area of creamy-yellow while the head is a reddish brown.

== Distribution ==
The species has a Palearctic distribution, from Ireland to east Asia.

== Habitat ==
This species favours the herbaceous layer and low bush layer of open habitats, such as rough heather. In Britain the altitudinal range is from sea level to 700 m.

== Biology ==
In early summer C. erraticum builds a retreat made from two or three leaves or grass heads which are stitched together to hold the female and her egg sac. Later in the year, the immature spiders, which are already showing the reddish median stripe on the abdomen, can be found in small silk cells on plant stems. Adult males are encountered mostly in late spring and early summer while the adult females are mostly found from late spring to the autumn.

The spider wasp Homonotus sanguinolentus is a rare species which is wholly dependent on Cheiracanthium spiders and in Britain is wholly dependent on C. erraticum. The ichneumonid wasp Schizopyga podagrica is another parasitoid of C. erraticum.
