= Cheiramiona regis =

Royal Natal Long-legged Sac Spider

Conservation status
- Least Concern (SANBI Red List)

Scientific classification
- Kingdom: Animalia
- Phylum: Arthropoda
- Subphylum: Chelicerata
- Class: Arachnida
- Order: Araneae
- Infraorder: Araneomorphae
- Family: Cheiracanthiidae
- Genus: Cheiramiona
- Species: C. regis

Binomial name
- Cheiramiona regis Lotz, 2002

Species of spider

Cheiramiona regis is a species of spider in the family Cheiracanthiidae. It is a South African endemic described from Royal Natal National Park in KwaZulu-Natal.

== Distribution ==
The species is presently known only from two provinces at elevations from 1686 to 2985 m above sea level.

== Habitat ==
This species is a free-living plant dweller collected from pitfall traps and under rocks in the Grassland Biome.

== Conservation ==
Some more sampling is needed to determine the species' range, however it can survive in transformed habitats and is therefore listed as Least Concern. It is protected in Platberg Nature Reserve and Royal Natal National Park.
