= Cheiramiona qachasneki =

Maluti Long-legged Sac Spider

Scientific classification
- Kingdom: Animalia
- Phylum: Arthropoda
- Subphylum: Chelicerata
- Class: Arachnida
- Order: Araneae
- Infraorder: Araneomorphae
- Family: Cheiracanthiidae
- Genus: Cheiramiona
- Species: C. qachasneki

Binomial name
- Cheiramiona qachasneki Lotz, 2015

Species of spider

Cheiramiona qachasneki is a species of spider in the family Cheiracanthiidae. It is a South African Eastern Cape endemic described from Qachas Nek.

== Distribution ==
The species is presently known only from two males sampled from areas in the Maluti Mountains at elevations from 1602–1902 m above sea level. It might also be present in Lesotho.

== Habitat ==
This species is a free-living plant dweller collected by sweeping montane grassland at 1700 m above sea level in the Grassland Biome.

== Conservation ==
The species is listed as Data Deficient because more sampling is needed to collect females and determine its full range.
