= Cheiramiona simplicitarsis =

Northern Cape Long-legged Sac Spider

Conservation status
- Least Concern (SANBI Red List)

Scientific classification
- Kingdom: Animalia
- Phylum: Arthropoda
- Subphylum: Chelicerata
- Class: Arachnida
- Order: Araneae
- Infraorder: Araneomorphae
- Family: Cheiracanthiidae
- Genus: Cheiramiona
- Species: C. simplicitarsis

Binomial name
- Cheiramiona simplicitarsis (Simon, 1910)

Species of spider

Cheiramiona simplicitarsis is a species of spider in the family Cheiracanthiidae. It is a South African endemic originally described from Kamaggas in Northern Cape.

== Distribution ==
The species is known from three provinces at elevations from 576–1341 m above sea level.

== Habitat ==
This species is a free-living plant dweller recorded from the Succulent Karoo, Nama Karoo and Savanna biomes.

== Conservation ==
Due to its wide geographical range, the species is listed as Least Concern. It is protected in Lhuvhondo Nature Reserve, Anysberg Nature Reserve and Tswalu Game Reserve.
