= Cheiramiona baviaan =

Baviaanskloof Long-legged Sac Spider

Scientific classification
- Kingdom: Animalia
- Phylum: Arthropoda
- Subphylum: Chelicerata
- Class: Arachnida
- Order: Araneae
- Infraorder: Araneomorphae
- Family: Cheiracanthiidae
- Genus: Cheiramiona
- Species: C. baviaan

Binomial name
- Cheiramiona baviaan Lotz, 2015

Species of spider

Cheiramiona baviaan is a species of spider in the family Cheiracanthiidae. It is a South African Eastern Cape endemic described from Baviaanskloof near Hankey.

== Distribution ==
The species is known only from a single specimen sampled in 2008 at 30 m above sea level.

== Habitat ==
This species is a free-living plant dweller. The specimen was sampled by sweeping grass in the Fynbos Biome.

== Conservation ==
The species is listed as Data Deficient because more sampling is needed to collect males and determine its full range.
