= Cheiramiona akermani =

Akerman's Long Legged Sac Spider

Scientific classification
- Kingdom: Animalia
- Phylum: Arthropoda
- Subphylum: Chelicerata
- Class: Arachnida
- Order: Araneae
- Infraorder: Araneomorphae
- Family: Cheiracanthiidae
- Genus: Cheiramiona
- Species: C. akermani

Binomial name
- Cheiramiona akermani (Lawrence, 1942)

Species of spider

Cheiramiona akermani is a species of spider in the family Cheiracanthiidae. It is a KwaZulu-Natal endemic originally described from Pietermaritzburg.

== Distribution ==
The species is found at elevations from 416-623 m above sea level.

== Habitat ==
This species is a free-living plant dweller that constructs silk retreats in rolled-up leaves. It has been sampled from the Savanna Biome.

== Conservation ==
The species is listed as Data Deficient because more sampling is needed to collect females and determine its full range. It is protected in Oribi Gorge Nature Reserve.
