= Cheiramiona haddadi =

Haddad's Long-legged Sac Spider

Scientific classification
- Kingdom: Animalia
- Phylum: Arthropoda
- Subphylum: Chelicerata
- Class: Arachnida
- Order: Araneae
- Infraorder: Araneomorphae
- Family: Cheiracanthiidae
- Genus: Cheiramiona
- Species: C. haddadi

Binomial name
- Cheiramiona haddadi Lotz, 2015

Species of spider

Cheiramiona haddadi is a species of spider in the family Cheiracanthiidae. It is a South African KwaZulu-Natal endemic described from Ndumo Game Reserve.

== Distribution ==
The species is found at 36 m above sea level.

== Habitat ==
This species is a free-living plant dweller collected by beating short shrubs in the Savanna Biome.

== Conservation ==
The species is listed as Data Deficient because more sampling is needed to collect females and determine its full range. It is presently protected in Ndumo Game Reserve.
