= Cheiramiona kirkspriggsi =

Kirk-Spriggs' Long-legged Sac Spider

Conservation status
- Least Concern (SANBI Red List)

Scientific classification
- Kingdom: Animalia
- Phylum: Arthropoda
- Subphylum: Chelicerata
- Class: Arachnida
- Order: Araneae
- Infraorder: Araneomorphae
- Family: Cheiracanthiidae
- Genus: Cheiramiona
- Species: C. kirkspriggsi

Binomial name
- Cheiramiona kirkspriggsi Lotz, 2015

Species of spider

Cheiramiona kirkspriggsi is a species of spider in the family Cheiracanthiidae. It is a South African KwaZulu-Natal endemic described from Ndumo Game Reserve.

== Distribution ==
The species is presently known from the Ndumo and Ithala Game Reserves at elevations from 646–1000 m above sea level.

== Habitat ==
This species is a free-living plant dweller collected from short shrubs and from under tree bark in the Savanna Biome.

== Conservation ==
Despite having a relatively restricted distribution, this species can survive in transformed habitats, and to date is only known from protected areas, therefore listed as Least Concern. It is protected in Ndumo and Ithala Game Reserves.
