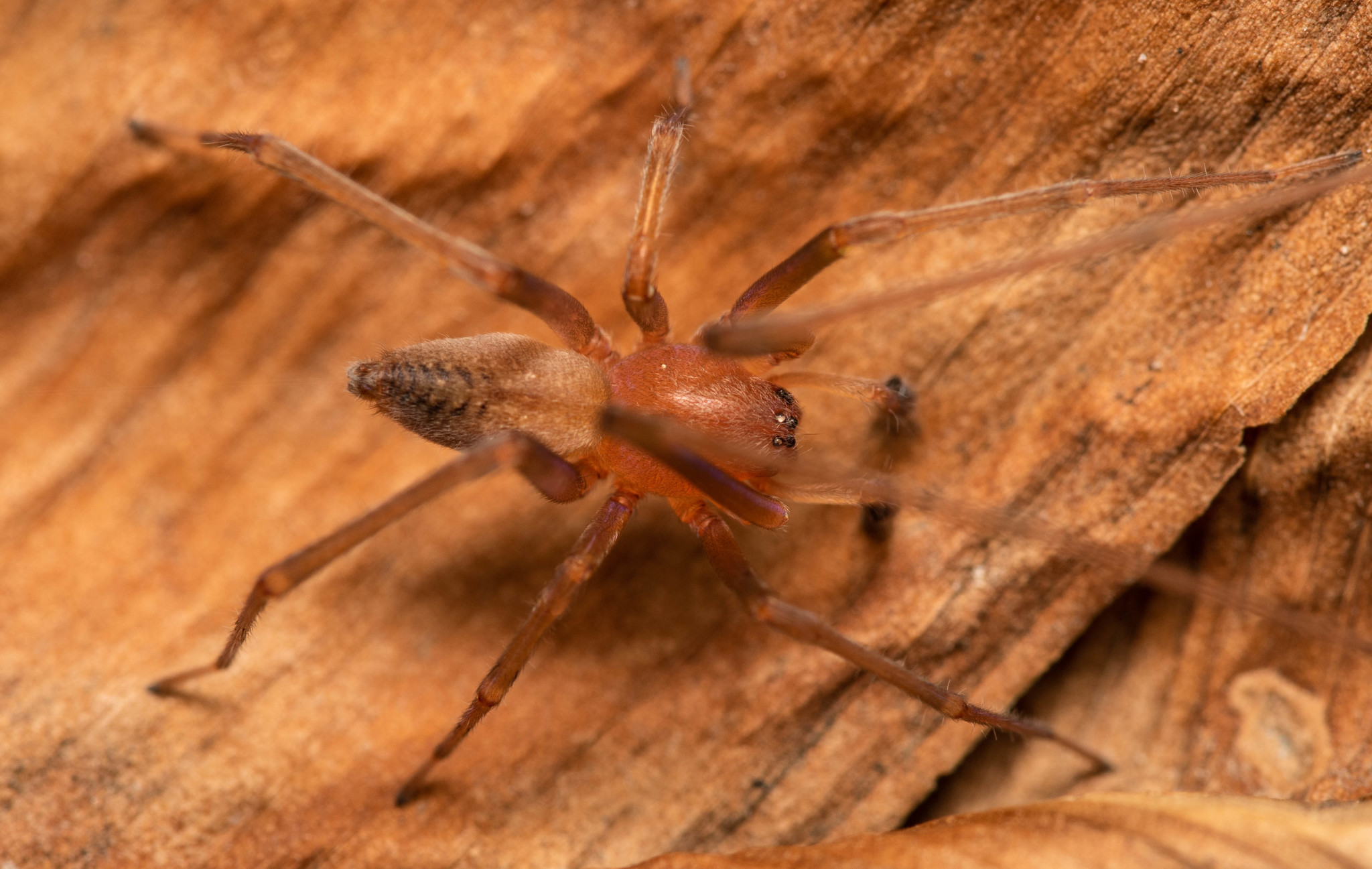
- male
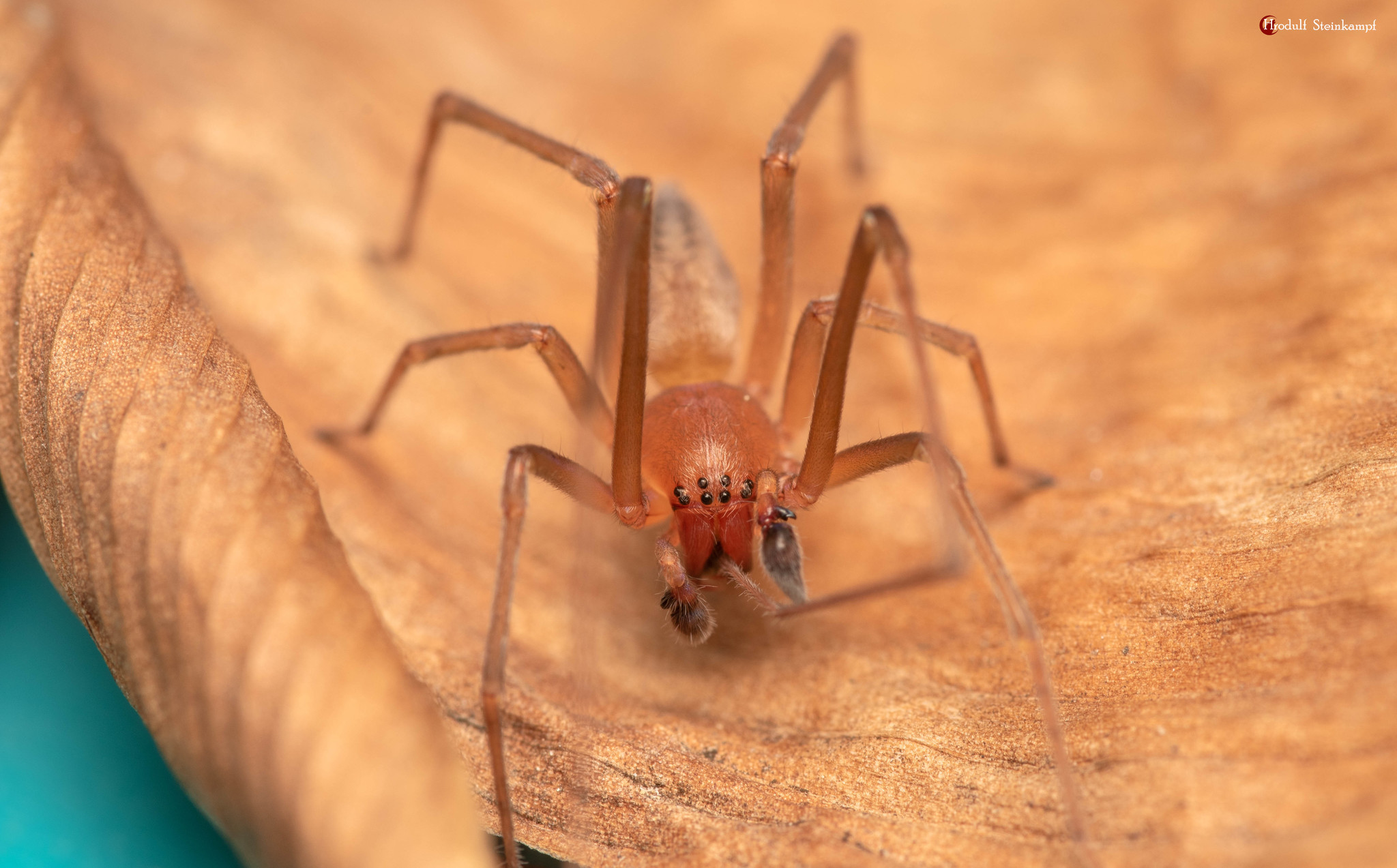
- male

Scientific classification
- Kingdom: Animalia
- Phylum: Arthropoda
- Subphylum: Chelicerata
- Class: Arachnida
- Order: Araneae
- Infraorder: Araneomorphae
- Family: Cheiracanthiidae
- Genus: Cheiramiona
- Species: C. collinita

Binomial name
- Cheiramiona collinita (Lawrence, 1938)

= Cheiramiona collinita =

KwaZulu-Natal Long-legged Sac Spider

Species of spider

Cheiramiona collinita is a species of spider in the family Cheiracanthiidae. It is a South African endemic originally described from KwaZulu-Natal.

== Distribution ==
The species is known from two provinces at elevations from 20-1312 m above sea level.

== Description ==
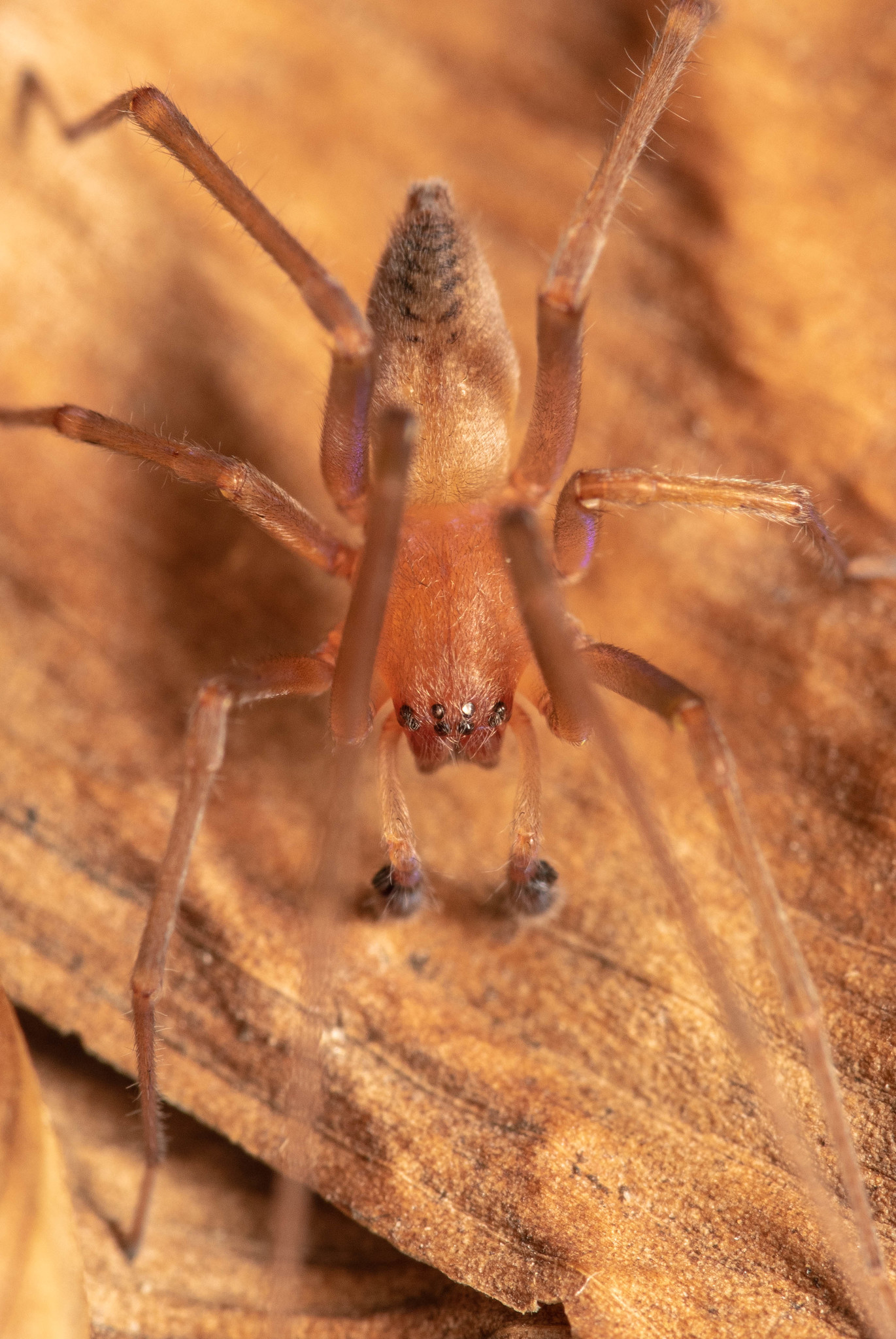
male

== Habitat ==
This species is a free-living plant dweller sampled from the Grassland, Indian Ocean Belt, Forest and Savanna biomes.

== Conservation ==
Due to its wide geographic range, it is listed as Least Concern. The species is protected in Vernon Crookes Nature Reserve and Tsitsikamma National Park.
