= Cheiramiona tembensis =

Tembe Long-legged sac spider

Scientific classification
- Kingdom: Animalia
- Phylum: Arthropoda
- Subphylum: Chelicerata
- Class: Arachnida
- Order: Araneae
- Infraorder: Araneomorphae
- Family: Cheiracanthiidae
- Genus: Cheiramiona
- Species: C. tembensis

Binomial name
- Cheiramiona tembensis Lotz, 2015

Species of spider

Cheiramiona tembensis is a species of spider in the family Cheiracanthiidae. It is a South African KwaZulu-Natal endemic described from Tembe Elephant Park.

== Distribution ==
The species is known only from a single male from the type locality at 93 m above sea level.

== Habitat ==
This species is a free-living plant dweller collected by beating short shrubs in sand forest in the Savanna Biome.

== Conservation ==
The species is listed as Data Deficient because more sampling is needed to collect females and determine its full range.
