= Cheiramiona plaatbosensis =

Plaatbos Long-legged Sac Spider

Conservation status
- Least Concern (SANBI Red List)

Scientific classification
- Kingdom: Animalia
- Phylum: Arthropoda
- Subphylum: Chelicerata
- Class: Arachnida
- Order: Araneae
- Infraorder: Araneomorphae
- Family: Cheiracanthiidae
- Genus: Cheiramiona
- Species: C. plaatbosensis

Binomial name
- Cheiramiona plaatbosensis Lotz, 2015

Species of spider

Cheiramiona plaatbosensis is a species of spider in the family Cheiracanthiidae. It is a South African endemic described from Plaatbos Nature Reserve in the Eastern Cape.

== Distribution ==
The species is known only from the southern parts of South Africa at elevations from 45–203 m above sea level.

== Habitat ==
This species is a free-living plant dweller collected from leaf litter in the Forest Biome.

== Conservation ==
Despite having a relatively restricted distribution, this species can survive in transformed habitats and is therefore listed as Least Concern. It is protected in Plaatbos Nature Reserve, Kasouga Coastal Reserve and Diepwalle Forest Station.
