= Cheiramiona saniensis =

Sani Pass Long-legged Sac Spider

Conservation status
- Least Concern (SANBI Red List)

Scientific classification
- Kingdom: Animalia
- Phylum: Arthropoda
- Subphylum: Chelicerata
- Class: Arachnida
- Order: Araneae
- Infraorder: Araneomorphae
- Family: Cheiracanthiidae
- Genus: Cheiramiona
- Species: C. saniensis

Binomial name
- Cheiramiona saniensis Lotz, 2015

Species of spider

Cheiramiona saniensis is a species of spider in the family Cheiracanthiidae. It is a South African KwaZulu-Natal endemic described from Sani Pass.

== Distribution ==
The species is presently known only from a few localities in western parts of KwaZulu-Natal at elevations from 1111–2985 m above sea level, along the border with Lesotho.

== Habitat ==
This species is a free-living plant dweller collected in pit traps and by hand under low-growing plants in mountain grassland in the Grassland Biome.

== Conservation ==
Despite having a relatively restricted distribution, this species can survive in transformed habitats and is therefore listed as Least Concern. It is protected in Cathedral Peak Nature Reserve and Injasuti Nature Reserve.
