= Cheiramiona debeeri =

Debeer's Long-legged Sac Spider

Scientific classification
- Kingdom: Animalia
- Phylum: Arthropoda
- Subphylum: Chelicerata
- Class: Arachnida
- Order: Araneae
- Infraorder: Araneomorphae
- Family: Cheiracanthiidae
- Genus: Cheiramiona
- Species: C. debeeri

Binomial name
- Cheiramiona debeeri Lotz, 2015

Species of spider

Cheiramiona debeeri is a species of spider in the family Cheiracanthiidae. It is a South African endemic described from Mariepskop, Mpumalanga.

== Distribution ==
The species is presently known only from the male sampled in 2013 from the type locality at 1,328 m above sea level.

== Habitat ==
This species is a free-living plant dweller collected from vegetation in Afromontane forest in the Forest Biome.

== Conservation ==
The species is listed as Data Deficient because more sampling is needed to collect females and determine its full range.
