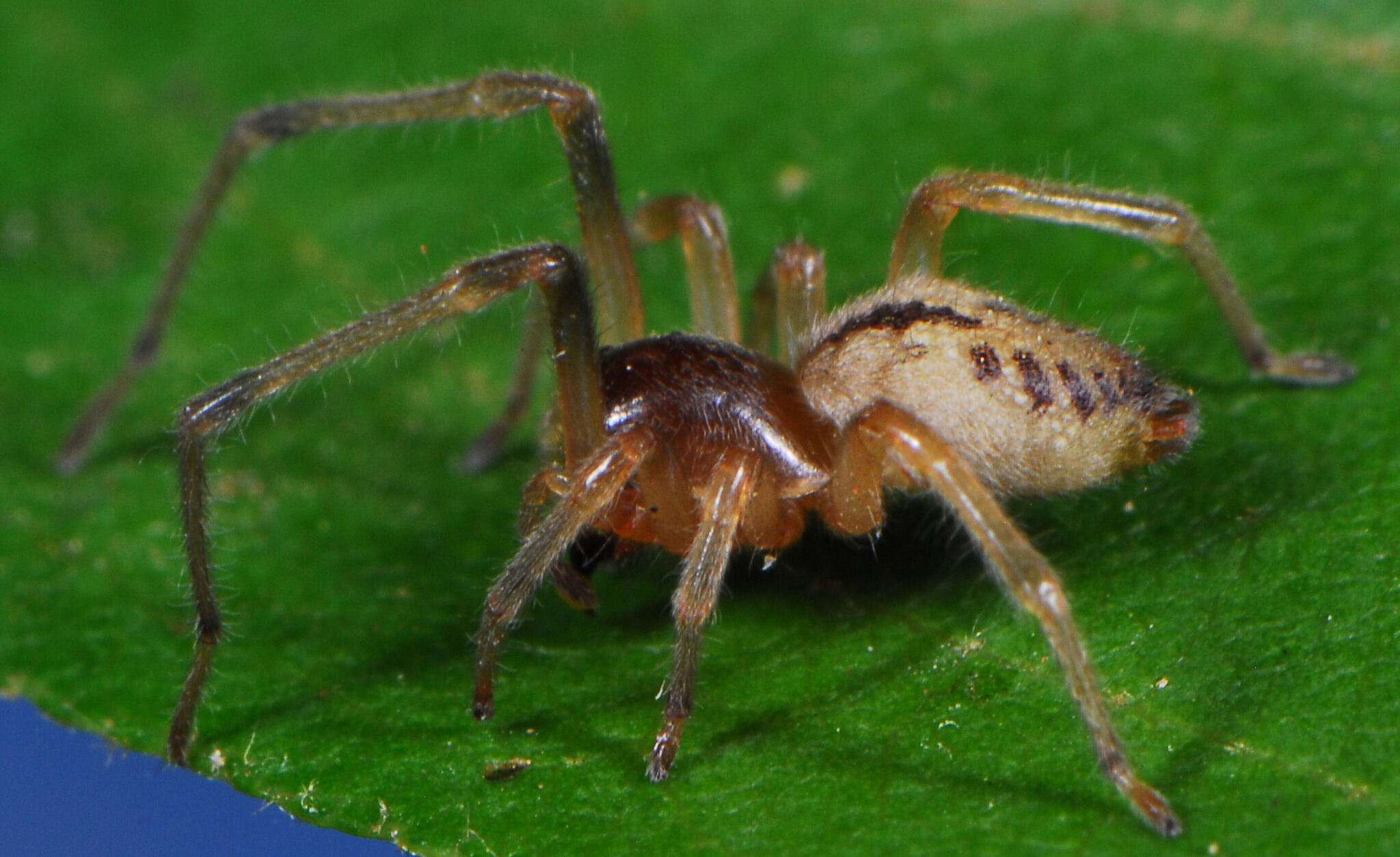
- Female
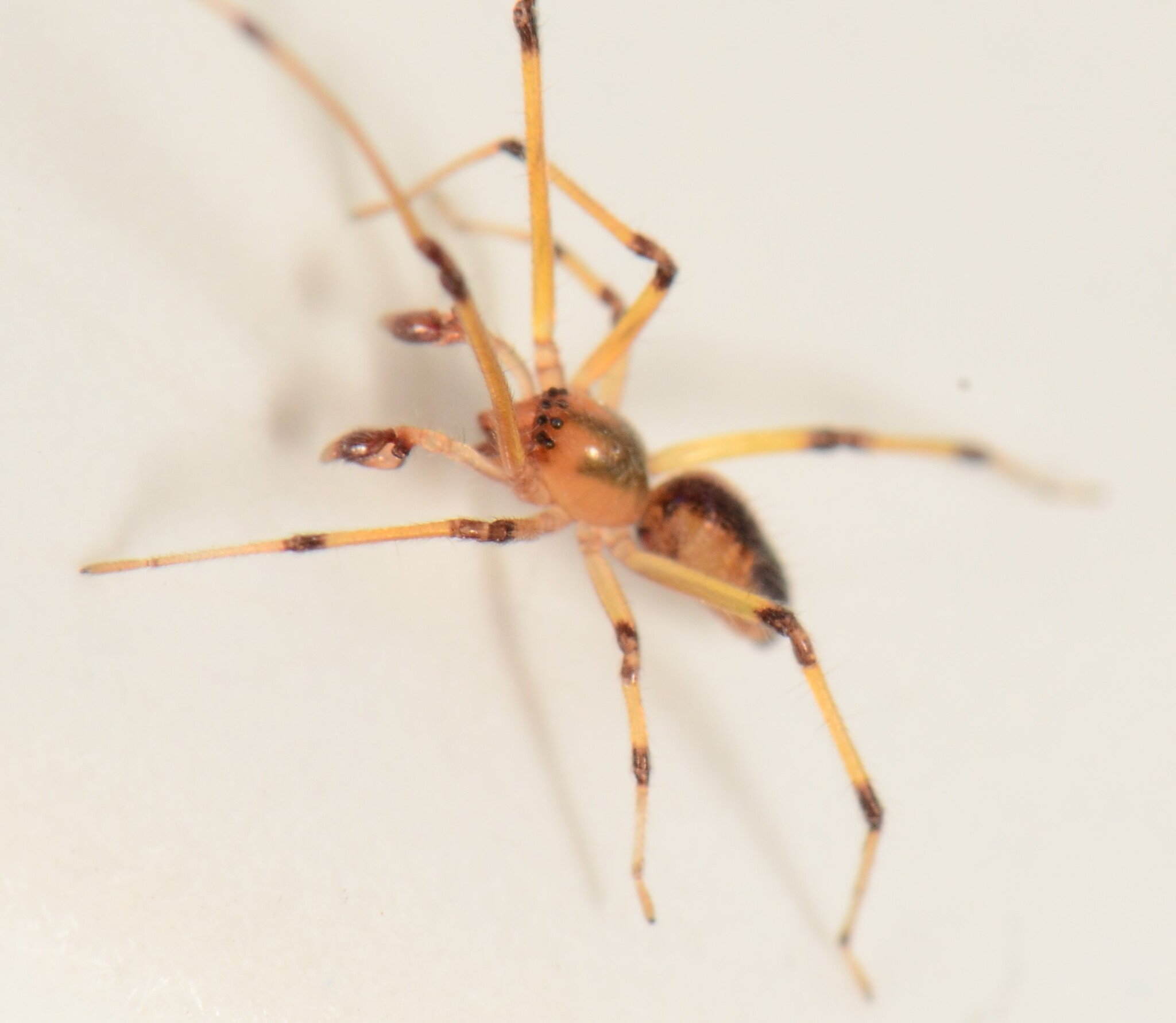
- Male

Scientific classification
- Kingdom: Animalia
- Phylum: Arthropoda
- Subphylum: Chelicerata
- Class: Arachnida
- Order: Araneae
- Infraorder: Araneomorphae
- Family: Cheiracanthiidae
- Genus: Cheiramiona
- Species: C. clavigera

Binomial name
- Cheiramiona clavigera (Simon, 1897)

= Cheiramiona clavigera =

Zululand Long-legged Sac Spider

Species of spider

Cheiramiona clavigera is a species of spider in the family Cheiracanthiidae. It is a South African endemic originally described from "Zululand" and serves as the type species of the genus Cheiramiona.

== Distribution ==
The species is known from four provinces including eight protected areas at elevations from 3–1588 m above sea level.

== Habitat ==
This species is a free-living plant dweller collected by various methods including hand collecting, beating, sweeping and pitfall traps. It was sampled from rehabilitated coastal dune forest at Richards Bay and occurs in the Forest, Fynbos, Indian Ocean Coastal Belt, Savanna and Thicket biomes.

== Description ==
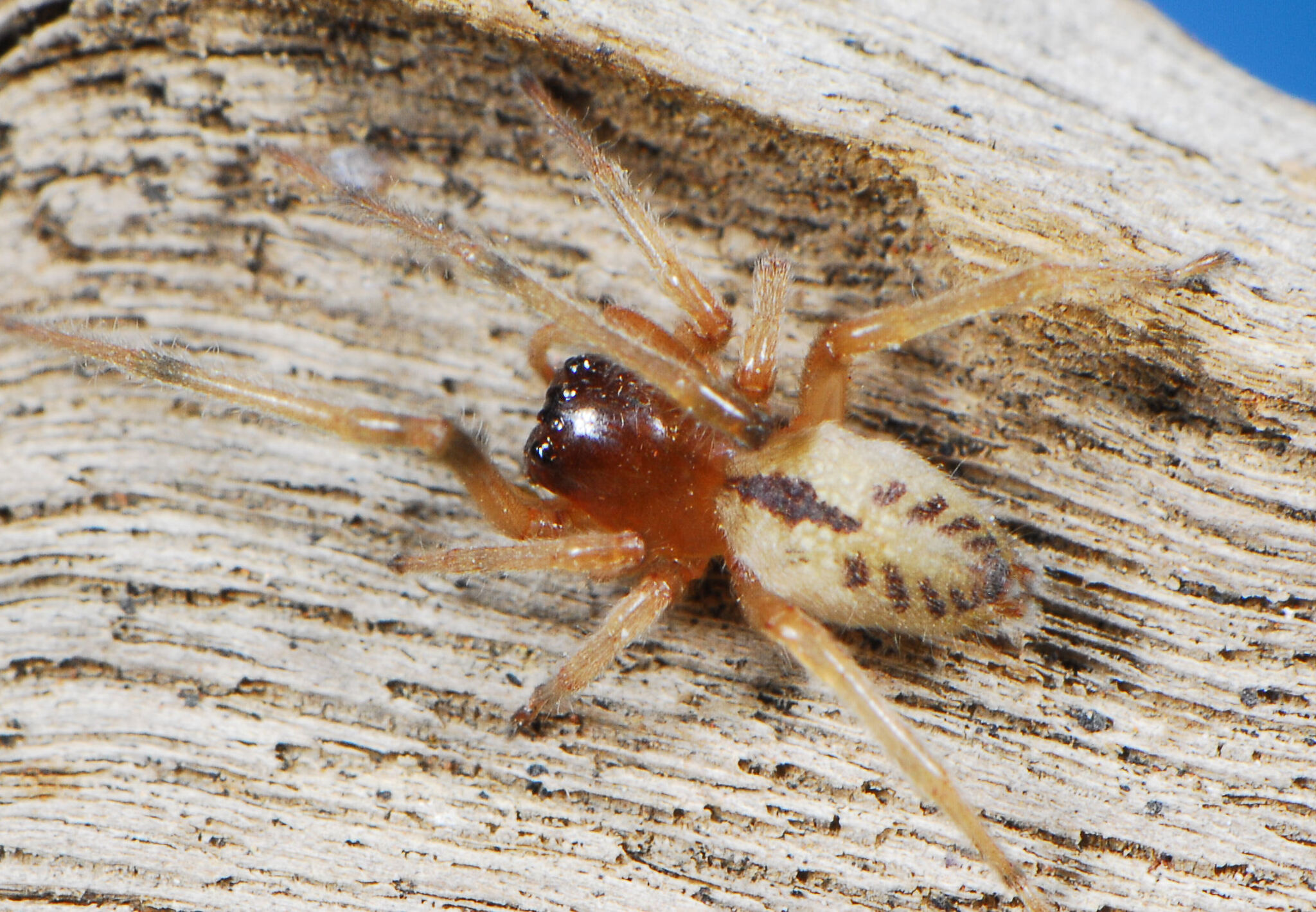
female

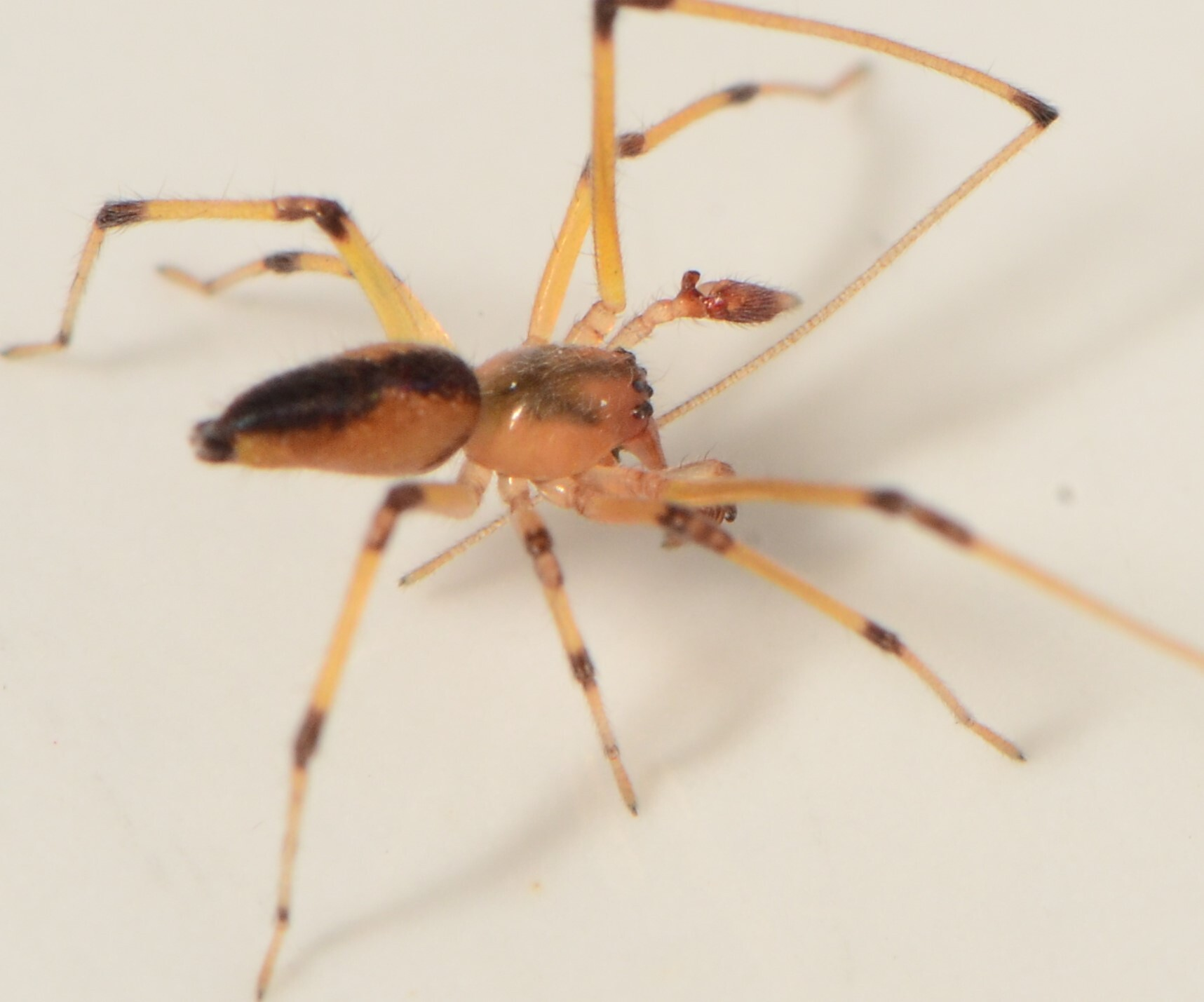
male

== Conservation ==
Due to its wide geographical range, it is listed as Least Concern. The species is protected in several areas including Addo Elephant National Park, Cwebe Nature Reserve, Vernon Crookes Nature Reserve, and Ndumo Game Reserve.
