= Cheiramiona amarifontis =

Bitterfontein Long Legged Sac Spider

Conservation status
- Least Concern (SANBI Red List)

Scientific classification
- Kingdom: Animalia
- Phylum: Arthropoda
- Subphylum: Chelicerata
- Class: Arachnida
- Order: Araneae
- Infraorder: Araneomorphae
- Family: Cheiracanthiidae
- Genus: Cheiramiona
- Species: C. amarifontis

Binomial name
- Cheiramiona amarifontis Lotz, 2002

Species of spider

Cheiramiona amarifontis is a species of spider in the family Cheiracanthiidae. It is a South African endemic described from Bitterfontein in the Western Cape.

== Distribution ==
The species is known from several localities in two provinces at elevations from 69–1503 m above sea level.

== Habitat ==
These are free-living plant dwellers sampled from under shrubs in humus and on bushes in the Fynbos, Grassland and Thicket biomes.

== Conservation ==
Despite being recorded from localities transformed for urbanization and crop farming, the species can survive in transformed habitats and is listed as Least Concern. It is protected in Anysberg Nature Reserve and Jacobs Bay Nature Reserve.
