= Cheiramiona boschrandensis =

Free State Long-legged Sac Spider

Scientific classification
- Kingdom: Animalia
- Phylum: Arthropoda
- Subphylum: Chelicerata
- Class: Arachnida
- Order: Araneae
- Infraorder: Araneomorphae
- Family: Cheiracanthiidae
- Genus: Cheiramiona
- Species: C. boschrandensis

Binomial name
- Cheiramiona boschrandensis Lotz, 2015

Species of spider

Cheiramiona boschrandensis is a species of spider in the family Cheiracanthiidae. It is a South African Free State endemic described from Fauresmith.

== Distribution ==
The species is known only from two localities at elevations from 1250–1373 m above sea level.

== Habitat ==
This species is a free-living plant dweller. The female was collected in the Grassland Biome.

== Conservation ==
The species is listed as Data Deficient because more sampling is needed to collect males and determine its full range as it is still under-sampled.
