= Cheiramiona silvicola =

Forest Long-legged Sac Spider

Conservation status
- Least Concern (SANBI Red List)

Scientific classification
- Kingdom: Animalia
- Phylum: Arthropoda
- Subphylum: Chelicerata
- Class: Arachnida
- Order: Araneae
- Infraorder: Araneomorphae
- Family: Cheiracanthiidae
- Genus: Cheiramiona
- Species: C. silvicola

Binomial name
- Cheiramiona silvicola (Lawrence, 1938)

Species of spider

Cheiramiona silvicola is a species of spider in the family Cheiracanthiidae. It is a South African endemic originally described from Nkandla Forest in KwaZulu-Natal.

The specific name "silvicola" means "forest dwelling" in Latin.

== Distribution ==
The species is known from three provinces and six protected areas at elevations from 20–1783 m above sea level.

== Habitat ==
This species is a free-living plant dweller collected from indigenous forests in the thicket, Indian Ocean coastal belt, Fynbos and savanna biomes. At Ngome State Forest it has also been sampled from commercial pine plantations.

== Conservation ==
Due to its wide geographical range, the species is listed as Least Concern. It is protected in several reserves including Katberg State Forest, Silaka Nature Reserve, Ngome State Forest, Vernon Crookes Nature Reserve and Swartberg Nature Reserve.
