= Cheiramiona upperbyensis =

Kuruman Long-legged Sac Spider

Scientific classification
- Kingdom: Animalia
- Phylum: Arthropoda
- Subphylum: Chelicerata
- Class: Arachnida
- Order: Araneae
- Infraorder: Araneomorphae
- Family: Cheiracanthiidae
- Genus: Cheiramiona
- Species: C. upperbyensis

Binomial name
- Cheiramiona upperbyensis Lotz, 2015

Species of spider

Cheiramiona upperbyensis is a species of spider in the family Cheiracanthiidae. It is a South African Northern Cape endemic described from Kuruman.

== Distribution ==
The species is known only from a single female from the type locality at 1326 m above sea level.

== Habitat ==
This species is a free-living plant dweller sampled from bushes in the Succulent Karoo Biome.

== Conservation ==
The species is listed as Data Deficient because more sampling is needed to collect males and determine its full range.
