= Cheiramiona kentaniensis =

Kentani Long-legged Sac Spider

Conservation status
- Least Concern (SANBI Red List)

Scientific classification
- Kingdom: Animalia
- Phylum: Arthropoda
- Subphylum: Chelicerata
- Class: Arachnida
- Order: Araneae
- Infraorder: Araneomorphae
- Family: Cheiracanthiidae
- Genus: Cheiramiona
- Species: C. kentaniensis

Binomial name
- Cheiramiona kentaniensis Lotz, 2002

Species of spider

Cheiramiona kentaniensis is a species of spider in the family Cheiracanthiidae. It is a South African Eastern Cape endemic described from Kentani.

== Distribution ==
The species is known from several localities at elevations from 23-607 m above sea level.

== Habitat ==
This species is a free-living plant dweller collected by sweeping mixed herbs from the Forest, Indian Ocean Coastal Belt, Savanna and Thicket biomes.

== Conservation ==
Despite having a relatively restricted distribution, this species can survive in transformed habitats and is therefore listed as Least Concern. It is protected in Cwebe Nature Reserve and Silaka Nature Reserve.
