= Cheiramiona lajuma =

Lajuma Long-legged Sac Spider

Conservation status
- Least Concern (SANBI Red List)

Scientific classification
- Kingdom: Animalia
- Phylum: Arthropoda
- Subphylum: Chelicerata
- Class: Arachnida
- Order: Araneae
- Infraorder: Araneomorphae
- Family: Cheiracanthiidae
- Genus: Cheiramiona
- Species: C. lajuma

Binomial name
- Cheiramiona lajuma Lotz, 2002

Species of spider

Cheiramiona lajuma is a species of spider in the family Cheiracanthiidae. It is a South African endemic described from Lhuvhondo Nature Reserve in the Soutpansberg.

== Distribution ==
The species is known from five provinces at elevations from 40-1362 m above sea level.

== Habitat ==
This species is a free-living plant dweller collected from pit traps, leaf litter sifting and sweeping of grass in the Fynbos, Forest, Indian Ocean Coastal Belt, Savanna and Thicket biomes.

== Conservation ==
Due to the wide geographical range, the species is listed as Least Concern. It is protected in the Entabeni Nature Reserve, Lhuvhondo Nature Reserve and Table Mountain National Park.
