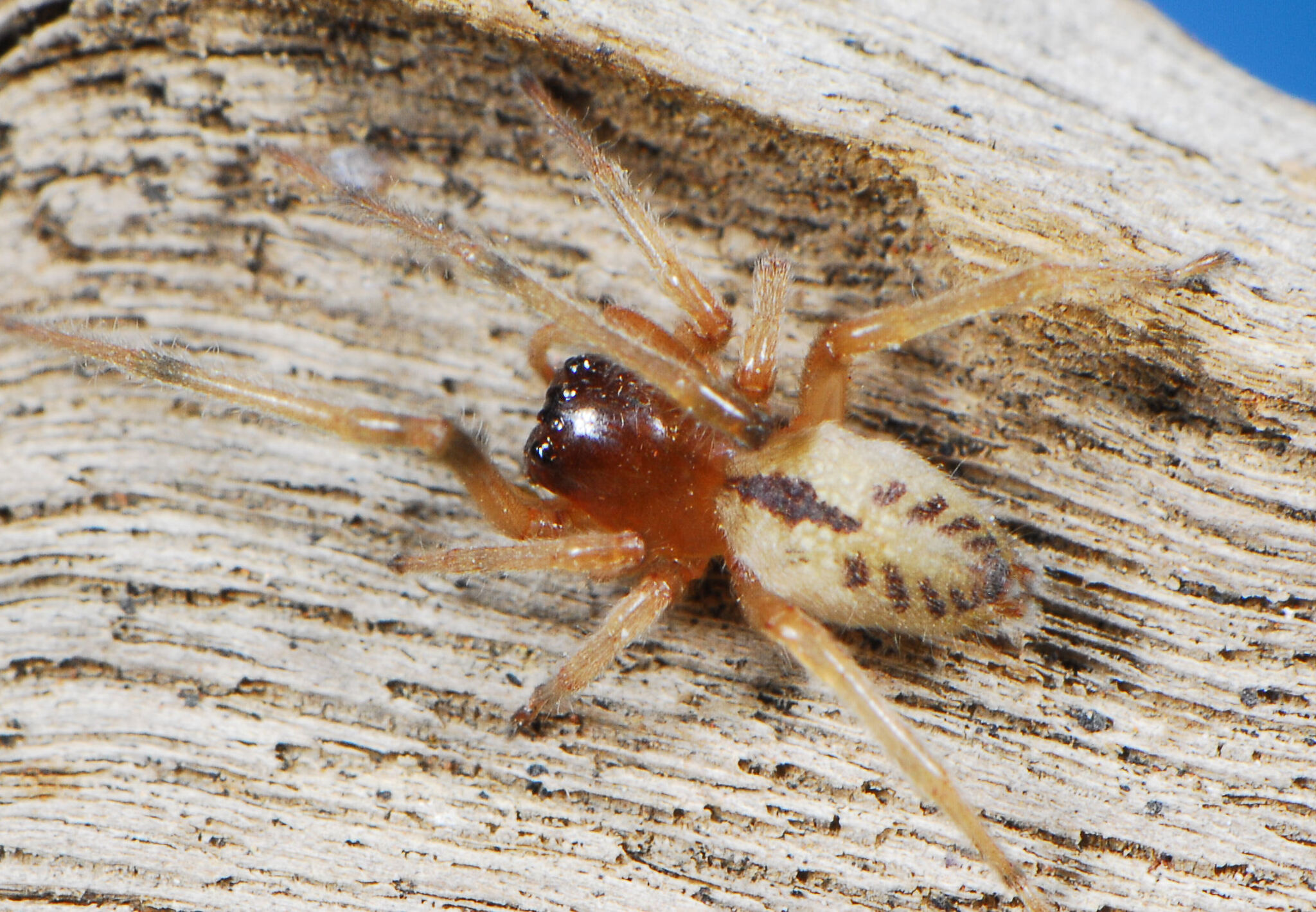
- Female C. clavigera
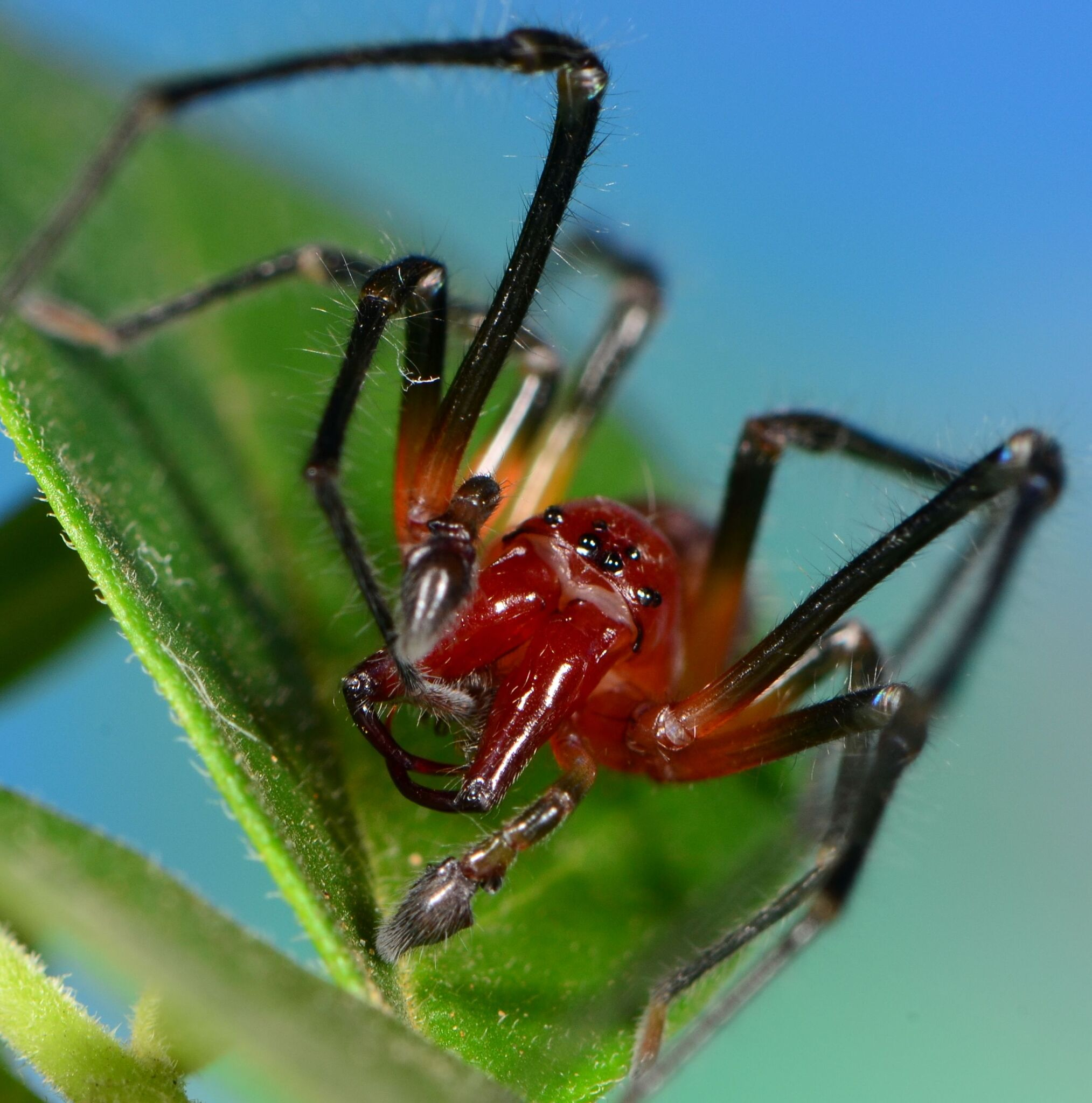
- Male C. krugerensis

Scientific classification
- Kingdom: Animalia
- Phylum: Arthropoda
- Subphylum: Chelicerata
- Class: Arachnida
- Order: Araneae
- Infraorder: Araneomorphae
- Family: Cheiracanthiidae
- Genus: Cheiramiona; Lotz & Dippenaar-Schoeman, 1999

Type species
- C. clavigera (Simon, 1897)

Species
- See text

= Cheiramiona =

Genus of spiders

Cheiramiona is a genus of sac spiders in the family Cheiracanthiidae. The genus was described by Lotz & Dippenaar-Schoeman in 1999. It is an African genus with 50 known species, of which 35 have been recorded from South Africa.

== Common name ==
Cheiramiona species are commonly known as long-legged sac spiders.

== Distribution ==
Spiders in this genus are mostly found in Southern Africa, with few reaching as far north as Egypt.

== Description ==
Cheiramiona are medium-sized spiders, with females measuring approximately 6.28 mm and males 5.18 mm in total length. Males and females are very similar in appearance, though males are more slender with slightly longer legs.

The cephalothorax and legs are yellow to orange in color, sometimes darker in the eye region, with distinct to indistinct markings on the opisthosoma and legs. The coloration is more distinct in live specimens but fades to an overall pale yellow in specimens preserved for extended periods in alcohol.

The carapace is sub-ovoid and highest in the cephalic region. The fovea is inconspicuous to absent. Eyes are arranged in two transverse rows. In males, the chelicerae are sometimes well developed with long fangs.

The abdomen is elongate-oval and covered with soft hairs. A distinct heart-mark is present. The apical segment of the posterior spinnerets is conical. The legs are relatively long, with leg I longer than leg IV.

== Habitat and behavior ==
Cheiramiona species are free-living plant dwellers that construct silk retreats in rolled-up leaves. They are found across various habitats throughout Africa, with the highest diversity in South Africa.

== Taxonomy ==
The genus was originally described by Lotz & Dippenaar-Schoeman in 1999. The first species were revised by Lotz in 2002, and additional new species were described by Lotz in 2015.

Originally placed in the family Miturgidae, Cheiramiona was transferred to the Eutichuridae (now Cheiracanthiidae) by Ramírez in 2014.

C. clavigera was originally described by Eugène Simon in 1897, C. dubia by O. Pickard-Cambridge in 1874.

== Species ==
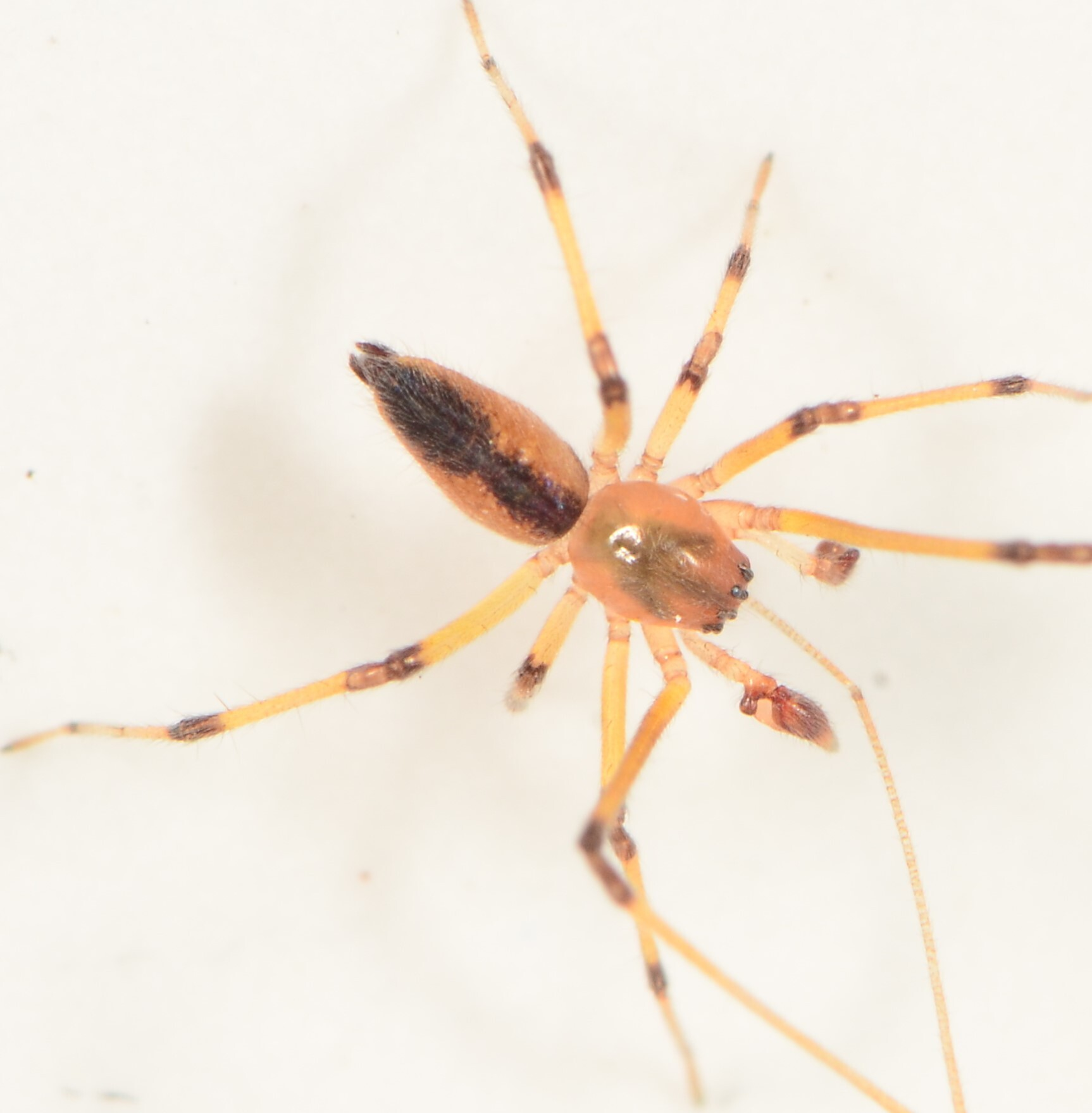
male C. clavigera

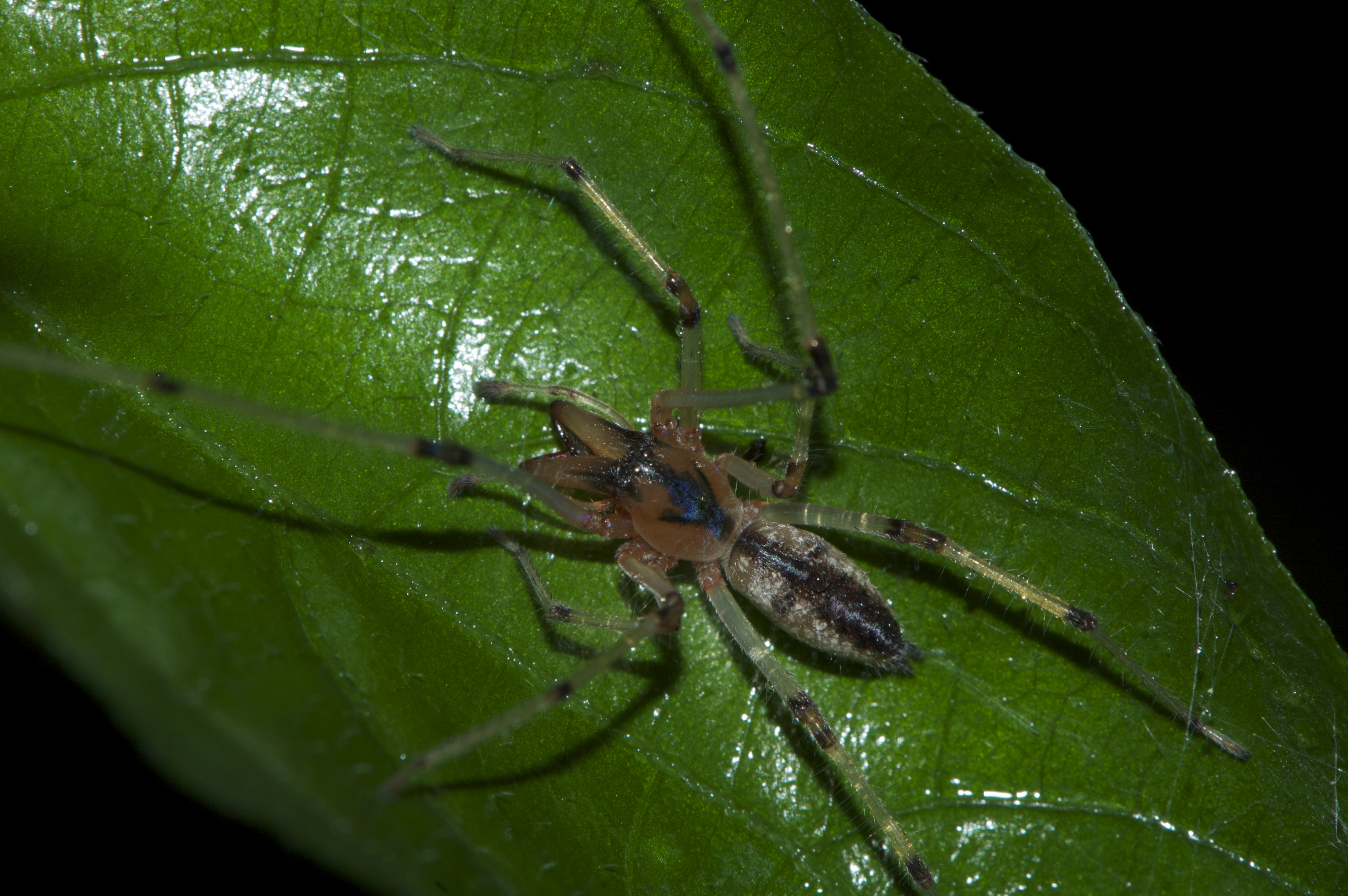
C. debeeri

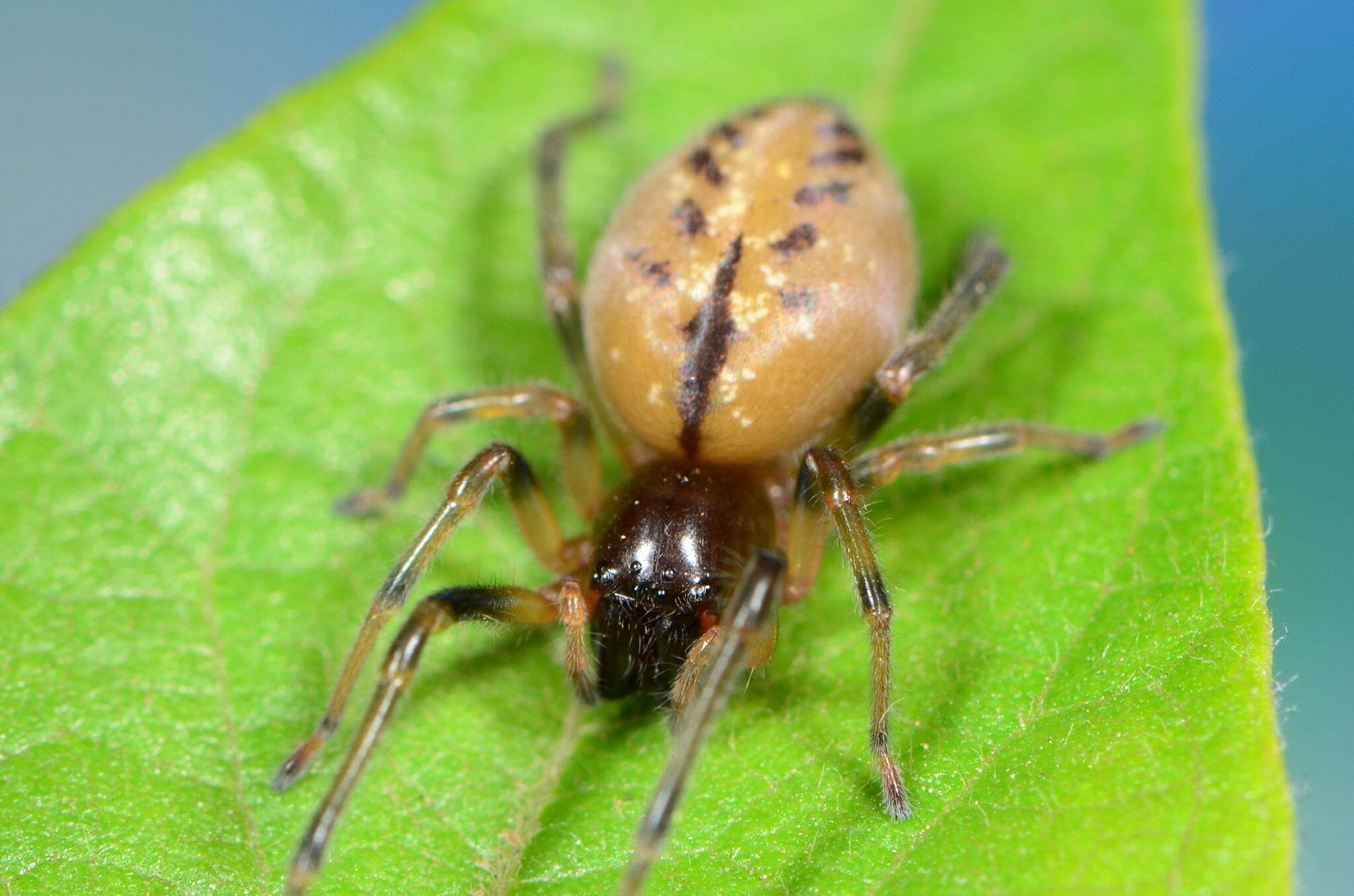
female C. florisbadensis

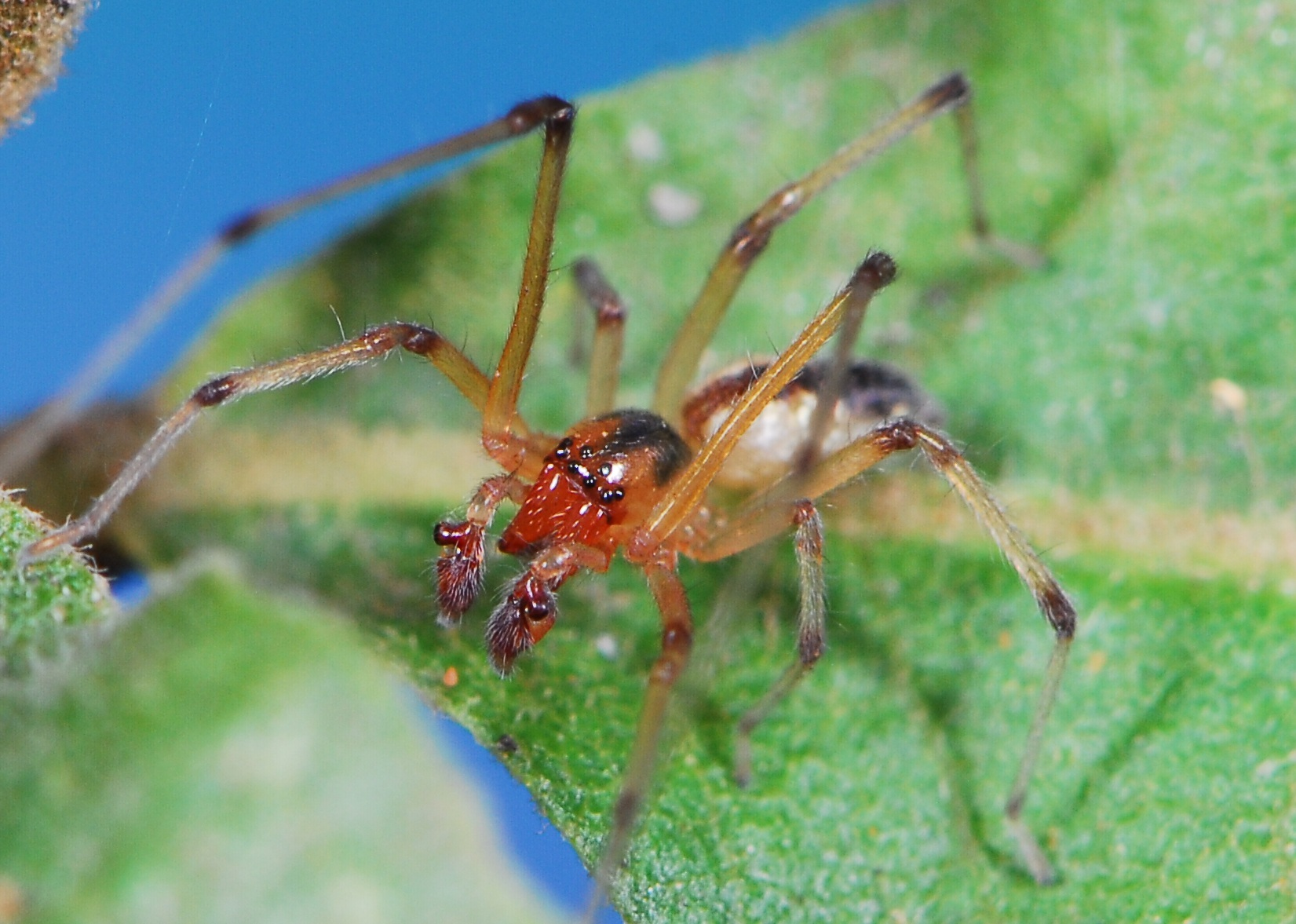
female C. paradisus

As of October 2025, this genus includes fifty species:

- Cheiramiona akermani (Lawrence, 1942) – South Africa
- Cheiramiona amarifontis Lotz, 2003 – South Africa
- Cheiramiona ansiae Lotz, 2003 – South Africa
- Cheiramiona baviaan Lotz, 2015 – South Africa
- Cheiramiona boschrandensis Lotz, 2015 – South Africa
- Cheiramiona brandbergensis Lotz, 2005 – Namibia
- Cheiramiona clavigera (Simon, 1897) – South Africa (type species)
- Cheiramiona collinita (Lawrence, 1938) – South Africa
- Cheiramiona debeeri Lotz, 2015 – South Africa
- Cheiramiona dubia (O. Pickard-Cambridge, 1874) – Egypt
- Cheiramiona ferrumfontis Lotz, 2003 – South Africa
- Cheiramiona filipes (Simon, 1898) – Zimbabwe, Mozambique, South Africa
- Cheiramiona florisbadensis Lotz, 2003 – South Africa, Lesotho
- Cheiramiona fontanus Lotz, 2003 – South Africa
- Cheiramiona haddadi Lotz, 2015 – South Africa
- Cheiramiona hewitti (Lessert, 1921) – Tanzania
- Cheiramiona hlathikulu Lotz, 2015 – South Africa
- Cheiramiona hogsbackensis Lotz, 2015 – South Africa
- Cheiramiona ibayaensis Lotz, 2015 – Tanzania
- Cheiramiona jakobsbaaiensis Lotz, 2015 – South Africa
- Cheiramiona jocquei Lotz, 2003 – Malawi
- Cheiramiona kalongensis Lotz, 2003 – DR Congo
- Cheiramiona kentaniensis Lotz, 2003 – South Africa
- Cheiramiona kirkspriggsi Lotz, 2015 – South Africa
- Cheiramiona kivuensis Lotz, 2015 – Congo, Rwanda
- Cheiramiona krugerensis Lotz, 2003 – South Africa
- Cheiramiona lajuma Lotz, 2003 – South Africa
- Cheiramiona lamorali Lotz, 2015 – Namibia
- Cheiramiona langi Lotz, 2003 – Zimbabwe, South Africa
- Cheiramiona lejeunei Lotz, 2003 – Congo, Malawi
- Cheiramiona lindae Lotz, 2015 – South Africa
- Cheiramiona malawiensis Lotz, 2015 – Malawi
- Cheiramiona mkhambathi Lotz, 2015 – South Africa
- Cheiramiona mlawula Lotz, 2003 – Eswatini, South Africa
- Cheiramiona mohalensis Lotz, 2015 – Lesotho
- Cheiramiona musosaensis Lotz, 2015 – Congo
- Cheiramiona muvalensis Lotz, 2003 – Congo
- Cheiramiona nyungwensis Lotz, 2015 – Rwanda
- Cheiramiona paradisus Lotz, 2003 – Zimbabwe, Mozambique, South Africa
- Cheiramiona plaatbosensis Lotz, 2015 – South Africa
- Cheiramiona qachasneki Lotz, 2015 – South Africa
- Cheiramiona regis Lotz, 2003 – South Africa
- Cheiramiona robinae Lotz, 2015 – South Africa
- Cheiramiona ruwenzoricola (Strand, 1916) – Congo
- Cheiramiona saniensis Lotz, 2015 – South Africa
- Cheiramiona silvicola (Lawrence, 1938) – South Africa
- Cheiramiona simplicitarsis (Simon, 1910) – South Africa
- Cheiramiona stellenboschiensis Lotz, 2003 – South Africa
- Cheiramiona tembensis Lotz, 2015 – South Africa
- Cheiramiona upperbyensis Lotz, 2015 – South Africa
