= Cheiramiona hogsbackensis =

Hogsback Long-legged Sac Spider

Conservation status
- Critically endangered (SANBI Red List)

Scientific classification
- Kingdom: Animalia
- Phylum: Arthropoda
- Subphylum: Chelicerata
- Class: Arachnida
- Order: Araneae
- Infraorder: Araneomorphae
- Family: Cheiracanthiidae
- Genus: Cheiramiona
- Species: C. hogsbackensis

Binomial name
- Cheiramiona hogsbackensis Lotz, 2015

Species of spider

Cheiramiona hogsbackensis is a species of spider in the family Cheiracanthiidae. It is a South African Eastern Cape endemic described from specimens sampled at Hogsback.

== Distribution ==
The species is found at elevations from 1307–1345 m above sea level.

== Habitat ==
This species is a free-living plant dweller sampled at base of grass tussocks and in leaf litter from forests and plantations in the Forest Biome.

== Conservation ==
The species is listed as Critically Rare because it has a small restricted distribution range and is only known from one subpopulation. Despite extensive sampling at the type locality over the years, only a few specimens have been collected, indicating the species is naturally rare.
