= Cheiramiona filipes =

Zululand Long-legged Sac Spider

Conservation status
- Least Concern (SANBI Red List)

Scientific classification
- Kingdom: Animalia
- Phylum: Arthropoda
- Subphylum: Chelicerata
- Class: Arachnida
- Order: Araneae
- Infraorder: Araneomorphae
- Family: Cheiracanthiidae
- Genus: Cheiramiona
- Species: C. filipes

Binomial name
- Cheiramiona filipes (Simon, 1898)

Species of spider

Cheiramiona filipes is a species of spider in the family Cheiracanthiidae. It is a southern African endemic originally described from KwaZulu-Natal and is known from three African countries.

== Distribution ==
In South Africa, the species is known from three provinces at elevations from 1-1362 m above sea level.

== Habitat ==
This species is a free-living plant dweller collected by sweeping and beating grass. It has been sampled from the Forest, Grassland, Indian Ocean Coastal Belt and Savanna biomes.

== Conservation ==
Due to its wide geographical range, the species is listed as Least Concern. It is protected in ten protected areas.
