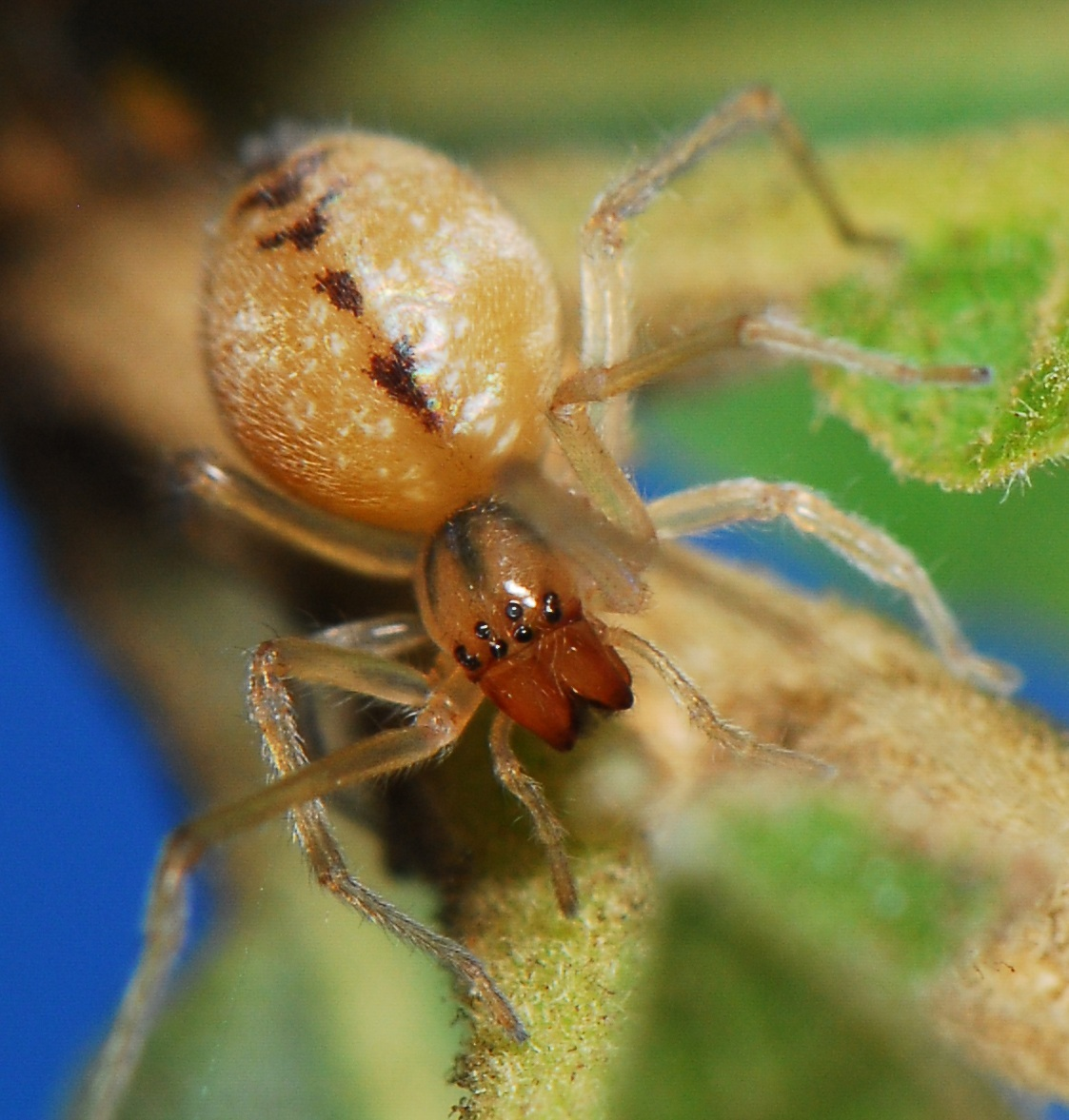
- Female
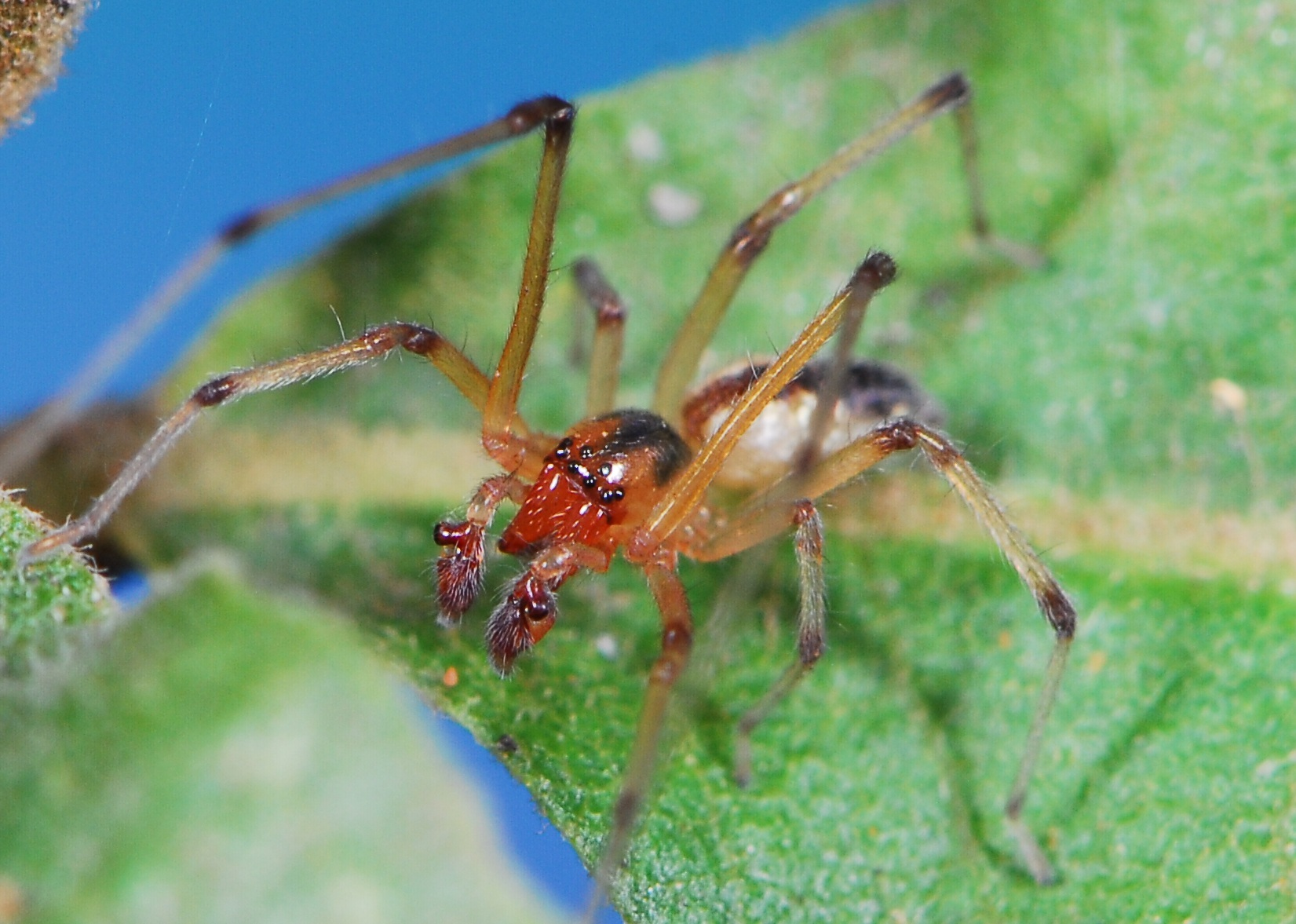
- Male

Scientific classification
- Kingdom: Animalia
- Phylum: Arthropoda
- Subphylum: Chelicerata
- Class: Arachnida
- Order: Araneae
- Infraorder: Araneomorphae
- Family: Cheiracanthiidae
- Genus: Cheiramiona
- Species: C. paradisus

Binomial name
- Cheiramiona paradisus Lotz, 2002

= Cheiramiona paradisus =

Long-legged Sac Spider

Species of spider

Cheiramiona paradisus is a species of spider in the family Cheiracanthiidae. It is a southern African endemic described from Paradise, Ngotshe in KwaZulu-Natal.

== Distribution ==
The species is recorded from six provinces in South Africa at elevations from 5-1362 m above sea level.

== Habitat ==
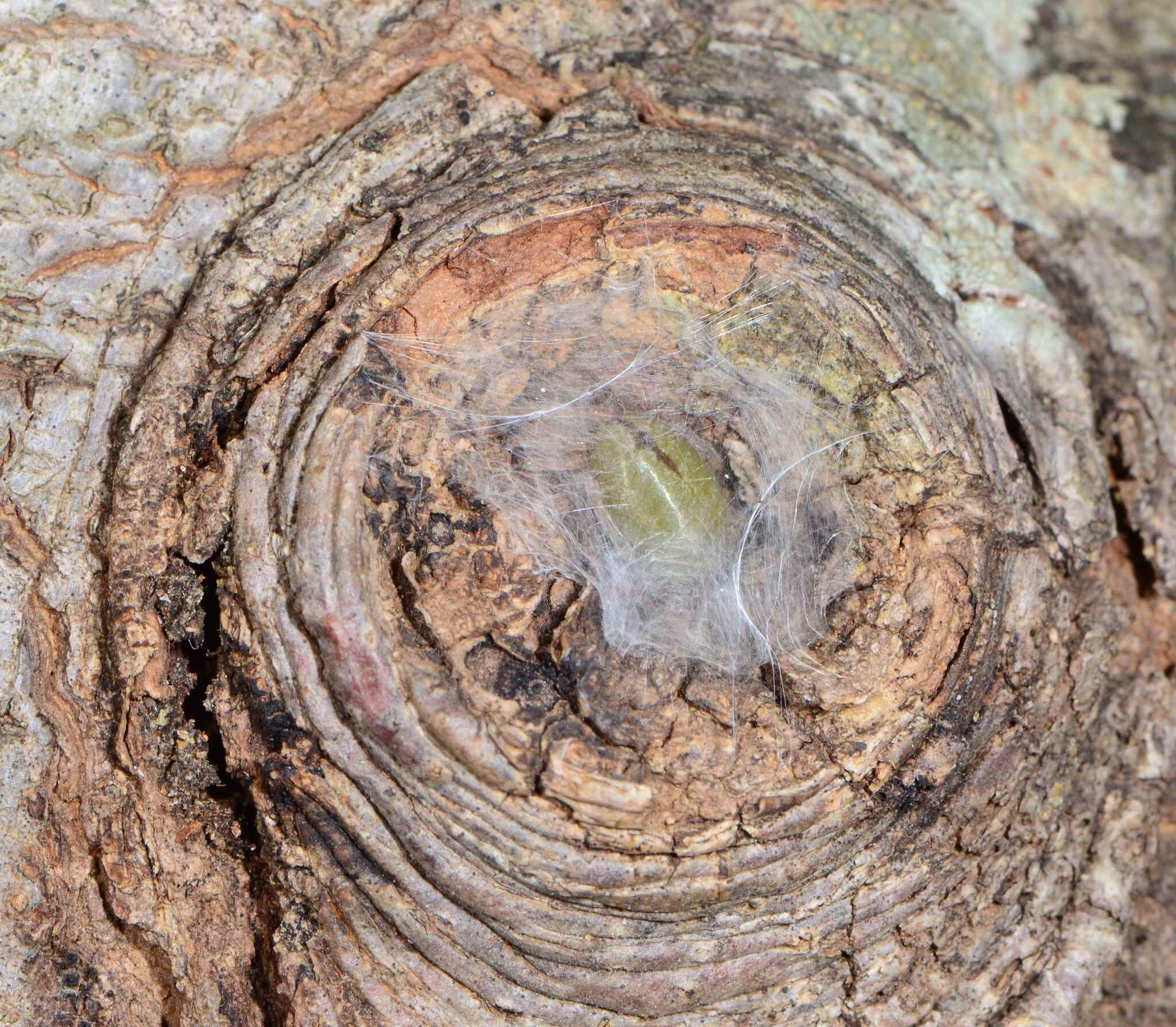
female in web

This species is a free-living plant dweller sampled from a wide range of habitats. It has been sampled from the Fynbos, Forest, Grassland, Indian Ocean Coastal Belt, Savanna and Thicket biomes. The species has also been found in macadamia orchards.

== Conservation ==
Due to its wide geographical range, the species is listed as Least Concern. It is protected in more than 10 protected areas.

== Description ==
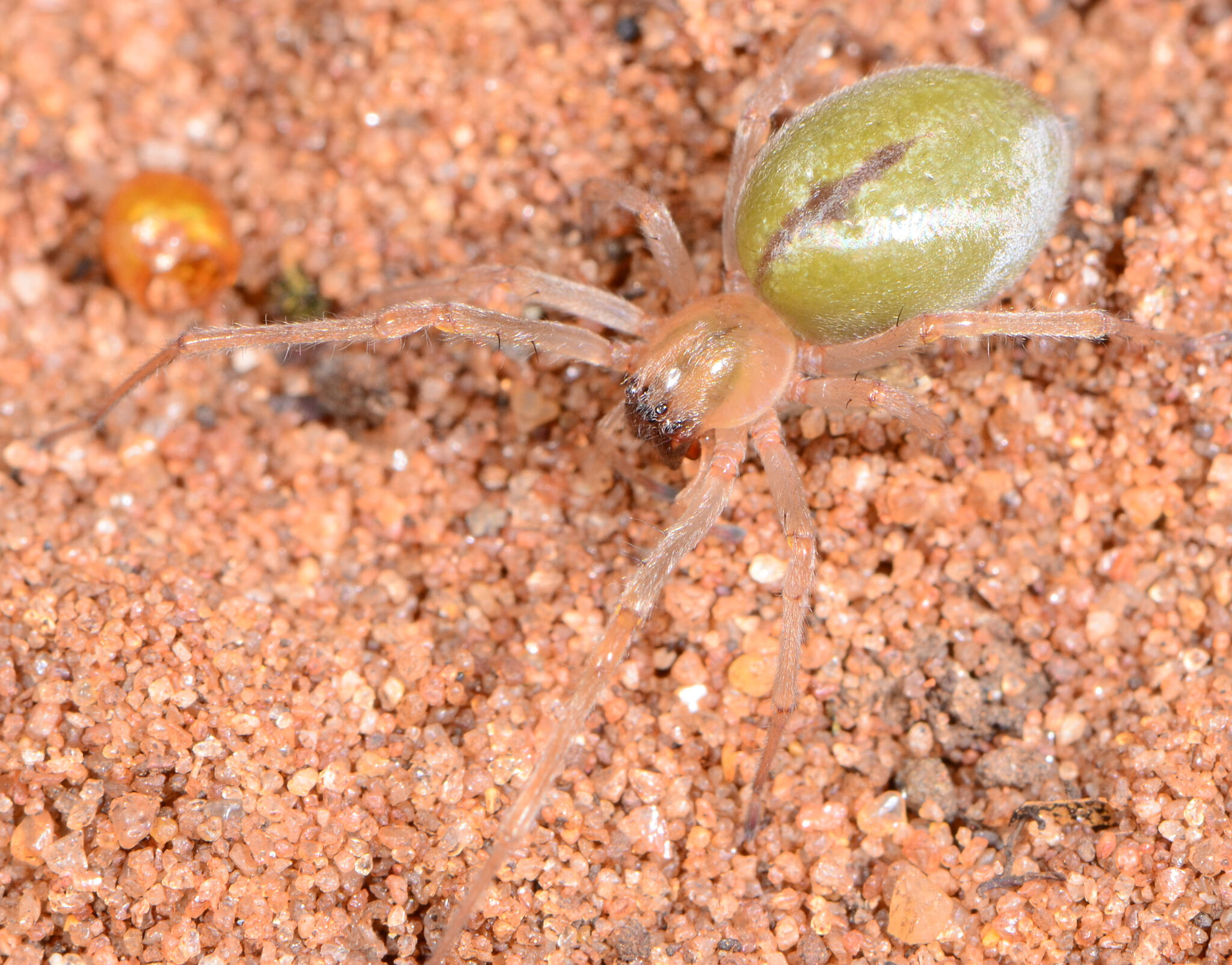
female

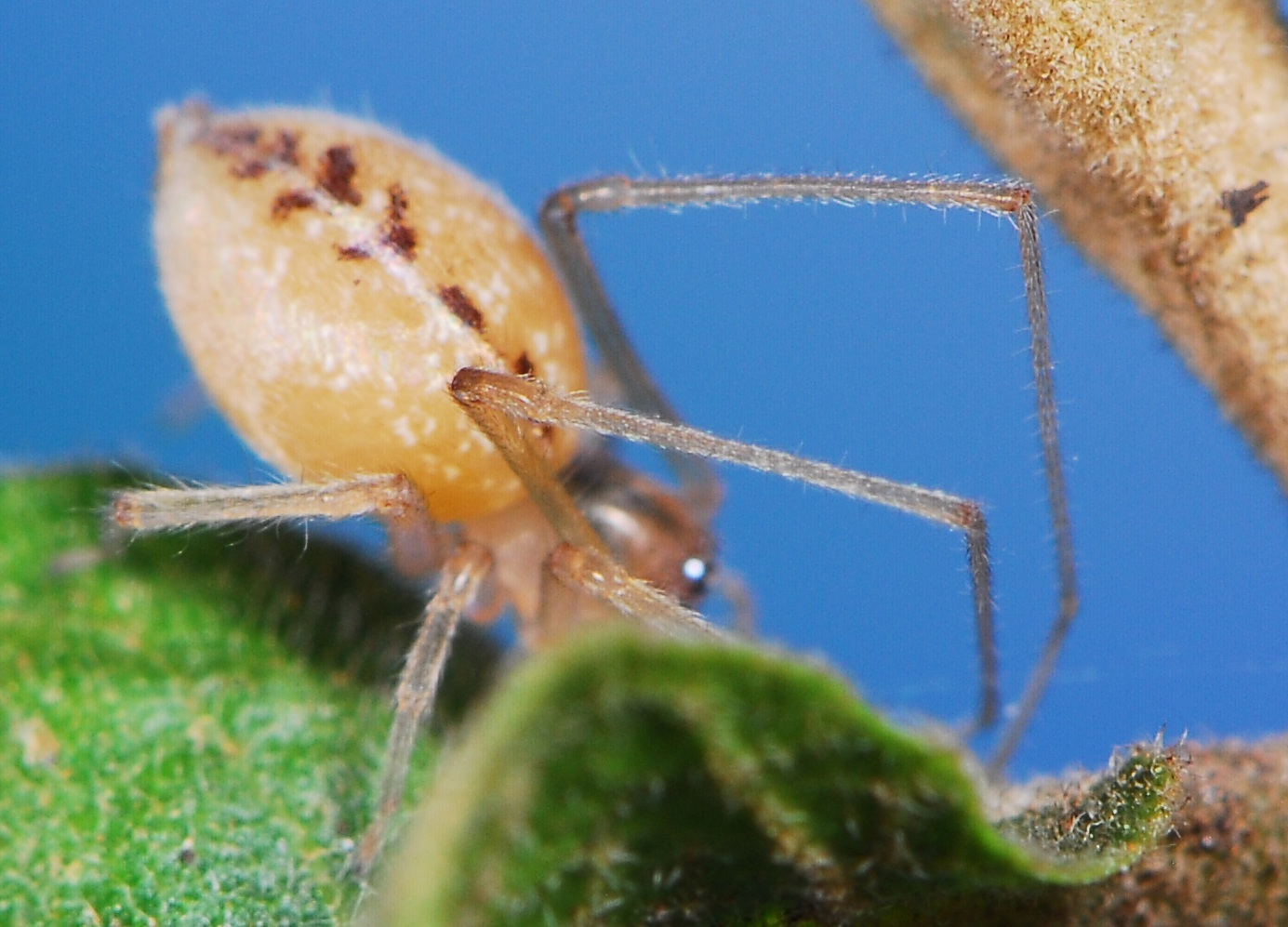
female

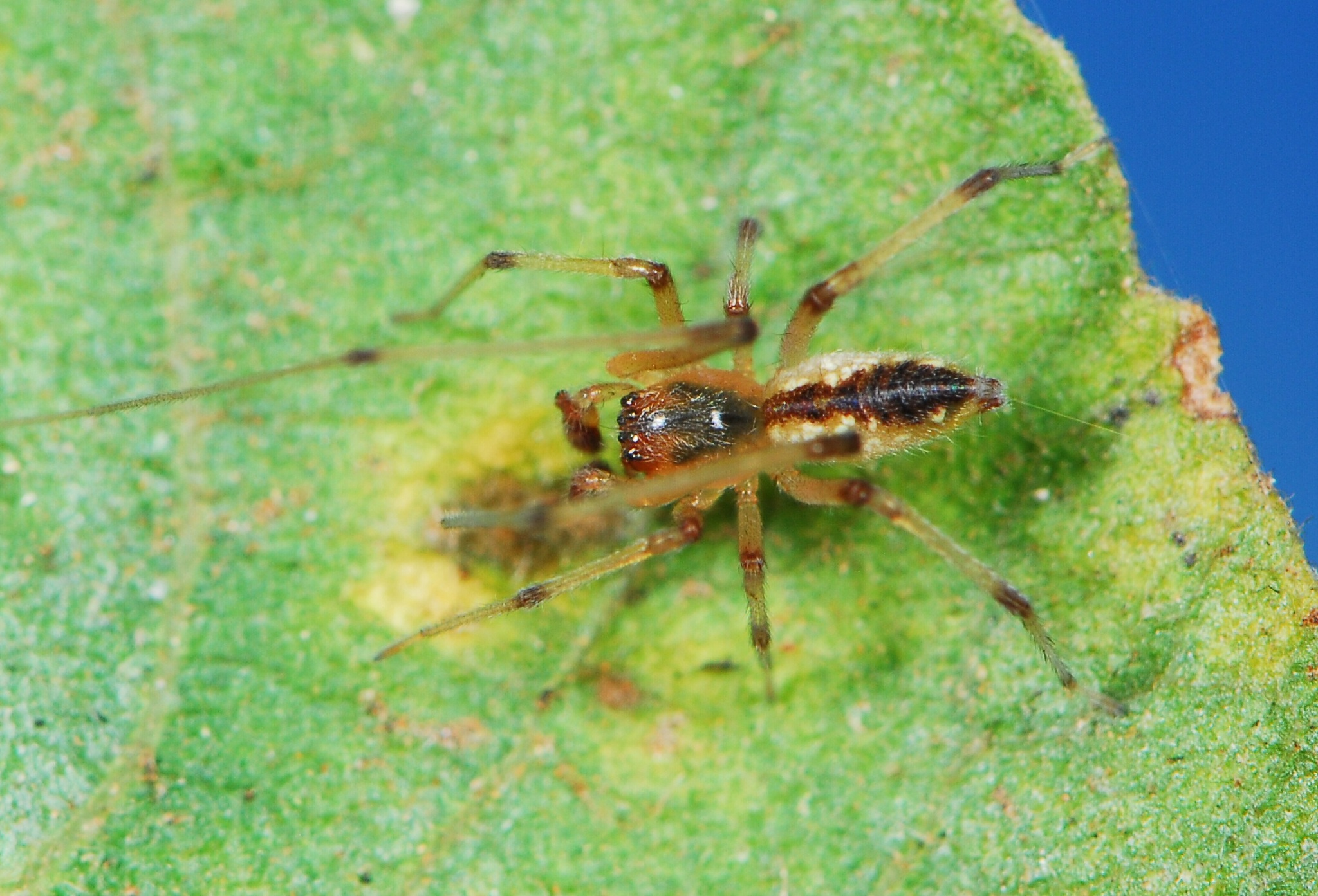
male

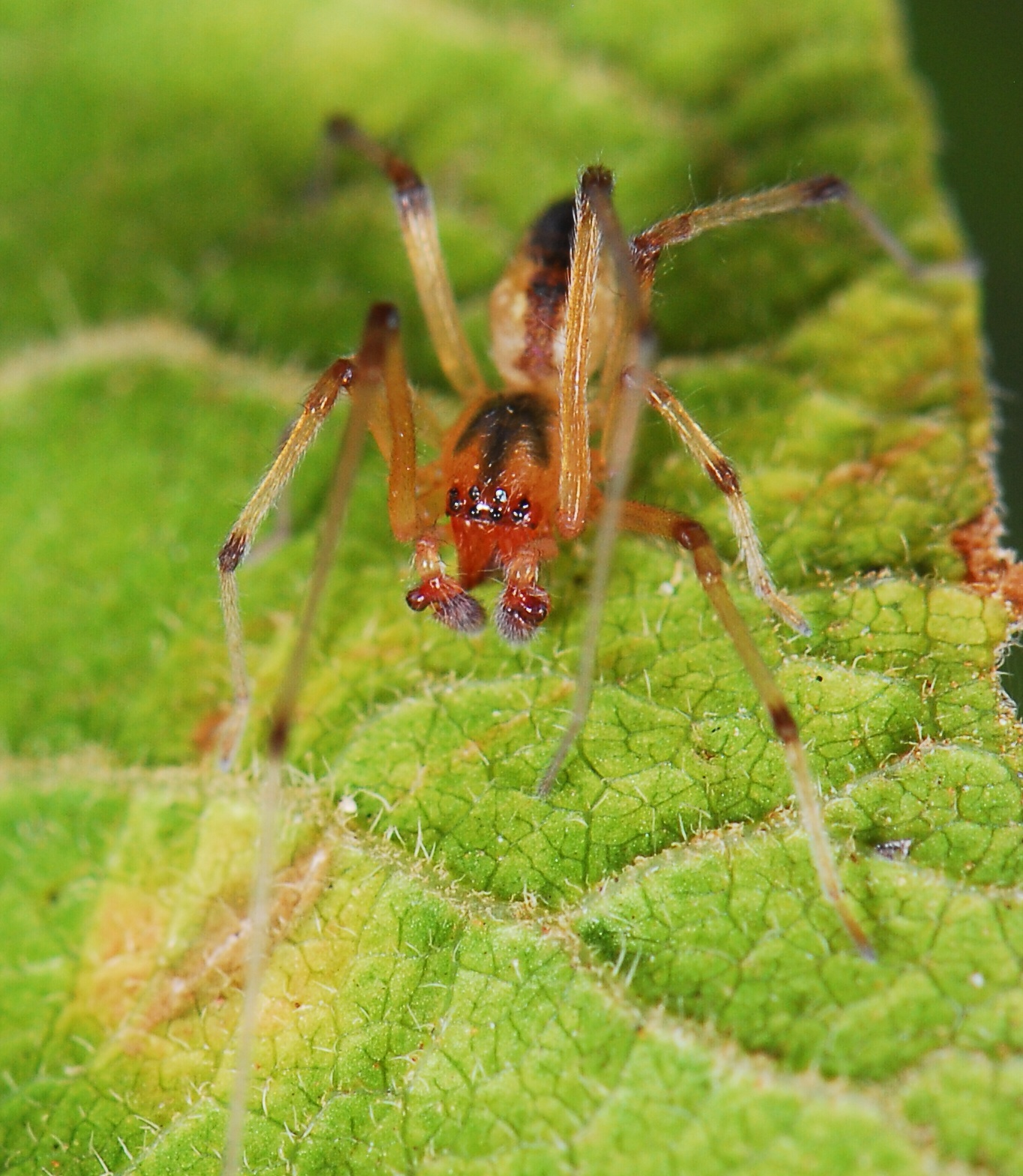
male
