= Cheiramiona jakobsbaaiensis =

Jacobsbaai Long-legged Sac spider

Scientific classification
- Kingdom: Animalia
- Phylum: Arthropoda
- Subphylum: Chelicerata
- Class: Arachnida
- Order: Araneae
- Infraorder: Araneomorphae
- Family: Cheiracanthiidae
- Genus: Cheiramiona
- Species: C. jakobsbaaiensis

Binomial name
- Cheiramiona jakobsbaaiensis Lotz, 2015

Species of spider

Cheiramiona jakobsbaaiensis is a species of spider in the family Cheiracanthiidae. It is a South African Western Cape endemic described from Jacobsbaai.

== Distribution ==
The species is found at 26 m above sea level.

== Habitat ==
This species is a free-living plant dweller collected from leaf litter in the Fynbos Biome.

== Conservation ==
The species is listed as Data Deficient because more sampling is needed to collect females and determine its full range.
