= Cheiramiona ansiae =

Ansie's Long-legged Sac Spider

Conservation status
- Least Concern (SANBI Red List)

Scientific classification
- Kingdom: Animalia
- Phylum: Arthropoda
- Subphylum: Chelicerata
- Class: Arachnida
- Order: Araneae
- Infraorder: Araneomorphae
- Family: Cheiracanthiidae
- Genus: Cheiramiona
- Species: C. ansiae

Binomial name
- Cheiramiona ansiae Lotz, 2002

Species of spider

Cheiramiona ansiae is a species of spider in the family Cheiracanthiidae. It is a South African endemic described from Ceres near Touws River in the Western Cape.

== Distribution ==
The species is known from two provinces, including ten protected areas, at elevations from 17–1333 m above sea level.

== Habitat ==
This species is a free-living plant dweller frequently sampled with pitfall traps from the humus layer and on mixed vegetation in the Fynbos and Thicket biomes.

== Conservation ==
Due to the wide geographical range, the species is listed as Least Concern. It is protected in numerous areas including Addo Elephant National Park, Anysberg Nature Reserve, Bontebok National Park, and Table Mountain National Park.
