= Cheiramiona mlawula =

Eswatini Long-legged Sac Spider

Conservation status
- Least Concern (SANBI Red List)

Scientific classification
- Kingdom: Animalia
- Phylum: Arthropoda
- Subphylum: Chelicerata
- Class: Arachnida
- Order: Araneae
- Infraorder: Araneomorphae
- Family: Cheiracanthiidae
- Genus: Cheiramiona
- Species: C. mlawula

Binomial name
- Cheiramiona mlawula Lotz, 2002

Species of spider

Cheiramiona mlawula is a species of spider in the family Cheiracanthiidae. It is a southern African endemic described from Eswatini.

== Distribution ==
In South Africa, the species is known from two provinces at elevations from 20-1284 m above sea level.

== Habitat ==
This species is a free-living plant dweller collected by sweeping grass and beating low forest vegetation. It has been sampled from the Forest, Indian Ocean Coastal Belt, Grassland and Savanna biomes.

== Conservation ==
Due to its wide geographic range, the species is listed as Least Concern. It is protected in several reserves including Hluhluwe Nature Reserve, Ndumo Game Reserve, Sodwana Bay National Park, Tembe Elephant Park and Lhuvhondo Nature Reserve.
