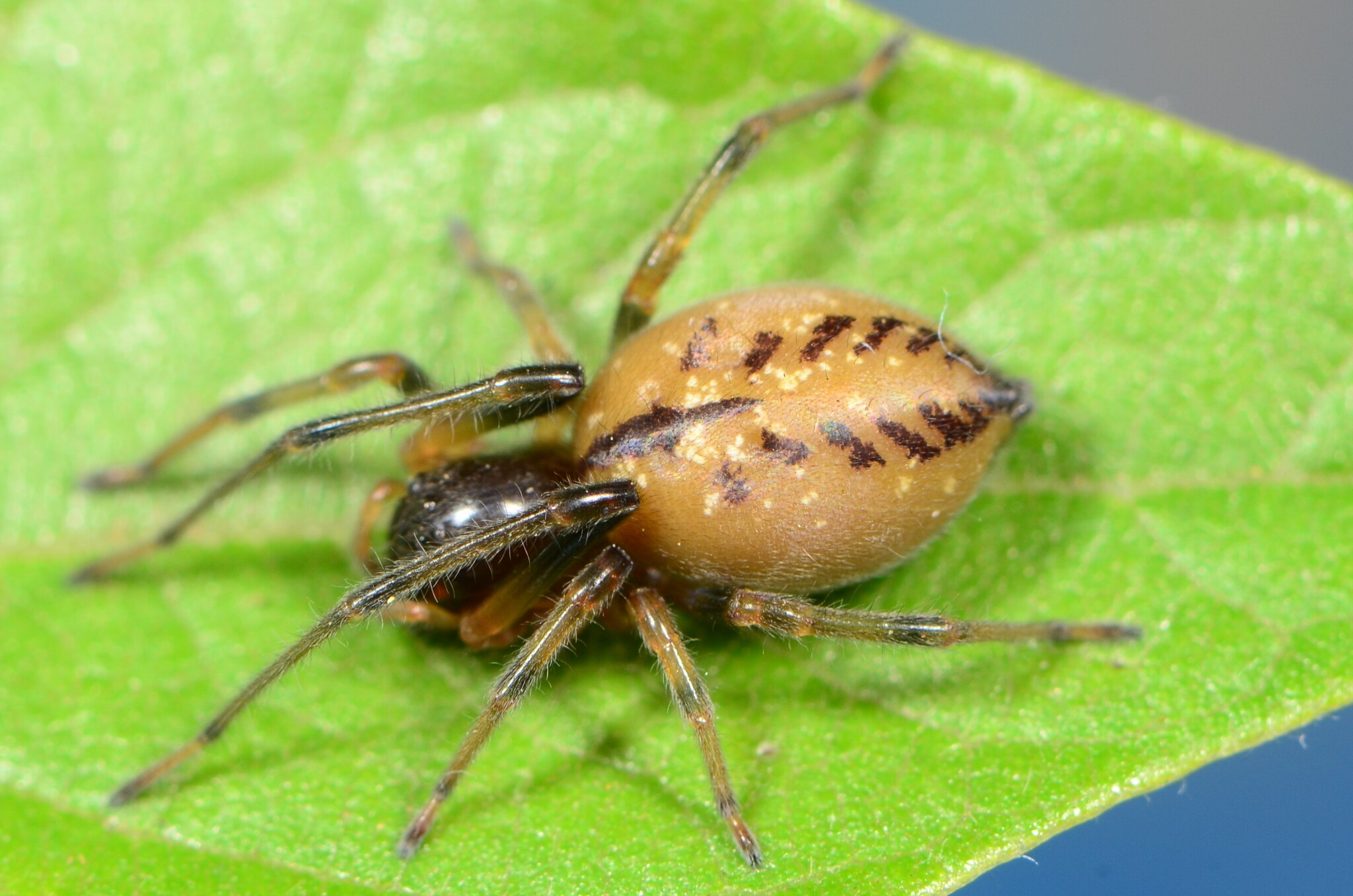
- Female
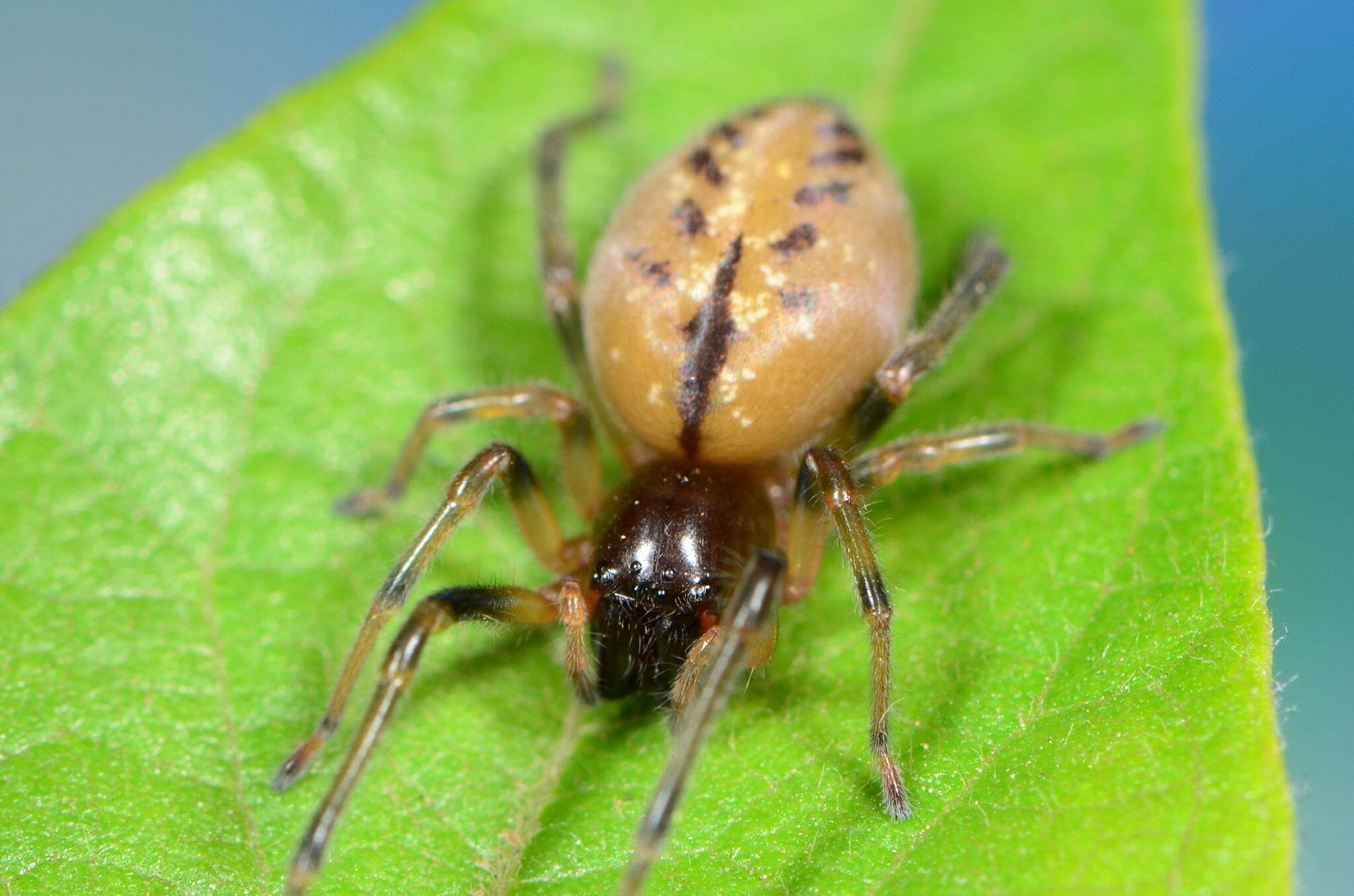
- Female

Scientific classification
- Kingdom: Animalia
- Phylum: Arthropoda
- Subphylum: Chelicerata
- Class: Arachnida
- Order: Araneae
- Infraorder: Araneomorphae
- Family: Cheiracanthiidae
- Genus: Cheiramiona
- Species: C. florisbadensis

Binomial name
- Cheiramiona florisbadensis Lotz, 2002

= Cheiramiona florisbadensis =

Florisbad Long-legged Sac Spider

Species of spider

Cheiramiona florisbadensis is a species of spider in the family Cheiracanthiidae. It is a South African endemic described from Florisbad in the Free State.

== Distribution ==
In South Africa, the species is known from five provinces at elevations from 7–2399 m above sea level.

== Habitat ==
This species is a free-living plant dweller sampled from shrubs and forests. It has been sampled from the Fynbos, Forest, Grassland, Nama Karoo and Savanna biomes.

== Conservation ==
Due to its wide geographical range, it is listed as Least Concern. The species is protected in Erfenis Dam Nature Reserve, Loteni Nature Reserve, Vernon Crookes Nature Reserve and Fernkloof Nature Reserve.
