= Cheiramiona hlathikulu =

Estcourt Long-legged Spider

Scientific classification
- Kingdom: Animalia
- Phylum: Arthropoda
- Subphylum: Chelicerata
- Class: Arachnida
- Order: Araneae
- Infraorder: Araneomorphae
- Family: Cheiracanthiidae
- Genus: Cheiramiona
- Species: C. hlathikulu

Binomial name
- Cheiramiona hlathikulu Lotz, 2015

Species of spider

Cheiramiona hlathikulu is a species of spider in the family Cheiracanthiidae. It is a South African KwaZulu-Natal endemic known only from the type locality Hlathikulu forest near Estcourt.

== Distribution ==
The species is found at 418 m above sea level.

== Habitat ==
This species is a free-living plant dweller collected at the base of grass tussocks in a forest-grassland ecotone in the Savanna Biome.

== Conservation ==
The species is listed as Data Deficient because more sampling is needed to collect females and determine its full range.
