= Cheiramiona stellenboschiensis =

Stellenbosch Long-legged Sac Spider

Scientific classification
- Kingdom: Animalia
- Phylum: Arthropoda
- Subphylum: Chelicerata
- Class: Arachnida
- Order: Araneae
- Infraorder: Araneomorphae
- Family: Cheiracanthiidae
- Genus: Cheiramiona
- Species: C. stellenboschiensis

Binomial name
- Cheiramiona stellenboschiensis Lotz, 2002

Species of spider

Cheiramiona stellenboschiensis is a species of spider in the family Cheiracanthiidae. It is a South African Western Cape endemic described from Stellenbosch.

== Distribution ==
The species has a restricted distribution at elevations from 96-143 m above sea level.

== Habitat ==
This species is a free-living plant dweller sampled from Renosterveld in the Fynbos Biome.

== Conservation ==
The species is listed as Data Deficient because more sampling is needed to collect females and determine its full range.
