= Cheiramiona langi =

Soutpan Long-legged Sac Spider

Scientific classification
- Kingdom: Animalia
- Phylum: Arthropoda
- Subphylum: Chelicerata
- Class: Arachnida
- Order: Araneae
- Infraorder: Araneomorphae
- Family: Cheiracanthiidae
- Genus: Cheiramiona
- Species: C. langi

Binomial name
- Cheiramiona langi Lotz, 2002

Species of spider

Cheiramiona langi is a species of spider in the family Cheiracanthiidae. It is a southern African endemic described from Saltpan in the Soutpansberg.

== Distribution ==
The species is known from South Africa and Zimbabwe, but only from single specimens sampled prior to 1991, at 739 m above sea level in South Africa.

== Habitat ==
This species is a free-living plant dweller sampled from the Savanna Biome.

== Conservation ==
The species is listed as Data Deficient because more sampling is needed to collect females and determine its full range.
