= Cheiramiona mkhambathi =

Mkhambathi Long-legged Sac spider

Scientific classification
- Kingdom: Animalia
- Phylum: Arthropoda
- Subphylum: Chelicerata
- Class: Arachnida
- Order: Araneae
- Infraorder: Araneomorphae
- Family: Cheiracanthiidae
- Genus: Cheiramiona
- Species: C. mkhambathi

Binomial name
- Cheiramiona mkhambathi Lotz, 2015

Species of spider

Cheiramiona mkhambathi is a species of spider in the family Cheiracanthiidae. It is a South African Eastern Cape endemic described from Mkhambathi Nature Reserve.

== Distribution ==
The species is found at 64 m above sea level.

== Habitat ==
This species is a free-living plant dweller. Specimens were collected with pan traps in grassland. It has been sampled from the Indian Ocean Coastal Biome.

== Conservation ==
The species is listed as Data Deficient because more sampling is needed to determine its full range. It is presently protected in Mkhambathi Nature Reserve.
