= Cheiramiona fontanus =

Brandfort Long-legged Sac Spider

Scientific classification
- Kingdom: Animalia
- Phylum: Arthropoda
- Subphylum: Chelicerata
- Class: Arachnida
- Order: Araneae
- Infraorder: Araneomorphae
- Family: Cheiracanthiidae
- Genus: Cheiramiona
- Species: C. fontanus

Binomial name
- Cheiramiona fontanus Lotz, 2002

Species of spider

Cheiramiona fontanus is a species of spider in the family Cheiracanthiidae. It is a South African endemic described from a well-surveyed area at Florisbad, Brandfort in Free State province.

== Distribution ==
The species is found at 1399 m above sea level.

== Habitat ==
This species is a free-living plant dweller collected with pitfall traps in an area with Karoo-like bushes with no grass in between. It has been sampled from the Grassland Biome.

== Conservation ==
The species is listed as Data Deficient because more sampling is needed to collect females and determine its full range.
