= Cheiramiona ferrumfontis =

Yzerfontein Long-legged Sac Spider

Conservation status
- Least Concern (SANBI Red List)

Scientific classification
- Kingdom: Animalia
- Phylum: Arthropoda
- Subphylum: Chelicerata
- Class: Arachnida
- Order: Araneae
- Infraorder: Araneomorphae
- Family: Cheiracanthiidae
- Genus: Cheiramiona
- Species: C. ferrumfontis

Binomial name
- Cheiramiona ferrumfontis Lotz, 2002

Species of spider

Cheiramiona ferrumfontis is a species of spider in the family Cheiracanthiidae. It is a South African endemic described from Yzerfontein.

== Distribution ==
The species is known from two provinces at elevations from 7–1071 m above sea level.

== Habitat ==
This species is a free-living plant dweller that was collected from under plants, in pitfall traps and on wild herbs. It has been sampled from the Desert, Succulent Karoo and Fynbos biomes.

== Conservation ==
Due to its wide geographical range, it is listed as Least Concern. The species is protected in three protected areas: Richtersveld Transfrontier National Park, Augrabies National Park and Jacobs Bay Nature Reserve.
