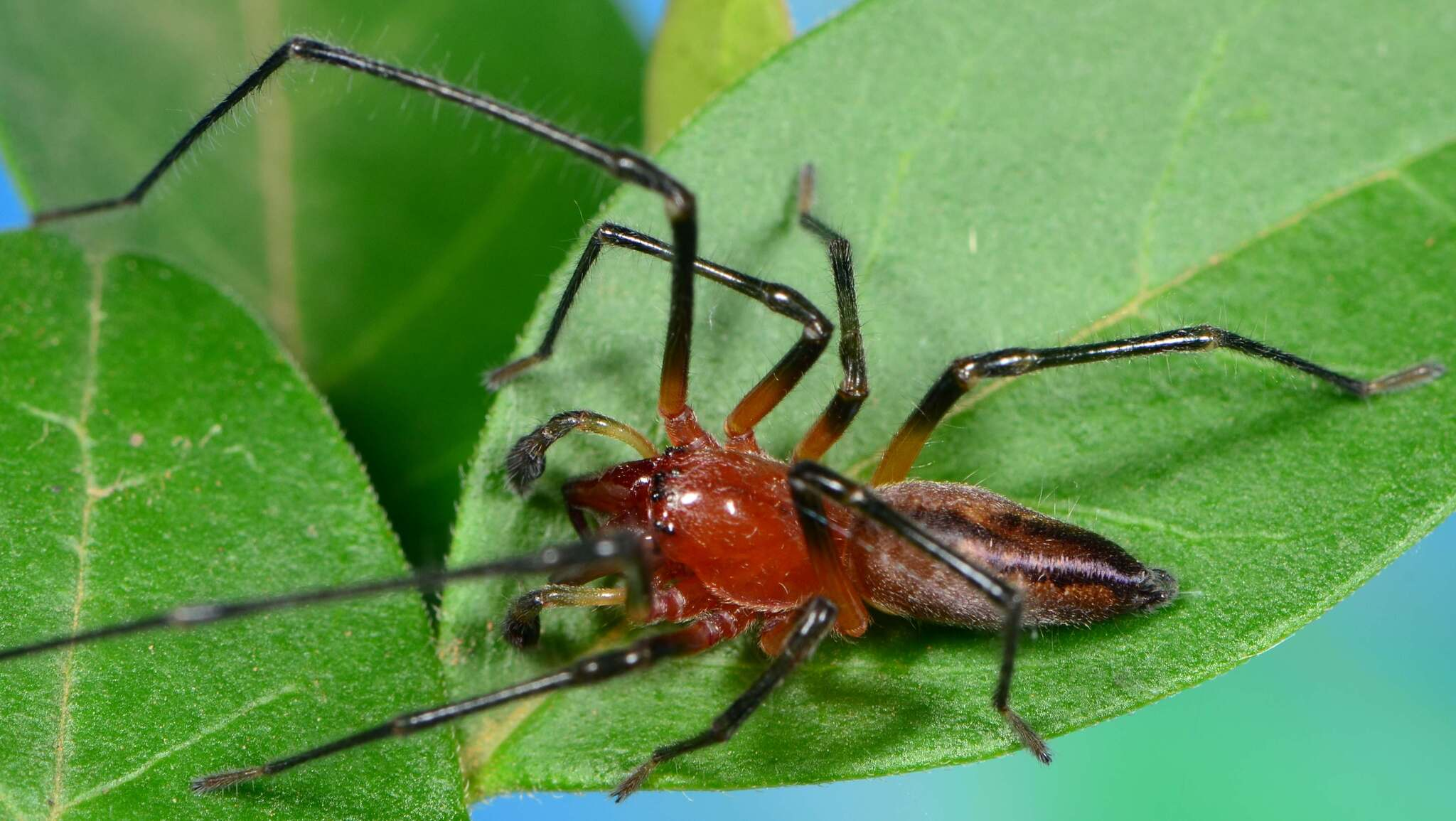
- Male
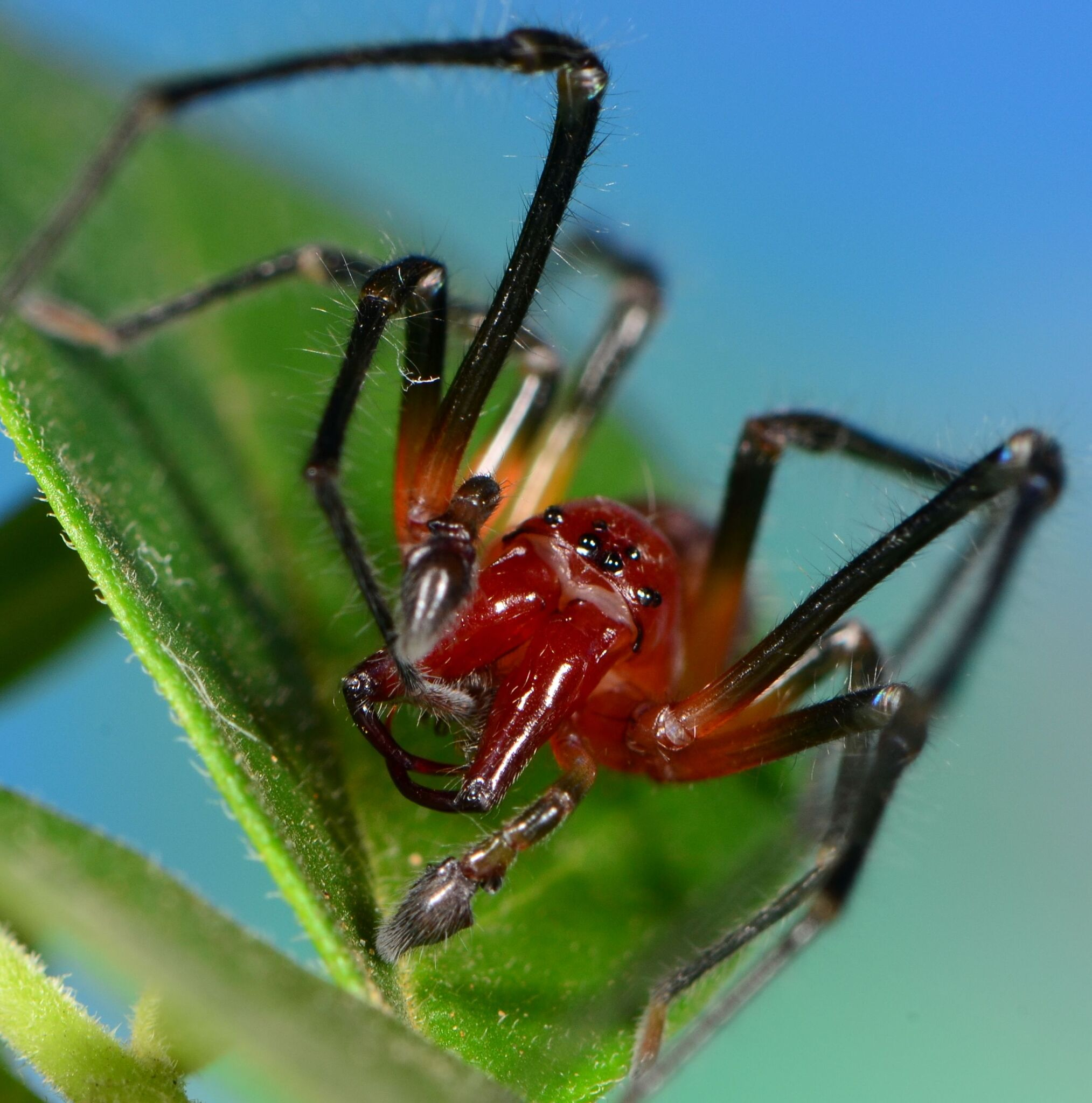
- Male

Scientific classification
- Kingdom: Animalia
- Phylum: Arthropoda
- Subphylum: Chelicerata
- Class: Arachnida
- Order: Araneae
- Infraorder: Araneomorphae
- Family: Cheiracanthiidae
- Genus: Cheiramiona
- Species: C. krugerensis

Binomial name
- Cheiramiona krugerensis Lotz, 2002

= Cheiramiona krugerensis =

Krugerpark Long-legged Sac Spider

Species of spider

Cheiramiona krugerensis is a species of spider in the family Cheiracanthiidae. It is a South African endemic described from Kruger National Park.

== Distribution ==
The species is recorded from five provinces at elevations from 5–1362 m above sea level.

== Habitat ==
This species is a free-living plant dweller collected by sifting forest litter, sweeping rehabilitated coastal forest, mixed grass and litter from the Fynbos, Forest, Grassland, Indian Ocean Coastal Belt, Savanna and Thicket biomes. It has also been sampled from avocado, citrus and mineola orchards and tomato fields.

== Description ==
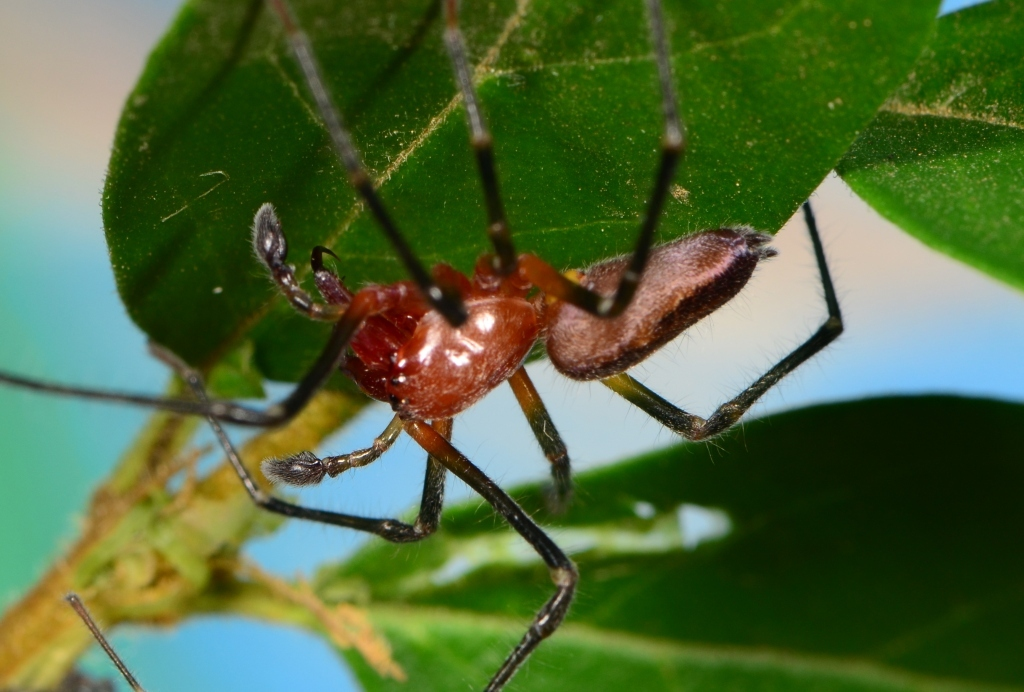
male

== Conservation ==
Due to its wide geographic range, it is listed as Least Concern. The species is protected in more than 10 protected areas.
