= Cheiramiona robinae =

Robin's Long-legged Sac Spider

Scientific classification
- Kingdom: Animalia
- Phylum: Arthropoda
- Subphylum: Chelicerata
- Class: Arachnida
- Order: Araneae
- Infraorder: Araneomorphae
- Family: Cheiracanthiidae
- Genus: Cheiramiona
- Species: C. robinae

Binomial name
- Cheiramiona robinae Lotz, 2015

Species of spider

Cheiramiona robinae is a species of spider in the family Cheiracanthiidae. It is a South African Eastern Cape endemic described from Cwebe Nature Reserve.

== Distribution ==
The species is presently known only from localities in the Pondoland region at 19 m above sea level.

== Habitat ==
This species is a free-living plant dweller collected by beating vegetation in coastal dune forest in the Indian Ocean Coastal Belt Biome.

== Conservation ==
The species is listed as Data Deficient because more sampling is needed to collect females and determine its full range. It is protected in Cwebe Nature Reserve.
