= List of Cheiracanthiidae species =

This page lists all described species of the spider family Cheiracanthiidae accepted by the World Spider Catalog as of February 2021:

== C ==
=== Calamoneta ===
Calamoneta Deeleman-Reinhold, 2001

- C. djojosudharmoi Deeleman-Reinhold, 2001 (type) — Indonesia (Sumatra)
- C. urata Deeleman-Reinhold, 2001 — Indonesia (Java)

=== Calamopus ===
Calamopus Deeleman-Reinhold, 2001

- C. phyllicola Deeleman-Reinhold, 2001 (type) — Thailand
- C. tenebrarum Deeleman-Reinhold, 2001 — Indonesia

=== Cheiracanthium ===
Cheiracanthium C. L. Koch, 1839

- C. abbreviatum Simon, 1878 — France, Denmark
- C. aculeatum Simon, 1884 — Africa
- C. aden Lotz, 2007 — Yemen
- C. adjacens O. Pickard-Cambridge, 1885 — Pakistan
- C. africanum Lessert, 1921 — Africa, Madagascar, Réunion
- C. aizwalense Biswas & Biswas, 2007 — India
- C. aladanense Lotz, 2007 — Yemen
- C. albidulum (Blackwall, 1859) — Madeira
- C. algarvense Wunderlich, 2012 — Portugal, Spain
- C. ambrense Lotz, 2014 — Madagascar
- C. ampijoroa Lotz, 2014 — Madagascar
- C. andamanense (Tikader, 1977) — India (Andaman Is.)
- C. andranomay Lotz, 2014 — Madagascar
- C. angolense Lotz, 2007 — Angola, Zimbabwe, South Africa
- C. angulitarse Simon, 1878 — Spain, France (Corsica), Italy, Hungary, Romania
- C. anjozorobe Lotz, 2014 — Madagascar
- C. annulipes O. Pickard-Cambridge, 1872 — Spain, Egypt, Israel
- C. antungense Chen & Huang, 2012 — Taiwan
- C. apia Platnick, 1998 — Samoa
- C. approximatum O. Pickard-Cambridge, 1885 — Pakistan, India, Myanmar, Laos to China, Taiwan, Philippines
- C. ashleyi Lotz, 2014 — Madagascar
- C. auenati Caporiacco, 1936 — Libya
- C. auriculatum Zhang, Zhang & Yu, 2018 — China
- C. bantaengi Merian, 1911 — Indonesia (Sulawesi)
- C. barbarum (Lucas, 1846) — Algeria
- C. boendense Lotz, 2015 — Congo
- C. brevidens Kroneberg, 1875 — Central Asia
- C. brevispinum Song, Feng & Shang, 1982 — Mongolia, China, Korea
- C. campestre Lohmander, 1944 — Sweden, Denmark, Central Europe, Romania, Ukraine, Russia (Europe)
- C. canariense Wunderlich, 1987 — Canary Is., Turkey, Egypt
- C. catindigae Barrion & Litsinger, 1995 — Philippines
- C. caudatum (Thorell, 1887) — Myanmar
- C. chayuense Li & Zhang, 2019 — China
- C. conflexum Simon, 1906 — India
- C. conspersum (Thorell, 1891) — India (Nicobar Is.)
- C. crucigerum Rainbow, 1920 — Australia (Norfolk Is.)
- C. danieli Tikader, 1975 — India
- C. daofeng Yu & Li, 2020 — China
- C. daquilium Barrion & Litsinger, 1995 — Indonesia, Philippines
- C. debile Simon, 1890 — Chad, Yemen
- C. denisi Caporiacco, 1939 — Ethiopia, Congo
- C. dippenaarae Lotz, 2007 — South Africa
- C. duanbi Yu & Li, 2020 — China
- C. echinulatum Zhang, Zhang & Yu, 2018 — China
- C. effossum Herman, 1879 — Central to eastern Europe
- C. elegans Thorell, 1875 — Europe, Turkey, Caucasus, Russia (Europe to South Siberia), Kazakhstan, Iran, Central Asia
- C. equestre O. Pickard-Cambridge, 1874 — Libya, Egypt
- C. erraticum (Walckenaer, 1802) — Europe, Turkey, Caucasus, Russia (Europe to Far East), Iran, Central Asia, China, Korea, Japan
- C. escaladae Barrion, Barrion-Dupo & Heong, 2013 — China (Hainan)
- C. eutittha Bösenberg & Strand, 1906 — Taiwan, Japan, Korea?
- C. exilipes (Lucas, 1846) — Algeria
- C. exquestitum Zhang & Zhu, 1993 — China
- C. falcatum Chen, Huang, Chen & Wang, 2006 — Taiwan
- C. falcis Lotz, 2015 — Gabon
- C. festae Pavesi, 1895 — Israel
- C. fibrosum Zhang, Hu & Zhu, 1994 — China
- C. filiapophysium Chen & Huang, 2012 — Taiwan
- C. fisheri Lotz, 2014 — Madagascar
- C. floresense Wunderlich, 2008 — Azores
- C. foordi Lotz, 2015 — South Africa
- C. foulpointense Lotz, 2014 — Madagascar
- C. fujianense Gong, 1983 — China
- C. fulvotestaceum Simon, 1878 — France
- C. furax L. Koch, 1873 — Samoa
- C. furculatum Karsch, 1879 — Cape Verde Is., Africa, Madagascar, Comoros
- C. ghanaense Lotz, 2015 — Ghana
- C. gobi Schmidt & Barensteiner, 2000 — China
- C. gou Yu & Li, 2020 — China
- C. gracile L. Koch, 1873 — Australia (Queensland, New South Wales)
- C. gratum Kulczyński, 1897 — Germany, Hungary
- C. griswoldi Lotz, 2014 — Madagascar
- C. halophilum Schmidt & Piepho, 1994 — Cape Verde Is.
- C. haroniense Lotz, 2007 — Zimbabwe
- C. himalayense Gravely, 1931 — India
- C. hypocyrtum Zhang & Zhu, 1993 — China
- C. ienisteai Sterghiu, 1985 — Romania, Albania
- C. ilicis Morano & Bonal, 2016 — Spain
- C. impressum Thorell, 1881 — Australia (Queensland)
- C. incertum O. Pickard-Cambridge, 1869 — Sri Lanka
- C. inclusum (Hentz, 1847) — North America, Central America, Caribbean, South America. Introduced to Réunion
- C. incomptum (Thorell, 1891) — India (Nicobar Is.)
- C. indicum O. Pickard-Cambridge, 1874 — India, Sri Lanka
- C. inflatum Wang & Zhang, 2013 — China
- C. inornatum O. Pickard-Cambridge, 1874 — India
- C. insigne O. Pickard-Cambridge, 1874 — India, Sri Lanka, Thailand, Myanmar, Laos, China
- C. insulare (Vinson, 1863) — Madagascar, Réunion
- C. insulare L. Koch, 1866 — Samoa
- C. iranicum Esyunin & Zamani, 2020 — Iran
- C. isiacum O. Pickard-Cambridge, 1874 — Libya, Egypt
- C. itakeum Barrion & Litsinger, 1995 — Philippines
- C. jabalpurense Majumder & Tikader, 1991 — India
- C. japonicum Bösenberg & Strand, 1906 — Russia (Far East), Mongolia, China, Korea, Japan
- C. jocquei Lotz, 2014 — Comoros, Madagascar
- C. joculare Simon, 1909 — São Tomé and Príncipe
- C. jorgeense Wunderlich, 2008 — Azores
- C. jovium Denis, 1947 — Egypt
- C. kabalense Lotz, 2015 — Uganda
- C. kakamega Lotz, 2015 — Kenya
- C. kakumense Lotz, 2015 — Ivory Coast, Ghana, Congo
- C. kashmirense Majumder & Tikader, 1991 — India
- C. kazachstanicum Ponomarev, 2007 — Kazakhstan
- C. kenyaense Lotz, 2007 — Africa
- C. kibonotense Lessert, 1921 — Ethiopia, Congo, Kenya, Tanzania, Uganda
- C. klabati Merian, 1911 — Indonesia (Sulawesi)
- C. knipperi Lotz, 2011 — Tanzania
- C. kupense Lotz, 2007 — Cameroon
- C. lascivum Karsch, 1879 — Russia (Sakhalin), China, Korea, Japan
- C. leucophaeum Simon, 1897 — Madagascar
- C. ligawsolanum Barrion & Litsinger, 1995 — Philippines
- C. liplikeum Barrion & Litsinger, 1995 — Philippines
- C. liuyangense Xie, Yin, Yan & Kim, 1996 — China
- C. longimanum L. Koch, 1873 — Australia (Queensland), Tonga, Fiji, Vanuatu, New Caledonia
- C. longipes (Thorell, 1890) — Indonesia (Sumatra)
- C. ludovici Lessert, 1921 — Congo, Kenya, Tanzania, Madagascar
- C. lukiense Lotz, 2015 — Congo
- C. macedonicum Drensky, 1921 — Italy, Slovenia, Slovakia, Hungary, Romania, North Macedonia, Bulgaria
- C. madagascarense Lotz, 2014 — Comoros, Madagascar
- C. mahajanga Lotz, 2014 — Madagascar
- C. malkini Lotz, 2007 — Nigeria
- C. mangiferae Workman, 1896 — Singapore, Indonesia (Sumatra)
- C. maraisi Lotz, 2007 — Namibia, Botswana
- C. margaritae Sterghiu, 1985 — Romania
- C. mayombense Lotz, 2015 — Congo
- C. melanostomum (Thorell, 1895) — India, Bangladesh, Myanmar
- C. mertoni Strand, 1911 — Indonesia (Aru Is.)
- C. mildei L. Koch, 1864 — Europe, North Africa, Turkey, Middle East, Caucasus, Russia (Europe) to Central Asia. Introduced to North America, Argentina
- C. minahassae Merian, 1911 — Indonesia (Sulawesi)
- C. minshullae Lotz, 2007 — Zimbabwe, Botswana, South Africa
- C. molle L. Koch, 1875 — Africa, Saudi Arabia
- C. mondrainense Main, 1954 — Australia (Western Australia)
- C. mongolicum Schenkel, 1963 — Mongolia
- C. montanum L. Koch, 1877 — Europe, Turkey, Caucasus, Iran
- C. murinum (Thorell, 1895) — India, Myanmar
- C. mysorense Majumder & Tikader, 1991 — India, Bangladesh
- C. nalsaroverense Patel & Patel, 1973 — India
- C. nervosum Simon, 1909 — Australia (Western Australia)
- C. nickeli Lotz, 2011 — Mauritania
- C. ningmingense Zhang & Yin, 1999 — China
- C. occidentale L. Koch, 1882 — Spain (Minorca), Italy
- C. olliforme Zhang & Zhu, 1993 — China
- C. oncognathum Thorell, 1871 — Europe
- C. pallidum Rainbow, 1920 — Australia (Lord Howe Is.)
- C. pauriense Majumder & Tikader, 1991 — India
- C. pelasgicum (C. L. Koch, 1837) — Southern and eastern Europe, Turkey, Caucasus, Russia (Europe) to Tajikistan
- C. pennatum Simon, 1878 — Southern Europe, Romania
- C. pennuliferum Simon, 1909 — Australia (Western Australia)
- C. pennyi O. Pickard-Cambridge, 1873 — Europe, Turkey, Caucasus, Russia (Europe to South Siberia), Iran, Central Asia, China
- C. peregrinum Thorell, 1899 — Ivory Coast, Nigeria, Cameroon
- C. pichoni Schenkel, 1963 — China
- C. poonaense Majumder & Tikader, 1991 — India
- C. potanini Schenkel, 1963 — China
- C. punctipedellum Caporiacco, 1949 — Congo, Rwanda, Kenya
- C. punctorium (Villers, 1789) (type) — Europe, Turkey, Caucasus, Russia (Europe to South Siberia), Iran, Central Asia
- C. punjabense Sadana & Bajaj, 1980 — India
- C. ransoni Lotz, 2014 — Madagascar
- C. rehobothense Strand, 1915 — Israel
- C. rothi Lotz, 2014 — Madagascar
- C. ruandana (Strand, 1916) — Rwanda
- C. rupicola (Thorell, 1897) — Myanmar, China, Indonesia
- C. russellsmithi Lotz, 2007 — Ethiopia
- C. rwandense Lotz, 2011 — Rwanda
- C. saccharanalis Mukhtar, 2015 — Pakistan
- C. sadanai Tikader, 1976 — India
- C. sakoemicum Roewer, 1938 — New Guinea
- C. salsicola Simon, 1932 — France
- C. sambii Patel & Reddy, 1991 — India
- C. sansibaricum Strand, 1907 — Ivory Coast to Zanzibar
- C. saraswatii Tikader, 1962 — India
- C. schenkeli Caporiacco, 1949 — Kenya, Rwanda, Zimbabwe, Botswana, South Africa
- C. seidlitzi L. Koch, 1864 — Mediterranean to Central Asia
- C. seshii Patel & Reddy, 1991 — India
- C. shilabira Lotz, 2015 — Congo, Kenya
- C. shiluvanense Lotz, 2007 — South Africa
- C. sikkimense Majumder & Tikader, 1991 — India, Bangladesh
- C. silaceum Rainbow, 1897 — Australia (New South Wales)
- C. simaoense Zhang & Yin, 1999 — China
- C. simplex Thorell, 1899 — Cameroon, Nigeria
- C. siwi El-Hennawy, 2001 — Egypt
- C. solidum Zhang, Zhu & Hu, 1993 — China
- C. soputani Merian, 1911 — Indonesia (Sulawesi)
- C. spectabile (Thorell, 1887) — Myanmar
- C. sphaericum Zhang, Zhu & Hu, 1993 — China
- C. streblowi L. Koch, 1879 — Russia (Middle and South Siberia)
- C. striolatum Simon, 1878 — Western Mediterranean
- C. subinsulanum Li & Zhang, 2019 — China
- C. taegense Paik, 1990 — China, Korea, Japan
- C. tagorei Biswas & Raychaudhuri, 2003 — Bangladesh
- C. taiwanicum Chen, Huang, Chen & Wang, 2006 — China, Taiwan
- C. tanmoyi Biswas & Roy, 2005 — India
- C. tanzanense Lotz, 2015 — Tanzania
- C. taprobanense Strand, 1907 — Sri Lanka
- C. tenue L. Koch, 1873 — Australia (Queensland)
- C. tetragnathoide Caporiacco, 1949 — Kenya
- C. torricellianum Strand, 1911 — New Guinea
- C. torsivum Chen & Huang, 2012 — Taiwan
- C. triviale (Thorell, 1895) — India, Myanmar
- C. trivittatum Simon, 1906 — India
- C. truncatum (Thorell, 1895) — Myanmar
- C. turanicum Kroneberg, 1875 — Uzbekistan, Tajikistan
- C. turiae Strand, 1917 — Thailand to Australia (Queensland)
- C. uncinatum Paik, 1985 — China, Korea
- C. unicum Bösenberg & Strand, 1906 — Korea, Japan, China, Laos
- C. vankhedei Marusik & Fomichev, 2016 — Mongolia
- C. vansoni Lawrence, 1936 — Southern Africa
- C. verdense Lotz, 2011 — Cape Verde Is.
- C. virescens (Sundevall, 1833) — Europe, Caucasus, Russia (Europe to Far East), Iran, China
- C. vorax O. Pickard-Cambridge, 1874 — India
- C. warsai Mukhtar, 2015 — Pakistan
- C. wiehlei Chrysanthus, 1967 — New Guinea
- C. wilma (Benoit, 1977) — St. Helena
- C. wuquan Yu & Li, 2020 — China
- C. zebrinum Savelyeva, 1972 — Russia (South Siberia), Kazakhstan
- C. zhejiangense Hu & Song, 1982 — China, Korea

=== Cheiramiona ===
Cheiramiona Lotz & Dippenaar-Schoeman, 1999

- C. akermani (Lawrence, 1942) — South Africa
- C. amarifontis Lotz, 2003 — South Africa
- C. ansiae Lotz, 2003 — South Africa
- C. baviaan Lotz, 2015 — South Africa
- C. boschrandensis Lotz, 2015 — South Africa
- C. brandbergensis Lotz, 2005 — Namibia
- C. clavigera (Simon, 1897) (type) — South Africa
- C. collinita (Lawrence, 1938) — South Africa
- C. debeeri Lotz, 2015 — South Africa
- C. dubia (O. Pickard-Cambridge, 1874) — Egypt
- C. ferrumfontis Lotz, 2003 — South Africa
- C. filipes (Simon, 1898) — Zimbabwe, South Africa
- C. florisbadensis Lotz, 2003 — South Africa, Lesotho
- C. fontanus Lotz, 2003 — South Africa
- C. haddadi Lotz, 2015 — South Africa
- C. hewitti (Lessert, 1921) — Tanzania
- C. hlathikulu Lotz, 2015 — South Africa
- C. hogsbackensis Lotz, 2015 — South Africa
- C. ibayaensis Lotz, 2015 — Tanzania
- C. jakobsbaaiensis Lotz, 2015 — South Africa
- C. jocquei Lotz, 2003 — Malawi
- C. kalongensis Lotz, 2003 — Congo
- C. kentaniensis Lotz, 2003 — South Africa
- C. kirkspriggsi Lotz, 2015 — South Africa
- C. kivuensis Lotz, 2015 — Congo, Rwanda
- C. krugerensis Lotz, 2003 — South Africa
- C. lajuma Lotz, 2003 — South Africa
- C. lamorali Lotz, 2015 — Namibia
- C. langi Lotz, 2003 — Zimbabwe, South Africa
- C. lejeunei Lotz, 2003 — Congo, Malawi
- C. lindae Lotz, 2015 — South Africa
- C. malawiensis Lotz, 2015 — Malawi
- C. mkhambathi Lotz, 2015 — South Africa
- C. mlawula Lotz, 2003 — Eswatini, South Africa
- C. mohalensis Lotz, 2015 — Lesotho
- C. musosaensis Lotz, 2015 — Congo
- C. muvalensis Lotz, 2003 — Congo
- C. nyungwensis Lotz, 2015 — Rwanda
- C. paradisus Lotz, 2003 — Zimbabwe, South Africa
- C. plaatbosensis Lotz, 2015 — South Africa
- C. qachasneki Lotz, 2015 — South Africa
- C. regis Lotz, 2003 — South Africa
- C. robinae Lotz, 2015 — South Africa
- C. ruwenzoricola (Strand, 1916) — Congo
- C. saniensis Lotz, 2015 — South Africa
- C. silvicola (Lawrence, 1938) — South Africa
- C. simplicitarsis (Simon, 1910) — South Africa
- C. stellenboschiensis Lotz, 2003 — South Africa
- C. tembensis Lotz, 2015 — South Africa
- C. upperbyensis Lotz, 2015 — South Africa

== E ==
=== Ericaella ===
Ericaella Bonaldo, 1994

- E. florezi Bonaldo, Brescovit & Rheims, 2005 — Colombia
- E. kaxinawa Bonaldo, 1997 — Brazil
- E. longipes (Chickering, 1937) (type) — Panama
- E. samiria Bonaldo, 1994 — Peru, Brazil

=== Eutichurus ===
Eutichurus Simon, 1897

- E. abiseo Bonaldo, 1994 — Peru
- E. arnoi Bonaldo, 1994 — Colombia
- E. chingliputensis Majumder & Tikader, 1991 — India
- E. cumbia Bonaldo & Ramírez, 2018 — Colombia
- E. cuzco Bonaldo, 1994 — Peru
- E. ferox Simon, 1897 (type) — Ecuador
- E. furcifer Kraus, 1955 — El Salvador, Costa Rica
- E. ibiuna Bonaldo, 1994 — Brazil, Uruguay
- E. itamaraju Bonaldo, 1994 — Brazil
- E. keyserlingi Simon, 1897 — Colombia
- E. lizeri Mello-Leitão, 1938 — Bolivia, Argentina
- E. luridus Simon, 1897 — Peru, Brazil, Bolivia
- E. madre Bonaldo, 1994 — Peru, Brazil
- E. manu Bonaldo, 1994 — Peru
- E. marquesae Bonaldo, 1994 — Colombia
- E. murgai Bonaldo & Lise, 2018 — Peru
- E. nancyae Bonaldo & Saturnino, 2018 — Brazil
- E. pallatanga Bonaldo, 1994 — Ecuador
- E. paredesi Bonaldo & Saturnino, 2018 — Peru
- E. putus O. Pickard-Cambridge, 1898 — Panama, Colombia, Ecuador, Peru, Brazil
- E. ravidus Simon, 1897 — Brazil, Paraguay, Argentina
- E. saylapampa Bonaldo, 1994 — Peru
- E. sigillatus Chickering, 1937 — Panama
- E. silvae Bonaldo, 1994 — Ecuador, Peru
- E. tequendama Bonaldo & Lise, 2018 — Colombia
- E. tezpurensis Biswas, 1991 — India
- E. tropicus (L. Koch, 1866) — Colombia
- E. valderramai Bonaldo, 1994 — Colombia
- E. yalen Bonaldo, 1994 — Peru
- E. yungas Bonaldo & Ramírez, 2018 — Bolivia
- E. zarate Bonaldo, 1994 — Peru

=== Eutittha ===
Eutittha Thorell, 1878

- E. brevicalcarata (L. Koch, 1873) — Indonesia (Lombok), Australia (Western Australia)
- E. excavata (Rainbow, 1920) — Australia (Norfolk Is.)
- E. insulana Thorell, 1878 (type) — Indonesia (Moluccas: Ambon)
- E. lanceolata (Chrysanthus, 1967) — Indonesia (New Guinea)
- E. lompobattangi (Merian, 1911) — Indonesia (Sulawesi)
- E. marplesi (Chrysanthus, 1967) — Indonesia (New Guinea)
- E. mordax (L. Koch, 1866) — Australia, New Hebrides, Samoa, Solomon Is., Tonga?, French Polynesia?
- E. stratiotica (L. Koch, 1873) — Australia (Victoria, Tasmania), New Zealand
- E. submordax (Zhang, Zhu & Hu, 1993) — China, Taiwan, Japan

== L ==
=== Lessertina ===
Lessertina Lawrence, 1942

- L. capensis Haddad, 2014 — South Africa
- L. mutica Lawrence, 1942 (type) — South Africa

== M ==
=== Macerio ===
Macerio Simon, 1897

- M. chabon Ramírez, 1997 — Chile
- M. conguillio Ramírez, 1997 — Chile, Argentina
- M. flavus (Nicolet, 1849) (type) — Chile, Argentina
- M. lanin Bonaldo & Brescovit, 1997 — Chile, Argentina
- M. nicoleti (Mello-Leitão, 1951) — Chile
- M. nublio Bonaldo & Brescovit, 1997 — Chile
- M. pichono Bonaldo & Brescovit, 1997 — Chile
- M. pucalan Ramírez, 1997 — Chile

== R ==
=== Radulphius ===
Radulphius Keyserling, 1891

- R. barueri Bonaldo & Buckup, 1995 — Brazil
- R. bicolor Keyserling, 1891 (type) — Brazil
- R. bidentatus Bonaldo & Buckup, 1995 — Brazil
- R. boraceia Bonaldo & Buckup, 1995 — Brazil
- R. caldas Bonaldo & Buckup, 1995 — Brazil
- R. camacan Bonaldo, 1994 — Brazil
- R. cambara Bonaldo & Buckup, 1995 — Brazil
- R. caparao Bonaldo & Buckup, 1995 — Brazil
- R. lane Bonaldo & Buckup, 1995 — Brazil
- R. laticeps Keyserling, 1891 — Brazil
- R. latus Bonaldo & Buckup, 1995 — Brazil
- R. monticola (Roewer, 1951) — Brazil
- R. petropolis Bonaldo & Buckup, 1995 — Brazil
- R. pintodarochai Bonaldo & Buckup, 1995 — Brazil
- R. singularis Bonaldo & Buckup, 1995 — Brazil

== S ==
=== Sinocanthium ===
Sinocanthium Yu & Li, 2020

- S. shuangqiu Yu & Li, 2020 (type) — China

=== Strotarchus ===
Strotarchus Simon, 1888

- S. alboater Dyal, 1935 — Pakistan
- S. beepbeep Bonaldo, Saturnino, Ramírez & Brescovit, 2012 — USA
- S. bolero Bonaldo, Saturnino, Ramírez & Brescovit, 2012 — Mexico
- S. gandu Bonaldo, Saturnino, Ramírez & Brescovit, 2012 — Brazil
- S. jacala Bonaldo, Saturnino, Ramírez & Brescovit, 2012 — Mexico
- S. mazamitla Bonaldo, Saturnino, Ramírez & Brescovit, 2012 — Mexico
- S. michoacan Bonaldo, Saturnino, Ramírez & Brescovit, 2012 — Mexico
- S. minor Banks, 1909 — Costa Rica
- S. monasticus Bonaldo, Saturnino, Ramírez & Brescovit, 2012 — Mexico
- S. nebulosus Simon, 1888 (type) — Mexico
- S. piscatorius (Hentz, 1847) — USA, Mexico
- S. planeticus Edwards, 1958 — USA, Mexico
- S. praedator (O. Pickard-Cambridge, 1898) — Mexico
- S. silvae Bonaldo, Saturnino, Ramírez & Brescovit, 2012 — Peru
- S. tamaulipas Bonaldo, Saturnino, Ramírez & Brescovit, 2012 — Mexico
- S. tlaloc Bonaldo, Saturnino, Ramírez & Brescovit, 2012 — Mexico
- S. tropicus (Mello-Leitão, 1917) — Brazil
- S. urarina Bonaldo, Saturnino, Ramírez & Brescovit, 2012 — Peru
- S. violaceus F. O. Pickard-Cambridge, 1899 — Mexico
- S. vittatus Dyal, 1935 — Pakistan

=== Summacanthium ===
Summacanthium Deeleman-Reinhold, 2001

- S. androgynum Deeleman-Reinhold, 2001 — Indonesia (Sulawesi)
- S. storki Deeleman-Reinhold, 2001 (type) — Indonesia (Sulawesi)

== T ==
=== Tecution ===
Tecution Benoit, 1977

- T. helenicola Benoit, 1977 — St. Helena
- T. mellissi (O. Pickard-Cambridge, 1873) — St. Helena
- T. planum (O. Pickard-Cambridge, 1873) (type) — St. Helena
