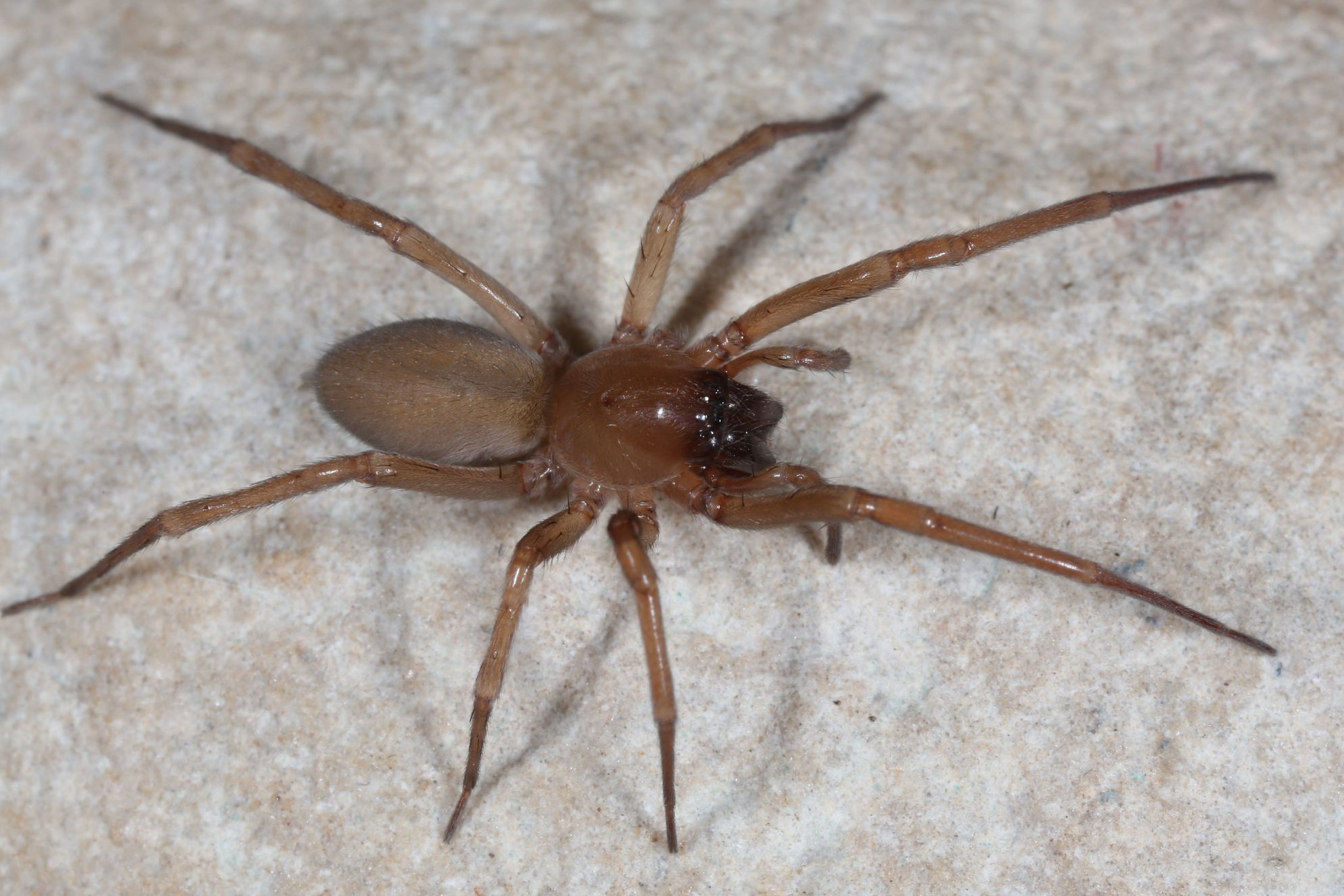

Scientific classification
- Kingdom: Animalia
- Phylum: Arthropoda
- Subphylum: Chelicerata
- Class: Arachnida
- Order: Araneae
- Infraorder: Araneomorphae
- Family: Cheiracanthiidae
- Genus: Strotarchus
- Species: S. beepbeep

Binomial name
- Strotarchus beepbeep Bonaldo, Saturnino, Ramírez & Brescovit, 2012

= Strotarchus beepbeep =

Species of spider

Strotarchus beepbeep is a species of spider within the family Cheiracanthiidae. The species has an orange carapace with pale margins. Chelicera is redish brown. Legs and abdomen are orange. It is found the southwestern United States in Arizona. The species name beepbeep is in reference to the sound of the Loony Tunes character Road Runner.
