= Cheiraignotum =

Scientific classification
- Kingdom: Animalia
- Phylum: Arthropoda
- Subphylum: Chelicerata
- Class: Arachnida
- Order: Araneae
- Infraorder: Araneomorphae
- Family: Cheiracanthiidae
- Genus: Cheiraignotum; Urones, 2024

Type species
- Cheiracanthium striolatum Simon, 1878

Species
- 2, see text

Genus of spiders

Cheiraignotum is a genus of spiders in the family Cheiracanthiidae.

== Distribution ==
Cheiraignotum is distributed across the Mediterranean region and southeastern Europe, extending to Algeria.

== Species ==
As of October 2025, this genus includes two species:

- Cheiraignotum macedonicum (Drensky, 1921) – Italy, Slovenia, Slovakia, Hungary, Romania, North Macedonia, Bulgaria
- Cheiraignotum striolatum (Simon, 1878) – Portugal, Spain, France, Italy, Slovenia, Algeria (type species)
