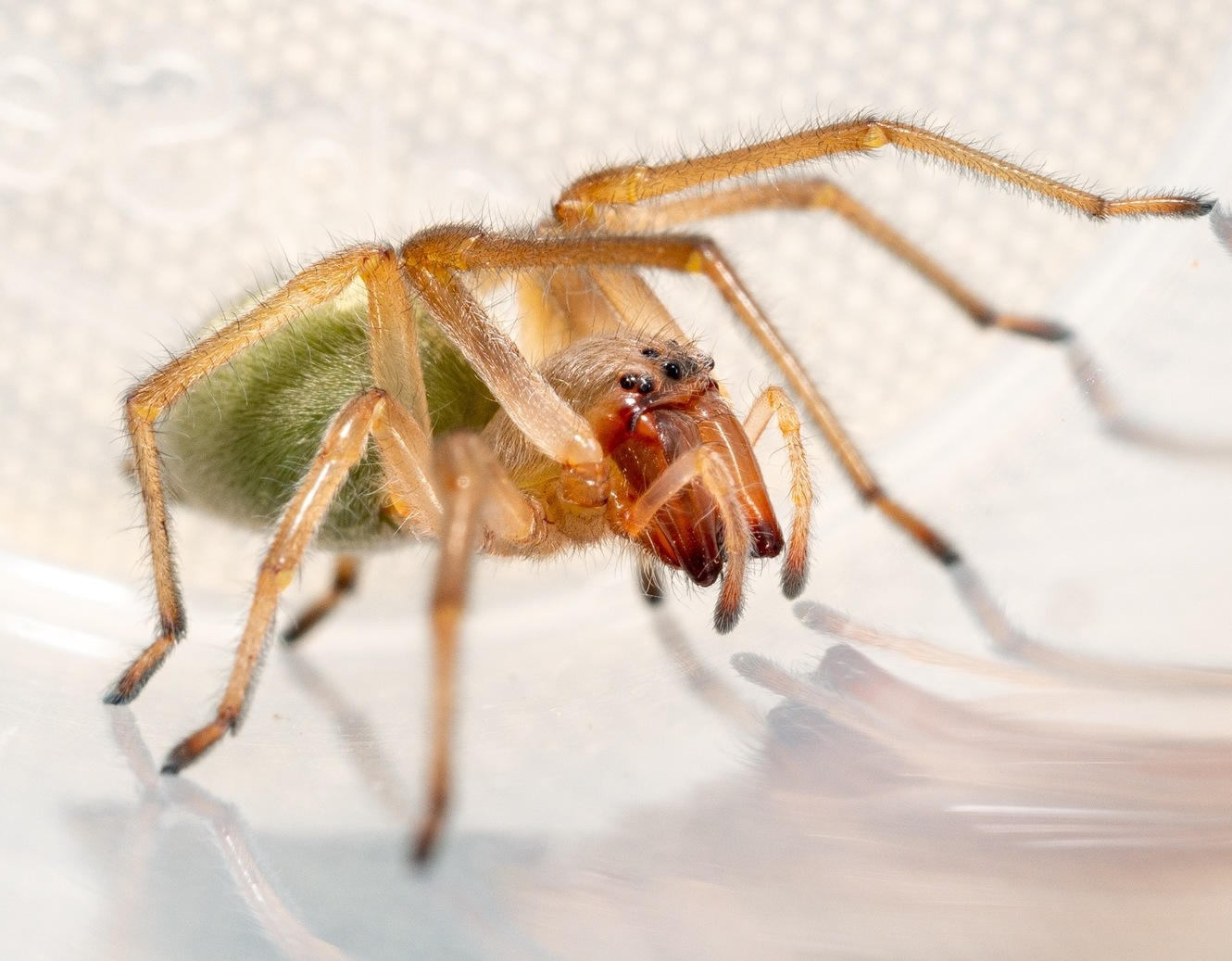
- Eutittha stratiotica

Scientific classification
- Kingdom: Animalia
- Phylum: Arthropoda
- Subphylum: Chelicerata
- Class: Arachnida
- Order: Araneae
- Infraorder: Araneomorphae
- Family: Cheiracanthiidae
- Genus: Eutittha; Thorell, 1878

Type species
- E. insulana Thorell, 1878

Species
- 9, see text

= Eutittha =

Genus of spiders

Eutittha is a genus of spiders in the family Cheiracanthiidae. It was first described by Tamerlan Thorell in 1878.

== Species ==
As of November 2021 it contains 9 species:

- E. brevicalcarata (L. Koch, 1873) – Indonesia (Lombok), Australia (Western Australia)
- E. excavata (Rainbow, 1920) – Australia (Norfolk Is.)
- E. insulana Thorell, 1878 – Indonesia (Moluccas: Ambon)
- E. lanceolata (Chrysanthus, 1967) – Indonesia (New Guinea)
- E. lompobattangi (Merian, 1911) – Indonesia (Sulawesi)
- E. marplesi (Chrysanthus, 1967) – Indonesia (New Guinea)
- E. mordax (L. Koch, 1866) – Australia, New Hebrides, Samoa, Solomon Is., Tonga?, French Polynesia?
- E. stratiotica (L. Koch, 1873) – Australia (Victoria, Tasmania), New Zealand
- E. submordax (Zhang, Zhu & Hu, 1993) – China, Taiwan, Japan
