= Cheiracanthium macedonicum =

Scientific classification
- Kingdom: Animalia
- Phylum: Arthropoda
- Subphylum: Chelicerata
- Class: Arachnida
- Order: Araneae
- Infraorder: Araneomorphae
- Family: Cheiracanthiidae
- Genus: Cheiracanthium
- Species: C. macedonicum

Binomial name
- Cheiracanthium macedonicum Drensky, 1921

Species of spider

Cheiracanthium macedonicum is a spider species found in Bulgaria and North Macedonia.
