= Cheiracanthium algarvense =

Scientific classification
- Domain: Eukaryota
- Kingdom: Animalia
- Phylum: Arthropoda
- Subphylum: Chelicerata
- Class: Arachnida
- Order: Araneae
- Infraorder: Araneomorphae
- Family: Cheiracanthiidae
- Genus: Cheiracanthium
- Species: C. algarvense

Binomial name
- Cheiracanthium algarvense Wunderlich, 2012

Species of spider

Cheiracanthium algarvense is a spider species found in Portugal and Spain.
