= Lessertina capensis =

Cape Lessertina Sac Spider

Scientific classification
- Kingdom: Animalia
- Phylum: Arthropoda
- Subphylum: Chelicerata
- Class: Arachnida
- Order: Araneae
- Infraorder: Araneomorphae
- Family: Cheiracanthiidae
- Genus: Lessertina
- Species: L. capensis

Binomial name
- Lessertina capensis Haddad, 2014

Species of spider

Lessertina capensis is a species of spider in the family Cheiracanthiidae. It is a South African endemic described from Brenton-on-Sea.

== Distribution ==
The species is known only from two specimens sampled from the Western Cape Province at elevations from 99–499 m above sea level.

== Habitat ==
This species is a free-living ground dweller sampled from the litter layer in coastal forest from the Forest Biome.

== Conservation ==
The species is listed as Data Deficient because more sampling is needed to collect females and determine its full range.
