= Fijimoneta =

Scientific classification
- Kingdom: Animalia
- Phylum: Arthropoda
- Subphylum: Chelicerata
- Class: Arachnida
- Order: Araneae
- Infraorder: Araneomorphae
- Family: Cheiracanthiidae
- Genus: Fijimoneta; Raven & Hebron, 2024

Type species
- F. vitilevu Raven & Hebron, 2024

Species
- 2, see text

Genus of spiders

Fijimoneta is a genus of spiders in the family Cheiracanthiidae.

== Distribution ==
Fijimoneta longimana is distributed across the South Pacific region, occurring in Fiji, Samoa, Tonga, Vanuatu, and New Caledonia, as well as in Queensland, Australia. F. vitilevu is endemic to Fiji.

== Species ==
As of October 2025, this genus includes two species:

- Fijimoneta longimana (L. Koch, 1873) – Australia (Queensland), Tonga, Samoa, Fiji, Vanuatu, New Caledonia
- Fijimoneta vitilevu Raven & Hebron, 2024 – Fiji (type species)
