= Lessertina mutica =

Lessertina Sac Spider

Conservation status
- Least Concern (SANBI Red List)

Scientific classification
- Kingdom: Animalia
- Phylum: Arthropoda
- Subphylum: Chelicerata
- Class: Arachnida
- Order: Araneae
- Infraorder: Araneomorphae
- Family: Cheiracanthiidae
- Genus: Lessertina
- Species: L. mutica

Binomial name
- Lessertina mutica Lawrence, 1942

Species of spider

Lessertina mutica is a species of spider in the family Cheiracanthiidae. It is a South African endemic originally described from Umhlali, KwaZulu-Natal and serves as the type species of the genus Lessertina.

== Distribution ==
The species is known from three provinces at elevations from 10–1325 m above sea level.

== Habitat ==
This species is a free-living ground dweller sampled mainly from leaf litter of subtropical coastal and Afromontane forests with most records from spring and summer. It is known from the Savanna, Indian Ocean Coastal Belt and Forest biomes.

== Conservation ==
Due to its wide geographic range, the species is listed as Least Concern. It is protected in Cwebe Nature Reserve, Silaka Nature Reserve, Ingeli Forest Nature Reserve and Nylsvley Nature Reserve.
