= Macerio =

Scientific classification
- Kingdom: Animalia
- Phylum: Arthropoda
- Subphylum: Chelicerata
- Class: Arachnida
- Order: Araneae
- Infraorder: Araneomorphae
- Family: Cheiracanthiidae
- Genus: Macerio; Simon, 1897

Type species
- M. flavus (Nicolet, 1849)

Species
- 8, see text

Synonyms
- Nicoletina

Genus of spiders

Macerio is a genus of araneomorph spiders in the family Cheiracanthiidae, first described by Eugène Simon in 1897.

== Species ==
As of April 2019 it contains eight species:

- Macerio chabon Ramírez, 1997 — Chile
- Macerio conguillio Ramírez, 1997 — Chile, Argentina
- Macerio flavus (Nicolet, 1849) — Chile, Argentina
- Macerio lanin Bonaldo & Brescovit, 1997 — Chile, Argentina
- Macerio nicoleti (Mello-Leitão, 1951) — Chile
- Macerio nublio Bonaldo & Brescovit, 1997 — Chile
- Macerio pichono Bonaldo & Brescovit, 1997 — Chile
- Macerio pucalan Ramírez, 1997 — Chile
