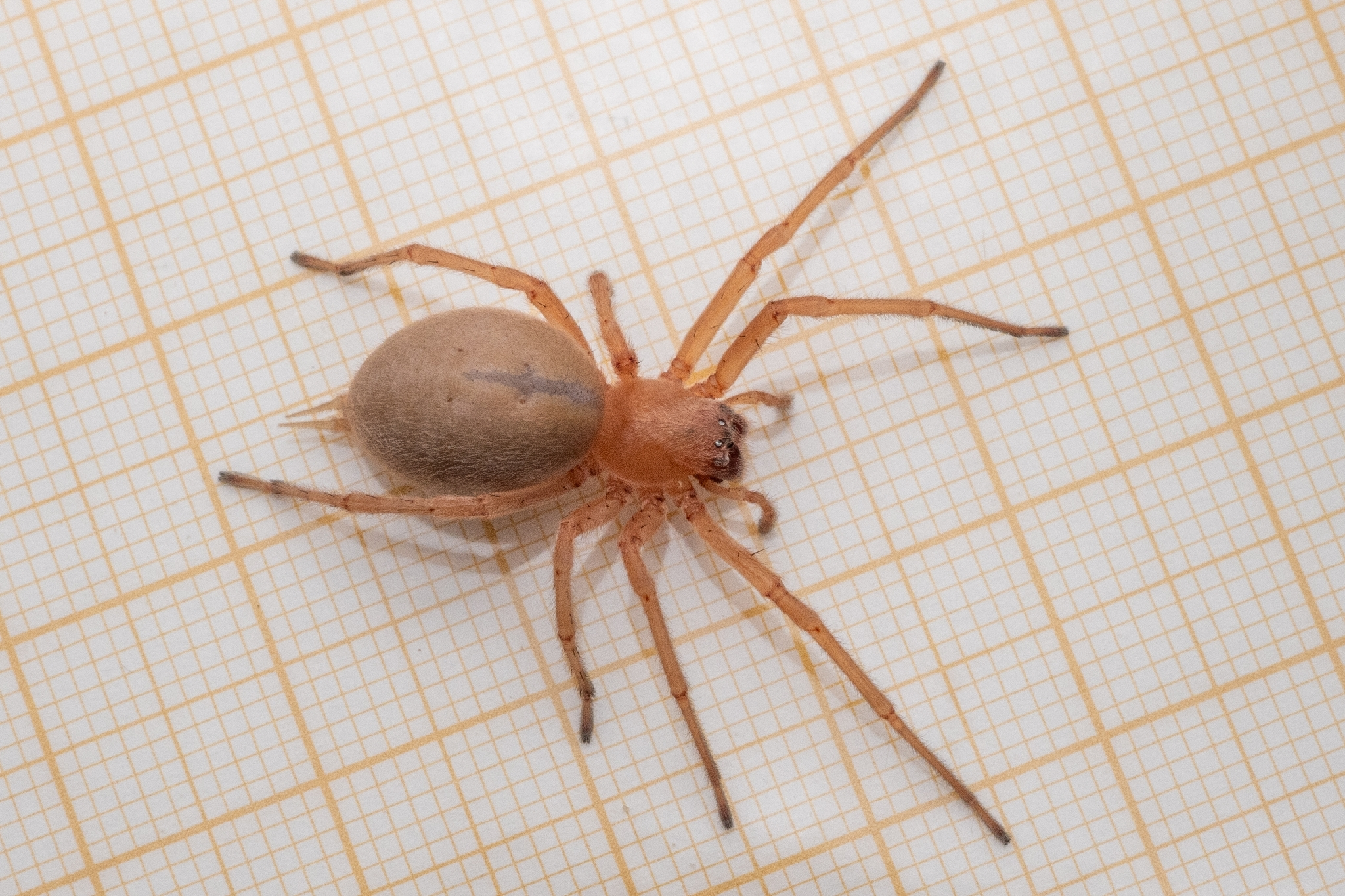
- Eutichurus ravidus

Scientific classification
- Kingdom: Animalia
- Phylum: Arthropoda
- Subphylum: Chelicerata
- Class: Arachnida
- Order: Araneae
- Infraorder: Araneomorphae
- Family: Cheiracanthiidae
- Genus: Eutichurus; Simon

Type species
- Eutichurus ferox

Species
- 32, see text

= Eutichurus =

Genus of spiders

Eutichurus is a genus of spiders in the family Cheiracanthiidae. It was first described in 1897 by Eugène Simon. As of June 2021, it contained 32 species found in South America, and two species in India.

== Species ==
Eutichurus comprises the following species:

- Eutichurus abiseo Bonaldo, 1994
- Eutichurus arnoi Bonaldo, 1994
- Eutichurus brescoviti Bonaldo, 1994
- Eutichurus chingliputensis Majumder & Tikader, 1991
- Eutichurus cumbia Bonaldo & Ramírez, 2018
- Eutichurus cuzco Bonaldo, 1994
- Eutichurus ferox Simon, 1897
- Eutichurus furcifer Kraus, 1955
- Eutichurus ibiuna Bonaldo, 1994
- Eutichurus itamaraju Bonaldo, 1994
- Eutichurus keyserlingi Simon, 1897
- Eutichurus lizeri Mello-Leitão, 1938
- Eutichurus luridus Simon, 1897
- Eutichurus madre Bonaldo, 1994
- Eutichurus manu Bonaldo, 1994
- Eutichurus marquesae Bonaldo, 1994
- Eutichurus murgai Bonaldo & Lise, 2018
- Eutichurus nancyae Bonaldo & Saturnino, 2018
- Eutichurus pallatanga Bonaldo, 1994
- Eutichurus paredesi Bonaldo & Saturnino, 2018
- Eutichurus putus O. Pickard-Cambridge, 1898
- Eutichurus ravidus Simon, 1897
- Eutichurus saylapampa Bonaldo, 1994
- Eutichurus sigillatus Chickering, 1937
- Eutichurus silvae Bonaldo, 1994
- Eutichurus tequendama Bonaldo & Lise, 2018
- Eutichurus tezpurensis Biswas, 1991
- Eutichurus tropicus (L. Koch, 1866)
- Eutichurus valderramai Bonaldo, 1994
- Eutichurus yalen Bonaldo, 1994
- Eutichurus yungas Bonaldo & Ramírez, 2018
- Eutichurus zarate Bonaldo, 1994
