= Ericaella =

Scientific classification
- Domain: Eukaryota
- Kingdom: Animalia
- Phylum: Arthropoda
- Subphylum: Chelicerata
- Class: Arachnida
- Order: Araneae
- Infraorder: Araneomorphae
- Family: Cheiracanthiidae
- Genus: Ericaella; Bonaldo

Type species
- Ericaella longipes

Species
- Ericaella florezi Bonaldo, Brescovit & Rheims, 2005; Ericaella kaxinawa Bonaldo, 1997; Ericaella longipes (Chickering, 1937); Ericaella samiria Bonaldo, 1994

Genus of spiders

Ericaella is a genus of spiders in the family Cheiracanthiidae. It was first described in 1994 by Bonaldo. This genus is named after the Brazilian arachnologist Erica Helena Buckup. As of 2017, it contains 4 species.
