= Tecution =

Scientific classification
- Kingdom: Animalia
- Phylum: Arthropoda
- Subphylum: Chelicerata
- Class: Arachnida
- Order: Araneae
- Infraorder: Araneomorphae
- Family: Cheiracanthiidae
- Genus: Tecution; Benoit, 1977
- Species: T. planum

Binomial name
- Tecution planum (O. Pickard-Cambridge, 1873)

Genus of spiders

Tecution is a genus of spiders from Saint Helena within the family Cheiracanthiidae. They were first described and named by Benoit in 1977. It was originally placed in the Clubionidae, but it was moved to Miturgidae in 1997, then to Cheiracanthiidae (syn. Eutichuridae) by Ramírez in 2014. The genus originally consisted of three species until fieldwork and morphological analysis by British arachnologist Danniella Sherwood and Saint Helenian colleagues demonstrated there is just one variable species, Tecution planum.
