= Radulphius =

Scientific classification
- Domain: Eukaryota
- Kingdom: Animalia
- Phylum: Arthropoda
- Subphylum: Chelicerata
- Class: Arachnida
- Order: Araneae
- Infraorder: Araneomorphae
- Family: Cheiracanthiidae
- Genus: Radulphius; Keyserling

Type species
- Radulphius bicolor

Species
- 15, see text

Genus of spiders

Radulphius is a genus of spiders in the family Cheiracanthiidae. It was first described in 1891 by Keyserling. As of 2017, it contains 15 species, all from Brazil.

== Species ==
Radulphius comprises the following species:

- Radulphius barueri Bonaldo & Buckup, 1995
- Radulphius bicolor Keyserling, 1891
- Radulphius bidentatus Bonaldo & Buckup, 1995
- Radulphius boraceia Bonaldo & Buckup, 1995
- Radulphius caldas Bonaldo & Buckup, 1995
- Radulphius camacan Bonaldo, 1994
- Radulphius cambara Bonaldo & Buckup, 1995
- Radulphius caparao Bonaldo & Buckup, 1995
- Radulphius lane Bonaldo & Buckup, 1995
- Radulphius laticeps Keyserling, 1891
- Radulphius latus Bonaldo & Buckup, 1995
- Radulphius monticola (Roewer, 1951)
- Radulphius petropolis Bonaldo & Buckup, 1995
- Radulphius pintodarochai Bonaldo & Buckup, 1995
- Radulphius singularis Bonaldo & Buckup, 1995
