= Lessertina =

Scientific classification
- Kingdom: Animalia
- Phylum: Arthropoda
- Subphylum: Chelicerata
- Class: Arachnida
- Order: Araneae
- Infraorder: Araneomorphae
- Family: Cheiracanthiidae
- Genus: Lessertina; Lawrence, 1942

Type species
- L. mutica Lawrence, 1942

Species
- L. capensis Haddad, 2014 – South Africa; L. mutica Lawrence, 1942 – South Africa

Genus of spiders

Lessertina is a genus of sac spiders in the family Cheiracanthiidae, endemic to the eastern and southeastern parts of South Africa. The genus was first described by R. F. Lawrence in 1942 and is named after Swiss arachnologist Roger de Lessert. As of September 2025 it contains only two species.

== Description ==
Lessertina is a distinctive genus that can be easily recognised by its subrectangular carapace with a strongly raised, domed cephalic region, the wide separation of the lateral eyes from the medians, and the relatively closely positioned median eyes with their black coloration.

Medium-sized spiders measuring 6.25–8.20 mm in length, Lessertina species have a carapace surface that is finely wrinkled and sparsely covered in very short straight white setae, with several short curved setae in the eye region. The carapace is subrectangular and rounded posteriorly, with the eye region broad and the carapace broadest at the posterior of the second leg's coxa. The cephalic region is dome-shaped while the thoracic region has a gradual slope. There is no fovea present, but a very shallow depression may be visible.

The anterior eye row is procurved and the posterior eye row is straight. The median ocular quadrangle is narrower anteriorly than posteriorly and slightly wider than long.

The opisthosoma is oval and black, with or without markings, and covered in very short straight white setae. There is no dorsal scutum present, but two pairs of dorsal sigilla are present. The leg formula is 4123, with legs covered in very short straight setae.

== Habitat and distribution ==
Lessertina species are endemic to the eastern and southeastern parts of South Africa. They have mainly been collected from leaf litter of subtropical coastal and Afromontane forests.

== Taxonomy ==
The genus was originally described by Lawrence in 1942. Subsequent taxonomic work included notes on the genus by Dippenaar-Schoeman & Jocqué in 1997 and Bosselaers & Jocqué in 2000. The genus was comprehensively revised by Haddad in 2014. Originally placed in the family Corinnidae, Lessertina was transferred to the Eutichuridae (now Cheiracanthiidae) by Ramírez in 2014.

== Species ==
As of September 2025, the World Spider Catalog accepts two species:

- Lessertina capensis Haddad, 2014 – South Africa
- Lessertina mutica Lawrence, 1942 – South Africa
