= Sinocanthium =

Scientific classification
- Kingdom: Animalia
- Phylum: Arthropoda
- Subphylum: Chelicerata
- Class: Arachnida
- Order: Araneae
- Infraorder: Araneomorphae
- Family: Cheiracanthiidae
- Genus: Sinocanthium; Yu & Li, 2020
- Species: S. shuangqiu

Binomial name
- Sinocanthium shuangqiu Yu & Li, 2020

Genus of spiders

Sinocanthium is a monotypic genus of east Asian spiders in the family Cheiracanthiidae containing the single species, Sinocanthium shuangqiu. It was first described by J. S. Zhang, H. Yu and S. Q. Li in 2020, and it has only been found in China.
