= Summacanthium =

Scientific classification
- Domain: Eukaryota
- Kingdom: Animalia
- Phylum: Arthropoda
- Subphylum: Chelicerata
- Class: Arachnida
- Order: Araneae
- Infraorder: Araneomorphae
- Family: Cheiracanthiidae
- Genus: Summacanthium; Deeleman-Reinhold

Type species
- Summacanthium storki

Species
- Summacanthium androgynum Deeleman-Reinhold, 2001; Summacanthium storki Deeleman-Reinhold, 2001

Genus of spiders

Summacanthium is a genus of spiders in the family Cheiracanthiidae. It was first described in 2001 by Deeleman-Reinhold. As of 2017, it contains 2 species from Indonesia.
