= Calamoneta =

Scientific classification
- Kingdom: Animalia
- Phylum: Arthropoda
- Subphylum: Chelicerata
- Class: Arachnida
- Order: Araneae
- Infraorder: Araneomorphae
- Family: Cheiracanthiidae
- Genus: Calamoneta; Deeleman-Reinhold, 2001

Species
- Calamoneta djojosudharmoi Deeleman-Reinhold, 2001; Calamoneta urata Deeleman-Reinhold, 2001

Genus of spiders

Calamoneta is a genus of southeastern Asian spiders within the family Cheiracanthiidae. It was originally placed in the Miturgidae, but it was moved by Ramírez in 2014. It was named and first described by Christa Deeleman-Reinhold in 2001. The name is derived from the Greek "kalamos", meaning "something woven". There are two species in this genus, C. djojosudharmoi – the type species – and C. urata.

== Description ==
These spiders are thin and green, commonly found on the undersides of leaves. They are found in parts of Sumatra, Java, and northern Queensland. The legs are long and thin. There is a small window before the coxa, and the trochanters do not have any notches. A round depression is in the place of the thoracic groove. In males, the chelicerae are longer and projected. Spiders of this genus can be distinguished from other spiders of the family by the absence notches in the trochanters, the absence of a cymbial spur in males, and the absence of an epigynal window in females.
