= Calamopus =

Scientific classification
- Domain: Eukaryota
- Kingdom: Animalia
- Phylum: Arthropoda
- Subphylum: Chelicerata
- Class: Arachnida
- Order: Araneae
- Infraorder: Araneomorphae
- Family: Cheiracanthiidae
- Genus: Calamopus; Deeleman-Reinhold

Type species
- Calamopus phyllicola

Species
- Calamopus phyllicola Deeleman-Reinhold, 2001; Calamopus tenebrarum Deeleman-Reinhold, 2001

Genus of spiders

Calamopus is a genus of spiders in the family Cheiracanthiidae. It was first described in 2001 by Deeleman-Reinhold. As of 2017, it contains 2 species, from Thailand and Indonesia.
