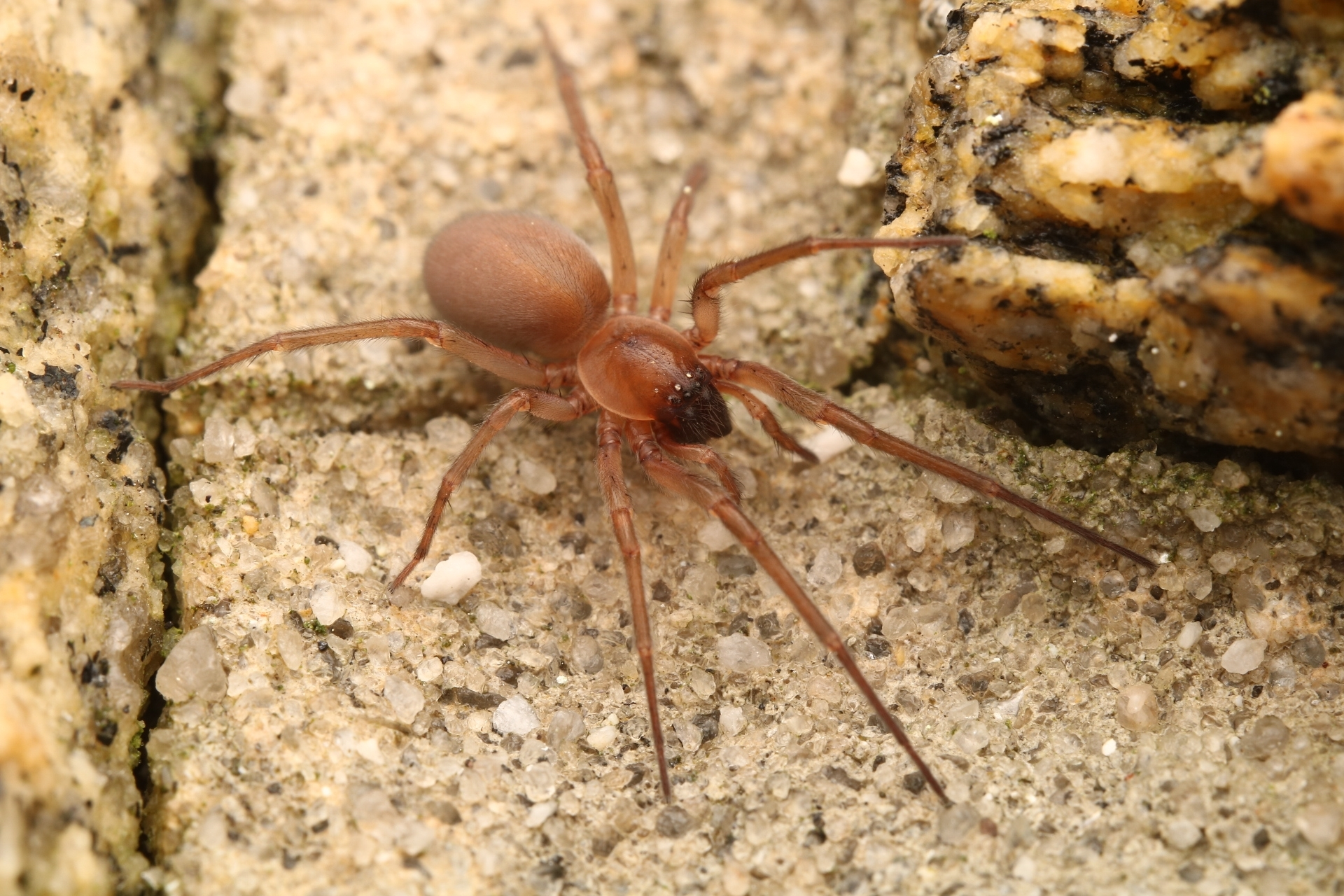
- Female
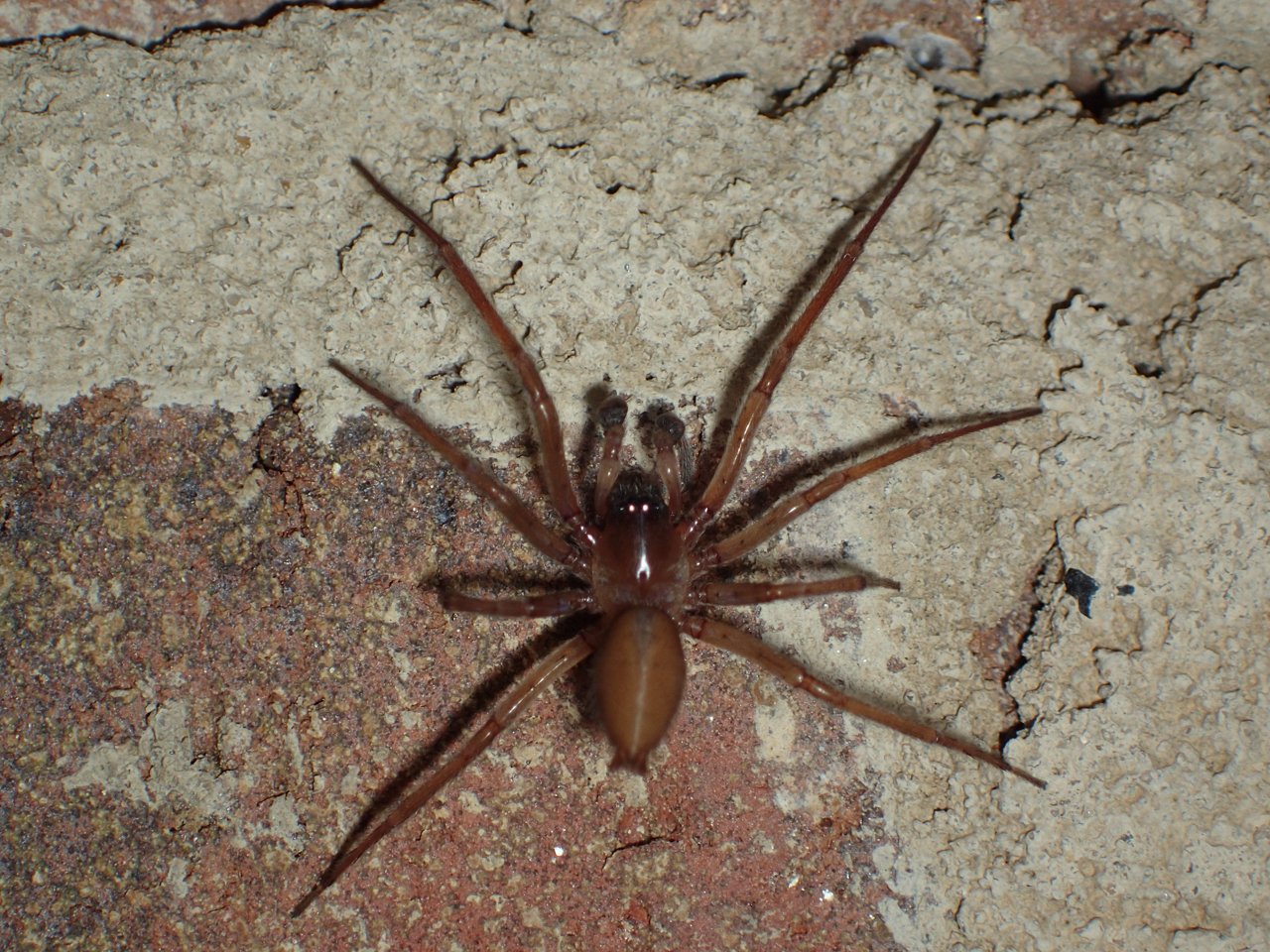
- Male

Scientific classification
- Kingdom: Animalia
- Phylum: Arthropoda
- Subphylum: Chelicerata
- Class: Arachnida
- Order: Araneae
- Infraorder: Araneomorphae
- Family: Cheiracanthiidae
- Genus: Strotarchus
- Species: S. piscatorius

Binomial name
- Strotarchus piscatorius (Hentz, 1847)

Synonyms
- Clubiona piscatoria Hentz, 1847; Anyphaena piscatoria Simon, 1897; Marcellina piscatoria Bryant, 1931

= Strotarchus piscatorius =

Species of spider

Strotarchus piscatorius is a species of true spiders in the family Cheiracanthiidae. It is found in the USA and Mexico.

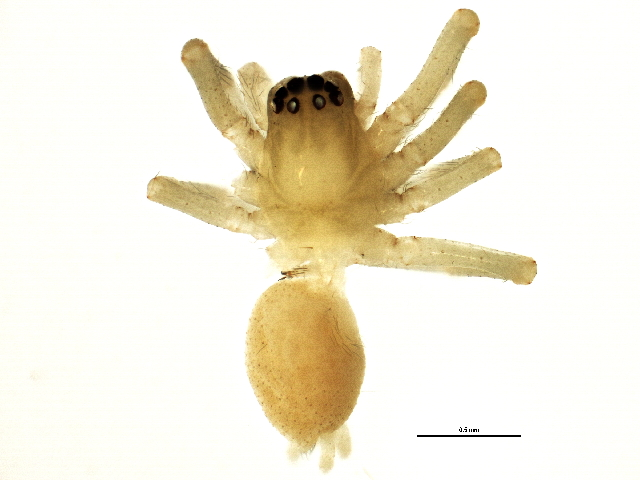
immature
