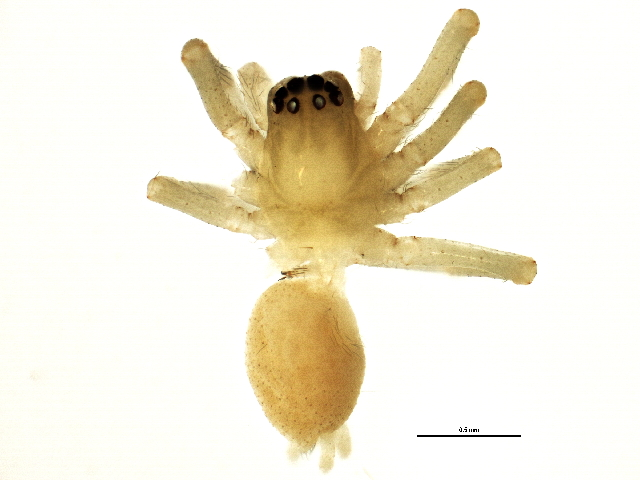
- S. piscatorius from the Great Smoky Mountains National Park

Scientific classification
- Kingdom: Animalia
- Phylum: Arthropoda
- Subphylum: Chelicerata
- Class: Arachnida
- Order: Araneae
- Infraorder: Araneomorphae
- Family: Cheiracanthiidae
- Genus: Strotarchus; Simon, 1888

Type species
- S. nebulosus Simon, 1888

Species
- 20, see text

Synonyms
- Coreidon Mello-Leitão, 1917; Marcellina Bryant, 1931

= Strotarchus =

Strotarchus Temporal range: Neogene– Present

Genus of spiders

Strotarchus is a genus of araneomorph spiders in the family Cheiracanthiidae that was first described by Eugène Louis Simon in 1888. Originally added to the Clubionidae, it was moved to the Miturgidae in 1967, and to the Cheiracanthiidae in 2014. It is considered a senior synonym of Marcellina and Coreidon.

== Species ==
As of September 2019 it contains twenty species, found in South America, Mexico, the United States, Costa Rica, and Pakistan:

- Strotarchus alboater Dyal, 1935 – Pakistan
- Strotarchus beepbeep Bonaldo, Saturnino, Ramírez & Brescovit, 2012 – USA
- Strotarchus bolero Bonaldo, Saturnino, Ramírez & Brescovit, 2012 – Mexico
- Strotarchus gandu Bonaldo, Saturnino, Ramírez & Brescovit, 2012 – Brazil
- Strotarchus jacala Bonaldo, Saturnino, Ramírez & Brescovit, 2012 – Mexico
- Strotarchus mazamitla Bonaldo, Saturnino, Ramírez & Brescovit, 2012 – Mexico
- Strotarchus michoacan Bonaldo, Saturnino, Ramírez & Brescovit, 2012 – Mexico
- Strotarchus minor Banks, 1909 – Costa Rica
- Strotarchus monasticus Bonaldo, Saturnino, Ramírez & Brescovit, 2012 – Mexico
- Strotarchus nebulosus Simon, 1888 (type) – Mexico
- Strotarchus piscatorius (Hentz, 1847) – USA, Mexico
- Strotarchus planeticus Edwards, 1958 – USA, Mexico
- Strotarchus praedator (O. Pickard-Cambridge, 1898) – Mexico
- Strotarchus silvae Bonaldo, Saturnino, Ramírez & Brescovit, 2012 – Peru
- Strotarchus tamaulipas Bonaldo, Saturnino, Ramírez & Brescovit, 2012 – Mexico
- Strotarchus tlaloc Bonaldo, Saturnino, Ramírez & Brescovit, 2012 – Mexico
- Strotarchus tropicus (Mello-Leitão, 1917) – Brazil
- Strotarchus urarina Bonaldo, Saturnino, Ramírez & Brescovit, 2012 – Peru
- Strotarchus violaceus F. O. Pickard-Cambridge, 1899 – Mexico
- Strotarchus vittatus Dyal, 1935 – Pakistan
