= Vladimir Wagner =

Russian naturalist, psychologist and zoologist

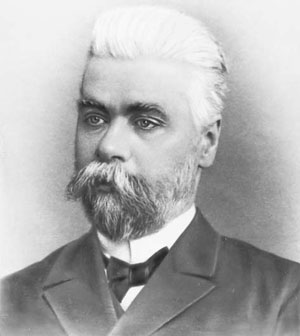
- Born: Vladimir Aleksandrovich Wagner; 29 March 1849; Kaluga, Russian Empire
- Died: March 8, 1934 (aged 84); Leningrad, USSR
- Occupations: naturalist, psychologist, zoologist, arachnologist
- Known for: studies of comparative and evolutionary psychology

Vladimir Aleksandrovich Wagner (or Vagner: Russian: Владимир Александрович Вагнер; March 29, 1849 – March 8, 1934) was a Russian psychologist and naturalist known for his studies of comparative and evolutionary psychology. He also studied spiders, and in 1882 proposed the first classification of spider families based on copulatory organs. His friend Anton Chekhov was inspired to write the novella, "The Duel", based on discussions with Wagner.

== Life and work ==
Wagner was born in Tula. He graduated from the law faculty (1874) and then in physics and mathematics (1882) from Moscow University. He spent some time at biological stations in Sevastapol, Naples and Villafranca. His first work was on marine invertebrate blood in collaboration with A. O. Kovalevsky and I. I. Mechnickov. His next major work was on the taxonomy of spiders, making use of such features as the construction pattern of webs. In 1889 he wrote a monograph on the spiders as a master's thesis at St. Petersburg University. He examined instinct in spiders. He taught at the Moscow Lyceum and at the private Perepelkina women's gymnasium. In 1901 his doctoral dissertation was on biological methods in zoopsychology (behavior) with an evolutionary perspective. In 1896 he became a departmental head at the Catherine Institute and in 1906 became a director at the Imperial Commercial School while also serving as a private associate professor at the St. Petersburg University. He organized a psychoneurology department begun by V. M. Bekhterev. He also edited a journal along with B.E. Raikov from 1912. He argued with the school of Pavlov and believed that instinct varied and that not everything could be reduced to reflex actions. He was critical of anthropomorphism as well as extreme reductionist views. From 1924 he also examined child development and recognized games played an important role in development. He also examined memory.
