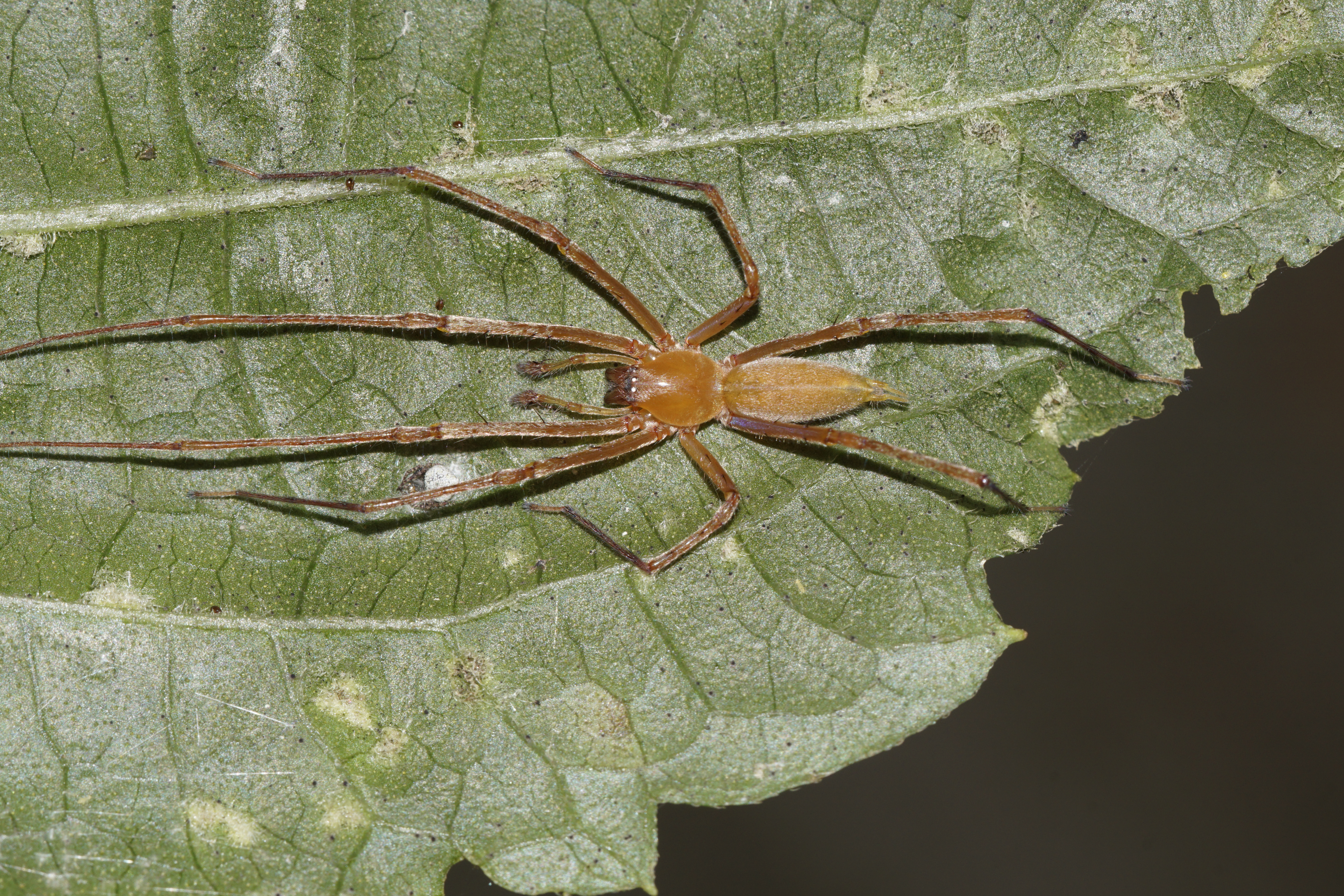
- Cheiracanthium danieli
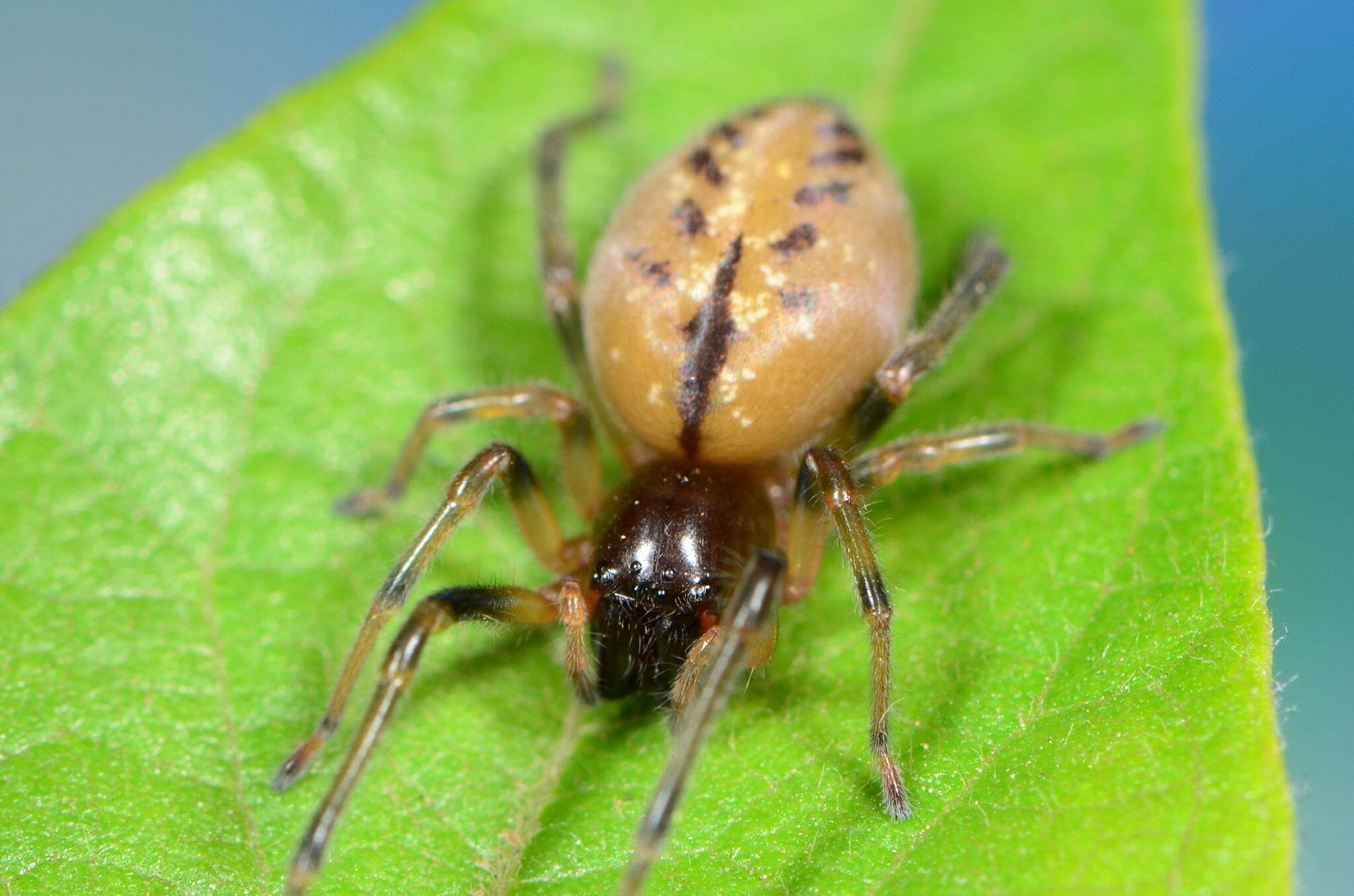
- Female Cheiramonia florisbadensis

Scientific classification
- Kingdom: Animalia
- Phylum: Arthropoda
- Subphylum: Chelicerata
- Class: Arachnida
- Order: Araneae
- Infraorder: Araneomorphae
- Family: Cheiracanthiidae; Wagner, 1887

Diversity
- 15 genera, 385 species
- blue: reported countries (WSC) green: observation hotspots (iNaturalist)

Synonyms
- Eutichuridae Lehtinen, 1967

= Cheiracanthiidae =

Family of spiders

Cheiracanthiidae is a family of araneomorph spiders first described by Vladimir Wagner in 1887. The synonym Eutichuridae was used for a long time, but Cheiracanthiidae has priority.

The largest genus currently recognized as belonging to this family is Cheiracanthium, which has previously been placed in both the Clubionidae and the Miturgidae.

== Taxonomy ==
It was recognized as a synonym of "Eutichuridae" in 2009, but was in danger of becoming obsolete until it was resurrected in 2011.

The group was originally described as the subfamily Eutichurinae of the family Miturgidae by Pekka T. Lehtinen in 1967. The monophyly of the group is described as "reasonably uncontroversial", but it has been placed in either the Miturgidae or the Clubionidae. An analysis by Martín J. Ramírez in 2014 suggested that it was better considered as a separate family.

== Genera ==
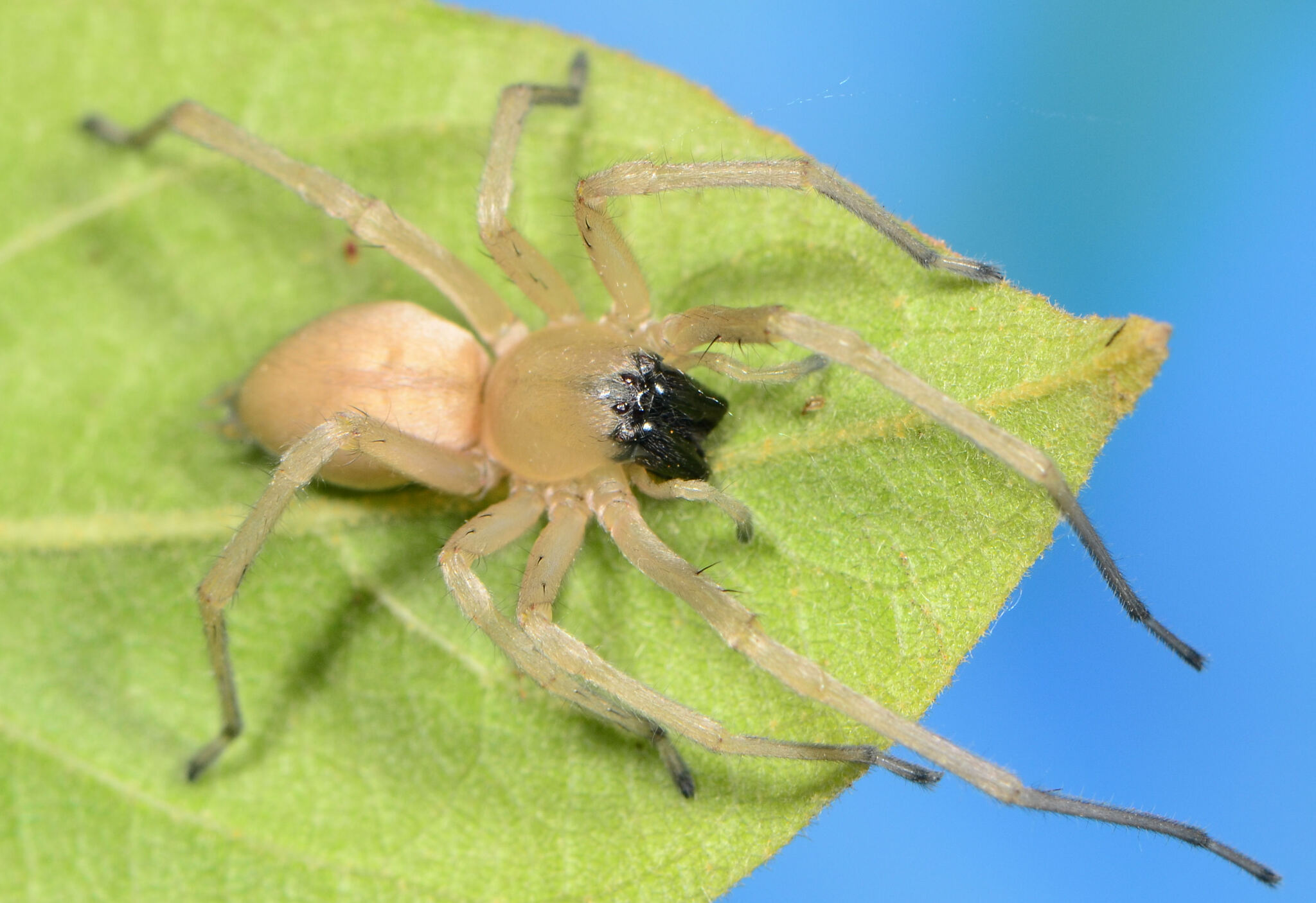
female Cheiracanthium furculatum

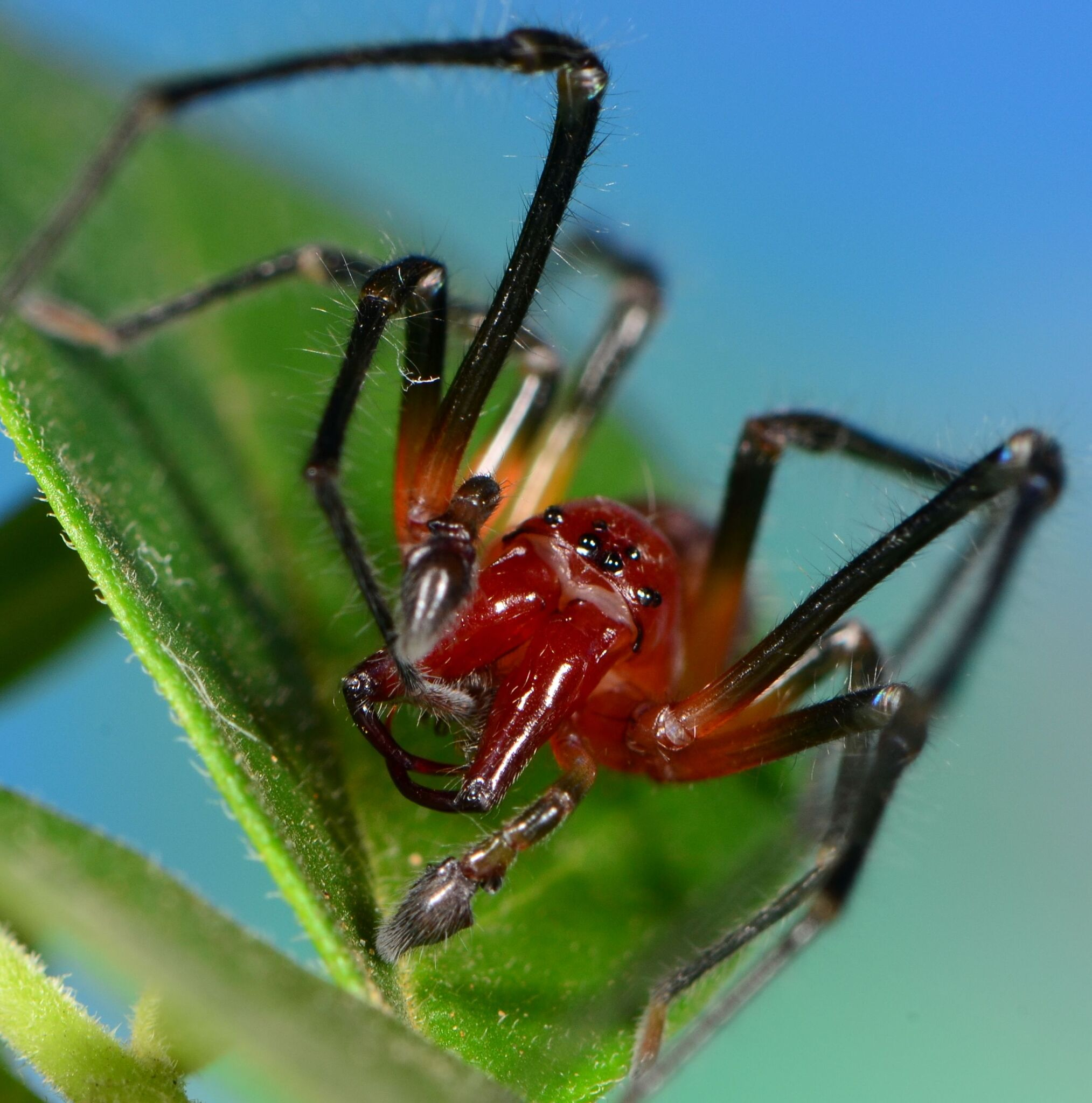
male Cheiramiona krugerensis

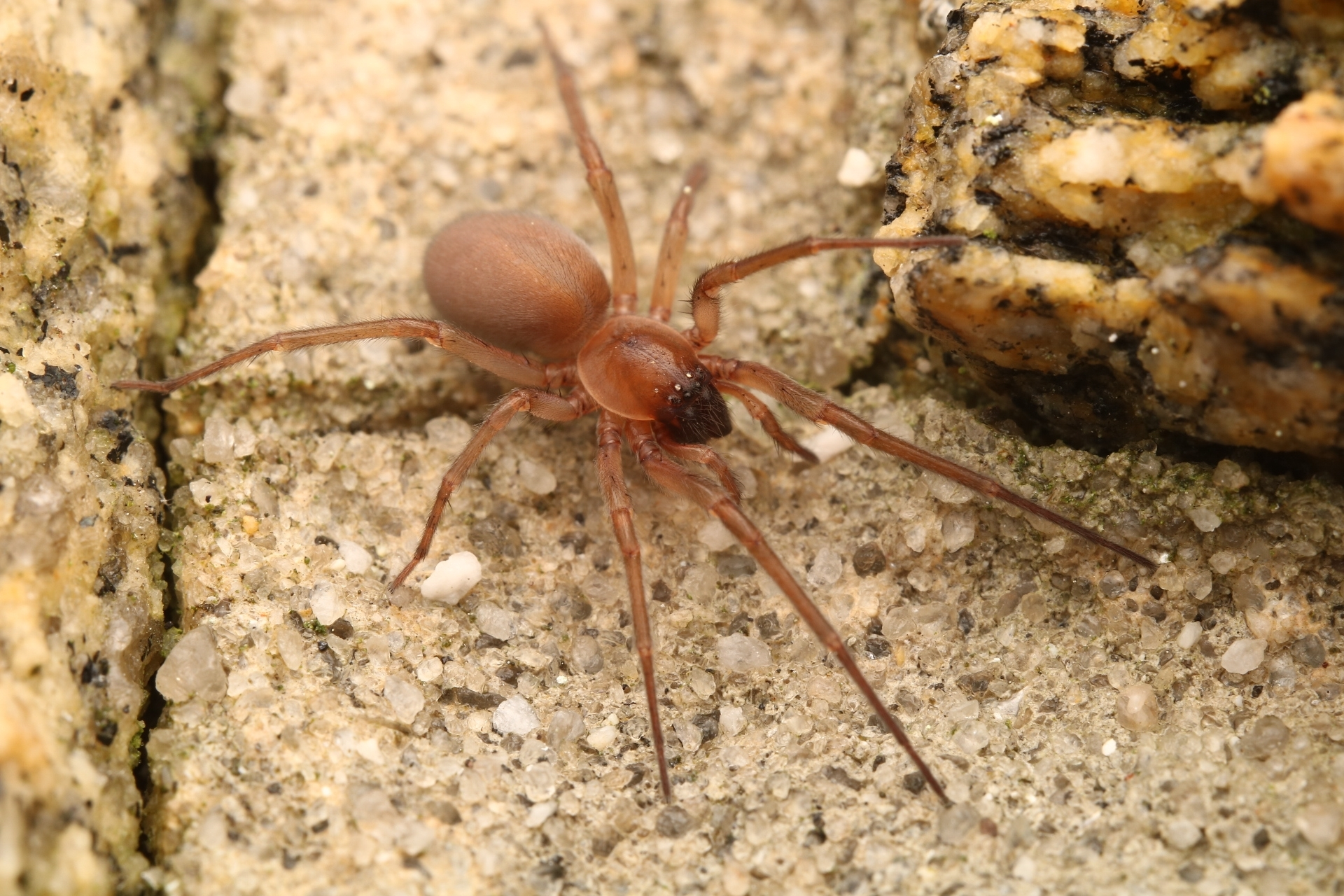
female Strotarchus piscatorius

As of January 2026, this family includes fifteen genera and 385 species:

- Calamoneta Deeleman-Reinhold, 2001 – Indonesia, Australia
- Calamopus Deeleman-Reinhold, 2001 – Indonesia, Thailand
- Cheiracanthium C. L. Koch, 1839 – Africa, Asia, Europe, Oceania, Central to eastern Europe, Ivory Coast to Zanzibar, Mediterranean to Central Asia, North Africa, New Hebrides. Introduced to Réunion, Argentina
- Cheiraignotum Urones, 2024 – Algeria, Europe
- Cheiramiona Lotz & Dippenaar-Schoeman, 1999 – Africa
- Ericaella Bonaldo, 1994 – Panama, Brazil, Colombia, Peru
- Eutichurus Simon, 1897 – India, Costa Rica, El Salvador, Panama, South America
- Fijimoneta Raven & Hebron, 2024 – Australia, Fiji, New Caledonia, Vanuatu, Samoa, Tonga
- Lessertina Lawrence, 1942 – South Africa
- Macerio Simon, 1897 – Argentina, Chile
- Radulphius Keyserling, 1891 – Brazil
- Sinocanthium Yu & Li, 2020 – China
- Strotarchus Simon, 1888 – Pakistan, Costa Rica, Honduras, Mexico, United States, Brazil, Peru
- Summacanthium Deeleman-Reinhold, 2001 – Indonesia
- Tecution Benoit, 1977 – St. Helena
