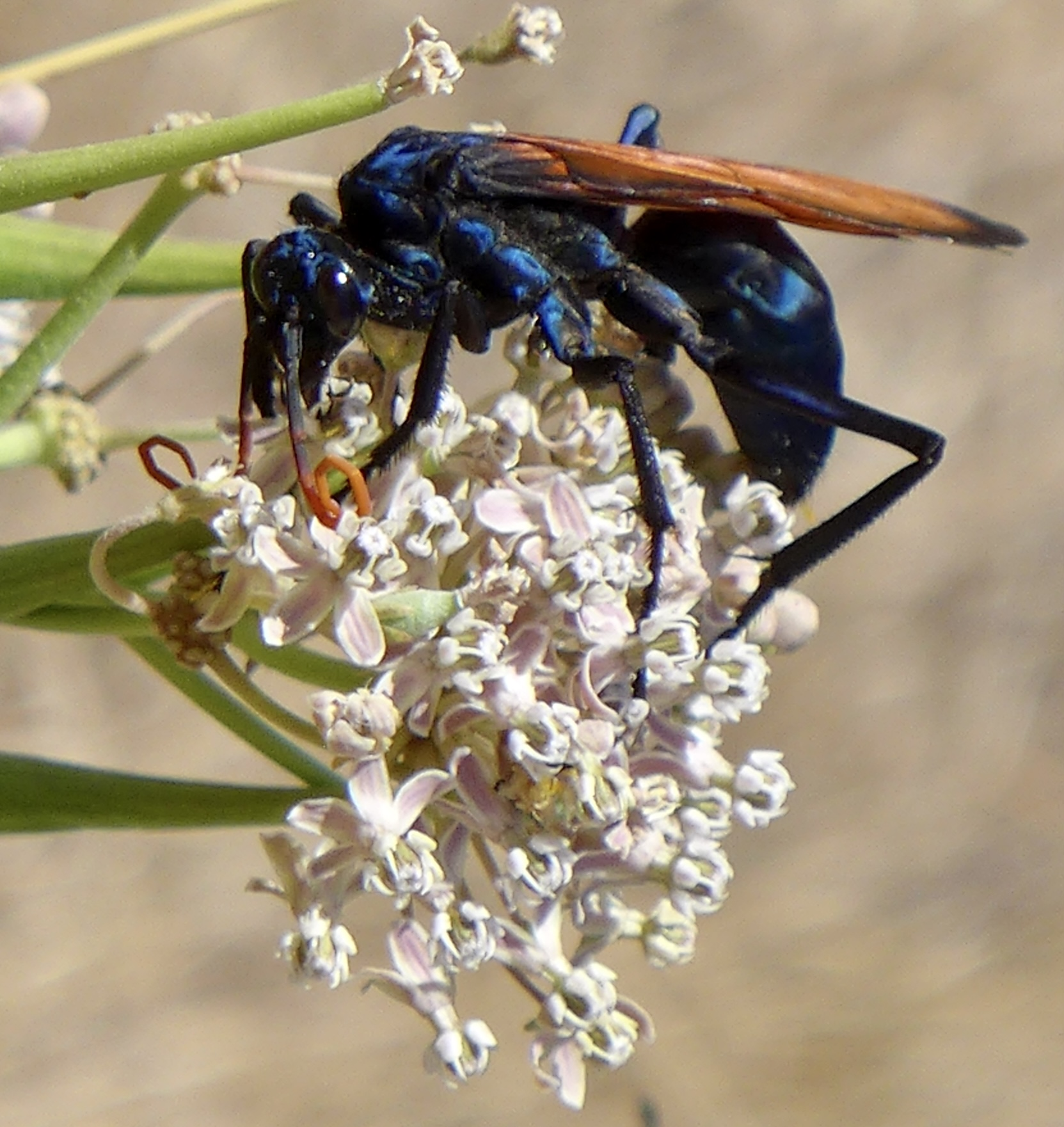
- San Benito County, California, nectaring on milkweed

Scientific classification
- Domain: Eukaryota
- Kingdom: Animalia
- Phylum: Arthropoda
- Class: Insecta
- Order: Hymenoptera
- Family: Pompilidae
- Subfamily: Pepsinae
- Genus: Pepsis
- Species: P. mildei

Binomial name
- Pepsis mildei (Stål, 1857)

Synonyms
- Pepsis hesperiæ

= Pepsis mildei =

Western Hemisphere tarantula-hawk wasp

Pepsis mildei, also known as Milde's tarantula-hawk wasp, is a species of predatory spider wasp native to the Western Hemisphere. These wasps capture live tarantulas to feed to their larva; the adults graze on flowers. Tarantula hawks generally have no meaningful predators. The wing color is black and/or orange, with rare leucistic wing coloration known in males. The wings of P. mildei are duller overall than those of Pepsis grossa or Pepsis cinnabarina. Per Edward Essig, Milde's tarantula-hawk wasp usually measures 20–30 millimeters in length and is a metallic blue-black overall, with "the antennae reddish, dusky at extreme base in the male and the basal third dusky in the female; the wings fiery red with the bases and apices dusky". In all tarantula wasps, the antennae can be used to distinguish between males and female: males are straight or gently arced, while the females have curved antennae. The lifespan of males is one to two months, while female Milde's tarantula-hawk wasps live for a longer span of time.

== Range ==
Pepsis mildei's range appears to be North America and Central America. In the U.S. this wasp is relatively common and widely distributed; it has been documented in California, Nevada, Arizona, New Mexico, Utah, Colorado, Texas, Oklahoma, Kansas, and Arkansas. P. mildei is one of four tarantula hawk species known to frequent Quitobaquito Springs at Organ Pipe Cactus National Monument in Arizona, near the U.S.–Mexico border, along with Pepsis mexicana, Pepsis chrysothemis, and Pepsis pallidolimbata.

== Taxonomy ==
This species was synonymized with a species called Pepsis hesperiæ that was described by William Hampton Patton. According to Paul David Hurd Jr. the Pepsis species angustimarginata and mildei "bear such a close morphological relationship that one is led to believe they arose from the identical ancestral stock."
