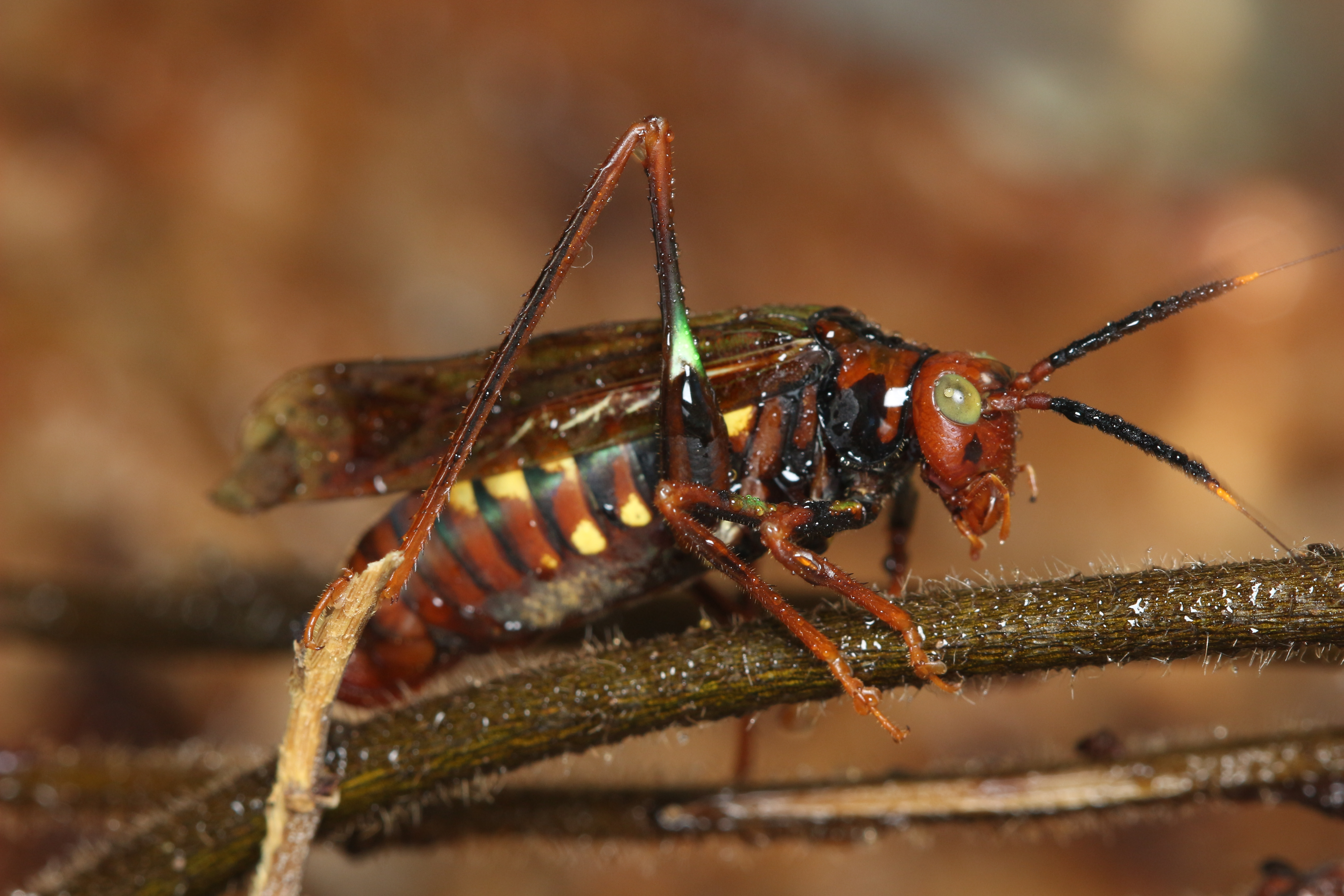
- Scaphura nigra

Scientific classification
- Domain: Eukaryota
- Kingdom: Animalia
- Phylum: Arthropoda
- Class: Insecta
- Order: Orthoptera
- Suborder: Ensifera
- Family: Tettigoniidae
- Subfamily: Phaneropterinae
- Genus: Scaphura; Kirby, 1825

= Scaphura =

Genus of cricket-like animals

Scaphura is a Neotropical genus of bush crickets in the subfamily Phaneropterinae. Some of the species within Scaphura are Batesian mimics of wasps, for example the type species, Scaphura nigra, is a polymorphic Batesian mimic of wasps of the genus Pepsis and Entypus (Pompilidae) and the potter wasps Polistes (Vespidae). The genus is restricted to South America. Another genus of Neotropical phaneropterine bush crickets, Aganacris, also are Batesian mimics of wasps.

== Species ==
The following species are included on Scaphura:

- Scaphura argentina (Hebard, 1931)
- Scaphura conspurcata Brunner von Wattenwyl, 1878
- Scaphura denuda Guérin-Méneville & Percheron, 1836
- Scaphura edwardsii Westwood, 1828
- Scaphura elegans (Serville, 1838)
- Scaphura fasciata Brunner von Wattenwyl, 1878
- Scaphura infuscata Brunner von Wattenwyl, 1878
- Scaphura lefebvrei (Brullé, 1835)
- Scaphura marginata (Walker, 1869)
- Scaphura nigra (Thunberg, 1824)
- Scaphura obscurata (Stoll, 1813)
