= Mydas xanthopterus =

Scientific classification
- Kingdom: Animalia
- Phylum: Arthropoda
- Class: Insecta
- Order: Diptera
- Family: Mydidae
- Subfamily: Mydinae
- Tribe: Mydini
- Genus: Mydas
- Species: M. xanthopterus

Binomial name
- Mydas xanthopterus (Loew, 1866)

Synonyms
- Midas xanthopterus Loew, 1866; Mydas lavatus Gerstaecker, 1868

Species of fly

Mydas xanthopterus is a species of mydas flies in the family Mydidae.

Mydas xanthopterus occur in North America (Mexico and the United States). They resemble red-winged Pepsis species and are possibly Batesian mimics. They occur in sympatry with Pepsis grossa.
