= Aphonopelma hollyi =

Scientific classification
- Kingdom: Animalia
- Phylum: Arthropoda
- Subphylum: Chelicerata
- Class: Arachnida
- Order: Araneae
- Infraorder: Mygalomorphae
- Family: Theraphosidae
- Genus: Aphonopelma
- Species: A. hollyi

Binomial name
- Aphonopelma hollyi Smith, 1995

Species of spider

Aphonopelma hollyi, also known as the Lubbock gold tarantula, is considered by some sources to be a species of tarantula native to Texas in the United States. Described in 1995, the scientific name honors the 1950s rock-and-roll singer Buddy Holly. Other sources suggest spiders given this name are actually Aphonopelma hentzi.

== Taxonomy ==
The species was described in 1995, based on a single adult male specimen from Lubbock, Texas. The holotype (i.e. the specimen on which the description was based) has been lost. A 2016 monograph of the genus Aphonopelma in the United States suggests that the specimen was actually Aphonopelma hentzi, but in the absence of the holotype, treats Aphonopelma hollyi as a nomen dubium (i.e. a doubtful name). Based on morphology, A. hollyi was considered to be closely related to a group of Aphonopelma species including A. hentzi. A study of DNA also suggested a close relationship to A. hentzi, in accordance with the suggestion that the holotype was actually this species.

== Etymology ==
Aphonopelma hollyi was described as a new species by arachnologist Andrew M. Smith in 1995, based on a single male specimen collected in Lubbock, Texas in 1981, and housed at Oklahoma State University. Smith named the new species after Buddy Holly, who was born in Lubbock.

== Description ==
Measurements of males are known from the male holotype specimen, with a body length of 43 mm (1.7 in), and a carapace of 18x17 mm. The longest legs (the fourth or rearmost pair) are 60 mm long, and the jaws are 5 mm long. The pedipalps bear four spines, and the first walking legs bear two. The color in alcohol preserved specimens is brown with gold or bronze hairs on the carapace, and light reddish brown hairs on the legs and abdomen. Female measurements were not included with the original description, but attain masses exceeding 10 grams.

== Distribution and habitat ==
Lubbock gold tarantulas are known from Lubbock and Briscoe counties, in Northern Texas, and occur in mixed grassland and scrub woodland among grass hillsides.

== Behavior ==
Like other Aphonopelma species, A. hollyi juveniles and adults construct burrows. In a 14-month study conducted in the mid 2000s, A. hollyi became the first wild spiders studied with implanted passive integrated transponder (PIT) tags, which were inserted into the body to allow for redetection. This study found high rates of burrow abandonment over the period, with monthly precipitation being the dominant predictor for abandonment, although it is unclear if the annual patterns are typical of the species or simply local responses to areas prone to flooding. A separate study using radio telemetry in July, 2007, indicated adults spent up to 96% of their time in burrows, and when exited moved only short distances (no more than 40 cm (16 in) from burrow) before returning.

== See also ==
- List of spiders of Texas
- List of organisms named after famous people (born 1925–1949)
