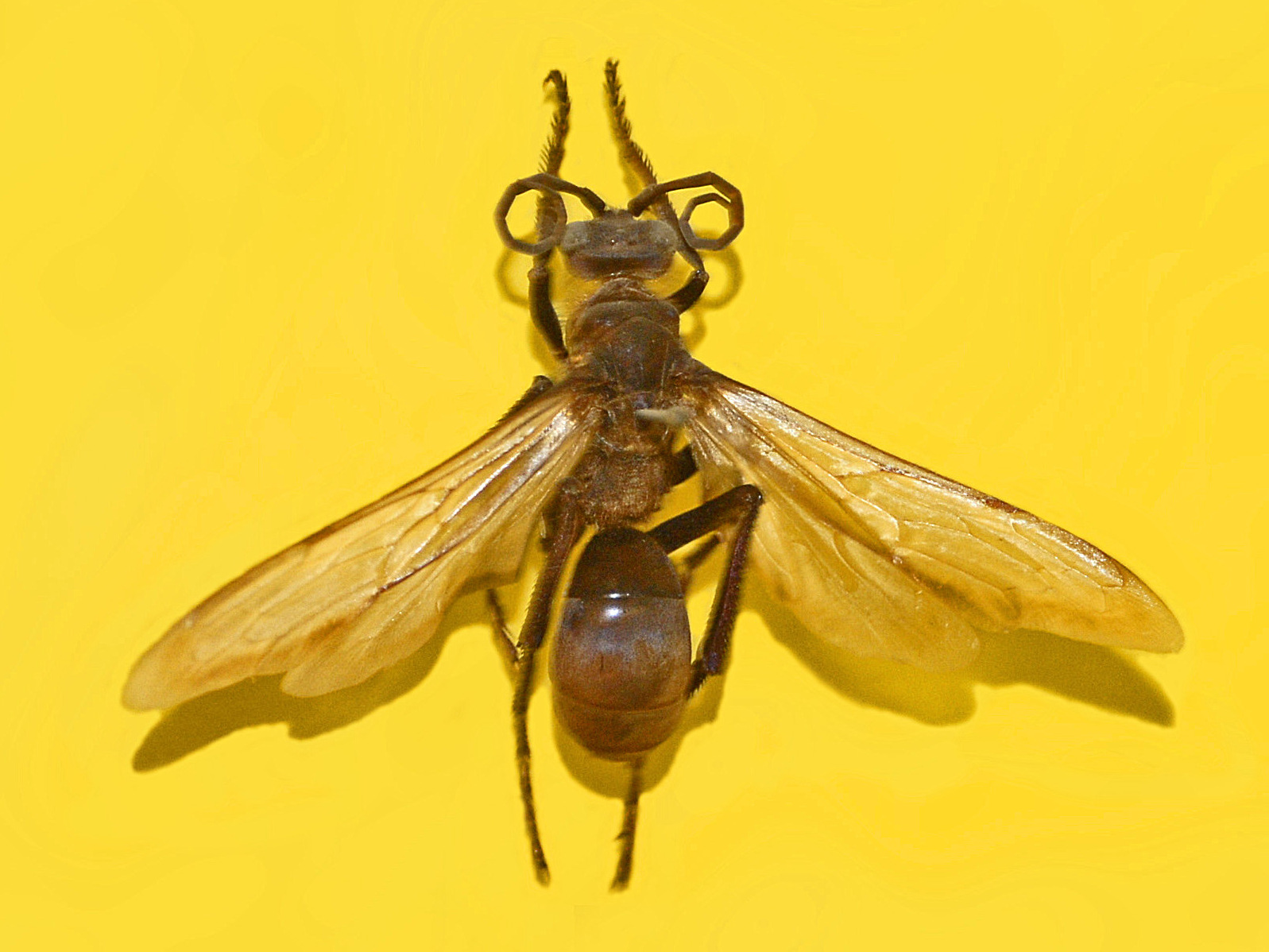
- Pepsis albocincta museum specimen

Scientific classification
- Domain: Eukaryota
- Kingdom: Animalia
- Phylum: Arthropoda
- Class: Insecta
- Order: Hymenoptera
- Family: Pompilidae
- Genus: Pepsis
- Species: P. albocincta

Binomial name
- Pepsis albocincta Smith, 1855

Synonyms
- Pepsis abrupta Brèthes, 1908; Pepsis ameghinoi Brèthes, 1908; Pepsis annaeerdmuthae Lucas, 1919; Pepsis bicarinata Mocsáry ms in Lucas, 1895; Pepsis chrysothorax Brèthes, 1908; Pepsis copelloi Brèthes, 1914; Pepsis echeverriai Brèthes, 1908; Pepsis erythrocera Brèthes, 1914; Pepsis ichesi Brèthes, 1908; Pepsis lycaste Banks, 1946

= Pepsis albocincta =

Species of wasp

Pepsis albocincta is a species of spider wasps belonging to the family Pompilidae.

These wasps are also called tarantula hawks, as they usually hunt tarantulas, similarly to many species in the genus Hemipepsis.

== Description ==
P. albocincta can reach a length of 25–55 mm (0.98–2.17 in). Body and legs are black with a weak blue-green-violet sheen. Antennae are black with orange apical segments. Wings may be amber to deep orange or dark brown or black with a blue-violet sheen.

== Distribution ==
They are present in Argentina, Brazil, Bolivia, Paraguay, and Uruguay.
