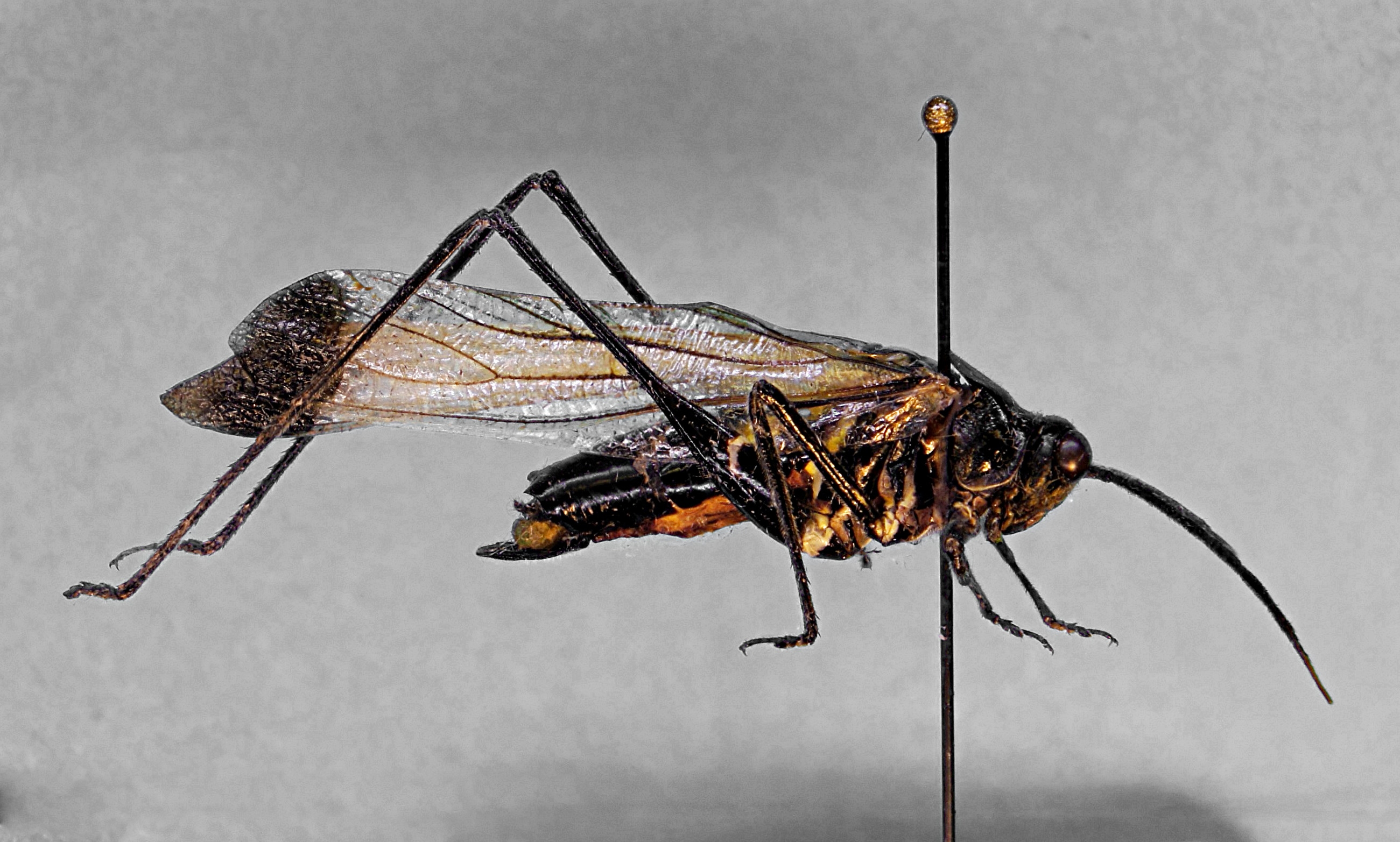
- Pinned male Aganacris nitida (Bavarian State Collection of Zoology, Munich) from Peru
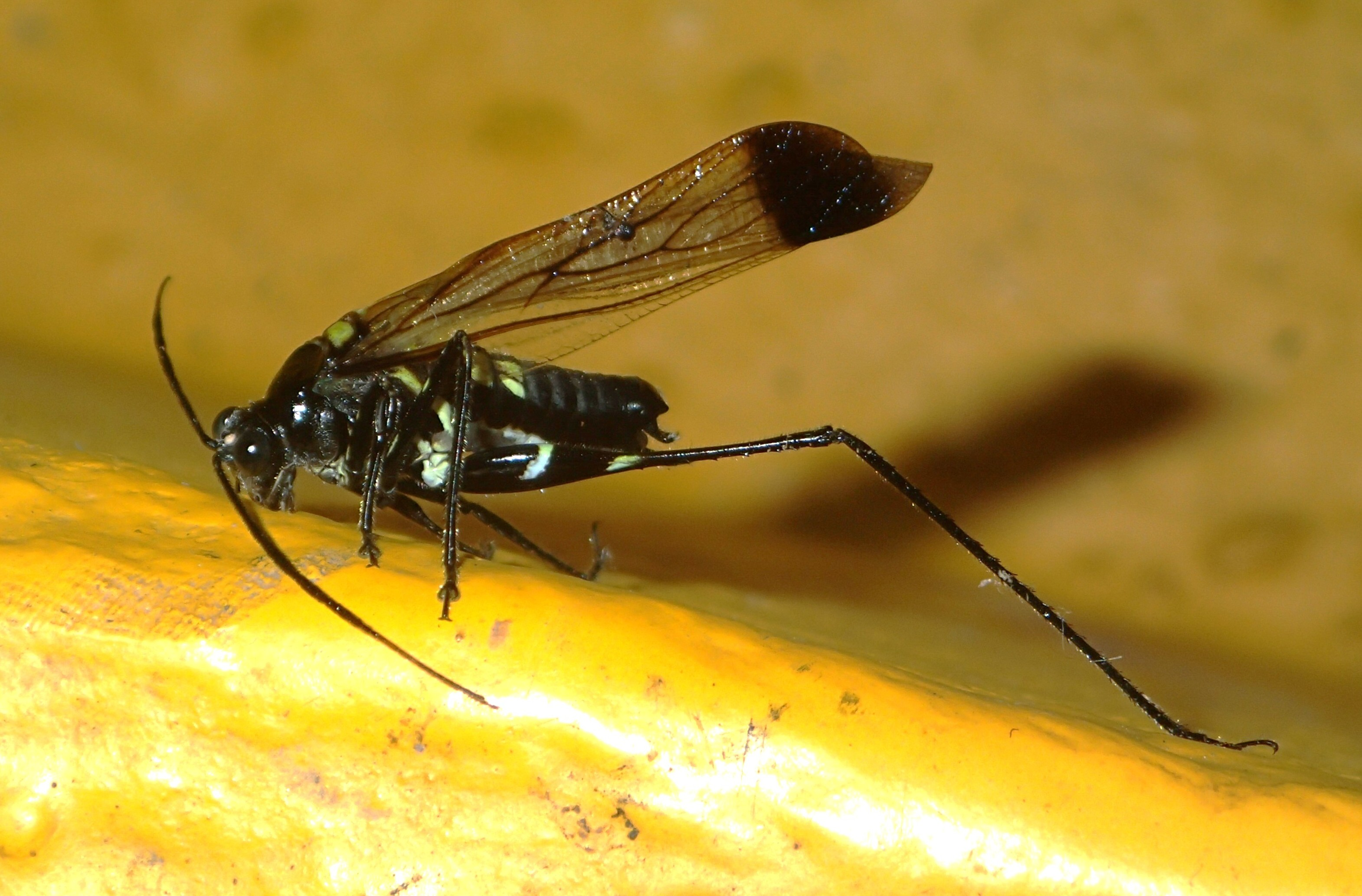
- Male Aganacris nitida from Ecuador

Scientific classification
- Kingdom: Animalia
- Phylum: Arthropoda
- Class: Insecta
- Order: Orthoptera
- Suborder: Ensifera
- Family: Tettigoniidae
- Subfamily: Phaneropterinae
- Genus: Aganacris; Walker, 1871

Type species
- Aganacris nitida (Perty, 1832)

Species
- Aganacris velutina; Aganacris sphex; Aganacris nitida

= Aganacris =

Genus of insects

Aganacris is a genus of leaf katydids in the tribe Scudderiini. They are known for mimicking wasps of the families Pompilidae and Sphecidae and typically have orange/black coloration. Hymenopteran models for Batesian mimicry vary across sex and developmental stages.

== Anatomy & morphology ==
Aganacris are typically black and shiny with orange or yellow highlights. They typically average between 29 and 37 mm long. Some have colorful spots on their legs and antennae. This coloration contributes to Batesian mimicry of wasps which repels visual predators and facilitates a diurnal period of foraging activity (rare in most Phanaeopterins). There is strong sexual dimorphism: Nickle et al., 2012 suggests that due to the larger size of females and the presence of protruding ovipositors, females face selective pressure to mimic different wasps than males. Juveniles mimic ants or velvet ants.

== Behavior ==
During the day, they typically make fast and jerking movements including rapid antennal probing, abdominal bouncing, and shifting their wings like foraging wasps. During the night they move more slowly and less like wasps. A. velutina have been observed to only sing between 3 - 5 AM which is a period of inactivity for leaf-gleaning bats. They were also found to communicate with substrate borne vibrations twice as often as with stridulatory signals. Aganacris mainly feed on leaves.

== Distribution ==
Aganacris are a neotropical group and have been collected across rain forests from Honduras to Bolivia. (Inaturalist observations, as of Oct 2025) Typically they are found on leaves from understory to mid canopy heights.

== Mimicry models ==
Currently theorized models for mimicry: Hemipepsis mexicana for male A. velutina (prev. A. insectivora), Erimnophila wasps for A. sphex and male A. nitida (prev. A. pseudosphex) Also possibly Pepsis mexicana for male A. nitida. Juveniles are thought to be myrmecomorphic.

== Taxonomy ==
Aganacris was originally coined from specimens in the British museum representing Aganacris micans which was later revised to be Scaphura nitida and then Aganacris nitida. Scaphura being the other genus of wasp mimicking Phanaeopterins which occur primarily in open savannah.

On resurrection of the genus name Aganacris, S. sphex, S. nitida, and S. velutina were all re named as A. sphex, A. nitida, and A. velutina. A. pseudosphex and A. insectavora were described in the same publication.

A. pseudosphex and A. sphex were later lumped into A. nitida and A. insectavora was lumped into A. velutina. Grant's (1958) descriptions of them had been confused by sexual dimorphism as A. sphex, A. velutina and A. nitida were described from females and A. pseudosphex and A. insectivora from males.

Nickle (2012) lumped them based on observations of interspecies mating between A. nitida and A. pseudosphex - behavior which have never been published between Orthopterans in the wild, coupled with morphological evidence.

Eventually, Near Infrared Spectroscopy (NIRs) was used to differentiate cuticular chemical composition between the members of this complex and settled on the three currently accepted species.

Year	Author	Action
1869	Walker & Gray	Aganacris erected from museum specimens: A. micans.
1904	Kirby	Species now placed in Scaphura based on external morphology.
1958	Grant	Multiple male and female morphs described as separate species, genus restored with five species: A. sphex, A. nitida, A. velutina, A. pseudosphex, and A. insectavora.
2012	Nickle	Synonymies revised; sexual dimorphism recognized; five species becomes two: A. nitida, A. velutina
2018	da Silva Sovano et al	NIRS analysis supports three-species complex and supports genus validity: A. nitida, A. velutina, A. Sphex

== Species ==
This genus contains three species.

- Aganacris nitida (Perty, 1832)
- Aganacris sphex (Rehn, 1918)
- Aganacris velutina (Kirby, 1906)
