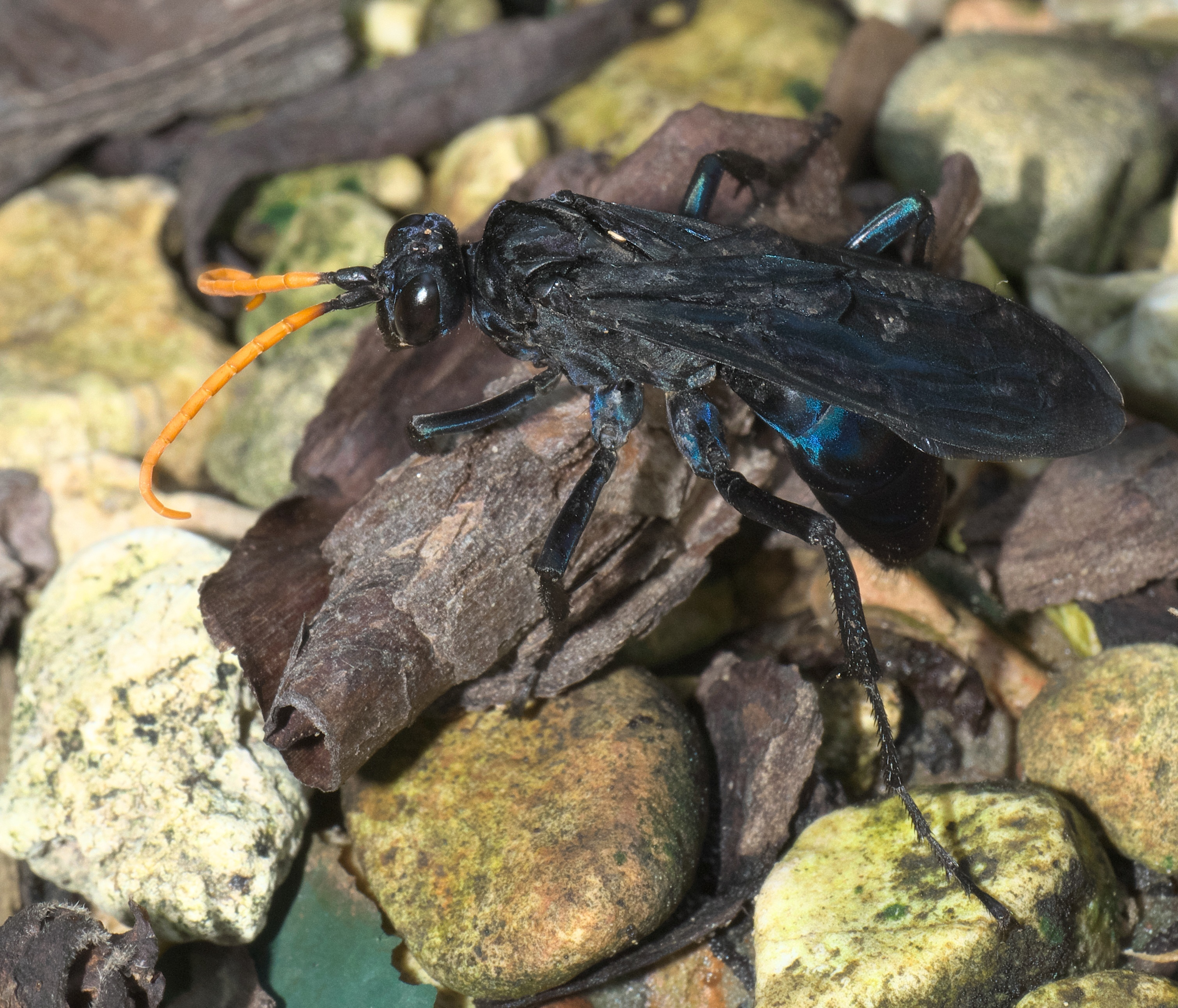

Scientific classification
- Kingdom: Animalia
- Phylum: Arthropoda
- Class: Insecta
- Order: Hymenoptera
- Family: Pompilidae
- Genus: Pepsis
- Species: P. menechma

Binomial name
- Pepsis menechma Lepeletier, 1845

Synonyms
- Pepsis elegans Lepeletier, 1845; Pepsis dubitata Cresson, 1867; Pepsis prismatica Smith, 1855; Pepsis advena Mocsáry, 1885; Pepsis cinctipennis Mocsáry, 1885; Pepsis guatemalensis Cameron, 1893; Pepsis nestor Mocsáry, 1894; Pepsis nigricornis Mocsáry, 1894; Pepsis auranticornis Lucas, 1895; Pepsis cerberus Lucas, 1895; Pepsis concolor Lucas, 1895; Pepsis euchroma Lucas, 1895; Pepsis fruhstorferi Lucas, 1895; Pepsis mordax Lucas, 1895; Pepsis nigrocincta Lucas, 1895; Pepsis inermis Fox, 1898; Pepsis cultrata Brèthes, 1908; Pepsis janira Brèthes, 1908; Pepsis roberti Brèthes, 1908; Pepsis novitia Banks, 1921

= Pepsis menechma =

Species of wasp

Pepsis menechma, the elegant tarantula hawk, is a species of spider wasp in the family Pompilidae, widely distributed from North America through South America.

== Taxonomy and phylogeny ==
In 2005, Vardy synonymized what had been 18 valid species under the resurrected name of P. menechma, thus treating a single widespread, transamerican species with numerous very different color forms over its range.
