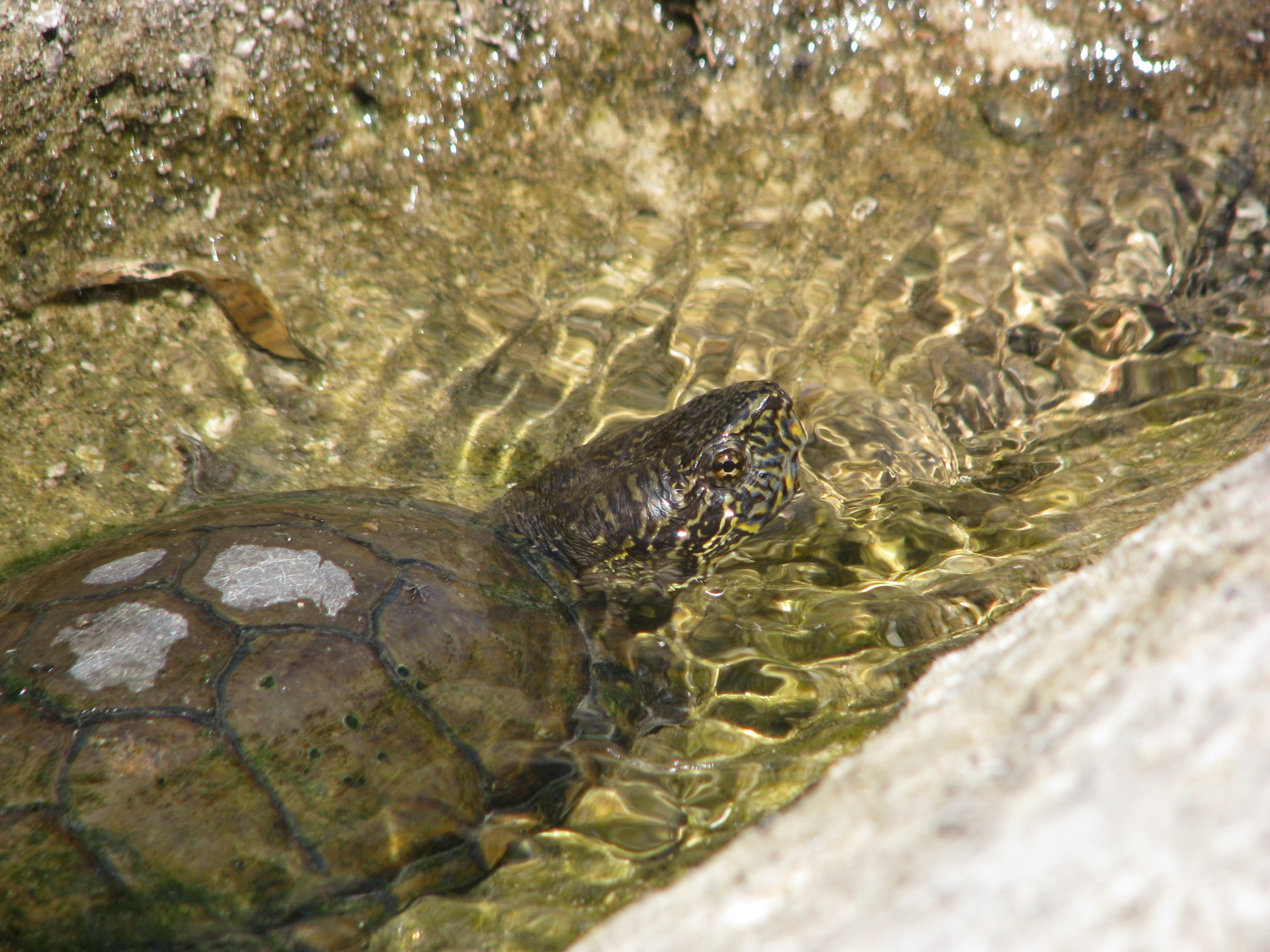
- Male
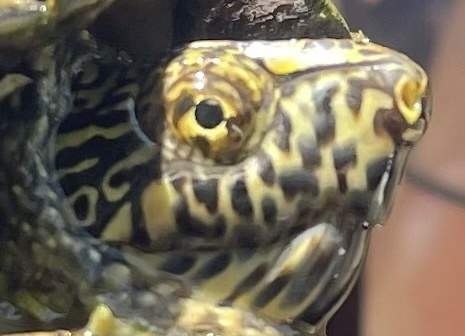
- In Sonora, Mexico

Conservation status
- Vulnerable (IUCN 3.1)

Scientific classification
- Kingdom: Animalia
- Phylum: Chordata
- Class: Reptilia
- Order: Testudines
- Suborder: Cryptodira
- Family: Kinosternidae
- Genus: Kinosternon
- Species: K. sonoriense

Binomial name
- Kinosternon sonoriense Le Conte, 1854

Synonyms
- Kinosternon sonoriense sonoriense: Kinosternum sonoriense LeConte, 1854; Kinosternon sonoriense Gray, 1856; Cinosternum sonoriense Agassiz, 1857; Thyrosternum sonoriense Agassiz, 1857; Kinosternum henrici LeConte, 1860; Thyrosternum henrici Troschel, 1860; Cinosternon henrici Strauch, 1862; Cinosternon sonoriense Strauch, 1862; Thylosternum sonoriense Müller, 1865; Swanka henricii Gray, 1870 (ex errore); Cinosternum henrici Cope, 1875; Swanka henrici Boulenger, 1889; Kinosternon sonoriensis Bogert & Oliver, 1945 (ex errore); Kinosternon sonorensis Weise, 1962 (ex errore); Kinosternon seonoriense Berry & Shine, 1980 (ex errore); Kinosternon sonoriense sonoriense Iverson, 1981; Kinosternon sonorense sonorense Rogner, 1996 (ex errore); Kinosternon sonoriense longifemorale: Kinosternon sonoriense longifemorale Iverson, 1981; Kinosternon sonorense longifemorale Rogner, 1996

= Sonora mud turtle =

Species of turtle

The Sonora mud turtle (Kinosternon sonoriense) is a species of turtle in the Kinosternidae family. Its common names include the Desert Mud Turtle and Casquito de Sonora in Spanish. It is found in Mexico and the United States. One subspecies, the Sonoyta mud turtle (Kinosternon sonoriense longifemorale), is currently recognized.

== Distribution ==
The Sonora mud turtle's range historically extended to the lower Colorado River Basin of Southwestern Arizona, southeastern California, and likely Baja California and Southern Nevada. It currently only exists in the Mexican states of Chihuahua and Sonora and the United States states of Arizona and New Mexico.

== Habitat ==
Sonora mud turtles live in various bodies of water such as streams, shallow pools, and even large puddles with depths of 20 to 300 cm (7.9 to 118 inches), in arid mountain and desert areas between elevations of 305 to 1,525 m (1,000 to 5,003 ft).

== Behavior ==
Wild Sonora mud turtles estivate in vegetation, soil, or other organic matter 64% of the time, and in boulder crevices 36% of the time. Studies have shown turtles can remain dormant on land for 11 to 34 days during drought conditions.

== Conservation ==
he U.S. Fish and Wildlife Service has listed the Sonoyta mud turtle as endangered under the Endangered Species Act in 2017 and designated critical habitat in 2019. Today there are only five known populations: one in Arizona and four in Sonora, Mexico. The subspecies Kinosternon sonoriense longifemorale is also listed as endemic and in danger of extinction under Mexico's Norma Oficial Mexicana. In 2023 the IUCN listed the Sonora mud turtle as vulnerable under criteria A4c.

The species is vulnerable to predation by non-native species such as American Bullfrogs, Largemouth Bass, and crayfishes. In many areas its aquatic habitats have disappeared due to water diversions and groundwater pumping.

The only U.S. population of the subspecies Sonoyta mud turtle, around 150 individuals, lives in a small spring-fed pond at Quitobaquito Springs in Organ Pipe Cactus National Monument, just over 100 yards from the U.S.-Mexico border. Following the 2019 National Emergency Concerning the Southern Border of the United States (Proclamation 9844) the Secretary of Homeland Security issued waivers for all legal activities in the vicinity of the Sonoyta mud turtle's known range. The construction of the border wall included pumping of groundwater to mix concrete sparking fears that the small ponds could dry up. Following the completion of this section of border wall in 2020 the pond had dropped 15 inches with the spring’s flow reaching an historic low of 5.5 gallons per minute. As of 2025 the population had stabilized at around 130 individuals. A captive breeding program by the Arizona-Sonora Desert Museum is considering taking up to 50 individuals to aid in recovery efforts.

== Subspecies ==
- Sonora mud turtle (subspecies) - Kinosternon sonoriense sonoriense (Le Conte, 1854)
- Sonoyta mud turtle - Kinosternon sonoriense longifemorale (Iverson, 1981)

== Gallery ==
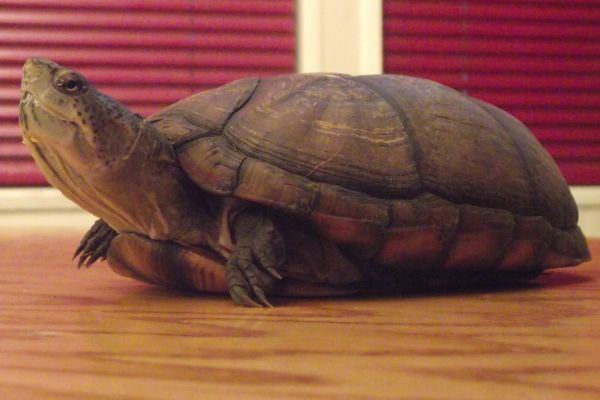
Male

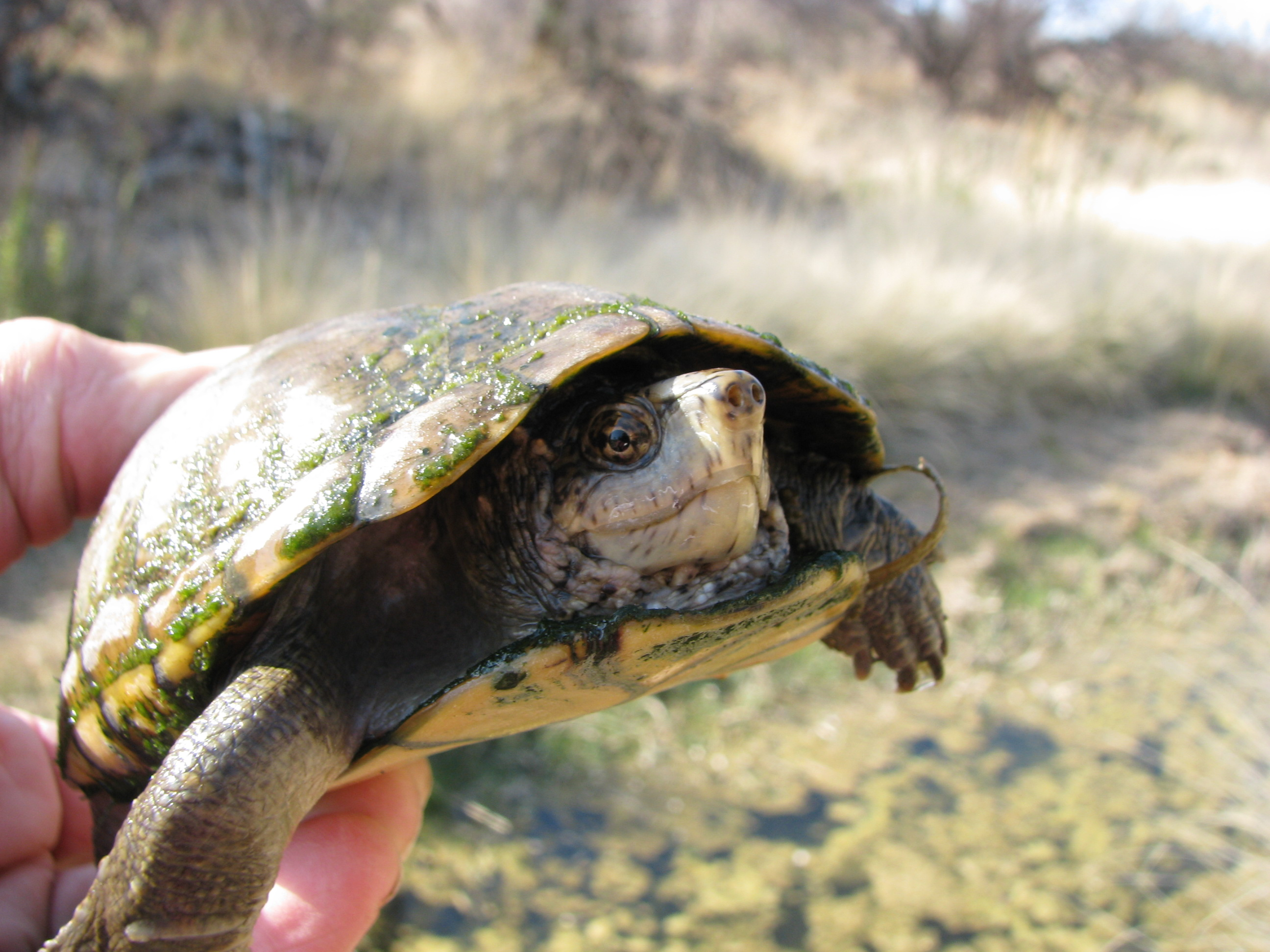
Female, Arizona

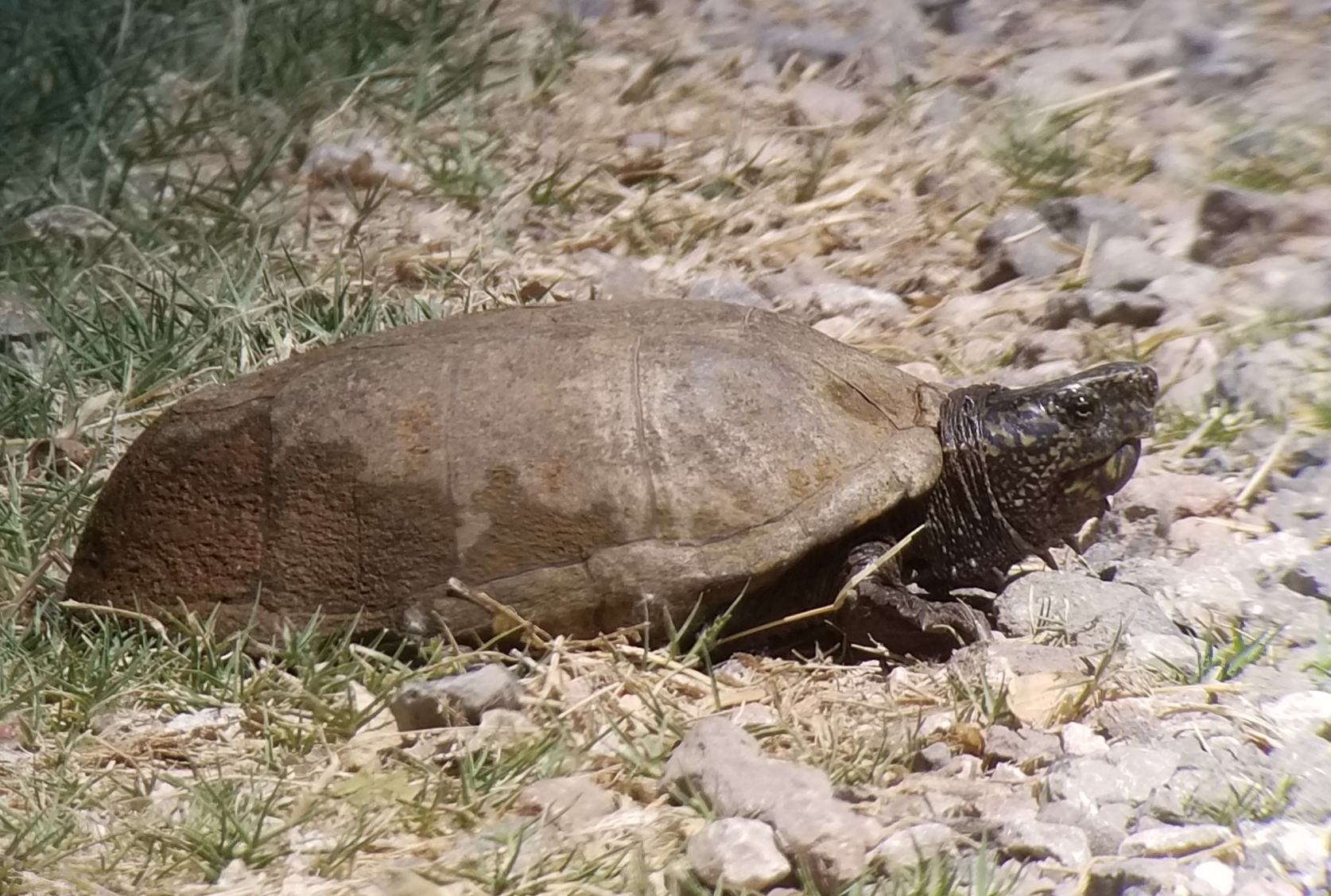
In Arizona

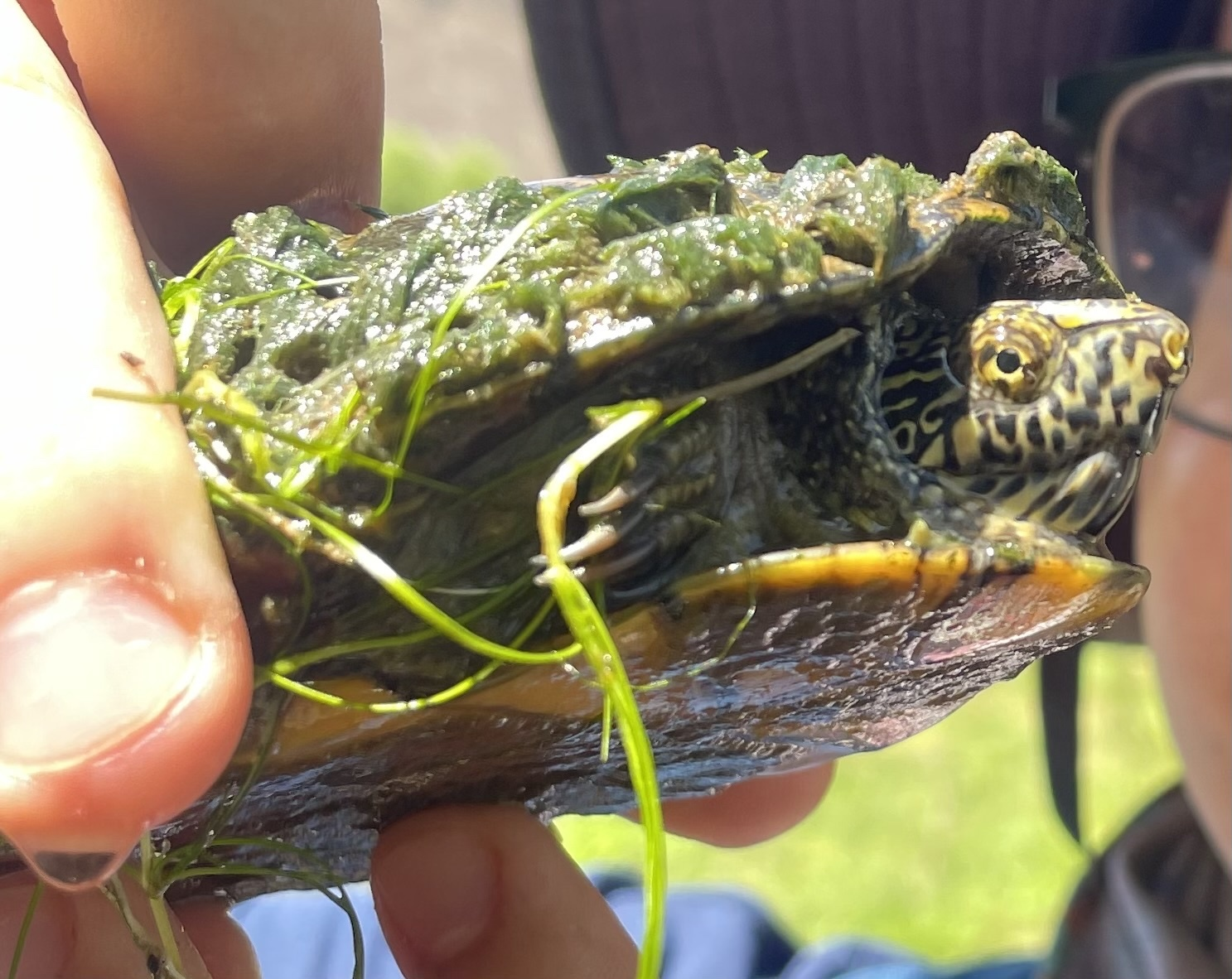
In Sonora, Mexico

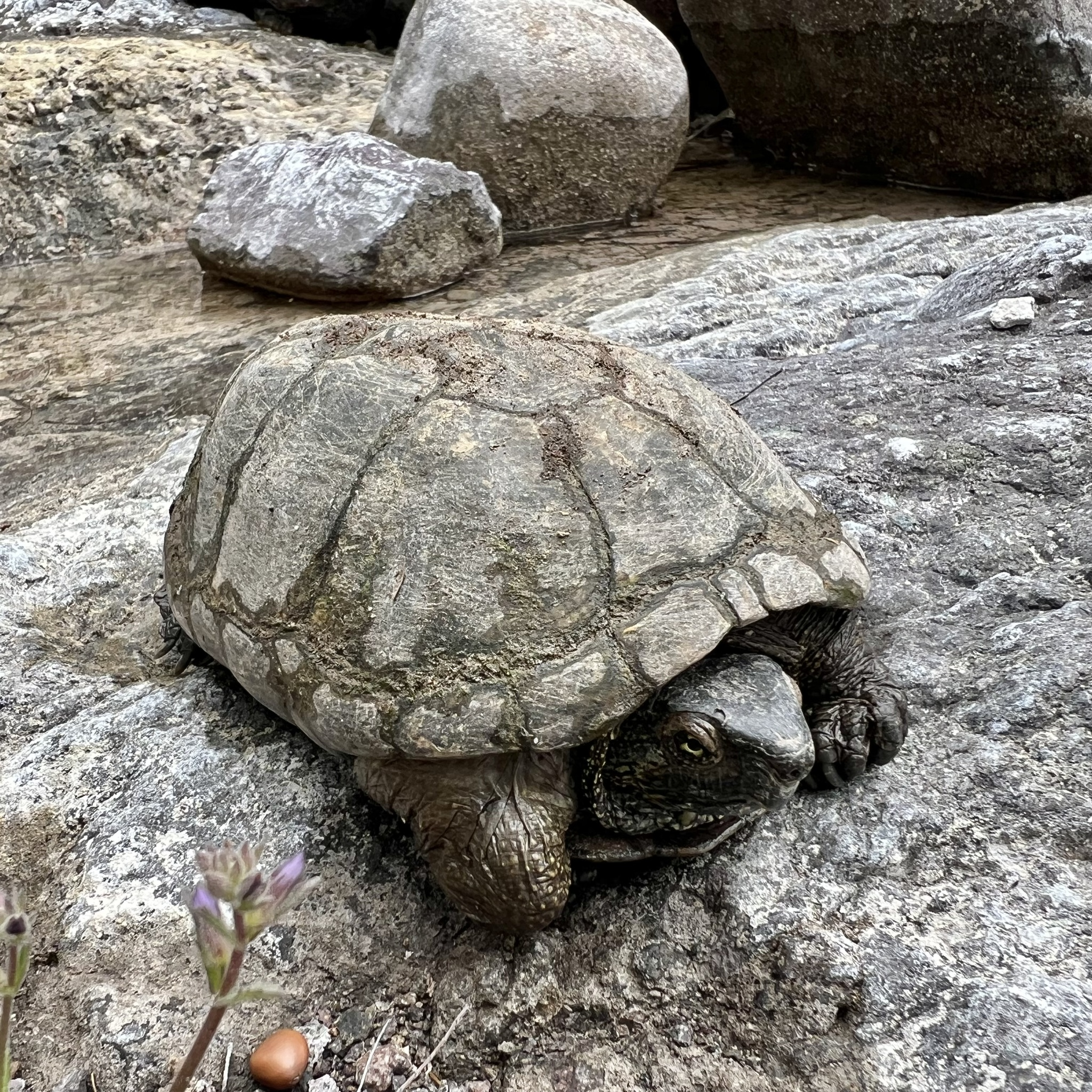
In Sonora, Mexico

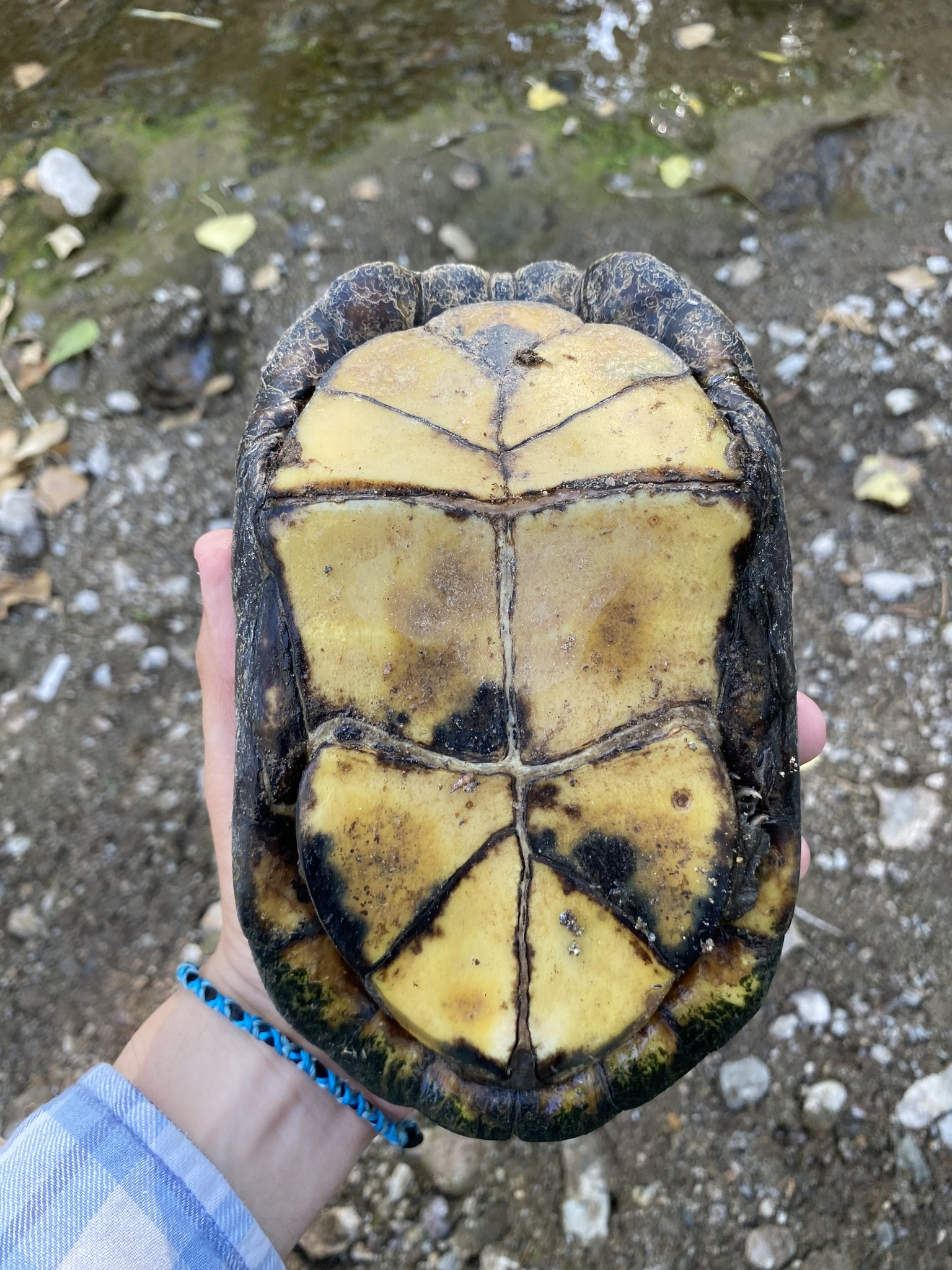
Plastron, Sonora, Mexico

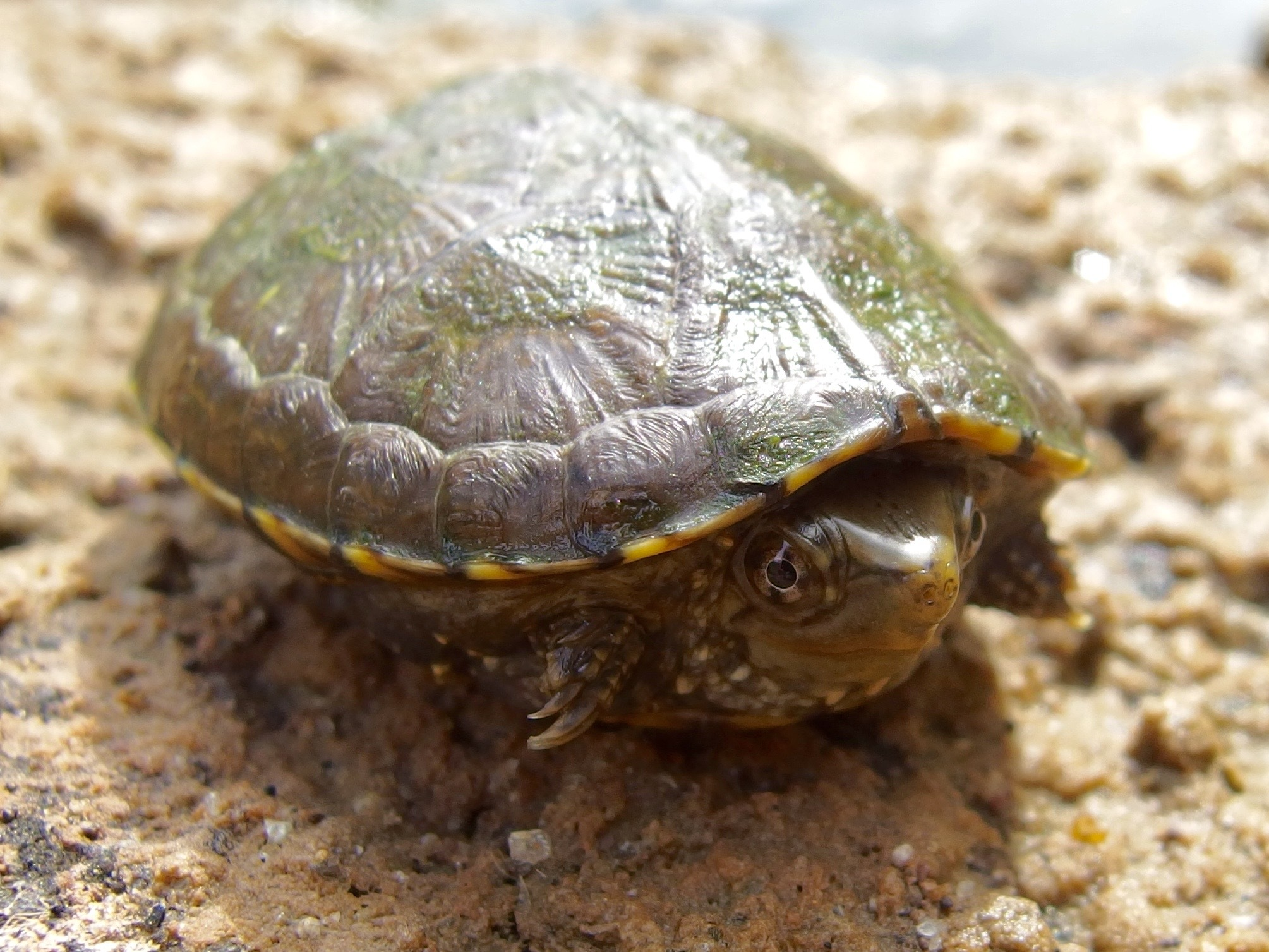
Juvenile, in Arizona

== Sources ==
- Tortoise & Freshwater Turtle Specialist Group 1996. Kinosternon sonoriense. 2006 IUCN Red List of Threatened Species. Downloaded on 29 July 2007.
- LeConte, 1854 : Description of four new species of Kinosternum. Proceedings of the Academy of Natural Sciences of Philadelphia, vol. 7, p. 180–190 (integral text).
- Ligon, Db, et al. "Physiological and Behavioral Variation in Estivation among Mud Turtles ( Kinosternon Spp.)." Physiological and Biochemical Zoology., vol. 75, no. 3, 2002, pp. 283–293., https://doi.org/10.1086/342000.
- Stone, P. A. (2001). Movements and Demography of the Sonoran Mud Turtle, Kinosternon sonoriense. The Southwestern Naturalist, 46(1), 41–53. https://doi.org/10.2307/3672372
