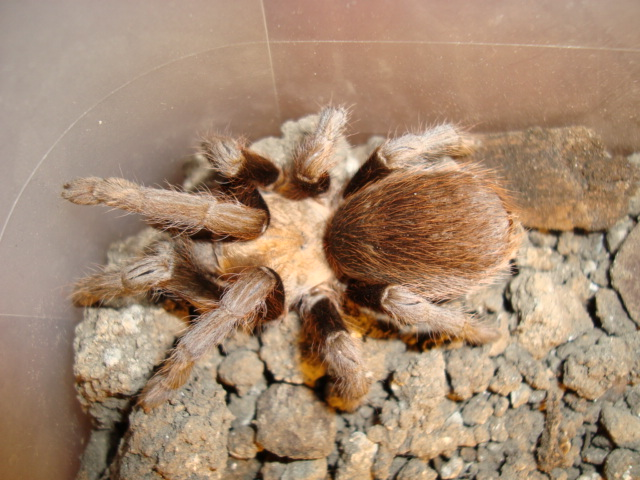

Conservation status
- Secure (NatureServe)

Scientific classification
- Kingdom: Animalia
- Phylum: Arthropoda
- Subphylum: Chelicerata
- Class: Arachnida
- Order: Araneae
- Infraorder: Mygalomorphae
- Family: Theraphosidae
- Genus: Aphonopelma
- Species: A. hentzi

Binomial name
- Aphonopelma hentzi (Girard, 1852)

Synonyms
- Aphonopelma clarki Smith, 1995; Aphonopelma coloradanum (Chamberlin, 1940); Aphonopelma echinum (Chamberlin, 1940); Aphonopelma gurleyi Smith, 1995; Aphonopelma harlingenum (Chamberlin, 1940); Aphonopelma odelli Smith, 1995; Aphonopelma waconum (Chamberlin, 1940); Aphonopelma wichitanum (Chamberlin, 1940)

= Texas brown tarantula =

Species of spider

The Texas brown tarantula, Aphonopelma hentzi, also known as the Oklahoma brown tarantula or Missouri tarantula, is one of the most common species of tarantula living in the Southern United States today. Texas brown tarantulas can grow to leg spans in excess of 10 cm (4 in), and weigh more than 85 g (3 oz) as adults. Their bodies are dark brown, though shades may vary between individual tarantulas. The colors are more distinct after a molt, as with many arthropods. Males develop black legs with a copper colored carapace. Immature and males come in many shades of brown with considerable variation in greys and reds.

== Lifecycle ==
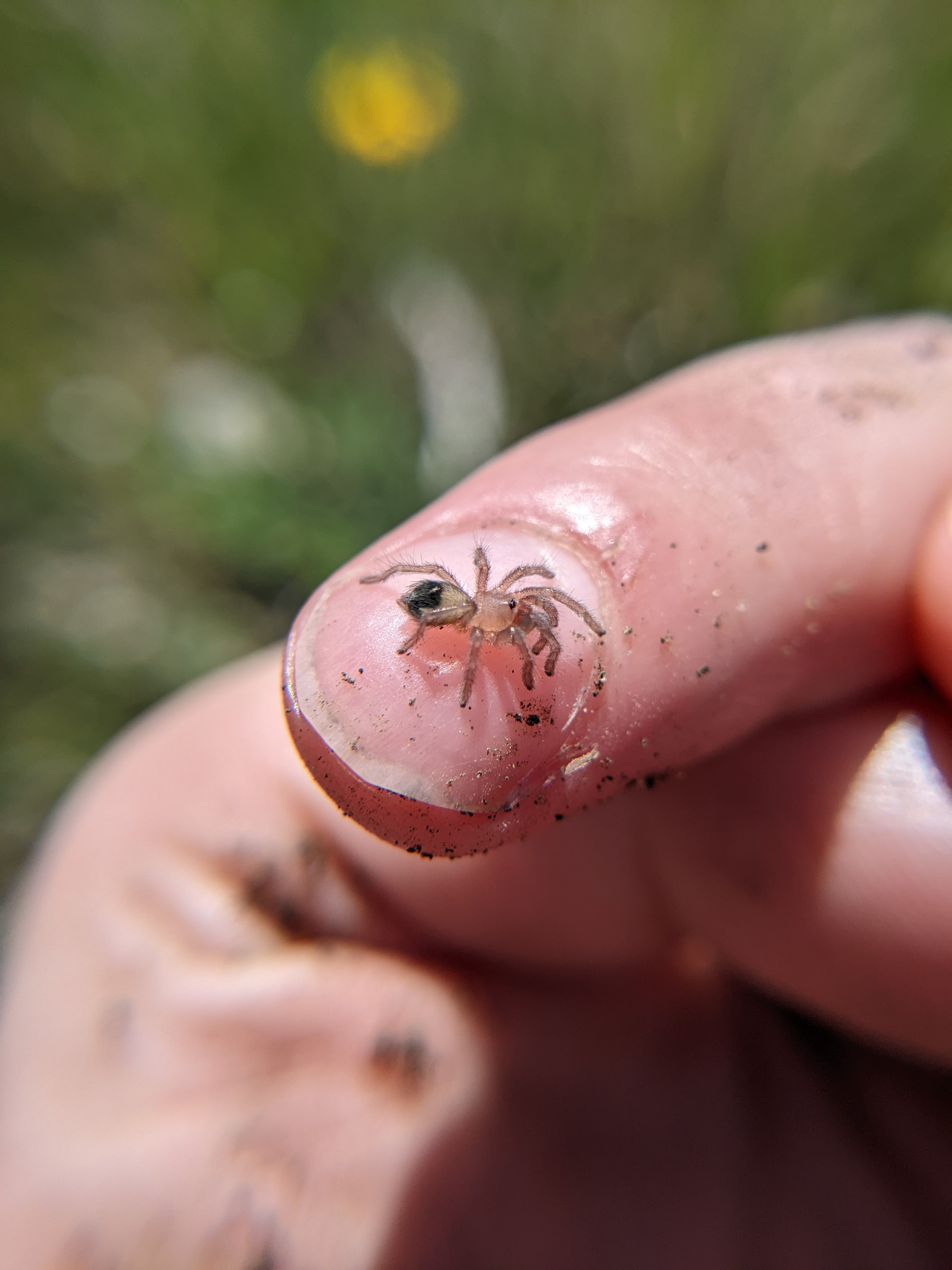
An A. hentzi spiderling sits on a human index finger.

A female of A. hentzi can lay between approximately 200 to 1,000 eggs. The eggs are positioned securely in a web shaped like a hammock, which remains in her burrow, and guarded by her. Eggs hatch in 45 to 60 days. Once spiderlings leave the egg sac, they often stay with the female for several days before dispersing to make their own burrows.

Females have been known to live up to 40 years. However, no studies have lasted this long, so their lifespan may be longer. Males rarely live over a year after they have matured.

Males mature and travel looking for females, typically in the fall. They have been documented travelling as far as 1.7 km.

== Defense ==
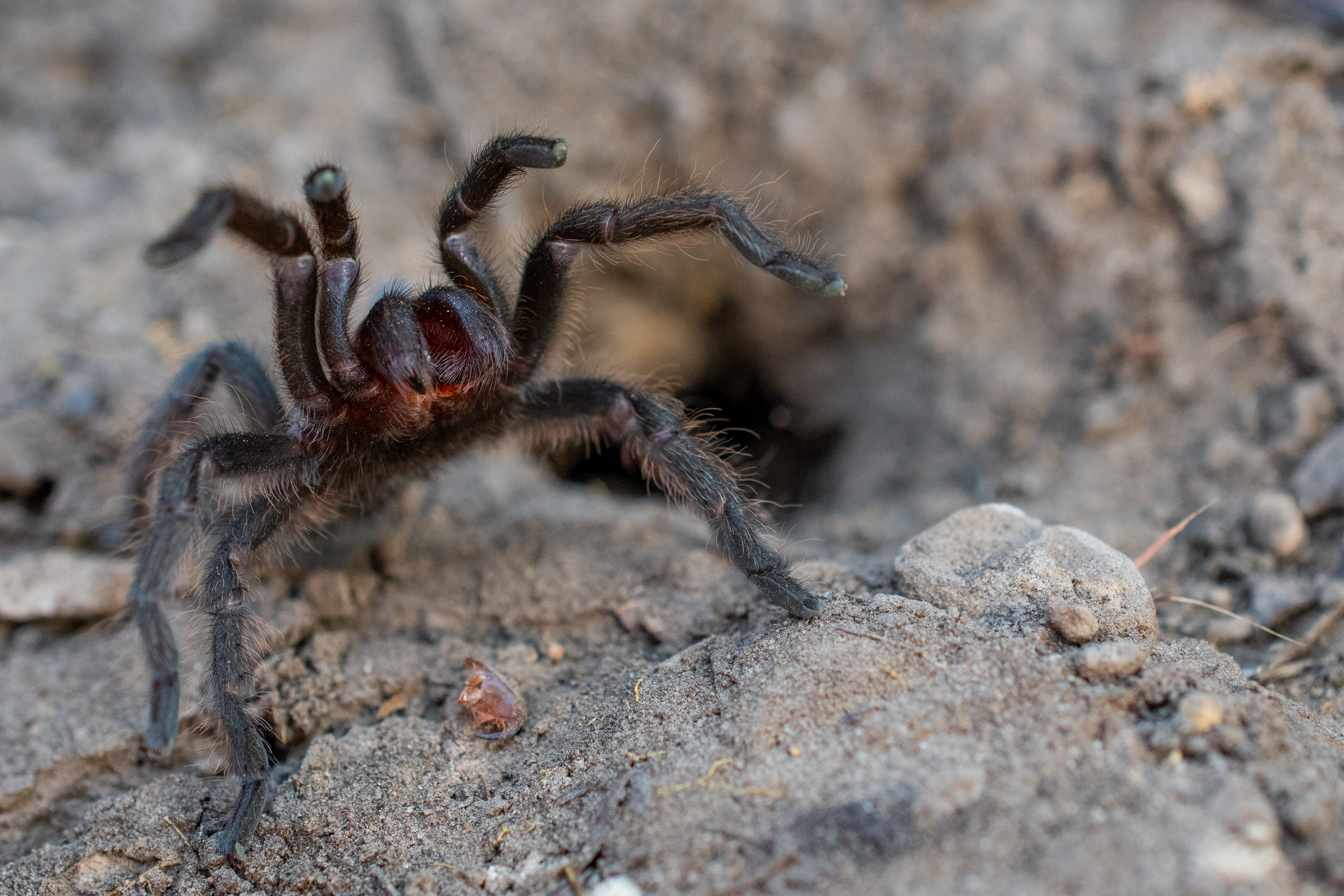
A juvenile A. hentzi in a threat pose.

A. hentzi is a rather docile and nonaggressive species. When disturbed, like most other tarantulas, A. hentzi maneuvers itself to a stance on its hind legs and raises its front legs in a threatening manner. Additionally, A. hentzi and most other tarantulas found in the Americas have small, coarse, brown or black urticating hairs on their abdomens that they kick in the direction of whatever they may feel threatens them. It is the main species preyed upon by the tarantula hawk, Pepsis grossa, in areas where the two species overlap.

A. hentzi has been documented sharing their burrows with narrow-mouthed toads (Gastrophryne spp). The toads receive protection from predators like snakes, and eat small invertebrates in the tarantula's burrow. but ignore newly hatched spiderlings. This may be a mutualism where the toads receive protection from predators and the tarantulas' spiderlings are protected from small invertebrates eaten by the toads.

Bites from the Texas brown tarantula, as with all New World tarantulas, are generally not a serious harm to humans except in the case of an allergic reaction. Due to the large size of their fangs, the puncture wound from a bite can also be painful and lead to secondary infection if not properly treated.

== Distribution ==
The distribution of A. hentzi includes Colorado, Kansas, Missouri, New Mexico, Arizona, Oklahoma, Arkansas, Texas, and Louisiana in the U.S. The species has also been documented in the northern parts of Mexico, extending along the New Mexico and Texas borders.

== Habitat ==
A. hentzi is a terrestrial species commonly found in grasslands, burrowed underground, or using logs, stones, or other small animals' abandoned dens as their homes and feeding grounds. Texas brown tarantulas use their spinnerets to line the entrance of their shelters with webbing to detect passing prey.
