= Quitobaquito Hills =

Landform in Pima County, Arizona

Quitobaquito Hills is a range of hills in Pima County, Arizona. The name is of Tohono O'odham - Spanish origin meaning 'house ring spring'. Its tallest summit is an unnamed hill 1,880 feet (570 meters) that overlooks Cipriano Pass to the east. The range trends northwest from near the Mexican border at 31°56′24″N 113°00′47″W, east of Quitobaquito Springs northwestward out of the Organ Pipe Cactus National Monument to the tallest summit then turns westward to the vicinity of 31°59′55″N 113°06′12″W, south of the eastern end of the Agua Dulce Mountains.
