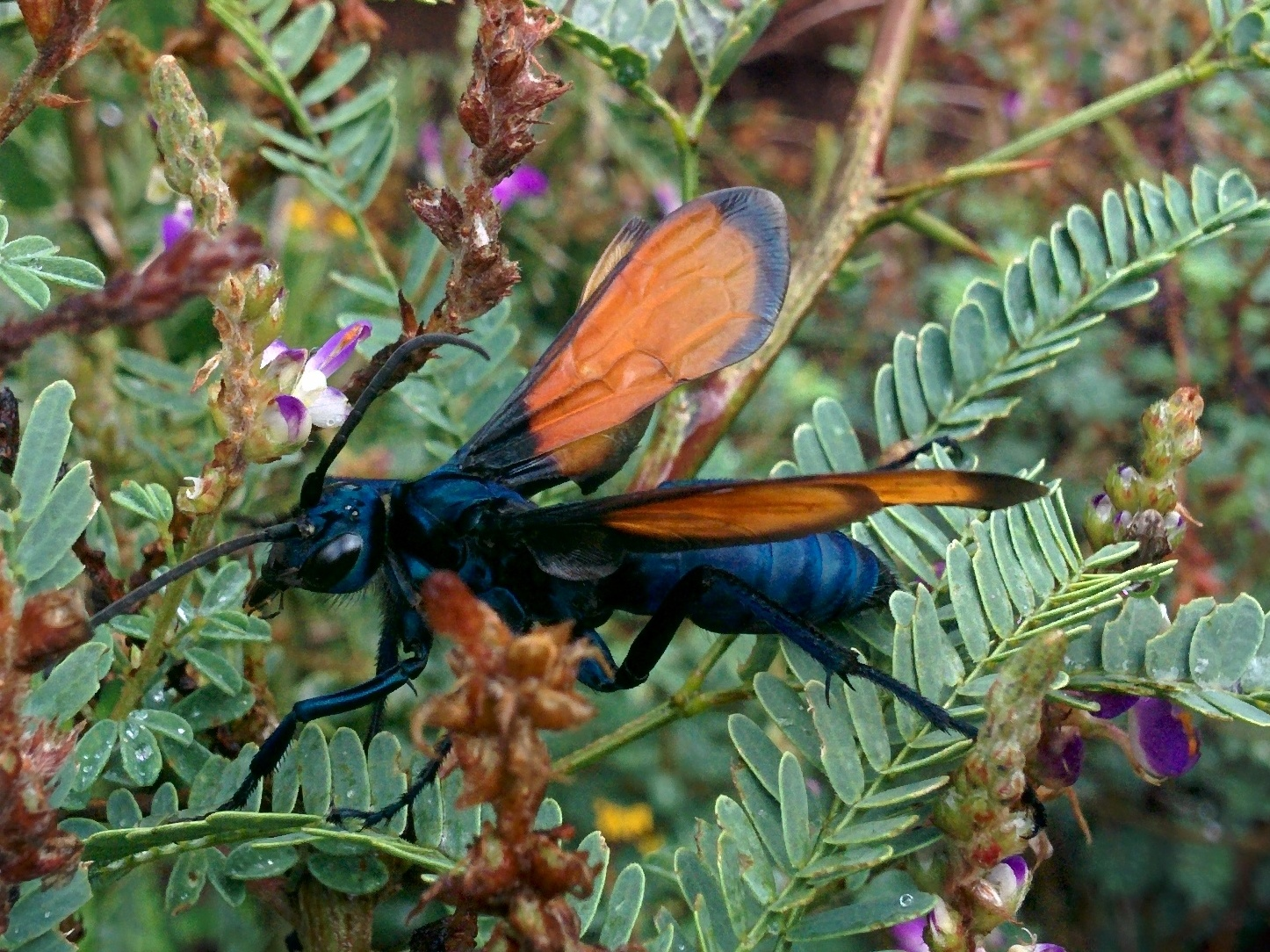
- In Mexico

Scientific classification
- Kingdom: Animalia
- Phylum: Arthropoda
- Clade: Pancrustacea
- Class: Insecta
- Order: Hymenoptera
- Family: Pompilidae
- Subfamily: Pepsinae
- Tribe: Pepsini
- Genus: Pepsis
- Species: P. grossa

Binomial name
- Pepsis grossa (Fabricius, 1798)

Synonyms
- List: Sphex grossa Fabricius, 1798); Salius grossus (Fabricius, 1798); Pompilus formosus Say, 1823; Pepsis formosa (Say, 1823); Pepsis affinis Dahlbom, 1845; Pepsis nephele Lucas, 1895; Pepsis obliquerugosa Lucas, 1895; Pepsis pseudoformosa Cockerell, 1898; Pepsis colombica Brèthes, 1926; Pepsis pattoni Banks, 1945; Pepsis pellita Haupt, 1952

= Pepsis grossa =

Species of wasp

Pepsis grossa is a species of very large pepsine spider wasp from the southern part of North America, south to northern South America. They prey on tarantula spiders, giving rise to the name tarantula hawk for the wasps in the genus Pepsis and the related Hemipepsis. Only the females hunt, so only they are capable of delivering a sting, which is considered the second most painful of any insect sting, scoring 4.0 on the Schmidt sting pain index compared to the bullet ant's 4.0+. It is the state insect of New Mexico. The colour morphs are the xanthic orange-winged form and the melanic black winged form. In northern South America, a third form, known as "lygamorphic", has a dark base to the wings which have dark amber median patches and a pale tip.

== Taxonomy and description ==
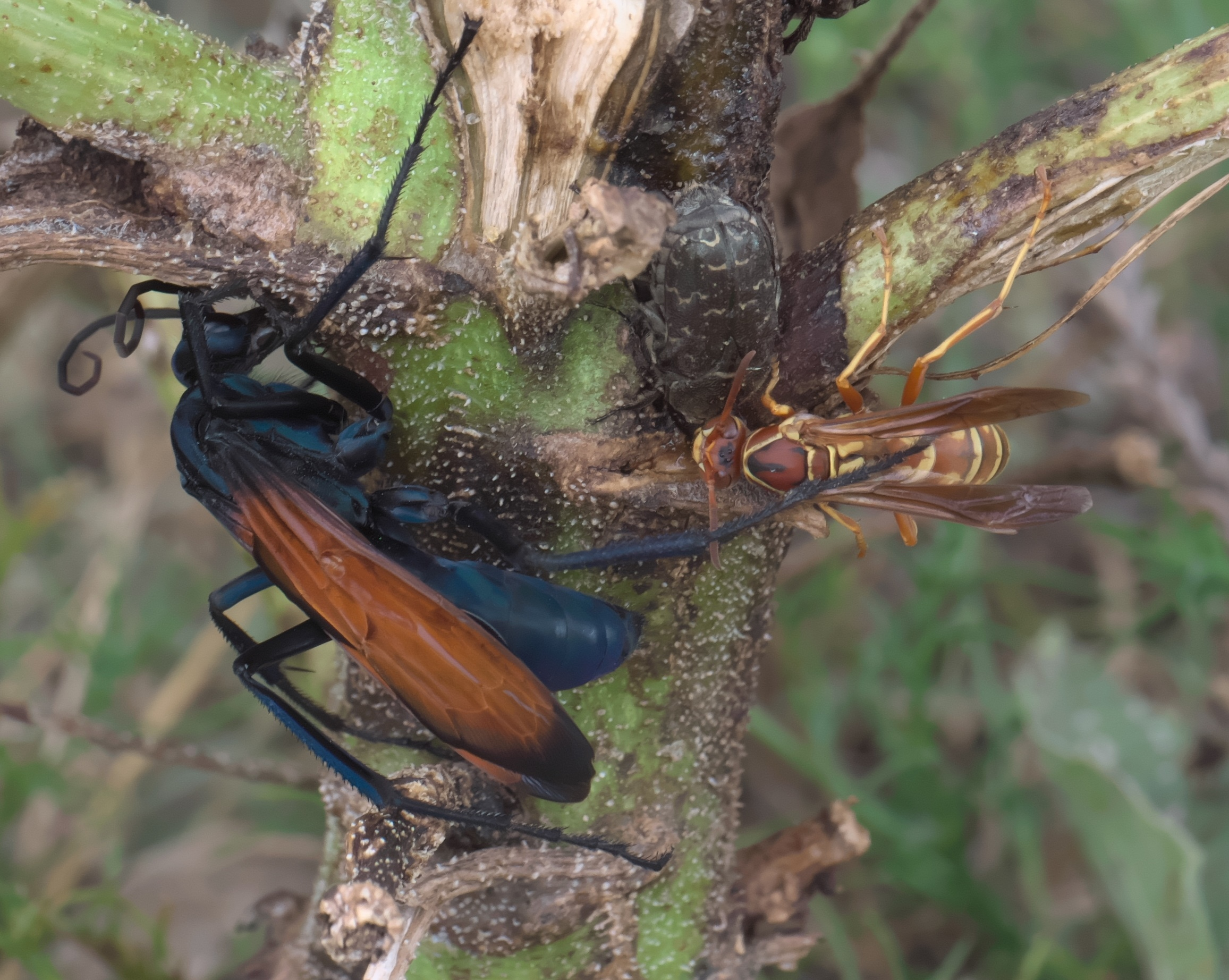
Pepsis grossa, alongside a golden paper wasp for scale

Due in part to confusion over the distinctness of various colour forms, until 2002 this species was known by the name Pepsis formosa, including a subspecies P. formosa pattoni, but C.R. Vardy synonymized both forms of P. formosa into P. grossa.

The three colour forms are normally geographically separated; the melanic form occurs in the western part of the North American range, the xanthic form predominates over the remainder of the distribution, except that lygamorphic individuals predominate in the southernmost part of the species range. Individuals of the melanic form of this species are difficult to separate from Pepsis mexicana, but P. mexicana is always noticeably smaller than it. The female's body length is 30–51 mm (1.18–2.00 in), and the males measure 24–40 mm (0.94–1.57 in). The black and orange colour pattern, combined with the wasps' jerky behaviour and strong odour, give an aposematic warning to predators.

Males of this species are distinct within the genus Pepsis in that they have only 12 antennal segments: a scape, a pedicel, and 10 flagellomeres. The males of all other Pepsis species possess 13 antennal segments (i.e. 11 flagellomeres). Younger females of P. grossa have long, coarse hairs beneath the femur of the front leg, but these can be worn off in older specimens.

== Distribution ==
This species is found from the southern United States of America as far north as Kansas through Mexico and Central America south to northern South America, including the Caribbean.

== Biology ==
These wasps prey almost exclusively on tarantulas of the family Theraphosidae. In Texas, the preferred prey is Aphonopelma hentzi. The female wasps hunt in a crepuscular pattern, avoiding the intense daytime sun, by flying low over the ground, detecting their prey using vision or scent, possibly detecting the occupied burrows by the scent of the silk curtain the spider weaves over the entrance. The females may also hunt on the ground, flicking her wings and antennae quite intensively.

Once a spider has been detected, the wasp uses its mandibles and carefully enters the spider's burrow. This seems to cause the spider to leave the burrow where the wasp and it can fight; the wasp has to evict the spider to ensure it has space to maneuver. Once the spider has been evicted, the wasp steps away from it and grooms itself before using its antennae to cause the spider to raise itself into a threat posture by raising its front legs and baring its fangs. The wasp then grabs the second legs and injects the spider with her sting between the base of the leg and the sternum, striking a nerve centre and causing paralysis in the spider. She may then feed on fluid exuding from the wound she has caused or she may groom herself again. The wasp may then drag the spider back into her burrow, or she may dig a new burrow, before laying a single egg on the spider and sealing the chamber.

The larva hatches from the egg and carefully consumes the paralysed spider, and when it is finished consuming the spider’s vital organs, the larva weaves a silken cocoon for itself. It then metamorphoses into a pupa before emerging as an adult wasp. When the female is choosing spiders, she selects the larger specimens, usually females, to lay fertilised eggs on and these produce female wasps, unfertilised eggs are laid on captured male spiders and these hatch into male wasps.

In Big Bend Ranch State Park, Texas, four species of plants accounted for 73.6% of all plants which were used by adults for feeding; these were the milkweeds: Asclepias texana and Asclepias sperryi; Mexican buckeye Ungnadia speciosa, and honey mesquite Prosopis glandulosa. Wasps of the genus Pepsis do seem to be important pollinators of milkweeds which are regarded as noxious weeds, as they are poisonous to grazing livestock.

P. grossa forms mixed-species, mixed-sex aggregations that appear to be defensive in nature and probably assist in the location of resources and mating opportunities.

== Predators ==
These wasps are infrequently recorded as prey for other animals, with kingbirds (Tyrannus species) and the greater roadrunner (Geococcyx californianus) being recorded as preying on P. grossa. The roadrunner beats the wasp against the ground before it eats it. Roadrunners have also been known to kleptoparasitise tarantula hawks, i.e., steal the spider from the wasp while otherwise leaving the wasp unharmed. The American bullfrog Lithobates catesbeianus has also been recorded preying on these wasps.

== Sting ==
Wasps of the genera Pepsis and Hemipepsis produce large quantities of venom, and when stung, humans experience immediate, intense, excruciating short-term pain. Although the immediate pain of a tarantula hawk sting is among the greatest recorded for any stinging insect, the venom itself is not very toxic. The lethality of 65 mg/kg in mice for the venom of P. grossa reveals that the defensive value of the sting and the venom is based entirely upon pain. The pain experienced by the potential predator also forms an enabling basis for the evolution of aposematic coloration, aposematic odor, and a Müllerian mimicry complex involving most species of tarantula hawks as well as Batesian mimicry with other harmless insect species.

== Mimics ==
The robber fly Wyliea mydas is a Batesian mimic of both this species and P. thisbe, by having a black body and bright orange wings and by making stinging motions, exposing genitalia at the tip of its abdomen as if it were a sting. Other Batesian mimics include the fly Mydas xanthopterus as well as other Diptera, Coleoptera, moths, acridid grasshoppers, and other Hymenoptera.

== New Mexico state insect ==
A ballot to select a state insect for New Mexico was returned by almost 10,000 fourth, fifth, and sixth graders from 100 New Mexico schools, and the tarantula hawk wasp was chosen by an overwhelming margin, receiving over 50% of the vote. On April 3, 1989, New Mexico Governor Garrey Carruthers signed House Bill No. 468 declaring that the tarantula hawk wasp Pepsis formosa was the official insect of the state of New Mexico.
