= Pepsis chrysothemis =

Scientific classification
- Kingdom: Animalia
- Phylum: Arthropoda
- Clade: Pancrustacea
- Class: Insecta
- Order: Hymenoptera
- Family: Pompilidae
- Genus: Pepsis
- Species: P. chrysothemis

Binomial name
- Pepsis chrysothemis Lucas, 1895

Species of spider wasp

Pepsis chrysothemis is a species of spider wasp in the family Pompilidae.

Pepsis chrysothemis contains the following subspecies:

- Pepsis chrysothemis chrysothemis
- Pepsis chrysothemis lucasii
