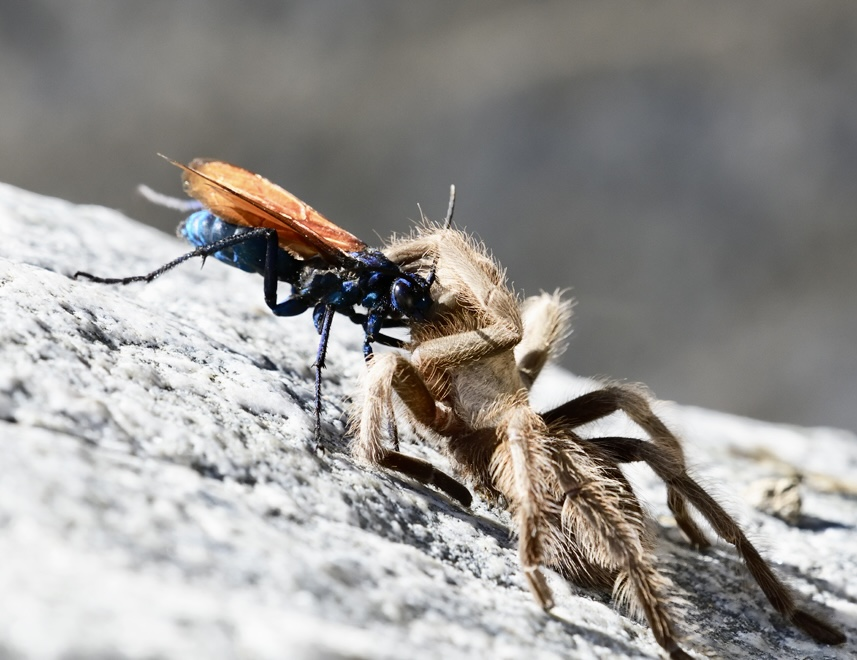
- Pepsis thisbe and prey, Riverside County, California, 2024

Scientific classification
- Kingdom: Animalia
- Phylum: Arthropoda
- Clade: Pancrustacea
- Class: Insecta
- Order: Hymenoptera
- Family: Pompilidae
- Subfamily: Pepsinae
- Tribe: Pepsini
- Genus: Pepsis
- Species: P. thisbe

Binomial name
- Pepsis thisbe Lucas, 1895

= Pepsis thisbe =

Species of wasp

Pepsis thisbe, also known as Thisbe's tarantula-hawk wasp, is a species of spider wasp in the family Pompilidae. Females are 32-44 mm long with a dark blue body and orange wings.

== Description ==
The females of this species sport curly antennae, while the males' are straight. Males do not have stingers and females have ones about 7mm (¼ inch) in length. Adults are nectarivores (feeding on flower material), but females hunt tarantulas as food for larvae, hence their name. They are found throughout the American Southwest in dry, arid areas, typical of this region.
