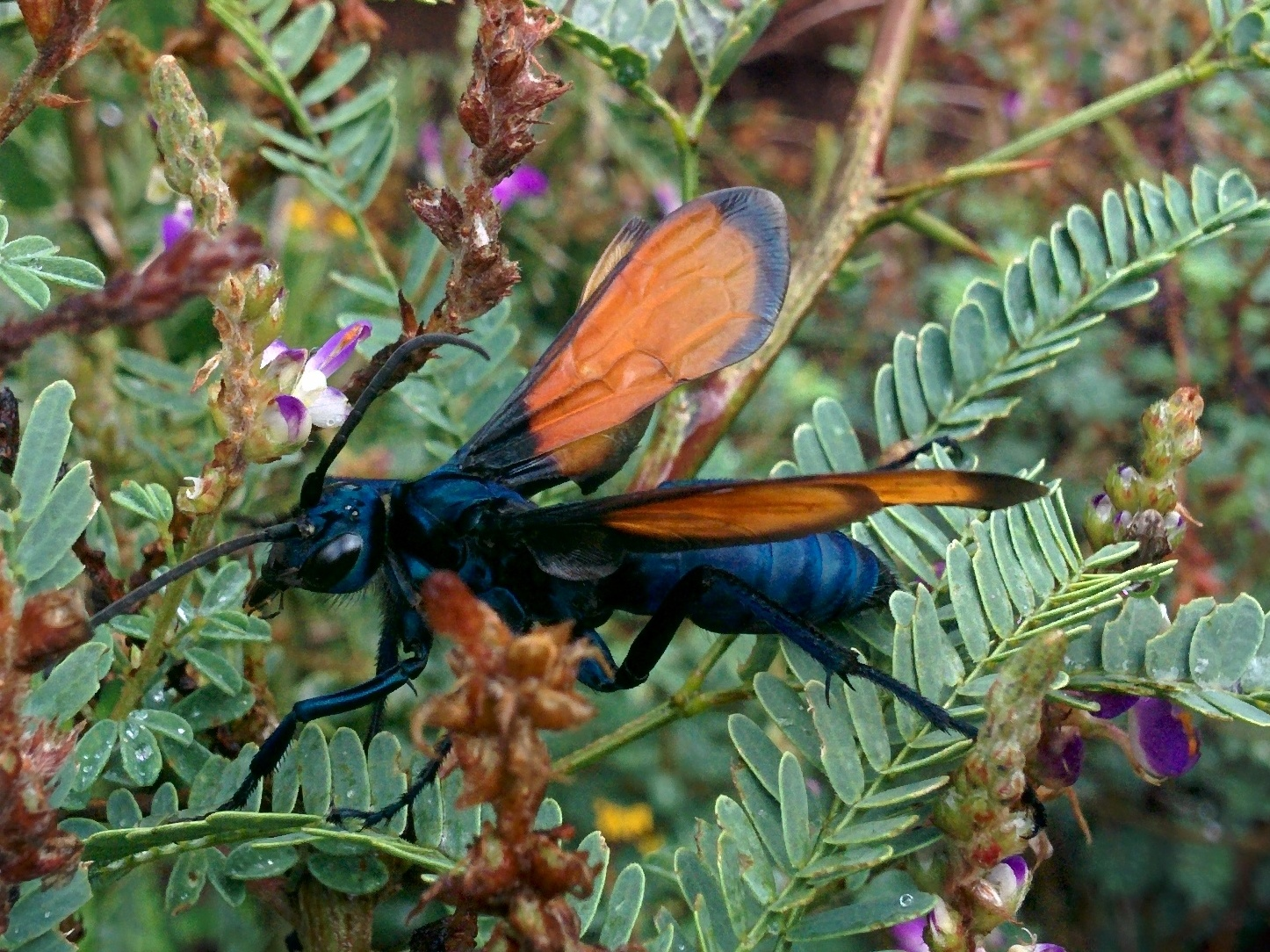
- Pepsis grossa

Scientific classification
- Kingdom: Animalia
- Phylum: Arthropoda
- Class: Insecta
- Order: Hymenoptera
- Family: Pompilidae
- Tribe: Pepsini
- Genus: Pepsis; Fabricius, 1804

Type species
- Sphex stellata Fabricius, 1793 (= Sphex rubra Drury, 1773)

Species
- See text

= Pepsis =

Genus of wasps

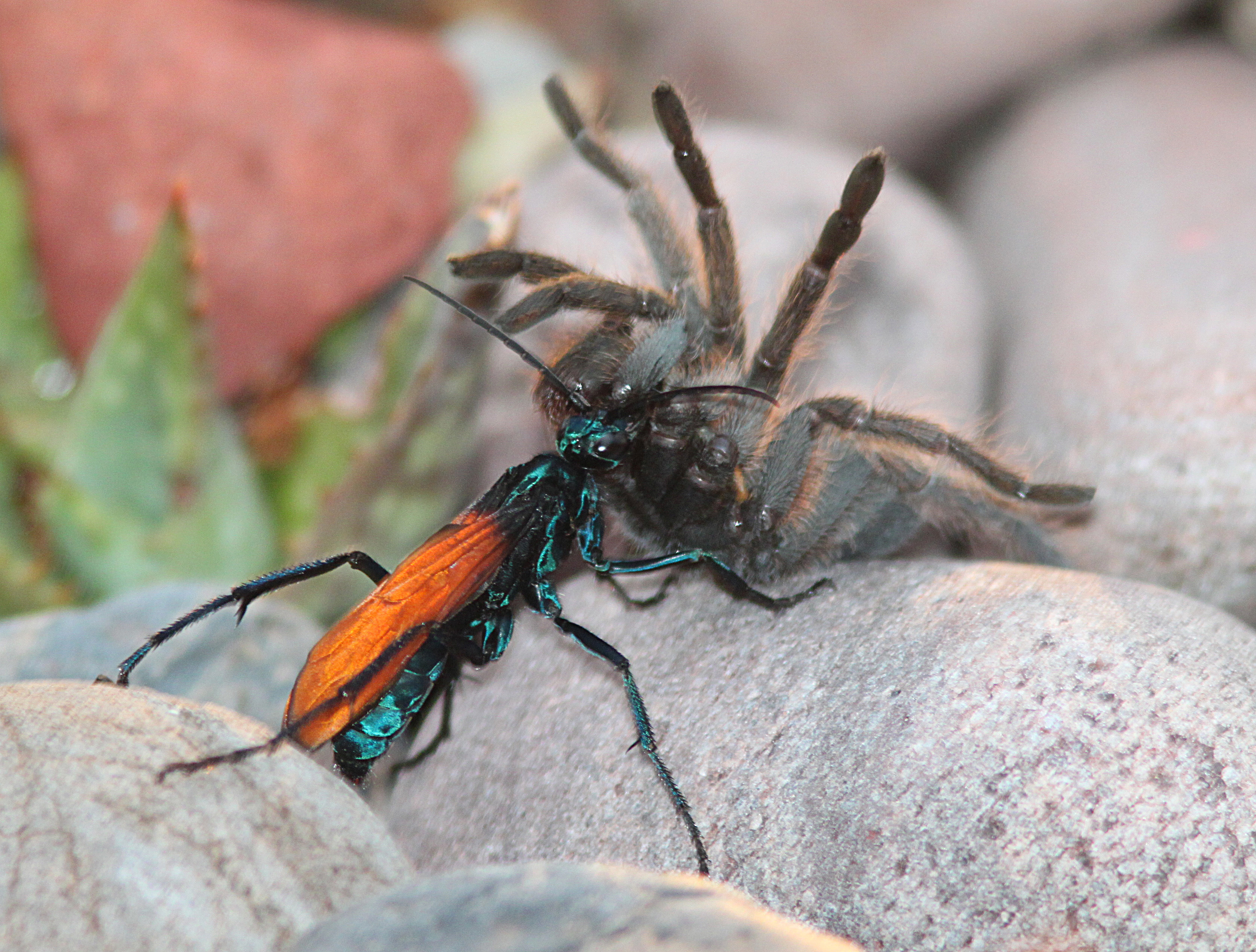
Pepsis versus tarantula in Arizona

Pepsis (from Ancient Greek πέψι lit. pepsis meaning 'digestion, cooking') is a genus of spider wasps belonging to the family Pompilidae. Species within this genus are also called tarantula hawks, as they usually hunt tarantulas, similarly to many species in the genus Hemipepsis. These wasps are restricted to the Americas, with the related genus Hemipepsis occurring in both Old and New Worlds.

== Species ==
Species within this genus include:

- Pepsis achterbergi Vardy, 2005
- Pepsis aciculata Taschenberg, 1869
- Pepsis adonta Vardy, 2005
- Pepsis albocincta Smith, 1855
- Pepsis amyntas Mocsáry, 1885
- Pepsis apicata Taschenberg, 1869
- Pepsis aquila H. Lucas, 1895
- Pepsis assimilis Banks, 1946
- Pepsis asteria Mocsáry, 1894
- Pepsis atalanta Mocsáry, 1885
- Pepsis atripennis Fabricius, 1804
- Pepsis aurifex Smith, 1855
- Pepsis auriguttata Burmeister, 1872
- Pepsis aurozonata Smith, 1855
- Pepsis australis Saussure, 1868
- Pepsis basalis Mocsáry, 1885
- Pepsis basifusca H. Lucas, 1895
- Pepsis boharti Vardy, 2005
- Pepsis bonplandi Brèthes, 1914
- Pepsis brevicornis Mocsáry, 1894
- Pepsis brunneicornis H. Lucas, 1895
- Pepsis caliente Vardy, 2005
- Pepsis caridei Brèthes, 1908
- Pepsis cassiope Mocsáry, 1888
- Pepsis catarinensis Vardy, 2005
- Pepsis chacoana Brèthes, 1908
- Pepsis chiliensis Lepeletier, 1845
- Pepsis chiron Mocsáry, 1885
- Pepsis chrysoptera Burmeister, 1872
- Pepsis chrysothemis H. Lucas, 1895
- Pepsis cincta (Fabricius, 1793)
- Pepsis cofanes Banks, 1946
- Pepsis completa Smith, 1855
- Pepsis convexa H. Lucas, 1895
- Pepsis cooperi Vardy, 2000
- Pepsis crassicornis Mocsáry, 1885
- Pepsis cyanescens Lepeletier, 1845
- Pepsis cybele Banks, 1945
- Pepsis dayi Vardy, 2005
- Pepsis deaurata Mocsáry, 1894
- Pepsis decipiens H. Lucas, 1895
- Pepsis decorata Perty, 1833
- Pepsis defecta Taschenberg, 1869
- Pepsis dimidiata Fabricius, 1804
- Pepsis discolor Taschenberg, 1869
- Pepsis ecuadorae Vardy, 2002
- Pepsis egregia Mocsáry, 1885
- Pepsis elevata Fabricius, 1804
- Pepsis elongata Lepeletier, 1845
- Pepsis equestris Erischson, 1848
- Pepsis esmeralda Vardy, 2005
- Pepsis festiva Fabricius, 1804
- Pepsis filiola Brèthes, 1914
- Pepsis flavescens H. Lucas, 1895
- Pepsis flavipennis (Fabricius, 1793)
- Pepsis foxi H. Lucas, 1897
- Pepsis friburgensis Vardy, 2002
- Pepsis frivaldszkyi Mocsáry, 1885
- Pepsis fumipennis Smith, 1855
- Pepsis gracilis Lepeletier, 1845
- Pepsis gracillima Taschenberg, 1869
- Pepsis grossa (Fabricius, 1798)
- Pepsis helvolicornis H. Lucas, 1895
- Pepsis heros (Fabricius, 1798)
- Pepsis hirtiventris Banks, 1946
- Pepsis hyalinipennis Mocsáry, 1885
- Pepsis hymenaea Mocsáry, 1885
- Pepsis hyperion Mocsáry, 1894
- Pepsis ianthina Erichson, 1848
- Pepsis ianthoides Vardy, 2005
- Pepsis inbio Vardy, 2000
- Pepsis inclyta Lepeletier, 1845
- Pepsis infuscata Spinola, 1841
- Pepsis jamaicensis Vardy, 2005
- Pepsis krombeini Vardy, 2005
- Pepsis laetabilis Brèthes, 1908
- Pepsis lampas H. Lucas, 1895
- Pepsis lepida Mocsáry, 1894
- Pepsis limbata Guerin, 1831
- Pepsis luteicornis Fabricius, 1804
- Pepsis lycaon Banks, 1945
- Pepsis maeandrina H. Lucas, 1895
- Pepsis marginata Palisot de Beauvois, 1809
- Pepsis marthae Vardy, 2002
- Pepsis martini Vardy, 2005
- Pepsis menechma Lepeletier, 1845
- Pepsis mexicana H. Lucas, 1895
- Pepsis mildei Stål, 1857
- Pepsis minarum Brèthes, 1914
- Pepsis montezuma Smith, 1855
- Pepsis multichroma Vardy, 2005
- Pepsis nana Mocsáry, 1885
- Pepsis nanoides Vardy, 2005
- Pepsis nigricans H. Lucas, 1895
- Pepsis nitida Lepeletier, 1845
- Pepsis onorei Vardy, 2002
- Pepsis optima Smith, 1879
- Pepsis optimatis Smith, 1873
- Pepsis pallidolimbata H. Lucas, 1895
- Pepsis petitii Guerin, 1831
- Pepsis pilosa Banks, 1946
- Pepsis plutus Erichson, 1848
- Pepsis pretiosa Dahlbom, 1843
- Pepsis pulawskii Vardy, 2002
- Pepsis pulszkyi Mocsáry, 1885
- Pepsis purpurea Smith, 1873
- Pepsis purpureipes Packard, 1869
- Pepsis riopretensis Vardy, 2002
- Pepsis roigi Vardy, 2000
- Pepsis rubra (Drury, 1773)
- Pepsis ruficornis (Fabricius, 1775)
- Pepsis sabina Mocsáry, 1885
- Pepsis schlinkei H. Lucas, 1897
- Pepsis seifferti H. Lucas, 1895
- Pepsis seladonica Dahlbom, 1843
- Pepsis sericans Lepeletier, 1845
- Pepsis smaragdina Dahlbom, 1843
- Pepsis sommeri Dahlbom, 1845
- Pepsis stella Montet, 1921
- Pepsis sumptuosa Smith, 1855
- Pepsis taschenbergi H. Lucas, 1895
- Pepsis terminata Dahlbom, 1843
- Pepsis thisbe H. Lucas, 1895
- Pepsis thoreyi Dahlbom, 1845
- Pepsis tolteca H. Lucas, 1895
- Pepsis toppini Turner, 1915
- Pepsis tricuspidata Gribodo, 1894
- Pepsis varipennis Lepeletier, 1845
- Pepsis vinipennis Packard, 1869
- Pepsis viridis Lepeletier, 1845
- Pepsis viridisetosa Spinola, 1841
- Pepsis vitripennis Smith, 1855
- Pepsis wahisi Vardy, 2005
- Pepsis xanthocera Dahlbom, 1843
- Pepsis yucatani Vardy, 2002

== Bibliography ==
- Fred Punzo, Brian Garman. 1989. Effects of Encounter Experience on the hunting behavior of the spider wasp, Pepsis formosa (Say) (Hymenoptera: Pompilidae). In: The Southwestern Naturalist 34(4). December 1989, ISSN 0038-4909, S. 513–518.
- Harris, A. C. 1987. Pompilidae (Insecta: Hymenoptera). Fauna of New Zealand. DSIR Science Information Publishing Centre. 12:1-154.
