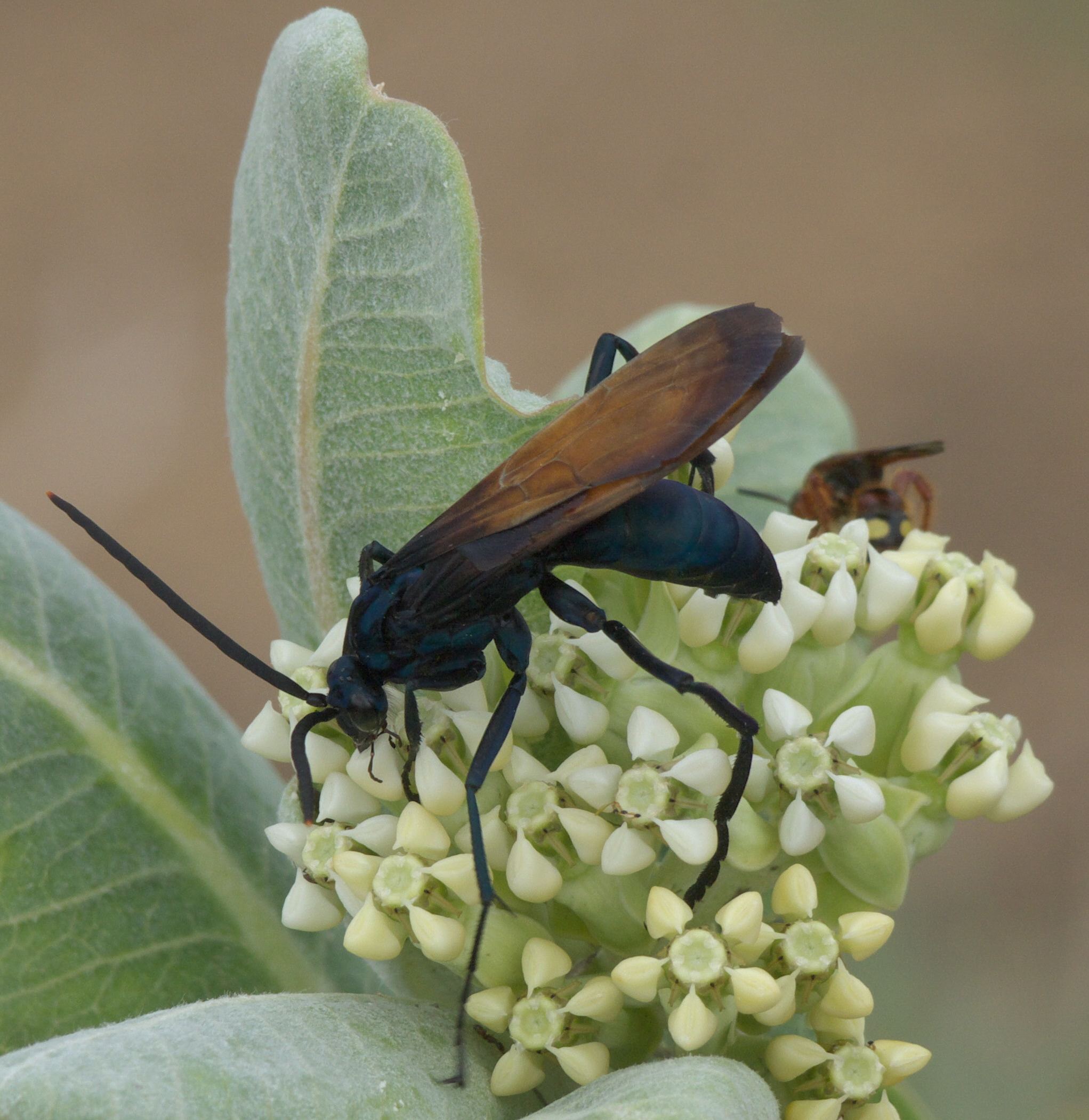
- male Pepsis on a milkweed plant

Scientific classification
- Kingdom: Animalia
- Phylum: Arthropoda
- Clade: Pancrustacea
- Class: Insecta
- Order: Hymenoptera
- Family: Pompilidae
- Subfamily: Pepsinae
- Tribe: Pepsini

Genera with tarantula hawk species
- Pepsis; Hemipepsis

= Tarantula hawk =

Common name for two genera of wasps

A tarantula hawk is a spider wasp (Pompilidae) that preys on tarantulas. Tarantula hawks belong to any of the many species in the genera Pepsis and Hemipepsis. They are some of the largest parasitoid wasps, using their sting to paralyze their prey before dragging it into a brood nest as living food; a single egg is laid on the prey, hatching to a larva, which then eats the still-living host. They are found on all continents other than Europe and Antarctica.

== Description ==
These wasps grow up to 6.5 centimetres (2 1/2 in) long, making them among the largest of wasps, and have blue-black bodies and bright, rust-colored wings (other species have black wings with blue highlights). The vivid coloration found on their bodies, and especially wings, is aposematic, advertising to potential predators the wasps' ability to deliver a powerful sting. Their long legs have hooked claws for grappling with their victims. The stinger of a female Pepsis grossa can be up to 12 mm (15/32 in) long, and the powerful sting is considered one of the most painful insect stings in the world.

== Behavior ==
The female tarantula hawk wasp stings a tarantula between the legs, paralyzing it, and then drags the prey to a specially prepared burrow, where a single egg is laid on the spider's abdomen, and the burrow entrance is covered. Sex of offspring is determined by fertilization; fertilized eggs produce females, while unfertilized eggs produce males. When the wasp larva hatches, it creates a small hole in the spider's abdomen, then enters and feeds voraciously, avoiding vital organs for as long as possible to keep the spider alive. After several weeks, the larva pupates. Finally, the wasp becomes an adult and emerges from the spider's abdomen to continue the life cycle.

Adult tarantula hawks are nectarivorous. While the wasps tend to be most active in the daytime in summer, they tend to avoid high temperatures. The male tarantula hawk does not hunt. Both males and females feed on the flowers of milkweeds, western soapberry trees, or mesquite trees. Male tarantula hawks have been observed practicing a behavior called hill-topping, in which they sit atop tall plants and watch for passing females ready to reproduce. The males can become resident defenders of the favorable reproduction spots for hours into the afternoon. Females are hesitant to sting, but the sting is extraordinarily painful.

== Distribution ==
Worldwide distribution of tarantula hawks includes areas from Southeast Asia to Africa, Australia, and the Americas, with the genus Pepsis entirely restricted to the New World. In the latter, Pepsis species have been observed from as far north as Logan, Utah, and south as far as Argentina, with at least 250 species living in South America. Eighteen species of Pepsis and three species of Hemipepsis are found in the United States, primarily in the deserts of the Southwestern United States, with Pepsis grossa (formerly P. formosa) and Pepsis thisbe being common. The two species are difficult to distinguish, but most P. grossa wasps have metallic blue bodies and reddish antennae, which separate them from P. thisbe. Both species have bright orange wings that become transparent near the tip.

== Sting ==
Tarantula hawk wasps are relatively docile and rarely sting without provocation, but the sting—particularly that of P. grossa—is among the most painful of all insects, though the intense pain only lasts about five minutes. One researcher described the pain as "...immediate, excruciating, unrelenting pain that simply shuts down one's ability to do anything, except scream. Mental discipline simply does not work in these situations." In terms of scale, the wasp's sting is rated near the top of the Schmidt sting pain index, second only to that of the bullet ant, and is described by Schmidt as "blinding, fierce[, and] shockingly electric". Because of their extremely large stingers, very few animals are able to eat them; one of the few that can is the roadrunner. Many predatory animals avoid these wasps, and many different insects mimic them, including various other wasps and bees (Müllerian mimics), as well as moths, flies (e.g., mydas flies), and beetles (e.g., Tragidion) (Batesian mimics).

Aside from the possibility of triggering an allergic reaction, the sting is not dangerous and does not require medical attention. Local redness appears in most cases after the pain, and lasts for up to a week.

== State insect of New Mexico ==
In 1989 the U.S. state of New Mexico chose a species of tarantula hawk (specifically, P. formosa, now known as P. grossa) to become its official state insect. Its selection was prompted by a group of elementary-school children from Edgewood doing research on states that had adopted state insects. They selected three insects as candidates and mailed ballots to all schools for a statewide election. The winner was the tarantula hawk wasp.

Tarantula hawk wasp
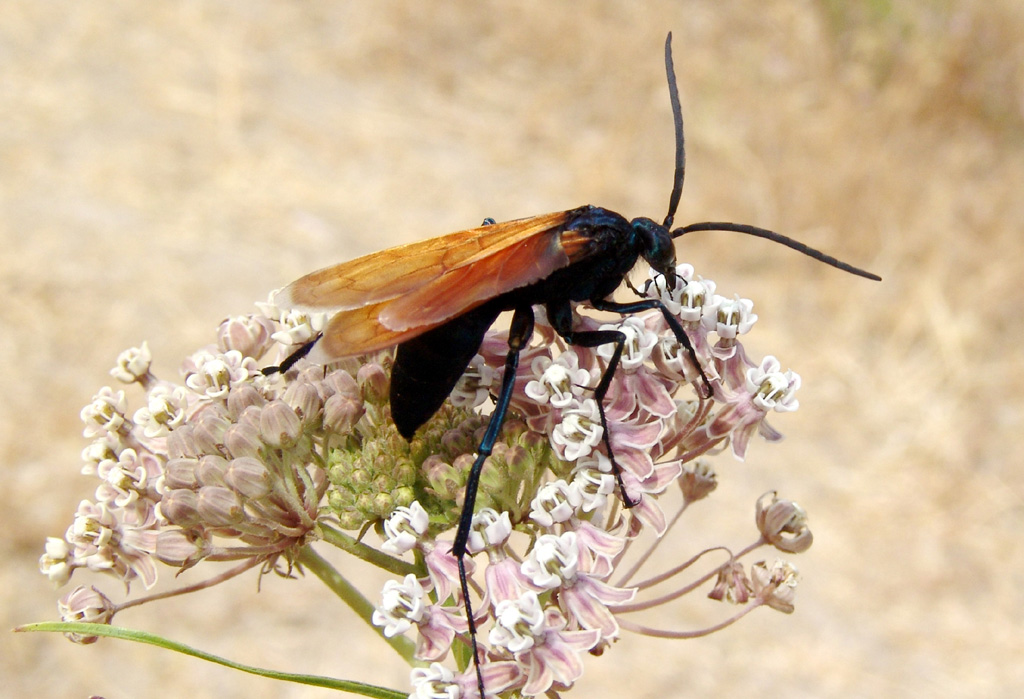
Male tarantula hawk at Grant Ranch County Park, near San Jose, California

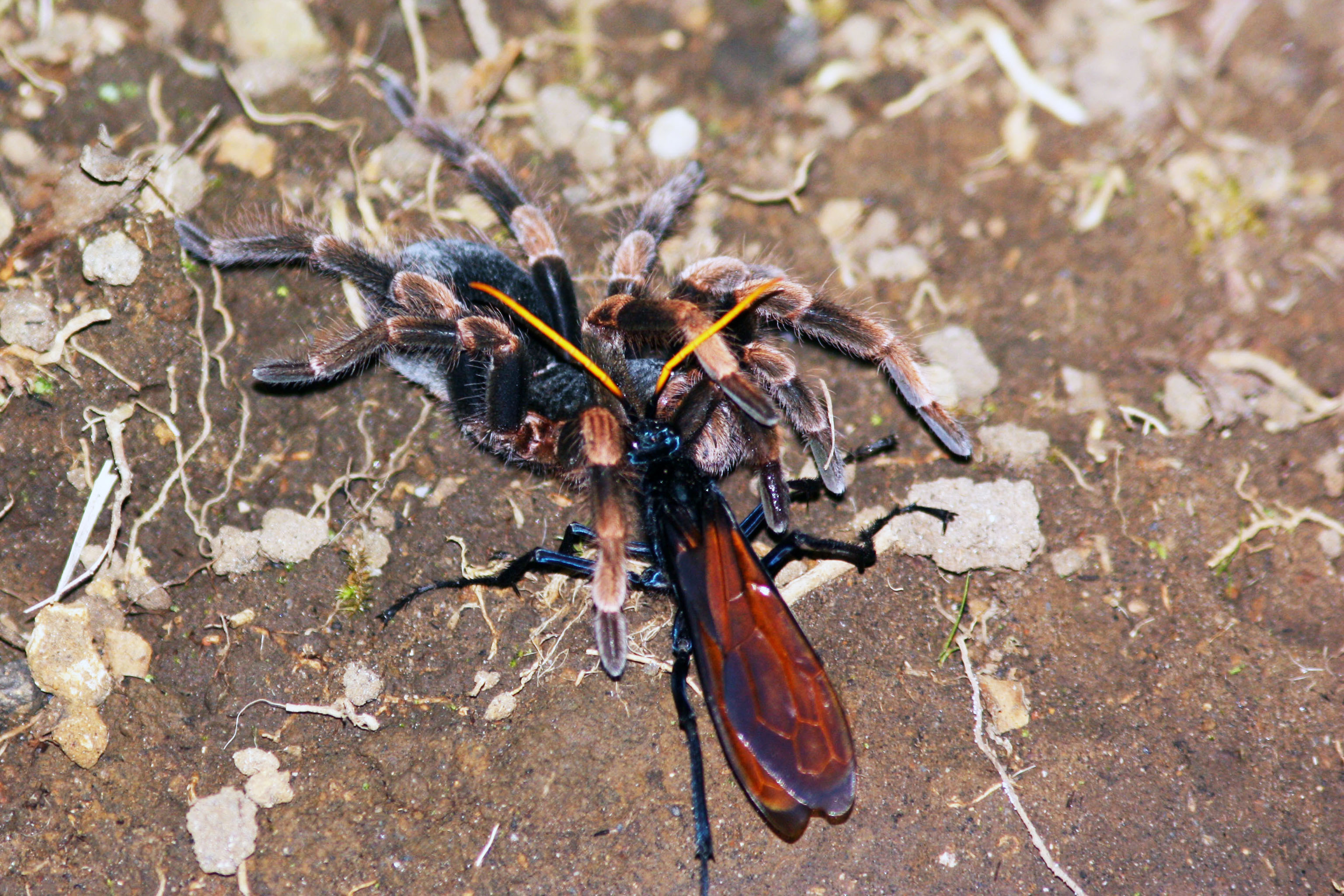
Tarantula hawk dragging a paralysed orange-kneed tarantula, Costa Rica

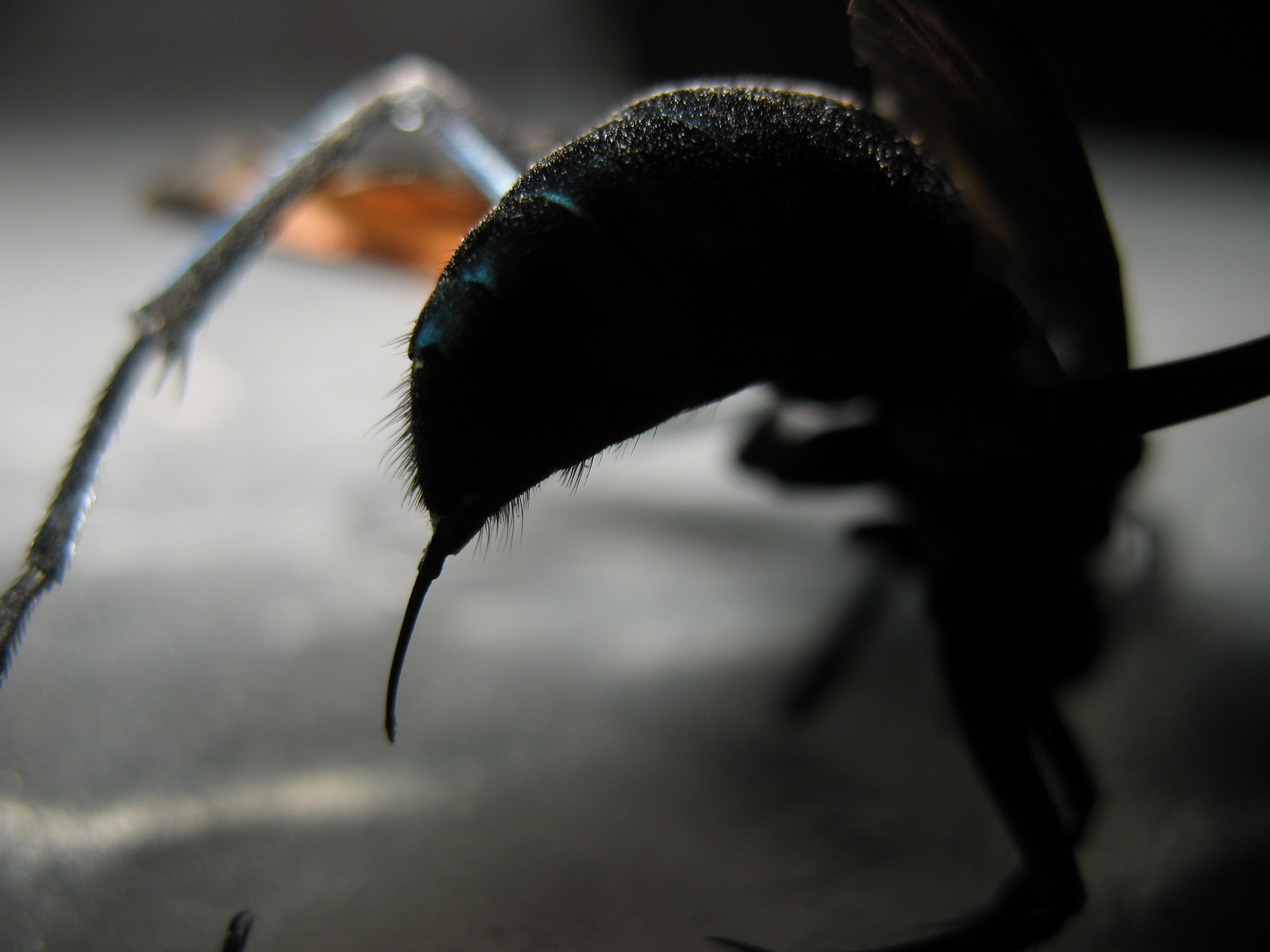
Tarantula hawk stinger

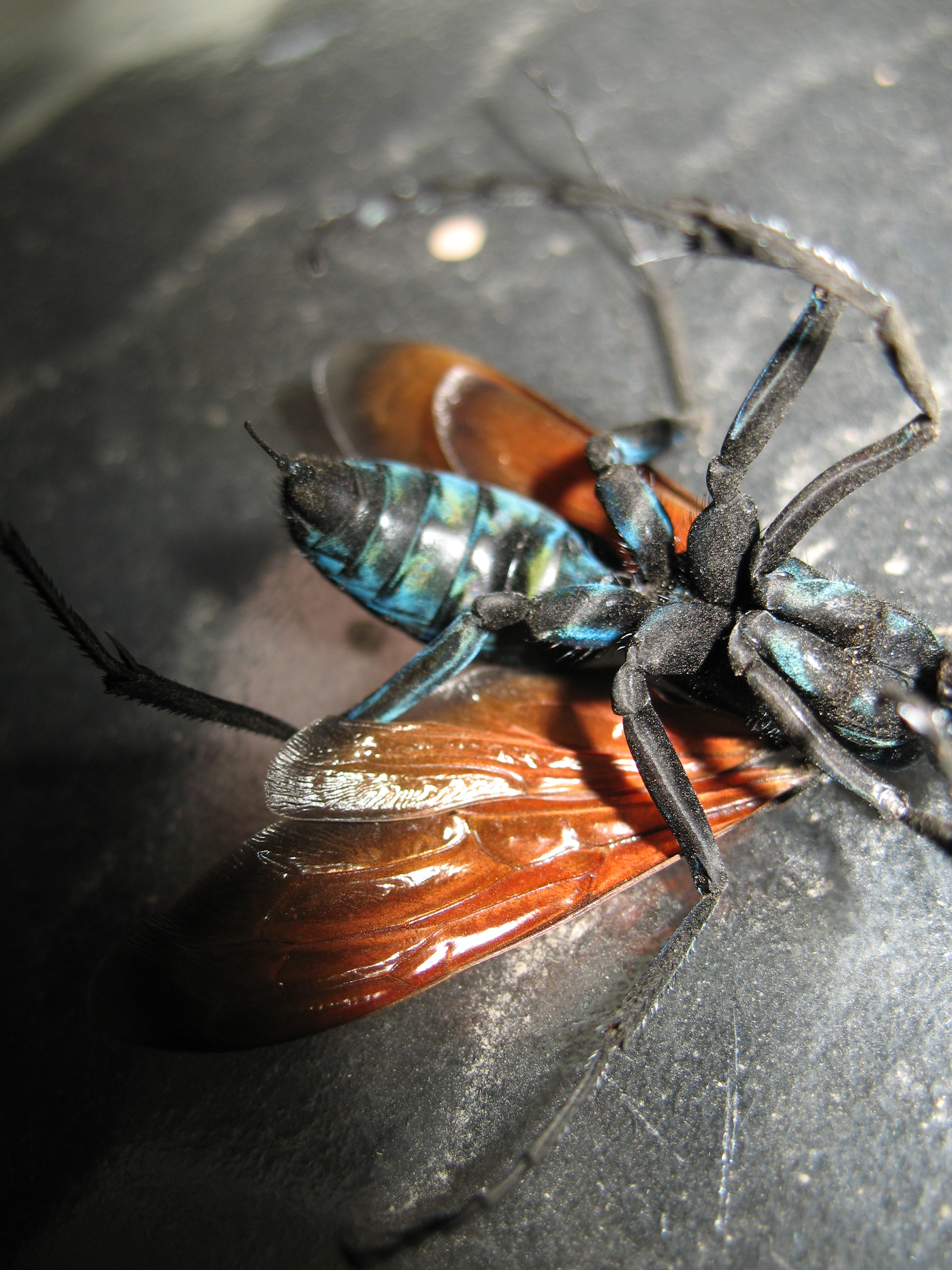
Tarantula hawk's blue-black abdomen
