= Quitobaquito Springs =

Waterbody in Pima County, Arizona

Coordinates: 31°56′38″N 113°01′10″W

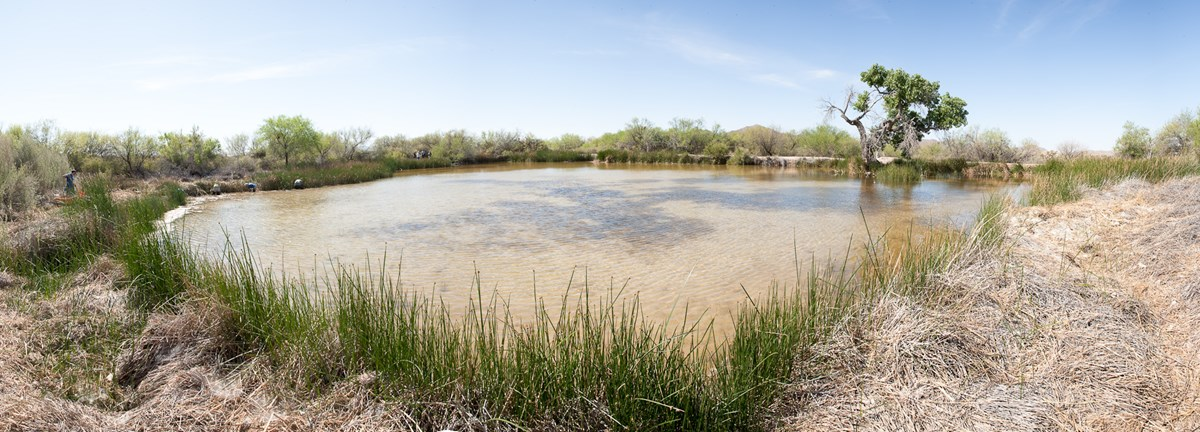
Quitobaquito Pond.

Quitobaquito Springs (Oʼodham: A’al Vaipia) are springs in Organ Pipe Cactus National Monument in Pima County, Arizona. The name is of Tohono O'odham origin meaning 'house ring spring'. The area has been populated for at least 16,000 years. It lies at an elevation of 1,152 feet (351 m), west of the south end of the Quitobaquito Hills, along the border of the United States with Mexico. The only US populations of the endangered Quitobaquito pupfish, the Sonoyta mud turtle, the desert caper, and the Howarth's white butterfly are found here. The Quitabaquito tryonia is an endemic resident of the springs.

== History ==
The area around Quitobaquito Springs has been populated by desert-dwelling peoples for at least 16,000 years. It has served as a water source for local Tohono O'odham people. It was used by the Spanish explorers, Díaz, Kino, Garces and de Anza. El Camino del Diablo trail established by de Anza from Sonora to Alta California used and passed through the area of the spring which provided a trail for subsequent travelers between Sonora and California into the later 19th century.

The famous pond fed by the springs was built in the 1860s, and has a clay liner that requires frequent upkeep. In mid-2020, there was a massive drop in the pond's water levels, the likes of which have only been seen a few other times in the prior 60 years, causing large stretches of mudflats over the pond's north side. It has been speculated that this drop may be due to overdrafting by farmers in Sonoyta as well as the summer heat, but others suspect that the drop may be due to the construction of the Mexico–United States border wall nearby, which could have caused cracks in the pond's lining, causing water leakage, as well as excessive pumping of groundwater to create concrete for the wall.
