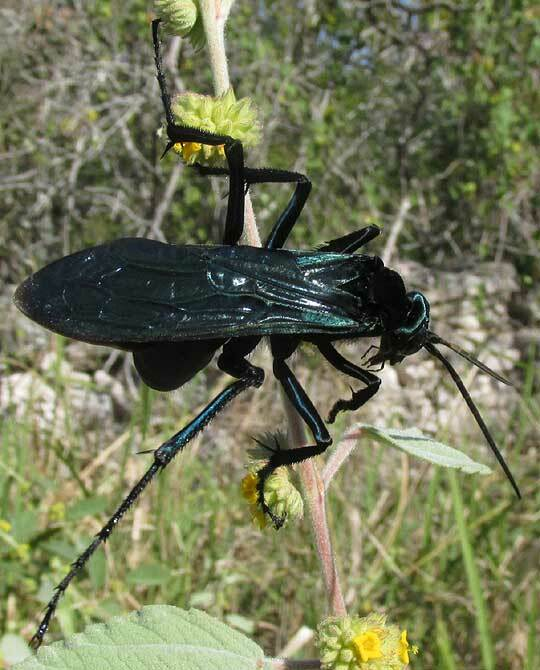
- Mexican tarantula-hawk wasp, Pepsis mexicana

Scientific classification
- Kingdom: Animalia
- Phylum: Arthropoda
- Clade: Pancrustacea
- Class: Insecta
- Order: Hymenoptera
- Family: Pompilidae
- Genus: Pepsis
- Species: P. mexicana

Binomial name
- Pepsis mexicana Lucas, 1895

Synonyms
- Pepsis messerschmidti Lucas, 1895

= Pepsis mexicana =

Species of wasp

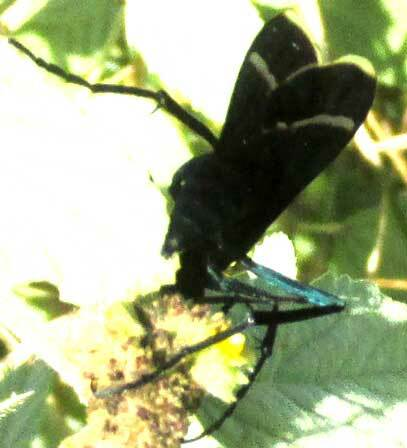
white wing apexes seen from below

Pepsis mexicana, commonly known as the Mexican tarantula-hawk wasp, is a species of wasp belonging to the Spider Wasps Family, the Pompilidae.

== Description ==
On this page and the iNaturalist page showing images associated with research-grade observations of Pepsis mexicana, it's seen that the wasp is black, usually with a metallic-blue sheen; wing apexes exhibit white edges if they haven't worn away. Wing color and the wings' narrow, white apex borders distinguish Pepsis mexicana from other tarantula-hawk species. Male Pepsis mexicana wasps are about 20mm long (~ 3/4 inch), while females are about 3mm longer (~ 1/8 inch). While Pepsis wasps are among the world's largest wasps, relative to other Pepsis species, the Mexican Tarantula-hawk Wasp is regarded as a small to medium species.

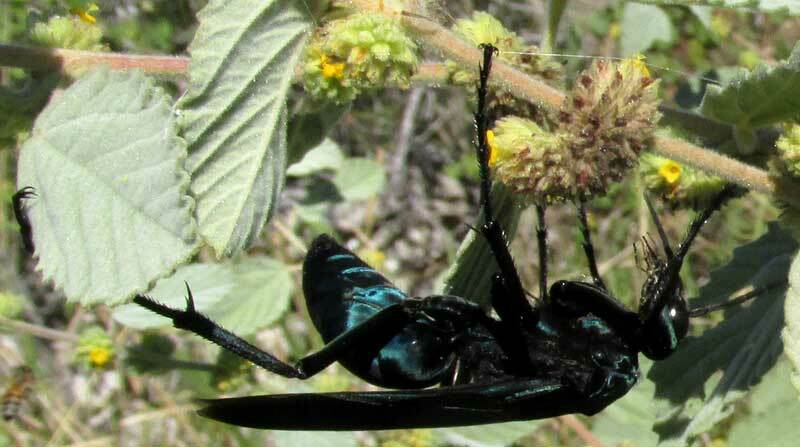
Mexican Tarantula-hawk Wasp searching for nectar

== Distribution ==
Pepsis mexicana occurs from the Southwestern United States (the Mojave Desert of southern California, the Sonoran Desert of southern Arizona and the Chihuahuan Desert of western Texas) south through Mexico and Central America into Costa Rica. In the Mexican state of Chiapas it ascends to 2500m (8200 feet).

== Life history ==
As with all members of the genus Pepsis, females of Pepsis mexicana capture and paralyze large theraphosid spiders (tarantulas) as a source of food for their carnivorous larvae. After stinging and paralyzing the tarantula, the female wasp drags it into the tarantula's former burrow or within a previously excavated nest. A single egg is deposited on the abdomen of the victim, then loose soil is compressed over the spider and egg. Both male and female Pepsis wasps feed on nectar of various flowering plant species.

== Painful stings ==
With regard to stings of humans, clinically it's established that though "... the instantaneous pain of a tarantula hawk sting is the greatest recorded for any stinging insect, the venom itself lacks meaningful vertebrate toxicity." It hurts a lot, but doesn't damage. Male tarantula hawk wasps don't sting, and females rarely sting humans without being provoked.

== Taxonomy ==
In the 2000 revision of the genus Pepsis by Vardy, the collection of a male known as Lucas no. 46 was designated as the lectotype for Pepsis mexicana; this collection is housed in the Museum für Naturkunde (MNHU), in Berlin, Germany.

== Etymology ==
In the binomial Pepsis mexicana, the genus Pepsis was named by the Danish zoologist Johan Christian Fabricius in 1805. In 1895, when the German entomologist Robert Lucas, working with collections in the Berlin Museum and other places, published a monograph on the genus Pepsis, on page 452 he wrote that Fabricius derived the name Pepsis from the Greek ή πέιριρ, the German meaning of which he interpreted as das Kneten, which in English means "kneading," as when one is kneading dough for bread. This is at odds with the usual etymology, which is that Pepsis is New Latin from the Ancient Greek word meaning "digestion."

The species name mexicana clearly refers to collections from which the species was described, which Lucas reports as taken in "Mexiko: Cuernavacca (Cuernavaca)," and at another unnamed Mexican location.
