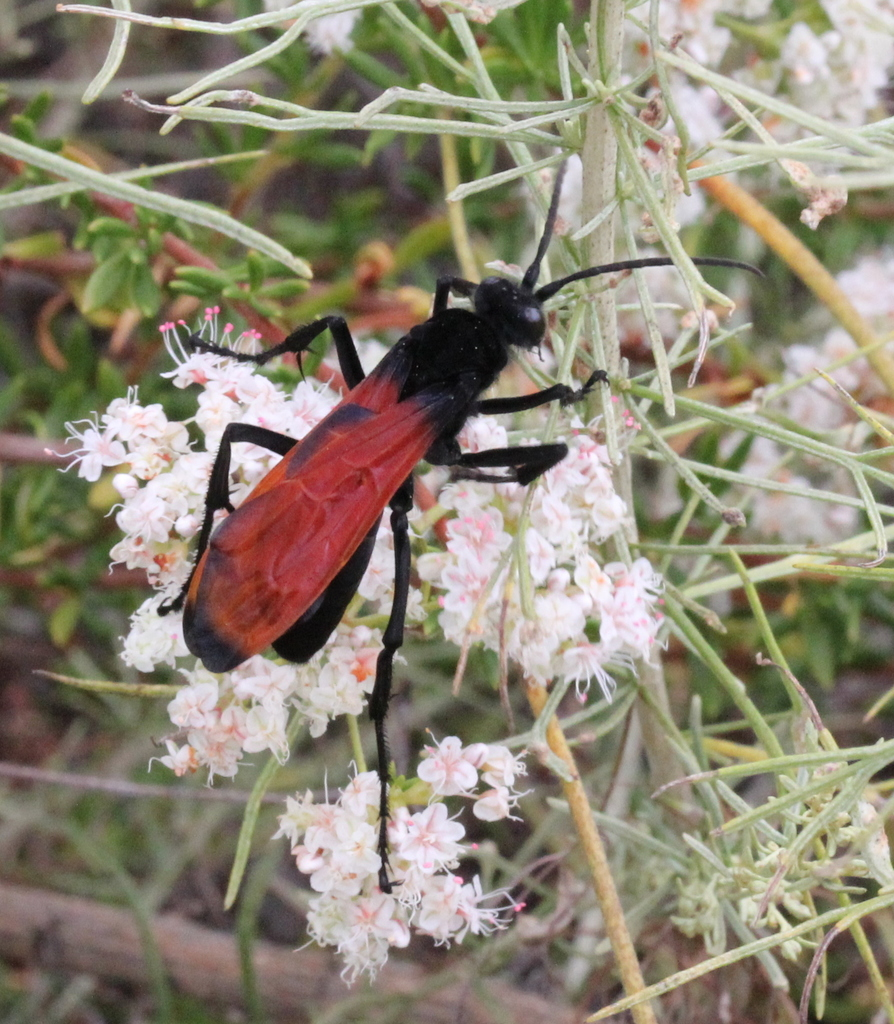
- San Diego, California

Scientific classification
- Kingdom: Animalia
- Phylum: Arthropoda
- Clade: Pancrustacea
- Class: Insecta
- Order: Hymenoptera
- Family: Pompilidae
- Genus: Hemipepsis
- Species: H. ustulata

Binomial name
- Hemipepsis ustulata Dahlbom, 1843

Synonyms
- Mygnimia cressoni (Banks, 1926)

= Hemipepsis ustulata =

Species of wasp

Hemipepsis ustulata is a species of tarantula hawk wasp native to the Southwestern United States. Tarantula hawks are a large, conspicuous family of long-legged wasps that prey on tarantulas by using their long legs to grapple with their prey and then paralyze them with a powerful sting (ranked as one of the most painful in the insect world by the Schmidt sting pain index). They are solitary, displaying lekking territorial behavior in their mating rituals.

== Description and identification ==
H. ustulata generally has a matte black body with rust-orange wings. It is among the largest of the Hymenoptera, growing up to 5 cm in length. Although Hemipepsis resembles its Pepsis relatives, the latter tends to be a more metallic black with a deep-blue striped patterning. Since their biologies and appearances are similar, the only reliable way to tell them apart is by their wing venation patterns.

== Distribution and habitat ==
H. ustulata is common in the arid climate of the Southwestern United States, ranging from California through Arizona, New Mexico, and Texas, and as far north as Nevada, Oklahoma, and Kansas. Much of the fieldwork done on H. ustulata was performed in the Sonoran Desert near Phoenix, Arizona, by John Alcock. H. ustulata's distribution overlaps with theraphosid spiders, which they parasitize to raise their young. The males, which are significantly smaller than the females, possess more slender bodies and exhibit a more vibrant hue in their wings, serving as a visual cue during mating rituals. Females, on the other hand, have robust bodies and their wings are slightly darker. The wasp's antenna, with its unique curve and twelve segmented parts, provides an additional layer for identification, distinguishing it from other Pompilidae members.

== Life history ==
=== Parasitoidism ===
The "tarantula hawk" namesake comes from its predation of tarantulas in raising its young. After mating, the female wasp seeks out a tarantula, either free-ranging or in its burrow. After grappling with the tarantula, the wasp delivers a powerful sting that paralyzes the tarantula, but keeps it alive. This allows the wasp to lay an egg that adheres to the spider's abdomen. One egg is provisioned per tarantula. The egg is about 5 mm long, gently curved, and creamy white in color. The wasp then drags the paralyzed tarantula along with the egg, sometimes up to 100 m, to a cavity or burrow to be sealed. This dugout can be either dug by the wasp or be the burrow of the paralyzed spider. When the larva hatches, it feeds on the spider's organs, keeping the spider alive for as long as possible while doing so.

=== Larva ===
About three days after the egg is laid, the free end of the egg becomes glassy white. The grub chews its way out with its mandibles. Eventually, the eggshell splits, revealing the glistening, white, footless grub. The grub, still attached to the host tarantula by its tail end, arches over and digs into the tarantula's skin, creating a perforation aided by a dissolving fluid. After the grub is firmly attached by both its tail and head to the tarantula, it begins to suck the juices out of the tarantula's body. As it feeds, the larva grows, rapidly engorging itself on the tarantula and darkening in color. As it grows, it molts several times, casting off its head capsule and exoskeleton. After each molt, it resumes feeding, often through a new perforation. By the fourth instar, the tarantula's abdomen has collapsed slightly. At the fifth and last instar, the larva has developed a pair of stout, three-toothed mandibles to keep up with its feeding habits. The larva becomes muscular and mobile by this stage. It cuts a hole into the tarantula's carapace and thrusts its head and thorax inside the host spider, continuing to feed ravenously. As it feeds, it hollows out the tarantula, up to the bases of the spider's legs. Once the larva begins to feed on the legs, the tarantula dies. This entire process from egg to fifth instar takes around 35 days in total.

=== Cocoon and pupa ===
The grub begins to spin a delicate framework to support its cocoon. The Hemipepsis cocoon is a brown silk structure. It is slightly wider at the end from which the wasp will emerge. The inner wall is varnished, but no inner cocoon is seen. Completion takes several hours, and at the end of it, the grub evacuates its alimentary canal; this meconium, or first stool, becomes a hardened mass at the end of the cocoon. The grub is much smaller than it was at the end of feeding because it has expended so much body content on spinning the cocoon and voiding its alimentary canal. The cocoon turns a greasy amber yellow from the original silky gray. The time of hatching is dependent on the season – a cocoon formed early in the summer may hatch during the same summer, but a late summer or autumn brood may remain in cocoon form until the following spring or summer. Upon reaching the pupal stage, the head capsule splits along the mid-line, and a glassy, whitish pupa forces its way out of the discarded larval skin. The pupa turns creamy yellow, with gray-blue, large compound eyes showing through the thin integument. One can also see the antenna, stubby wing pads, and back spines.

=== Emergence from the cocoon ===
As the enclosed wasp develops, the pupa darkens. A sharp scratching noise can be heard as the young wasp cuts its way out of the tough cocoon with its strong mandibles. The hatched cocoon contains the remains of the larval skin, pupal skin, and waste from the larval stage and the young wasp. The young wasp then digs its way out of the underground cell.

== Behavior ==
=== Breeding ===
The breeding season of H. ustulata occurs over a two-and-a-half-month period. Individual males actively seek mates on mountain ridges for up to three weeks at a time. Many males live more than one month.

=== Communication ===
The methods of communication between members of H. ustulata is unknown, especially within the aggregates they form. However, the wasps' powerful residual odors, flight patterns, and flashy colors are all likely candidates for how they communicate with each other.

=== Lekking behavior ===
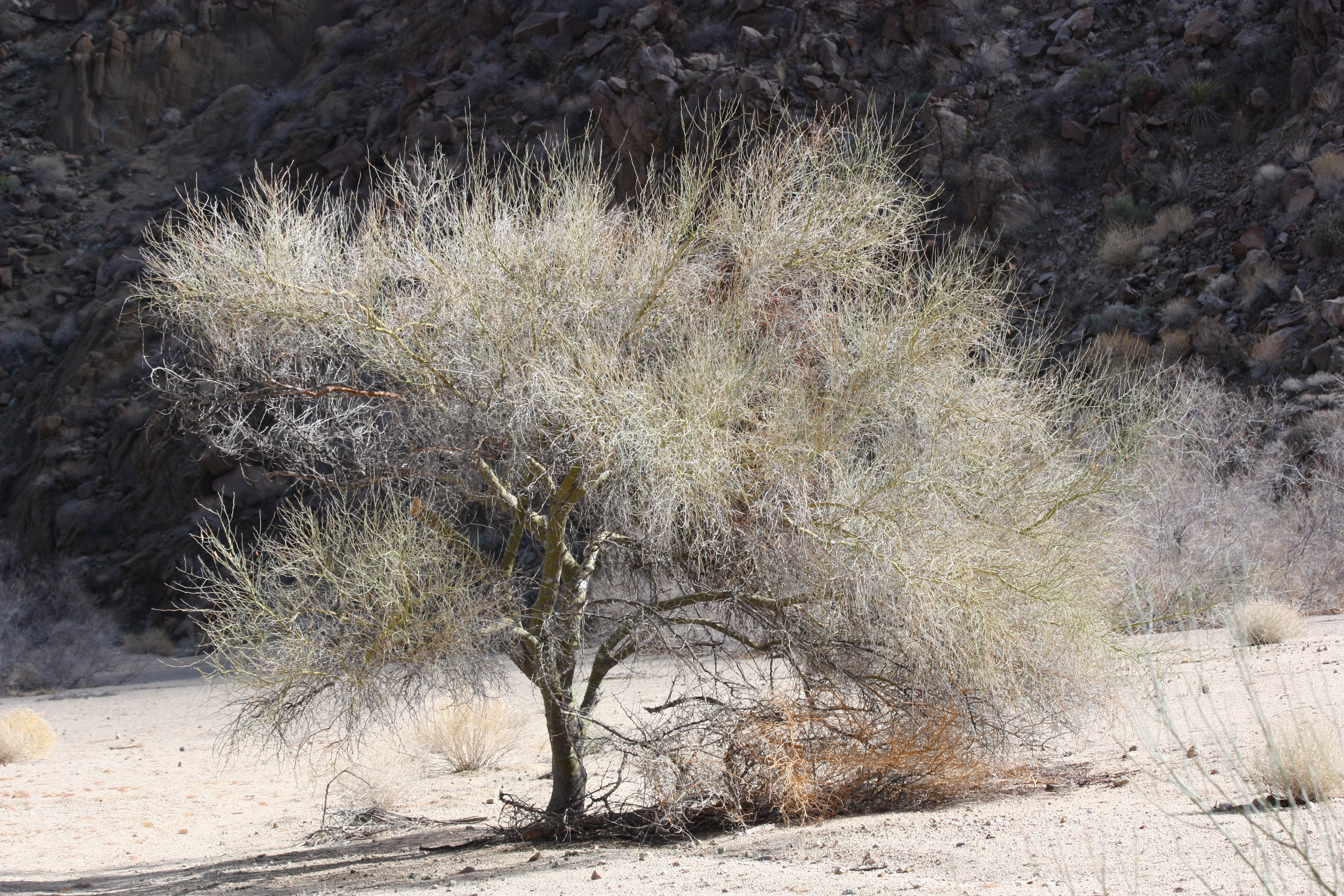
A palo verde tree, the territory landmark of choice of H. ustulata

Males often pick palo verde trees as landmark territories. The most preferred territories tend to be located higher up the mountain ridges. During the male flight season, considerable turnover occurs in territorial ownership. The average duration of male residence is around 8 days. Ownership is contested through aerial combat. Larger males have the advantage, displacing smaller males from the preferred territories over the course of the mating season. Males occur in great abundance during mating season; females are rarely seen. The operational sex ratio during this time is highly skewed towards males. In some ways, H. ustulata's mating system resembles lek polygyny. In hill-topping insects, the male defends territories. Females may visit the territories, but they only remain long enough to mate, not to nest or feed. In a lekking species, the male-defended territory does not contain incentive of resources for females, such as food, shelter, or attractive nesting sites. Other characteristics of H. ustulata's lekking behavior include the existence of a mating arena, where males aggregate year after year, with each male protecting its own perch/display territory and receptive females mate selectively and upon the inspection of the territorial males.

=== Consistency in territorial landmark sites ===
The tarantula hawk wasp returns to the same prominent plants, namely palo verde trees (Cercidium microphyllum), year after year during mating season. The preference rankings of perennial territories in one mountain ridge area remain highly consistent from generation to generation. Indirect evidence shows that the stability of male preferences from year to year indicates that the access to females is related to the ability of acquiring high-ranking territories.

=== Size variation and its behavioral and evolutionary consequences ===
Oftentimes, in the natural history of a species, large body size confers reproductive advantage. This raises the question in H. ustulata: Why do smaller wasps persist? Generation after generation, wide size variation exists among these tarantula hawks. Wasps do not grow after metamorphosis, so smaller animals are at a permanent disadvantage competing against their larger fellows. John Alcock's studies emphasize the importance of size variation in claiming desirable territories among male H. ustulata wasps. Female provisioning behavior may play a role in the maintenance of size variation in this species. In tarantula hawks, the size of the offspring is determined by the mother's decision on how much to invest in each offspring. The size of the tarantula captured by the mother wasp determines how big the larva will become when fully grown. The subduing of a larger tarantula requires a greater energy investment and poses a greater risk to the mother wasp. If the offspring is a large male, it would have to be twice as fit as a smaller male offspring to repay the investment of the mother wasp. Thus, in some cases, it may be advantageous for the mother wasp to produce many small, male offspring. This would enable them to enjoy the same level of fitness as a female, but with fewer, larger progeny.

=== Territorial defense ===
The territorial males of this species perch on prominent vegetation at high elevations (1500 m or higher) and chase away intruders. No more than one individual occupies each territory for more than a few minutes. Every so often, the landowning male wasp makes short, regular flights from its perch. Intruding visitors are common among this species, as males jockey for the best territory. On occasion, the intruder engages in aerial combat with the territory owner over possession of the perch, a tree, or bush. The two males clash wings and spiral vertically upwards, engaging in an aerial contest for the territory.

== Interactions with other species ==
=== Diet ===
H. ustulata larvae feed on tarantulas that are paralyzed and captured by the adult wasps. Adult wasps spend lengthy periods of time patrolling and actively searching for prey on the ground. Adult wasps feed on nectar, and they visit flowers and flowering plants during the day. Popular sources of nectar include milkweeds (Asclepias) and western soapberry trees (Sapindus saponaria).

=== Predators ===
The debilitating, painful sting of H. ustulata deters nearly all predators. No examples of amphibian, reptilian, or mammalian predation of adult tarantula hawks are known. The only documented examples of tarantula hawk predation are of kingbirds in Puerto Rico, discovered by a respected entomologist, Dr. Punzo, who observed two instances of roadrunners attacking grounded tarantula hawks. However, if those tarantula hawks were healthy at the time of attack, or if they were male or female, is not known. Instances of predation by roadrunners in the literature are rare at best, even on harmless males, which speaks to the defensive effectiveness and reputation of tarantula hawks in the animal kingdom.

== Convergent evolution ==
Evidence suggests the convergent evolution in perching and patrolling site preferences of H. ustulata with other hill-topping insects of the Sonoran Desert. The high mountain ridges attract the males of various hill-topping insect species, including tarantula hawk wasps, various butterflies, and botflies. Among these ridges, certain locations are much more likely to be occupied by territorial males. Additionally, these preferred territories appear to be stable from year to year, and different species appear to have similar preferences for available sites. Preferred territories tend to be large, visual targets, jutting high on mountain ridges. These observations were confirmed by a study using artificial landmarks. This similar ranking preference for territories suggests a widespread convergence among the capacity of hill-topping insects' compound eyes in their perception of what constitutes a conspicuous landmark feature.

== Defense ==
=== Body armor ===
The sclerites, leg spines, and integumentary armor of the wasp are adaptations for defense.

=== Venom ===
The venom from the sting of H. ustulata is able to paralyze prey for several months; this paralysis is not directly fatal, but prey is likely to starve to death before the paralysis wears off. The sting of the tarantula hawk (Pepsis spp.) is described on the Schmidt sting pain index as "blinding, fierce, shockingly electric" and "like a running hair dryer has just been dropped in your bubble bath". In humans, the pain of the sting can be lethal depending on the person's condition including weight and body mass. In the best of cases, it is a tearing pain for more than three days.

=== Warning coloration and odor ===
H. ustulata and other tarantula hawk wasps have aposematic coloration. They range from black to blue-black with bright yellow, orange, or red wings. They also emit an aposematic odor, which deters predators.

=== Mimicry ===
Tarantula hawks use convergent coloration for defense. Female tarantula hawks ward off potential predators with their sting, and males, which are stingless, ward off predators as they bear resemblance to the female. Other species, such as Tragidion deceptum, a species of beetle, and Urocerus californicus, the California horntail wasp, ward off predators through both Müllerian and Batesian mimicry of tarantula hawks.

=== Aggregation ===
When resources are scarce, tarantula hawk wasps form congregations for both defense and foraging. Congregations of tarantula hawk wasps are a larger threat to potential predators than individual wasps, making them effective at warding off potential predators. Apart from its defensive value, such congregations are also observed to aid wasps in locating nectar and increasing mating opportunities.
