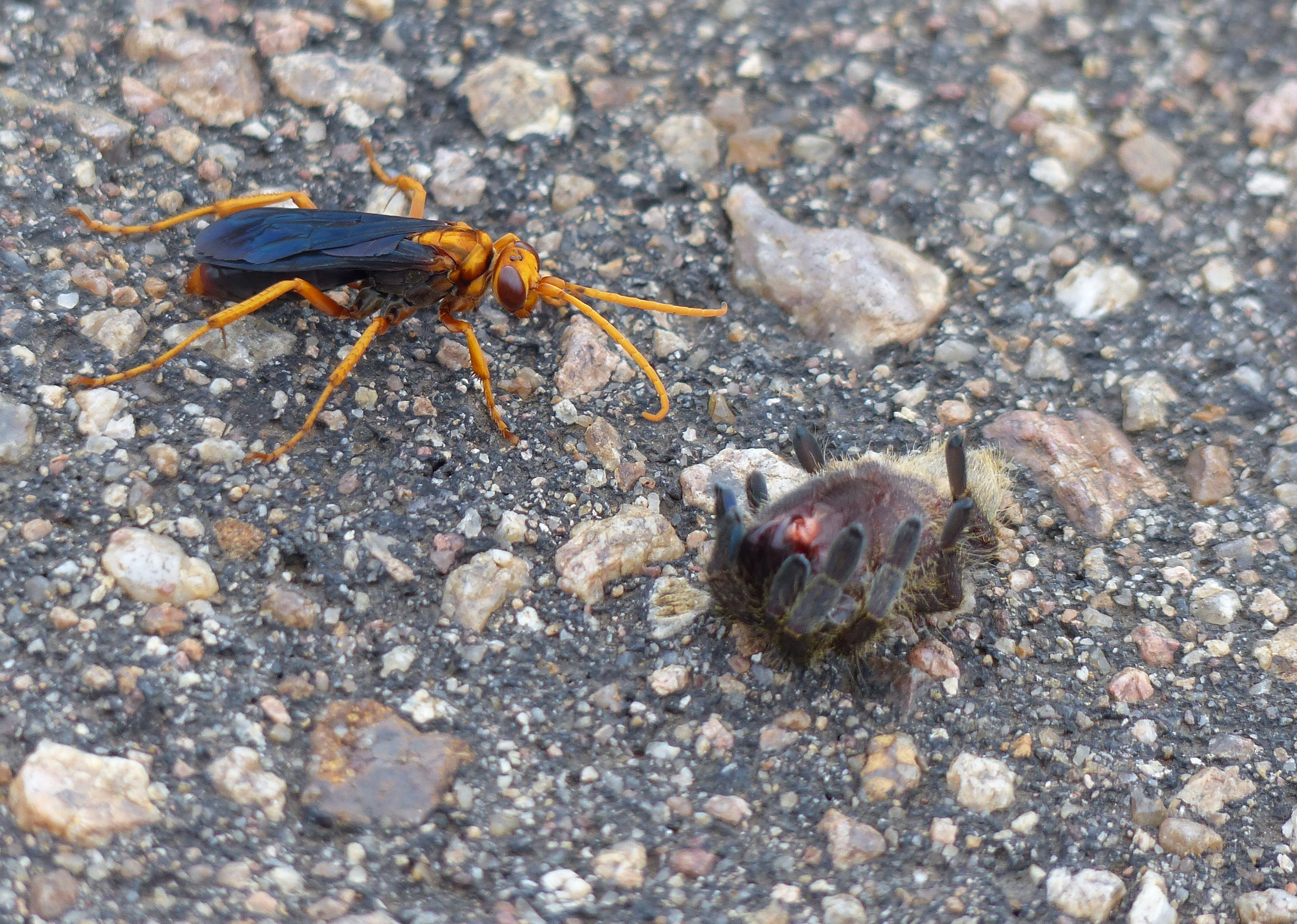
- Hemipepsis tamisieri with its prey, a baboon spider (Theraphosidae).

Scientific classification
- Kingdom: Animalia
- Phylum: Arthropoda
- Clade: Pancrustacea
- Class: Insecta
- Order: Hymenoptera
- Family: Pompilidae
- Genus: Hemipepsis
- Species: H. tamisieri

Binomial name
- Hemipepsis tamisieri (Guérin, 1848)

Synonyms
- Mygnimia distanti Saussure, 1892; Pompilus tamisieri Guérin, 1848; Priocnemis rufopictus Radoszkowski, 1876; Salius rufopictus Radoszkowski; Salius tamisieri (Guerin, 1848)

= Hemipepsis tamisieri =

Species of spider wasp

Hemipepsis tamisieri is a species of afrotropical pepsid spider wasp, one of the so-called tarantula hawks because its preferred prey are tarantulas of the family Theraphosidae.

== Distribution ==
This wasp has been recorded from Uganda, Ethiopia, Angola, Malawi, Zambia, Zimbabwe, South Africa, Nigeria, and Sierra Leone, but is probably widespread in Africa south of the Sahara.

== Biology ==
The adults feed on the nectar of various flowers, many of which are specialised to be pollinated by this species and its cogeners. The females hunt on the ground for spiders of the family Theraphosidae and rain spiders of the genus Palystes which are paralysed with the female's sting to provide a food for the wasp's larva.
