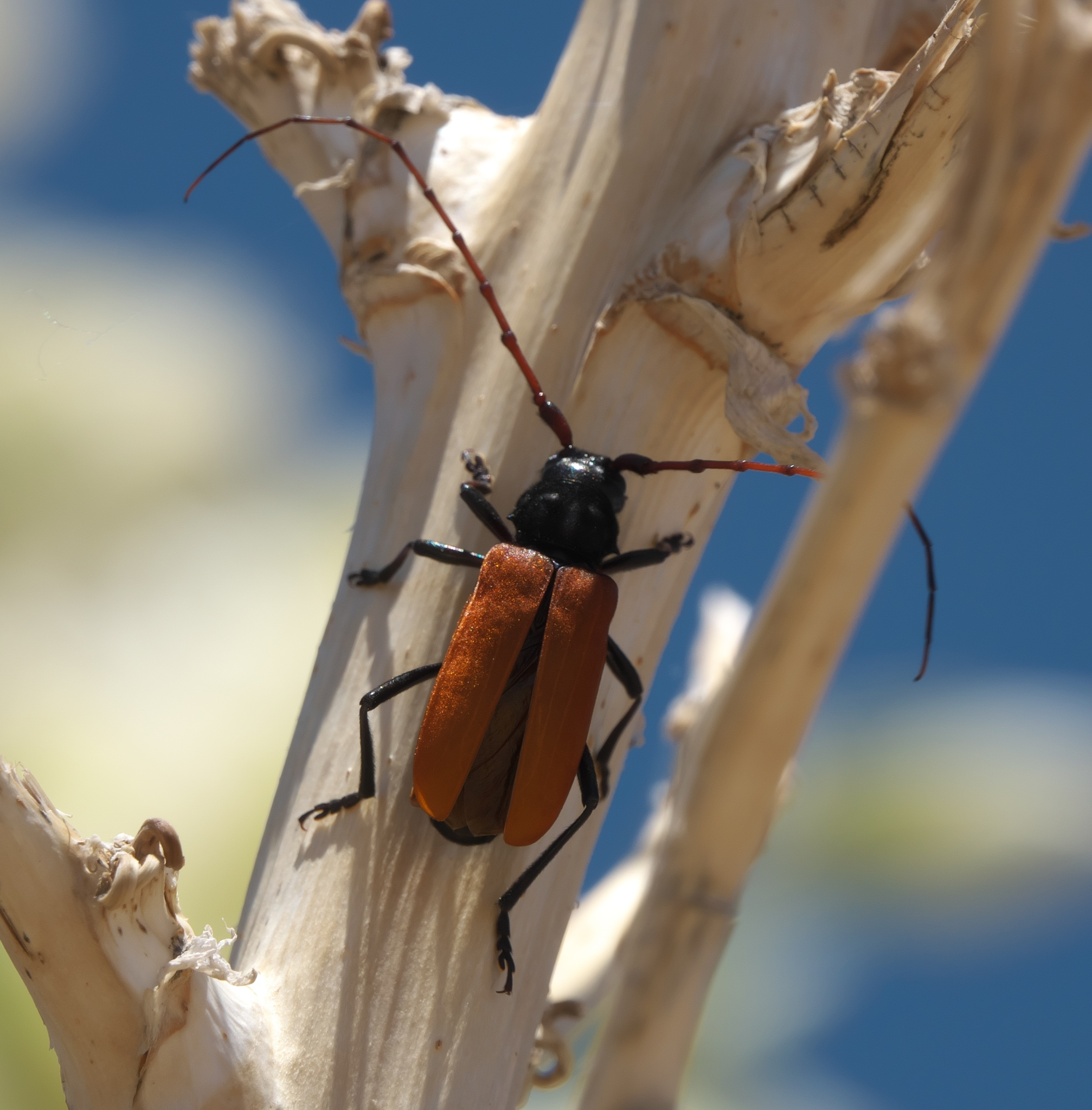
- Tragidion armatum, New Mexico

Scientific classification
- Domain: Eukaryota
- Kingdom: Animalia
- Phylum: Arthropoda
- Class: Insecta
- Order: Coleoptera
- Suborder: Polyphaga
- Infraorder: Cucujiformia
- Family: Cerambycidae
- Genus: Tragidion
- Species: T. armatum

Binomial name
- Tragidion armatum LeConte, 1858

= Tragidion armatum =

Species of beetle

Tragidion armatum is a species of beetle in the family Cerambycidae. It is found in the southwestern United States and Mexico.
