= Tragidion annulatum =

Scientific classification
- Domain: Eukaryota
- Kingdom: Animalia
- Phylum: Arthropoda
- Class: Insecta
- Order: Coleoptera
- Suborder: Polyphaga
- Infraorder: Cucujiformia
- Family: Cerambycidae
- Genus: Tragidion
- Species: T. annulatum

Binomial name
- Tragidion annulatum LeConte, 1858

Species of beetle

Tragidion annulatum is a species of beetle in the family Cerambycidae. It was described by John Lawrence LeConte in 1858.
