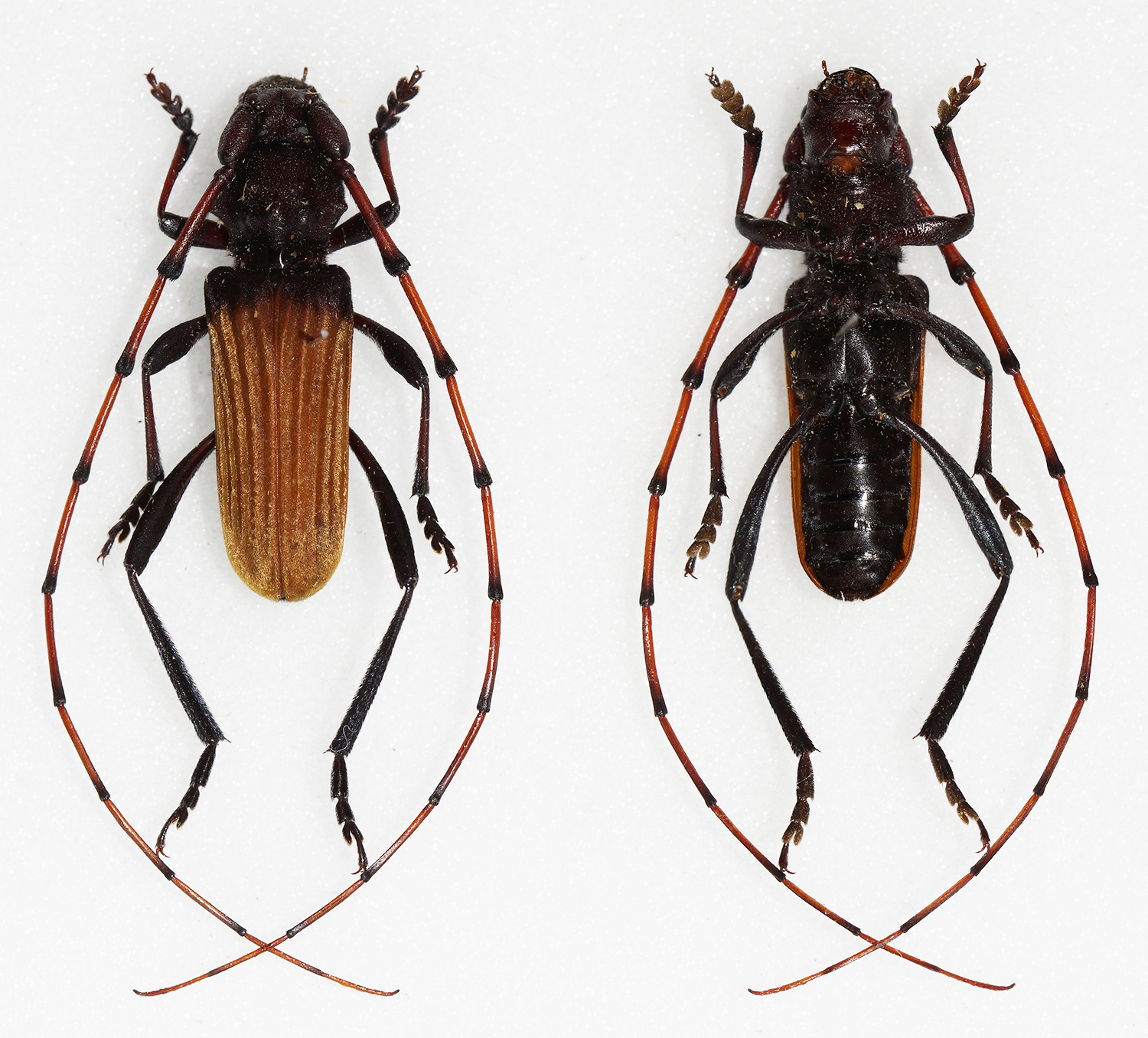
- Tragidion densiventre

Scientific classification
- Domain: Eukaryota
- Kingdom: Animalia
- Phylum: Arthropoda
- Class: Insecta
- Order: Coleoptera
- Suborder: Polyphaga
- Infraorder: Cucujiformia
- Family: Cerambycidae
- Subfamily: Cerambycinae
- Tribe: Trachyderini
- Genus: Tragidion; Audinet-Serville, 1834

= Tragidion =

Genus of beetles

Tragidion is a genus of beetles in the family Cerambycidae, containing the following species:

- Tragidion agave Swift & Ray, 2008
- Tragidion annulatum LeConte, 1858
- Tragidion armatum LeConte, 1858
- Tragidion auripenne Casey, 1893
- Tragidion bicolor Bates, 1885
- Tragidion carinatum Thomson, 1860
- Tragidion coquus (Linnaeus, 1758)
- Tragidion deceptum Swift & Ray, 2008
- Tragidion densiventre Casey, 1912
- Tragidion dichromaticum Linsley, 1957
- Tragidion gracilipes Linsley, 1940
