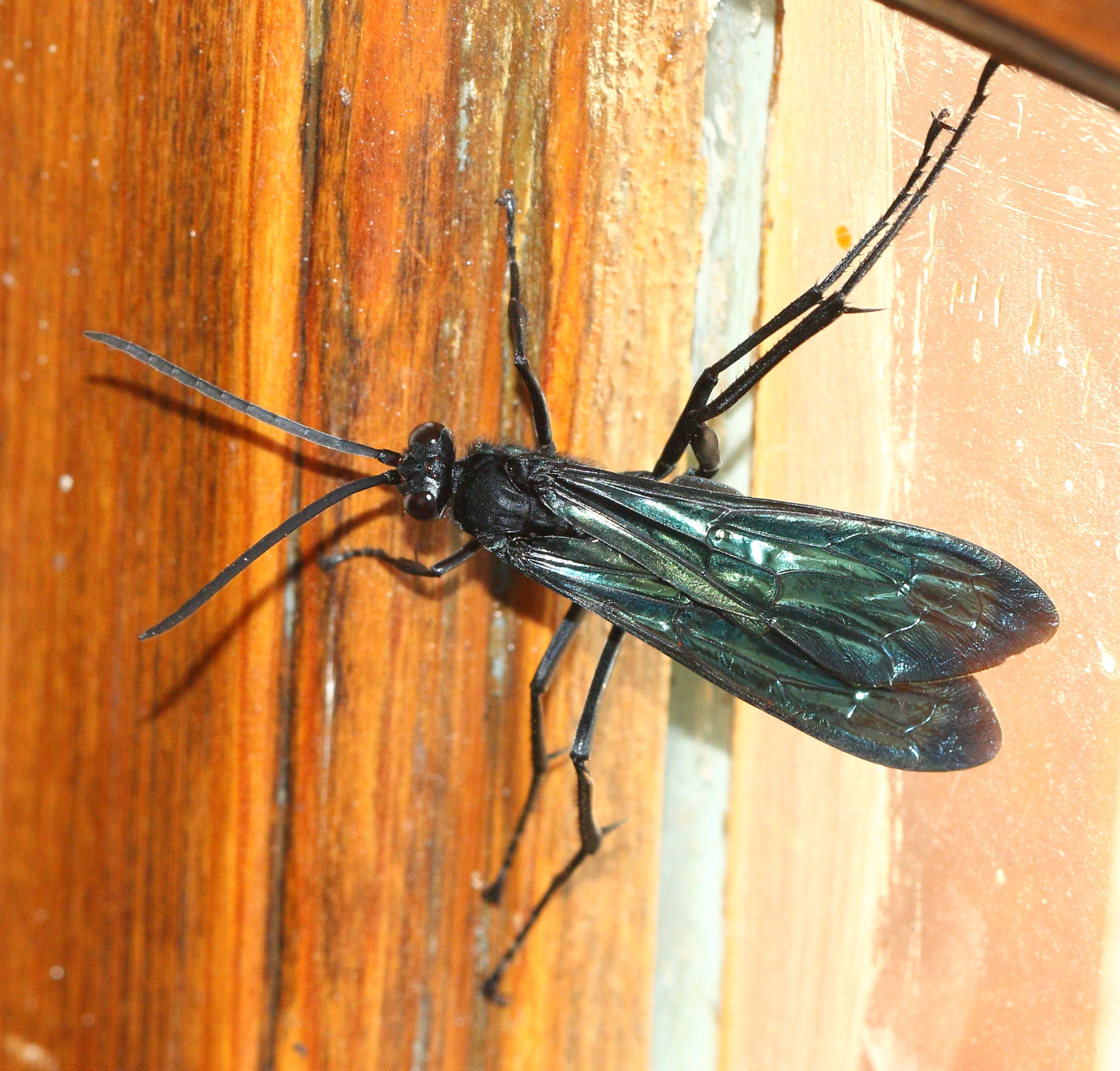
- Male Hemipepsis vindex

Scientific classification
- Kingdom: Animalia
- Phylum: Arthropoda
- Class: Insecta
- Order: Hymenoptera
- Family: Pompilidae
- Genus: Hemipepsis
- Species: H. vindex

Binomial name
- Hemipepsis vindex (Smith, 1855)

Synonyms
- Mygnimia vindex Smith, 1855

= Hemipepsis vindex =

Species of wasp

Hemipepsis vindex is an Afrotropical species of spider wasp specialising in capturing on baboon spiders (Theraphosidae).

== Distribution ==
This spider wasp is widely distributed in Africa, and as far north as Yemen.

== Description ==
Females are large, 34–44 mm long; males are smaller (27–30 mm). They are largely black with fusco-violaceous wings; much of the body has a microscopic pubescence which gives it a greenish blue sheen.
