= Tragidion auripenne =

Scientific classification
- Kingdom: Animalia
- Phylum: Arthropoda
- Class: Insecta
- Order: Coleoptera
- Suborder: Polyphaga
- Infraorder: Cucujiformia
- Family: Cerambycidae
- Genus: Tragidion
- Species: T. auripenne

Binomial name
- Tragidion auripenne Casey, 1893

Species of beetle

Tragidion auripenne is a species of beetle in the family Cerambycidae. It was described by Casey in 1893.
