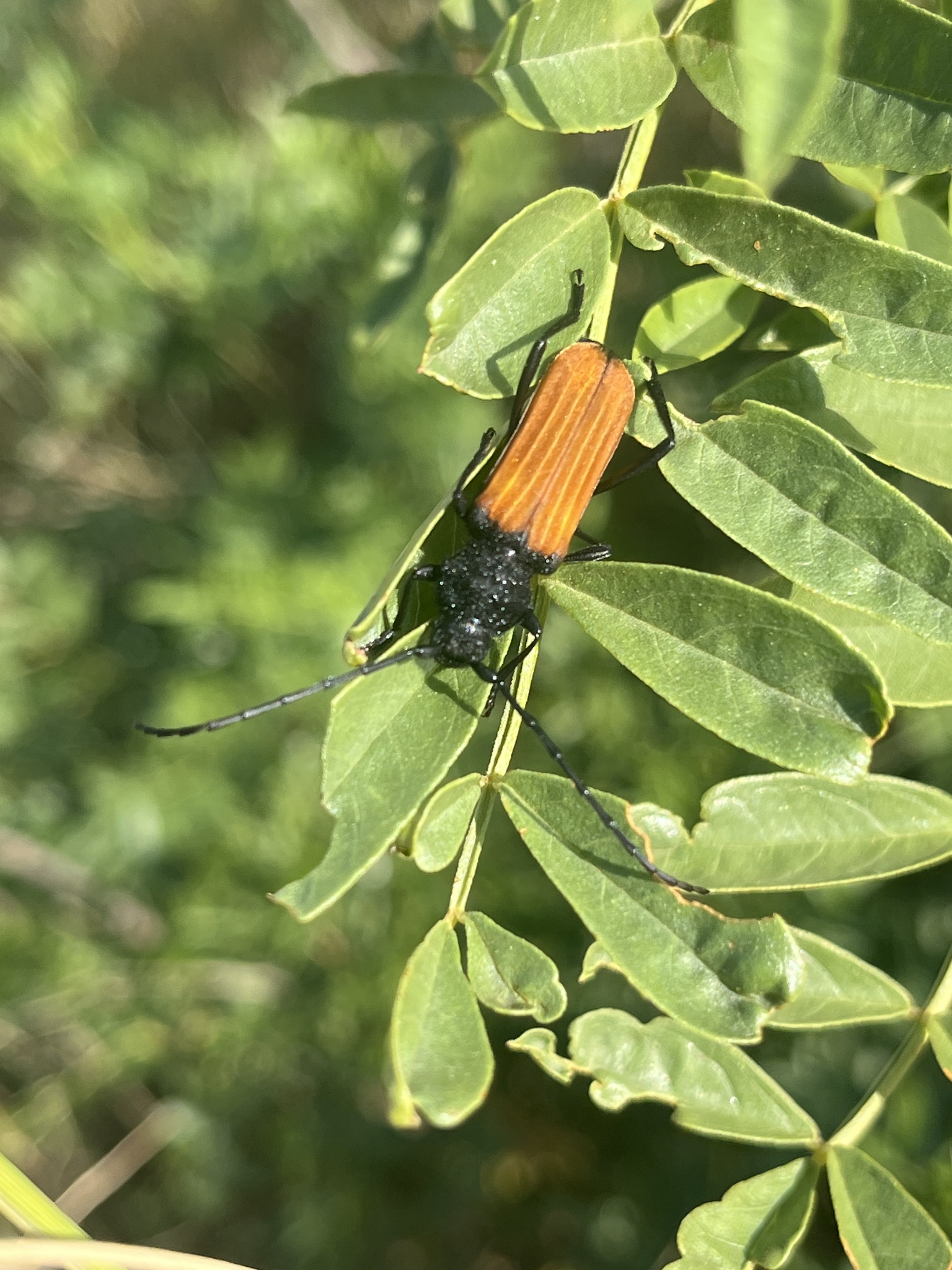
- Tragidion coquus, Colorado

Scientific classification
- Kingdom: Animalia
- Phylum: Arthropoda
- Class: Insecta
- Order: Coleoptera
- Suborder: Polyphaga
- Infraorder: Cucujiformia
- Family: Cerambycidae
- Genus: Tragidion
- Species: T. coquus

Binomial name
- Tragidion coquus (Linnaeus, 1758)

Synonyms
- Cerambyx coquus Linnaeus, 1758; Callidium lynceum Fabricius, 1775; Callidium fulvipenne Say, 1823; Cerambyx (Purpuricenus) Melsheimeri Germar, 1824; Tragidion coquus filicorne Casey, 1912; Tragidion fulvipenne nubifer Casey, 1912; Tragidion fulvipenne levipes Casey, 1912; Tragidion apicatum Casey, 1912

= Tragidion coquus =

Species of beetle

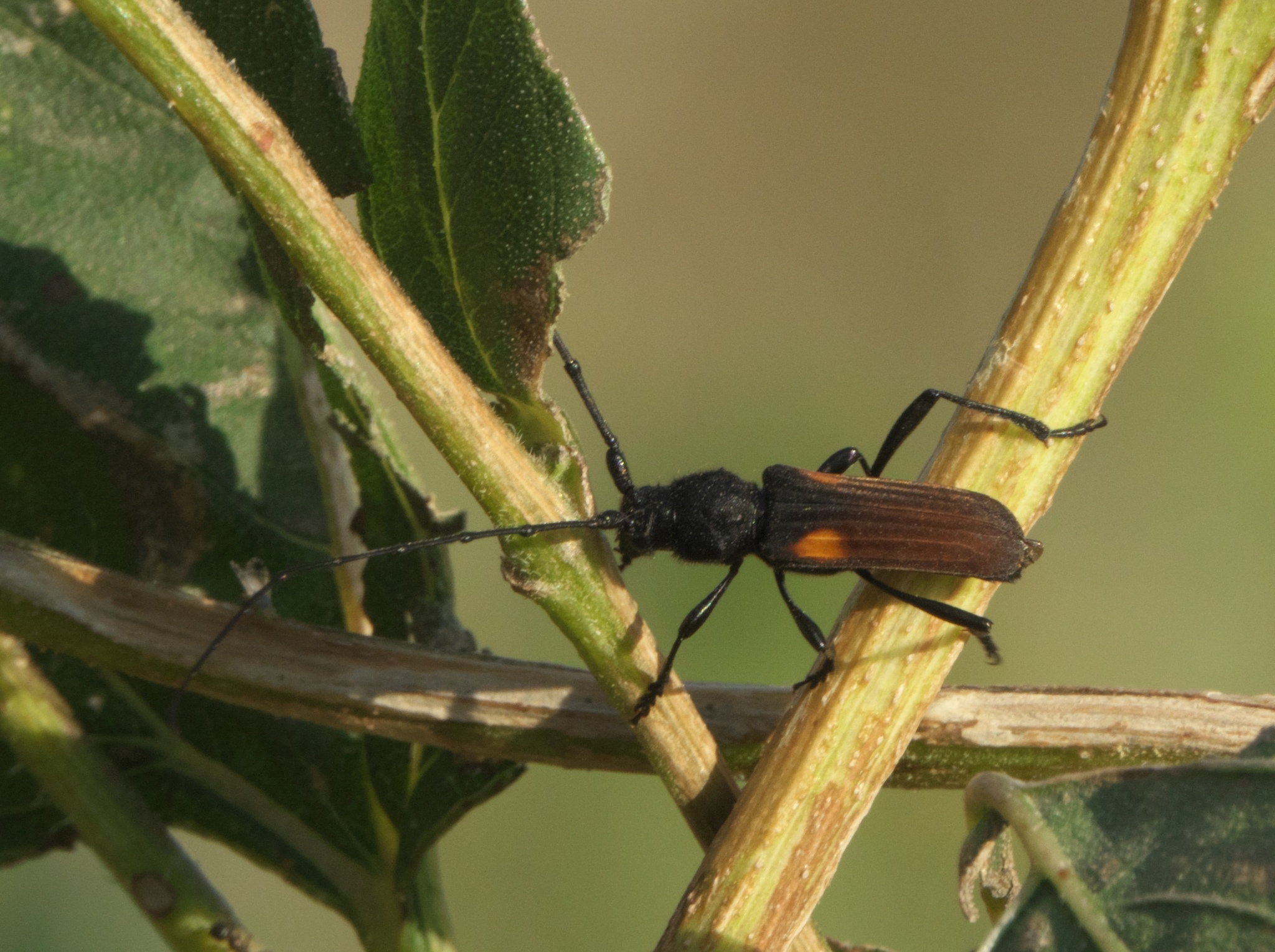
Tragidion coquus, Kansas

Tragidion coquus is a species of longhorn beetle in the family Cerambycidae. It is found in North America.

Individuals of this species have a black head and pronotum, with highly variable amounts of orange on the elytra, ranging from almost completely orange to black.

Tragidion coquus was described by Carl Linnaeus in his landmark 1758 10th edition of Systema Naturae. The specific epithet is sometimes misspelled as "coquum", but it is a noun and must retain the spelling "coquus" under the ICZN.
