= Tragidion carinatum =

Scientific classification
- Domain: Eukaryota
- Kingdom: Animalia
- Phylum: Arthropoda
- Class: Insecta
- Order: Coleoptera
- Suborder: Polyphaga
- Infraorder: Cucujiformia
- Family: Cerambycidae
- Genus: Tragidion
- Species: T. carinatum

Binomial name
- Tragidion carinatum Thomson, 1860

Species of beetle

Tragidion carinatum is a species of beetle in the family Cerambycidae. It was described by Thomson in 1860.
