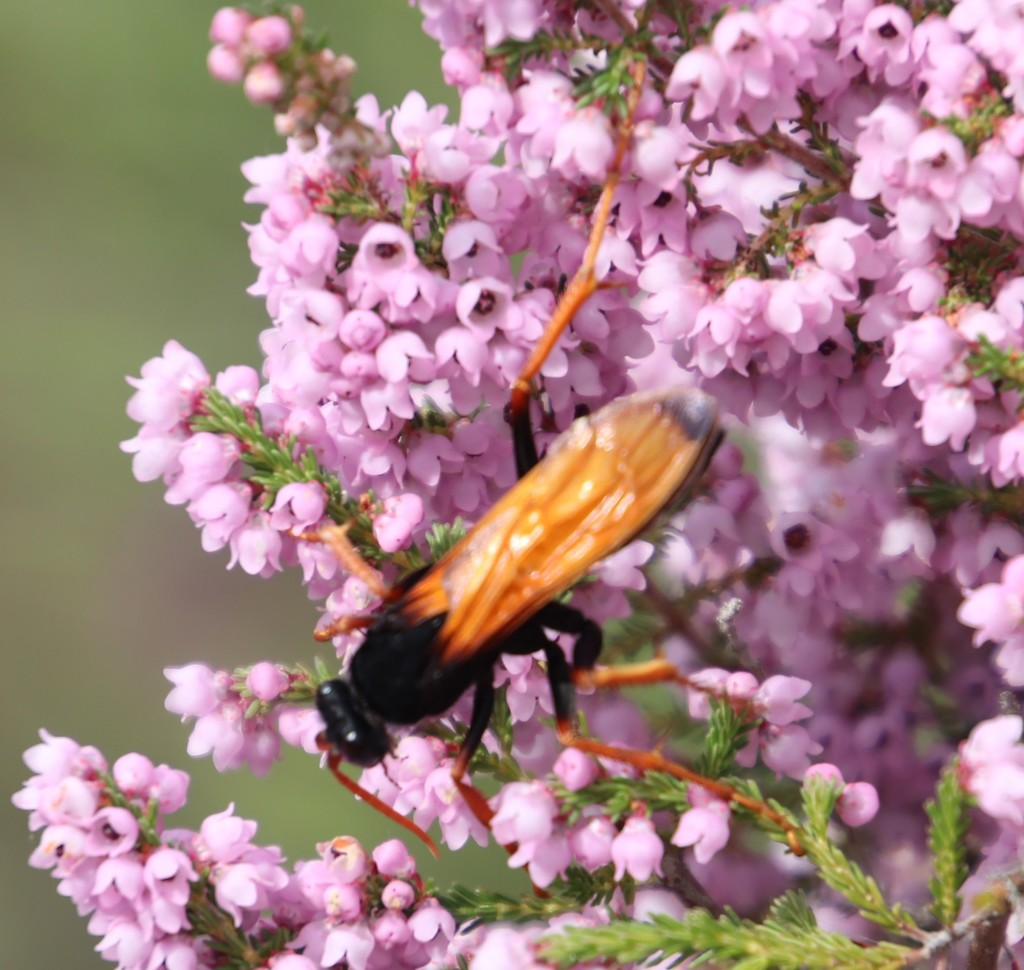
- Hemipepsis capensis

Scientific classification
- Kingdom: Animalia
- Phylum: Arthropoda
- Clade: Pancrustacea
- Class: Insecta
- Order: Hymenoptera
- Family: Pompilidae
- Tribe: Pepsini
- Genus: Hemipepsis; Dahlbom, 1843

Type species
- Hemipepsis capensis (Fabricius, 1781)

= Hemipepsis =

Genus of wasps

Hemipepsis is a genus of large pepsine spider wasps found primarily throughout the tropics. They are commonly known as tarantula hawks. Hemipepsis wasps are morphologically similar to the related genera Pepsis and Entypus, but distinguishable by the pattern of wing venation. In South Africa 18 plant species from three plant families, the Apocynaceae, Orchidaceae, and Asparagaceae subfamily Scilloideae are pollinated exclusively by Hemipepsis wasps.

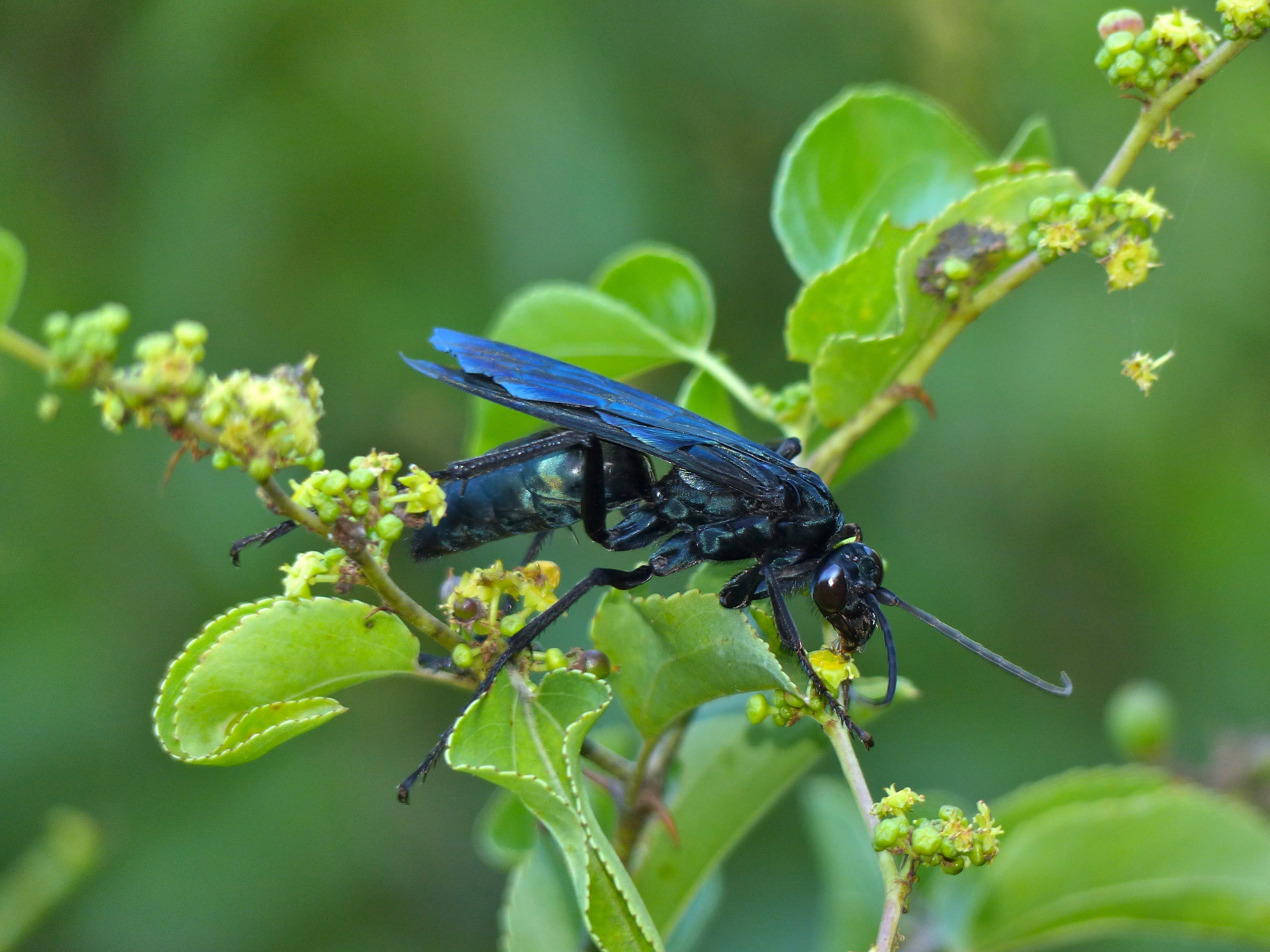
A Hemipepsis sp. wasp, Kruger National Park, South Africa

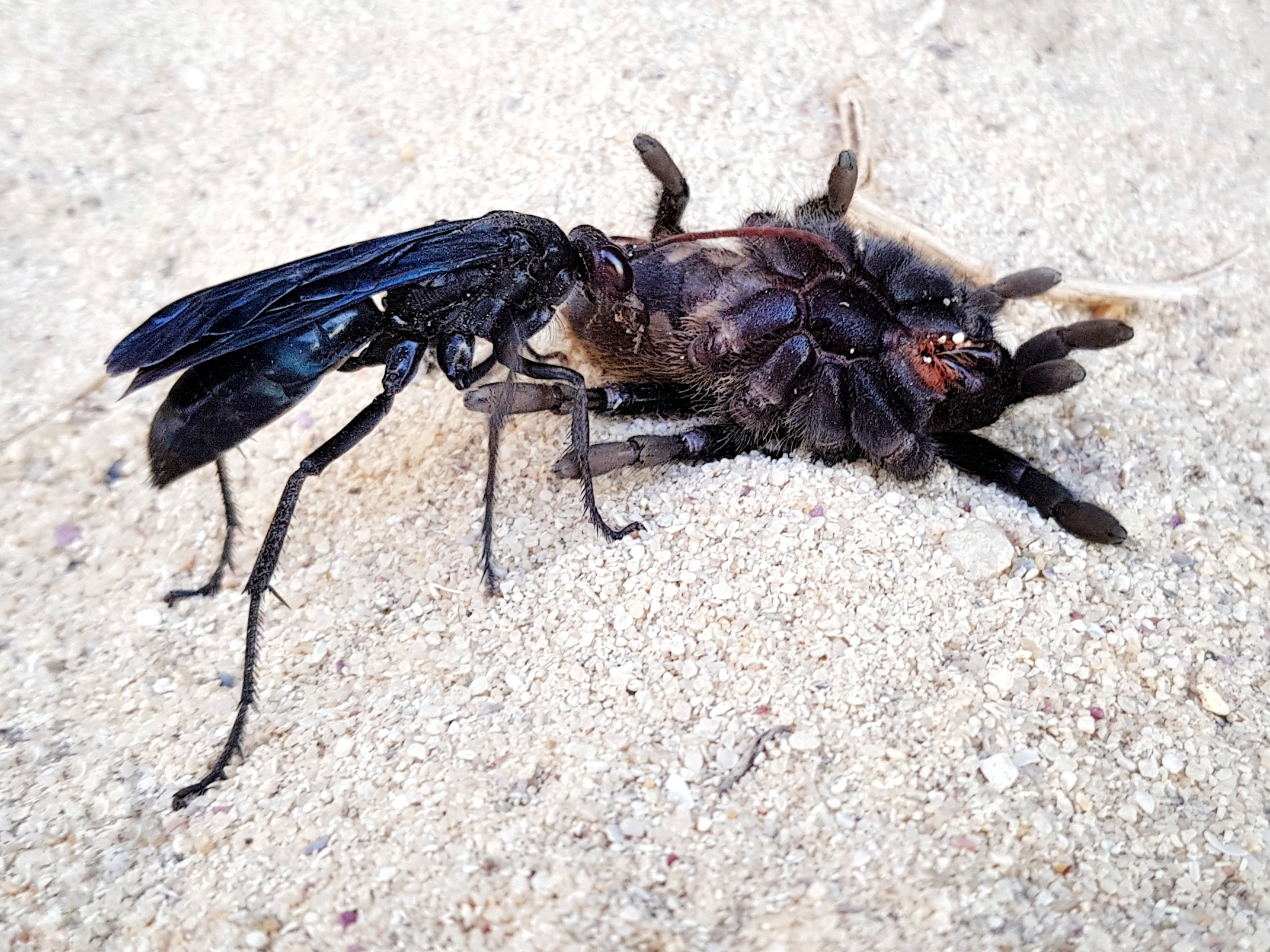
A female Hemipepsis sp. wasp dragging a paralyzed tarantula, Sandy Bay, South Africa

== Species ==
About 180 species are placed in Hemipepsis, including:

- Hemipepsis acer (Bingham, 1897) India
- Hemipepsis aenea (Cameron, 1904) Sikkim
- Hemipepsis aeruginosa (Smith, 1855) Sumatra, Assam
- Hemipepsis aethiops (Kohl, 1913) Democratic Republic of Congo, Zimbabwe Zambia, Ethiopia
- Hemipepsis amamiensis (Tsuneki, 1990) Japan
- Hemipepsis analis (Haupt, 1933) New Guinea
- Hemipepsis anthracina (Smith, 1855) Indonesia
- Hemipepsis approximata (Haupt, 1941) Borneo
- Hemipepsis ascensoi (Zavattari, 1907) Zimbabwe, Uganda
- Hemipepsis atrox (Drury, 1782)
- Hemipepsis audax (Smith, 1855) south-east Asia (Sikkim, Tenasserim
- Hemipepsis aureomicans (Haupt, 1953) Indonesia
- Hemipepsis aurosericea (Guérin-Méneville, 1838) Java
- Hemipepsis australasiae (Smith, 1873) Indonesia, Australia, giant spider wasp
- Hemipepsis bakeri (Banks, 1934) Philippines
- Hemipepsis bellicosus (Smith, 1873) India, Myanmar
- Hemipepsis braunsi (Arnold, 1932) Zimbabwe, South Africa
- Hemipepsis brunnea (Klug, 1834) Middle East, Turkmenistan
- Hemipepsis brunniceps (Taschenberg, 1869) Mozambique, Zimbabwe, South Africa
- Hemipepsis buchardi (Wahis, 2000) Sudan, Somalia, Djibouti, Saudi Arabia, Yemen
- Hemipepsis caelebs (Arnold, 1932) Malawi, Zimbabwe, South Africa
- Hemipepsis capensis (Fabricius, 1781) Uganda, Ethiopia, Zimbabwe, South Africa
- Hemipepsis ceylonicus (Saussure, 1867) India, Sri Lanka, Singapore
- Hemipepsis combusta (Smith, 1855) Zimbabwe
- Hemipepsis commixta (Arnold, 1932) Uganda
- Hemipepsis consanguineous (Saussure, 1867) Sri Lanka
- Hemipepsis convexa (Bingham, 1890) Sri Lanka, Myanmar
- Hemipepsis corallipes (Wahis, 2000) Yemen
- Hemipepsis crassinervis (van der Vecht & Wilcke, 1953) Java, Sumatra
- Hemipepsis curvinervis (Cameron, 1902) Taiwan, Assam
- Hemipepsis dahlbomi (Stål, 1857)
- Hemipepsis deceptor (Smith, 1859) Sulawesi
- Hemipepsis dedjas (Guérin, 1848) Senegal, Uganda, Ethiopia, Zimbabwe, South Africa
- Hemipepsis dubitans Banks, 1934 Philippines
- Hemipepsis elizabethae (Bingham, 1893) India, Myanmar, Java
- Hemipepsis erythropyga (Arnold, 1932) Nigeria
- Hemipepsis exasperate (Smith, 1863) Indonesia
- Hemipepsis excepta (Banks, 1934) Philippines
- Hemipepsis eximia (Wahis, 1960) India
- Hemipepsis fallax (Saussure, 1892) Ethiopia, Zimbabwe, South Africa
- Hemipepsis fenestratus (Smith, 1855) Sikkim
- Hemipepsis ferox (Arnold, 1948) Zimbabwe
- Hemipepsis ferruginea (Smith, 1861) New Guinea
- Hemipepsis fervida (Smith, 1861) China, Taiwan, Zimbabwe, South Africa
- Hemipepsis fischeri (Wahis, 1968) Indonesia
- Hemipepsis flavopicta (Smith, 1891) India
- Hemipepsis fulvipennis (Fabricius, 1793) India, Sri Lanka
- Hemipepsis fumipennis (Smith, 1859) Sulawesi
- Hemipepsis gigas (Taschenberg, 1869) Java, Borneo
- Hemipepsis glabrata (Klug, 1834) Zimbabwe, Ethiopia, South Africa
- Hemipepsis hanedai (Tsuneki, 1990) Japan
- Hemipepsis heros (Guérin-Méneville, 1849) Ethiopia, Senegal
- Hemipepsis heteroneura (Turner, 1918) Uganda
- Hemipepsis hilaris (Smith, 1879) Lesotho, Zimbabwe, South Africa
- Hemipepsis hottentota (Taschenberg, 1869) Yemen
- Hemipepsis ichneumonea (Guérin-Méneville, 1831) New Guinea, Australia
- Hemipepsis indica (Linnaeus, 1758) India, Myanmar, Indonesia, New Guinea
- Hemipepsis insignis (Smith, 1855) West Africa
- Hemipepsis intermedia (Smith, 1873) Sri Lanka, India
- Hemipepsis iodoptera (Stål, 1857) Uganda, South Africa, Ghana
- Hemipepsis jacobsoni (van der Vecht & Wilcke, 1953) Java
- Hemipepsis kangeanensis (van der Vecht & Wilcke, 1953) Java
- Hemipepsis kiogae (Arnold, 1932) Yemen
- Hemipepsis lacaena (Smith, 1861) Ambon Island
- Hemipepsis laeta (Smith, 1873) Myanmar
- Hemipepsis latirostris (Arnold, 1932) Uganda, Zimbabwe
- Hemipepsis lucernaris (Wahis, 2000) Yemen
- Hemipepsis luctuosa (Arnold, 1948) Zimbabwe
- Hemipepsis lusca(Fabricius, 1804) India
- Hemipepsis luzonica (Banks, 1934) Philippines
- Hemipepsis martini (Bingham, 1896) Sumatra
- Hemipepsis mashonae (Arnold, 1932) Kenya, Zimbabwe
- Hemipepsis matangensis (Cameron, 1905) Borneo
- Hemipepsis mauritanica (Linnaeus, 1767) Morocco, Algeria, Tunisia, Libya, Italy, Spain, Turkey
- Hemipepsis mexicana (Cresson, 1867) Mexico, Colombia
- Hemipepsis minora (Banks, 1934) Philippines
- Hemipepsis misera (Cameron, 1901) Singapore
- Hemipepsis mlanjiensis (Turner, 1918) Ethiopia, Malawi, Mozambique
- Hemipepsis momentosa (Smith, 1873) Borneo
- Hemipepsis negritos (Banks, 1934) Philippines
- Hemipepsis nigricornis (van der Vecht & Wilcke, 1953) Java
- Hemipepsis obscurus (Lucas, 1898) Tanzania
- Hemipepsis obsolete (Saussure, 1867) Sri Lanka
- Hemipepsis obsonator (Bingham, 1897) India
- Hemipepsis ocellata (Fabricius, 1782) Cameroon
- Hemipepsis ochropus (Stål, 1857) Nigeria, Ghana, Cameroon
- Hemipepsis odin (Strand, 1914) Malaya
- Hemipepsis opulenta (Smith, 1863) Misool
- Hemipepsis perhirsuta (Banks, 1940) Madagascar
- Hemipepsis perplexa (Smith, 1855) India, Myanmar, Taiwan
- Hemipepsis petri (Schulz, 1906) Assam
- Hemipepsis pilosipes (Arnold, 1948) Zimbabwe
- Hemipepsis placida (Bingham, 1896) Tenasserim
- Hemipepsis procera (Wahis, 1968) Indonesia, Myanmar, Malaysia
- Hemipepsis quadridentata (van der Vecht & Wilcke, 1953) Java
- Hemipepsis refulgens (Turner, 1918) Uganda
- Hemipepsis robertiana (Cameron, 1903) Borneo
- Hemipepsis rubida (Bingham, 1890) Sri Lanka
- Hemipepsis rufofemoratus (Lucas, 1898) Zanzibar
- Hemipepsis sabulosa (Smith, 1855) Egypt, Iran, Yemen. Benin, Eritrea
- Hemipepsis sericeipennis (Bingham, 1902) Zimbabwe, South Africa
- Hemipepsis severa (Drury, 1782)
- Hemipepsis simpsoni (Arnold, 1932) Ghana
- Hemipepsis sinuosa (Kohl, 1913) Nigeria
- Hemipepsis sogdiana (Zonstein, 2000) China, Taiwan, Japan, India, Kyrgyzstan
- Hemipepsis speculifer (Lepeletier) Java, Malaya
- Hemipepsis sublivida (Arnold, 1948) Zimbabwe
- Hemipepsis sulfureicornis (Arnold, 1960) Democratic Republic of Congo
- Hemipepsis sycophanta (Gribodo, 1884) Sri Lanka, India, Myanmar, Malaya
- Hemipepsis tagala (Gribodo, 1884) Philippines
- Hemipepsis taiwanensis (Tsuneki, 1989) Taiwan
- Hemipepsis tamisieri (Guérin, 1848) Uganda, Ethiopia, Angola, Malawi, Zambia, Zimbabwe, South Africa, Nigeria, Sierra Leone
- Hemipepsis taprobanae (Cameron, 1901) Sri Lanka
- Hemipepsis thione (Smith, 1861) Ambon Island
- Hemipepsis toussainti (Banks, 1928) Hispaniola
- Hemipepsis turneri (Arnold, 1936) South Africa
- Hemipepsis unguicularis (Kohl, 1913) Democratic Republic of Congo
- Hemipepsis unifasciata (Radoszkowski, 1881) Angola, Ethiopia
- Hemipepsis ustulata Dahlbom, 1843 United States of America
- Hemipepsis vanuana Banks 1941 Solomon Islands
- Hemipepsis variabilis ((Arnold, 1932) Uganda
- Hemipepsis vechti (Wahis, 1959)
- Hemipepsis veda (Cameron, 1891) India
- Hemipepsis velutina (van der Vecht & Wilcke, 1953) Indonesia
- Hemipepsis venatoria (Bingham, 1896) Myanmar
- Hemipepsis vespertilio (Gerstaecker, 1857) Uganda, Zimbabwe, South Africa
- Hemipepsis vestitipennis (Turner, 1918) Uganda, Somalia, Yemen
- Hemipepsis vindex (Smith, 1855) Sub-Saharan Africa and Yemen
- Hemipepsis viridipennis (Lucas, 1898) Tanzania
- Hemipepsis vulcanica (van der Vecht & Wilcke, 1953) Java
- Hemipepsis yayeyamana (Tsuneki, 1990) Japan
- Hemipepsis yemenita (Wahis, 2000) Somalia, Yemen
