= Tragidion agave =

Scientific classification
- Domain: Eukaryota
- Kingdom: Animalia
- Phylum: Arthropoda
- Class: Insecta
- Order: Coleoptera
- Suborder: Polyphaga
- Infraorder: Cucujiformia
- Family: Cerambycidae
- Genus: Tragidion
- Species: T. agave

Binomial name
- Tragidion agave Swift & Ray, 2008

Species of beetle

Tragidion agave is a species of beetle in the family Cerambycidae. It was described by Swift & Ray in 2008.
