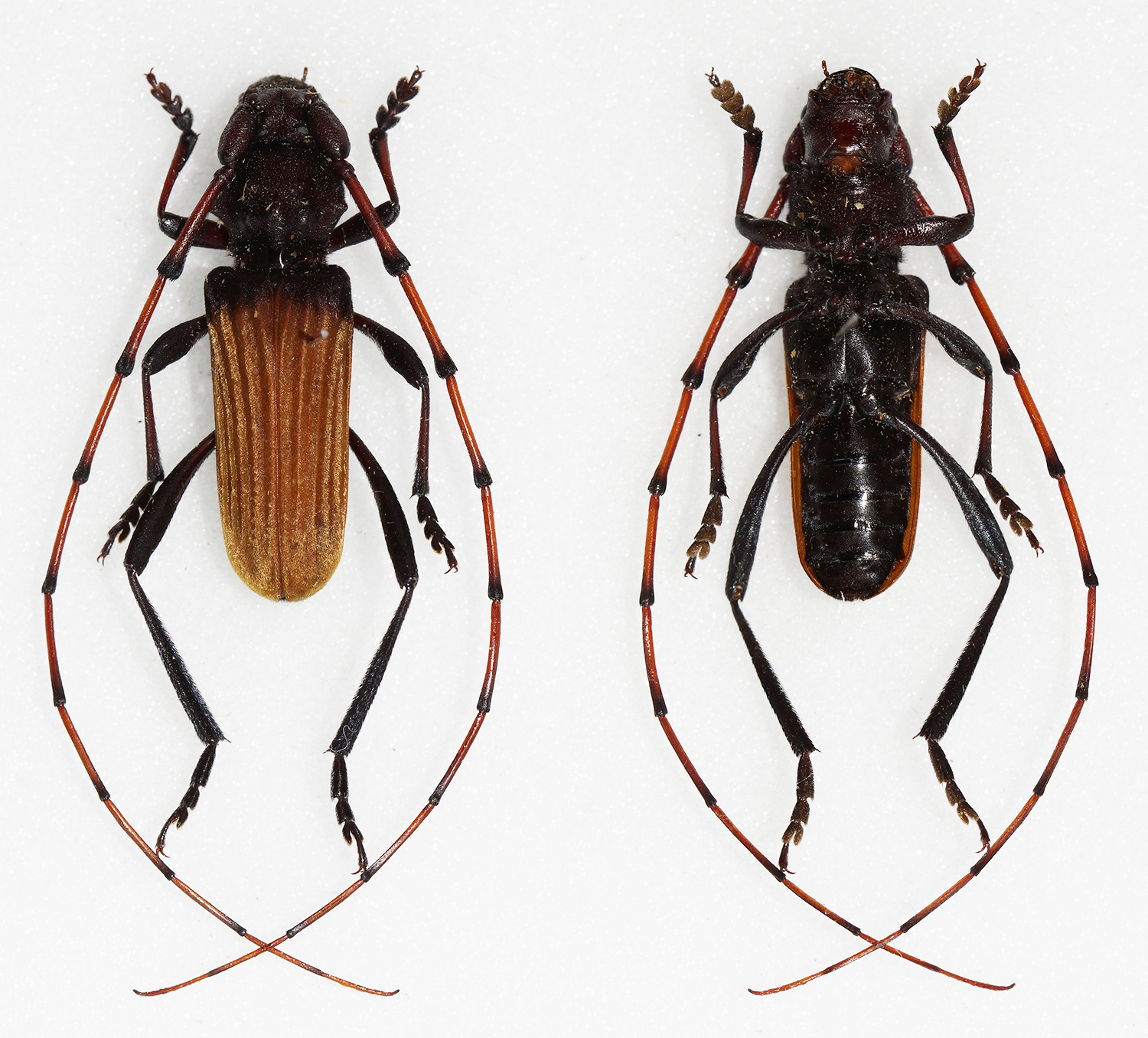

Scientific classification
- Kingdom: Animalia
- Phylum: Arthropoda
- Class: Insecta
- Order: Coleoptera
- Suborder: Polyphaga
- Infraorder: Cucujiformia
- Family: Cerambycidae
- Genus: Tragidion
- Species: T. densiventre

Binomial name
- Tragidion densiventre Casey, 1912

= Tragidion densiventre =

Species of beetle

Tragidion densiventre is a species of beetle in the family Cerambycidae. It was described by Casey in 1912.
