= Tragidion dichromaticum =

Scientific classification
- Domain: Eukaryota
- Kingdom: Animalia
- Phylum: Arthropoda
- Class: Insecta
- Order: Coleoptera
- Suborder: Polyphaga
- Infraorder: Cucujiformia
- Family: Cerambycidae
- Genus: Tragidion
- Species: T. dichromaticum

Binomial name
- Tragidion dichromaticum Linsley, 1957

Species of beetle

Tragidion dichromaticum is a species of beetle in the family Cerambycidae. It was described by Linsley in 1957.
