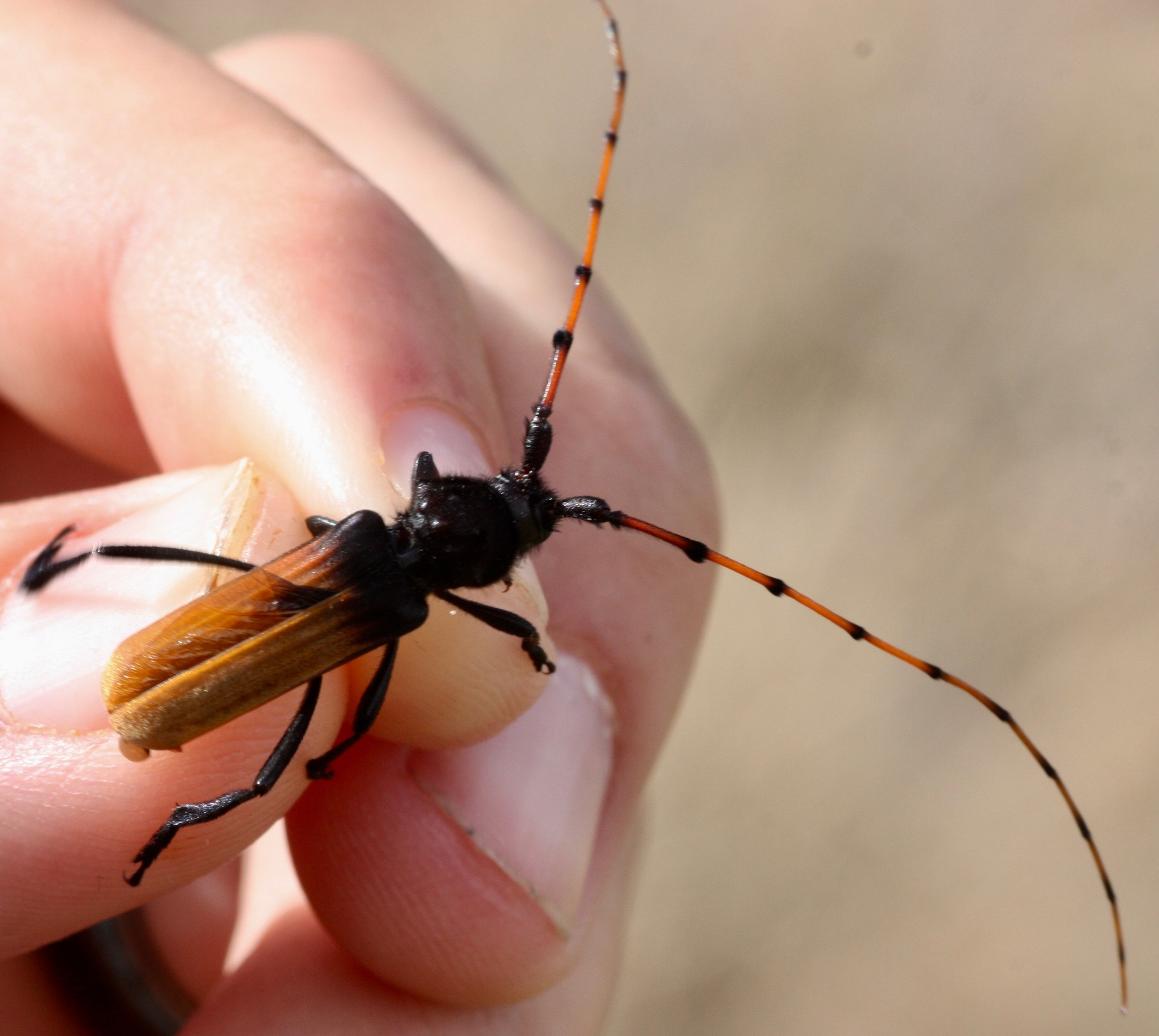

Scientific classification
- Domain: Eukaryota
- Kingdom: Animalia
- Phylum: Arthropoda
- Class: Insecta
- Order: Coleoptera
- Suborder: Polyphaga
- Infraorder: Cucujiformia
- Family: Cerambycidae
- Genus: Tragidion
- Species: T. deceptum

Binomial name
- Tragidion deceptum Swift & Ray, 2008

= Tragidion deceptum =

Species of beetle

Tragidion deceptum is a species of beetle in the family Cerambycidae. It was described by Swift & Ray in 2008. The adult is black with orange-yellow on the whole of the elytra except for the parts nearest the thorax. The insect is native to the south-western United States (Arizona, New Mexico, and Texas) and Mexico.
